= List of chancellors of the University of Kansas =

The following persons have led the University of Kansas:

No.	Image	Name	Term start	Term end	Ref.
1		R. W. Oliver	1865	December 1867 (Note: Resigned to head a pastorate in Kearney, Nebraska.)	
2		John Fraser	1867	1874 (Note: Resigned to become the state superintendent of public instruction.)	
3		James Marvin	January 4, 1875	September 10, 1883	
4		Joshua Lippincott	September 11, 1883	June 5, 1889 (Note: Resigned to become a pastor for the First United Methodist Church in Topeka.)	
interim		William C. Spangler	June 5, 1889	June 30, 1890	
5		Francis H. Snow	July 1, 1890	November 10, 1900 (Note: Took a leave of absence for health reason in November 1900, but did not formally submitted his resignation until May 1901.)	
interim		William C. Spangler	November 10, 1900	July 31, 1902	
6		Frank Strong	August 1, 1902	June 30, 1920	
7		Ernest Lindley	July 1, 1920	June 30, 1939	
8		Deane Waldo Malott (Note: First alumnus (B.A. 1921) to serve as chancellor.)	July 1, 1939	June 30, 1951 (Note: Resigned to head Cornell University.)	
acting		John Nelson	July 1, 1951	August 31, 1951	
9		Franklin David Murphy	September 1, 1951	June 30, 1960 (Note: Resigned to head the University of California at Los Angeles (UCLA).)	
10		William Clarke Wescoe	July 1, 1960	June 30, 1969	
acting		James R. Surface	July 1, 1969	August 31, 1969	
11		E. Laurence Chalmers	September 1, 1969	August 19, 1972 (Note: Resigned to head an art school.)	
interim		Raymond Nichols	August 19, 1972	October 20, 1972	
12		Raymond Nichols	October 20, 1972	June 30, 1973	
13		Archie Dykes	July 1, 1973	August 14, 1980 (Note: Resigned to head a Topeka-based life insurance company.)	
acting		Del Shankel	August 15, 1980	July 31, 1981	
14		Gene Budig	August 1, 1981	July 31, 1994 (Note: Resigned to head the American League of Professional Baseball Clubs.)	
acting		Del Shankel	August 1, 1994	April 20, 1995	
15		Del Shankel	April 20, 1995	June 30, 1995	
16		Robert Hemenway	July 1, 1995	June 30, 2009	
interim		Barbara F. Atkinson	July 1, 2009	August 14, 2009	
17		Bernadette Gray-Little	August 15, 2009	June 30, 2017	
18		Doug Girod	July 1, 2017	present	

Table notes:
