= History of the University of Kansas =

Coordinates: 38°57′13″N 95°15′36″W

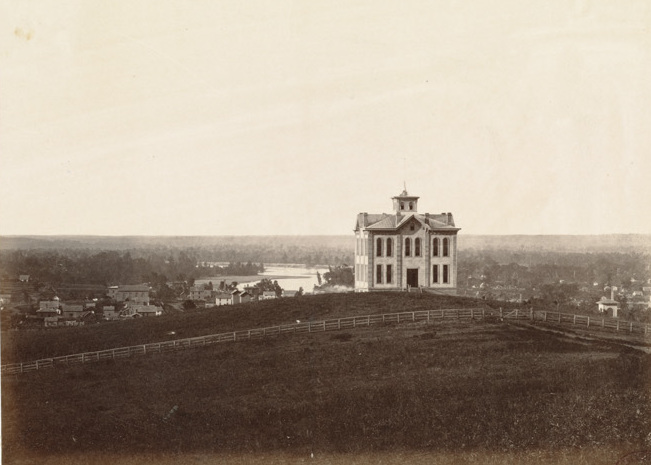
Old North College, the first building on KU Campus, overlooking Lawrence and the Kansas River, ca. 1867

The history of the University of Kansas can be traced back to 1855, when efforts were begun to establish a "University of the Territory of Kansas." Nine years later in 1864, together with the help of Amos Adams Lawrence, former Kansas Governor Charles L. Robinson, and several other prominent figures, the Kansas Legislature chartered the University of Kansas in Lawrence, Kansas. The university was initially funded by a $15,000 endowment on a 40-acre (160,000 m^{2}) allotment of land from Charles Robinson and his wife Sara. The university commenced preparatory-level classes in 1866 and college-level classes in 1869.

The establishment of the university was complicated by several issues, including debates over slavery, the location of the university, and financial issues.

== Beginnings: 1850s–1880s ==
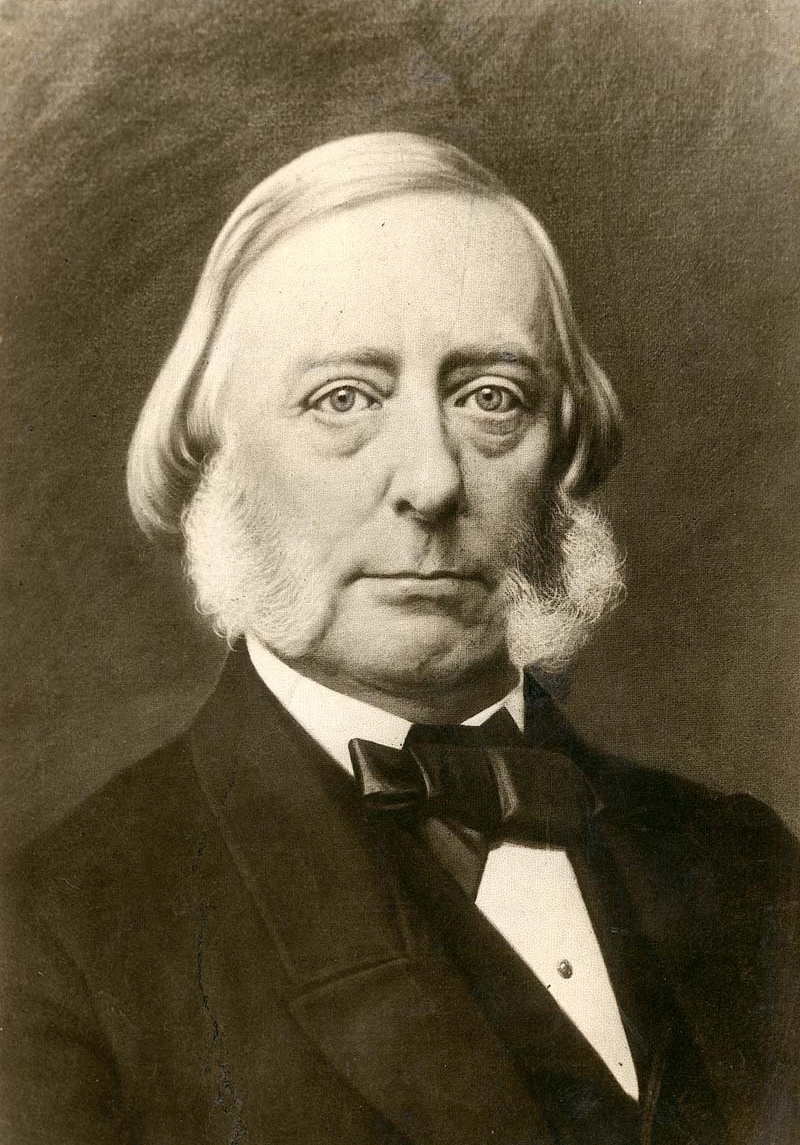
Territorial Gov. Andrew Reeder

=== Conception ===
The idea for a public university in the Kansas Territory was first publicly raised by Territorial Governor Andrew Reeder on July 3, 1855, when he addressed members of the first territorial legislature, saying: "To enlarge upon the necessity of general education for producing good government," he told the lawmakers, "would be at this day a work of supererogation, and I leave the matter in your hands, confident it will receive the attention it deserves." Following his speech, the session responded by establishing a system of common schools for the territory, and also approved a charter for a "University of the Territory of Kansas," proposed to be located in Douglas, Kansas (near present-day Lecompton). However, this proposed university never came to be. Both Free-Staters and their opposition continued to fight fiercely for the right to control the university.

At the same time, a number of settlements across Kansas Territory were also proposing the creation of private colleges – including Lawrence, Kansas, which eventually became home to the University of Kansas.

Lawrence residents had originally proposed opening a private Free-State college in the town when it was first settled, in the summer of 1854. That fall, one of the agents of the New England Emigrant Aid Company, Charles Robinson, told treasurer Amos Adams Lawrence that the citizens of Lawrence would begin a college as soon as possible, to be located atop Hogback Ridge (later known as Mount Oread). By 1856, no private college for Lawrence was yet established, but town residents were still hoping to do so – and now also began to hope that it could later be converted into the state's university. On Christmas Day of 1856, a group of prominent Lawrence citizens adopted a resolution from a business committee stating that the time had come to establish a college in Lawrence. Fifteen trustees were appointed to govern the institution and immediately appointed a committee to petition congress for land. It was estimated that $100,000 would be necessary to get the college started properly, and that nearly all of this money would have to be raised outside of the Kansas Territory. The territorial legislature chartered a private "University of Lawrence" in January 1859, but in the end, the settlers were never able to create a private college in Lawrence.

=== Establishment ===
In 1859, provisions were written for a state university into the Wyandotte Constitution, under which Kansas became a state in 1861. The first Kansas state legislature, meeting in 1861, passed a bill that would establish the state university in Manhattan, Kansas, using the assets of the existing Blue Mont Central College. But the bill was vetoed by Governor Charles Robinson of Lawrence, and an attempt to override the veto in the Legislature failed by two votes. In 1862, another bill to make Manhattan the site of the state university failed by one vote. Finally, on February 16, 1863, the state accepted Manhattan's offer to donate the Blue Mont College building and grounds and established the state's land-grant college at the site – the institution that would become Kansas State University.

However, the legislature distinguished Manhattan's land-grant institution from the "state university," and on February 20, 1863, Kansas Governor Thomas Carney signed into law a bill creating the state university in Lawrence. The law was conditioned upon a gift from Lawrence of a $15,000 endowment fund and a site for the university, in or near the town, of not less than forty acres (160,000 m^{2}) of land. If Lawrence failed to meet these conditions, Emporia instead of Lawrence would get the university.

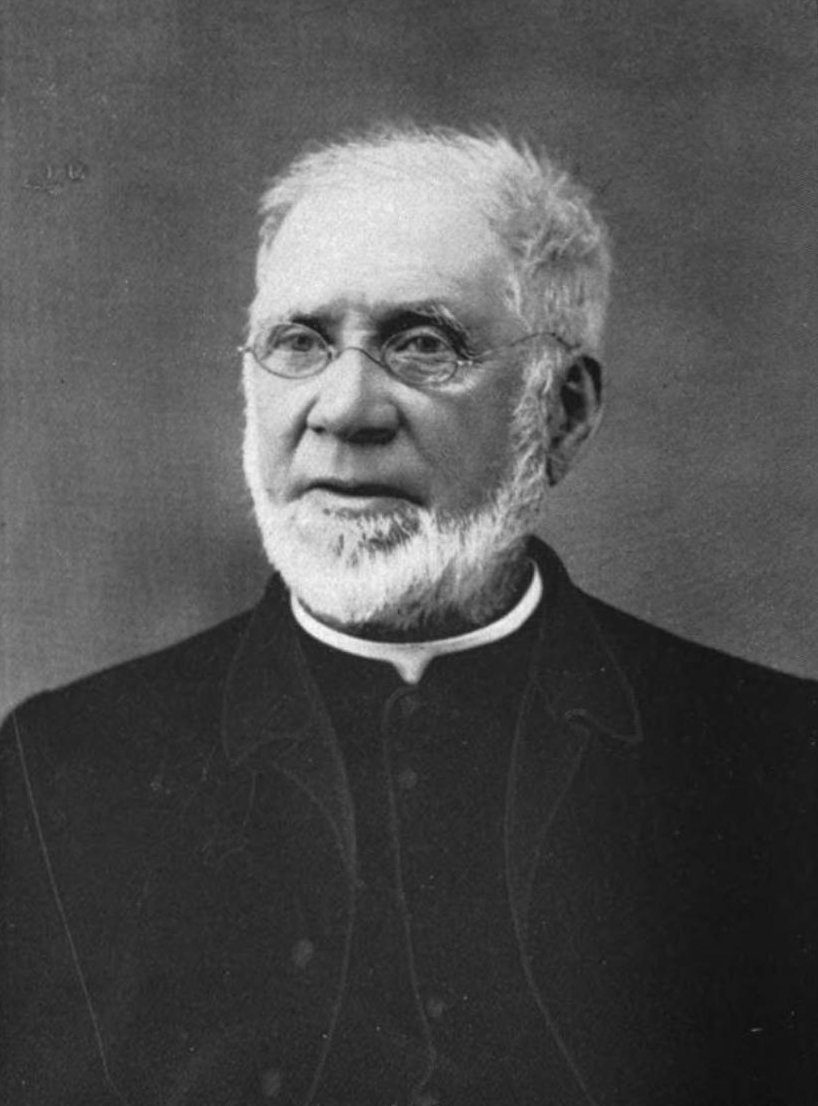
R. W. Oliver, the first Chancellor of the University of Kansas

Chancellors of the University of Kansas
| 1865–67: | R. W. Oliver |
| 1867–74: | John Fraser |
| 1874–83: | James Marvin |
| 1883–89: | Joshua Lippincott |
| 1890–1901: | Francis H. Snow |
| 1902–20: | Frank Strong |
| 1920–39: | Ernest Lindley |
| 1939–51: | Deane Malott |
| 1951–60: | Franklin Murphy |
| 1960–69: | W. Clarke Wescoe |
| 1969–72: | E. Laurence Chalmers |
| 1972–73: | Raymond Nichols |
| 1973–80: | Archie Dykes |
| 1980–81: | Del Shankel (interim) |
| 1981–94: | Gene A. Budig |
| 1994–95: | Del Shankel |
| 1995–2009: | Robert Hemenway |
| 2009–2017: | Bernadette Gray-Little |
| 2017–present | Doug Girod |

The site selected for the university was a hill known as Hogback Ridge or Mount Oread, which was owned by former Kansas Governor Charles L. Robinson. Robinson and his wife Sara traded the 40-acre (160,000 m^{2}) site to the State of Kansas in exchange for land elsewhere. The philanthropist Amos Adams Lawrence donated $10,000 of the necessary endowment fund, and the citizens of Lawrence raised the remaining cash by issuing notes backed by Governor Carney. On November 2, 1863, Governor Carney announced that Lawrence had met the conditions to get the state university, and on March 1, 1864, the University of Kansas was formally chartered.

The school's Board of Regents held its first meeting in March 1865, which is the event that KU dates its founding from. Work on the first college building (Old North College) began later that year. On July 19, 1866, the Board of Regents elected KU's first three faculty members.

The University of Kansas officially opened on September 12, 1866, with 26 girls and 29 boys registered in the preparatory school. The school began teaching college-level classes in 1869, and the first class (of four students) graduated from the university in 1873. It was one of the earliest public institutions of higher learning to admit women and men equally in the United States.

From these beginnings a rivalry with Kansas State, the oldest public institution of higher learning in the state of Kansas, was born.

A student of the early 1870s was writer and journalist Frank Harris, who describes in Volume 1 of his memoirs (My Life and Loves, 1922) the intellectual climate he found in the university at that time. According to him, its New England liberal roots were being overtaken by conservatism.

In April 1874, the school's first serious student publication, Observer of Nature, was issued. In March 1878, former Chancellor James Marvin led the school's first "campus beautification" project, planting over 300 trees, including an area which is now known as the "Marvin Grove".

==== "Rock Chalk Jayhawk" ====
In May 1886, professor Edgar Henry Summerfield Bailey first proposed the cheer that would evolve into the "Rock Chalk Jayhawk, K.U.” chant. Initially created for the KU science club, Bailey's version was "Rah, Rah, Jayhawk, KU" repeated three times. The rahs were later replaced by "Rock Chalk," a transposition of chalk rock, the name for the limestone outcropping found on Mount Oread, site of the Lawrence campus. Over time, the chant became known worldwide. Former U.S. president Theodore Roosevelt declared it the "greatest college chant he'd ever heard." At the 1920 Olympic Games, the King of Belgium asked for a typical American college chant; after discussion, the athletes at the Games agreed on the Rock Chalk chant.

== 1890s–1910s ==
=== Campus growth ===
In 1893 the Kansas Legislature authorized $50,000 for the construction of a new physics and electrical engineering building, a structure resembling a French chateau now remembered as "old" Blake Hall. The following year, the university's library, Spooner Hall was completed and opened. It is now the oldest free-standing building remaining at KU. In 1895, the first long distance ship-to-shore message using underwater wireless technology was transmitted by physics and engineering professor, Lucien I. Blake.

In March 1898, lightning struck the engineering building and the heating plant, starting major fires and destroying both buildings. As a result, former Kansas City businessman George Fowler donated $18,000 to rebuild, which became known as the Fowler Shops. The building is now Stauffer-Flint Hall, home to the journalism school.

Beginning in 1910, electric trolleys began providing service throughout Lawrence and the KU campus. In the same year, Marvin Hall was dedicated as the School of Engineering and Haworth Hall was dedicated for the departments of geology and mineralogy. One year later, a commencement ceremony was held, marking the completion of Potter Lake. On February 8, 1912, a group of KU women organized the Women's Athletic Association, the first group of its kind in the school's history. Due to the graciousness of William B. Thayer and his wife, the university received their personal art collection, valued at $150,000.

=== Professional schools ===
In March 1880, several KU faculty voted to establish a first-year medical course, which was eventually approved by the Board of Regents. This would lead to the creation of the University of Kansas School of Medicine with instruction in medical topics in the undergraduate school. Chemistry professor Edgar Baileyone of the leading influences behind this course of study. However, the idea was more fully developed when professor Samuel Wendell Williston came to Kansas from Yale in 1890, and advanced the idea that a specific two-year course of study for medicine should be implemented at KU. In 1899, Williston was named the first dean of this two-year "medical school" at KU. The ultimate establishment of the KU Medical School came when the University of Kansas Board of Regents authorized the creation of a full four-year medical school at KU in 1905, accomplished by merging the existing two-year school in Lawrence with three Kansas City-area medical colleges.

The School of Engineering was officially founded in 1891, although engineering degrees were awarded as early as 1873. In 1893, the University of Kansas School of Law was founded, expanding the range of interests of KU students.

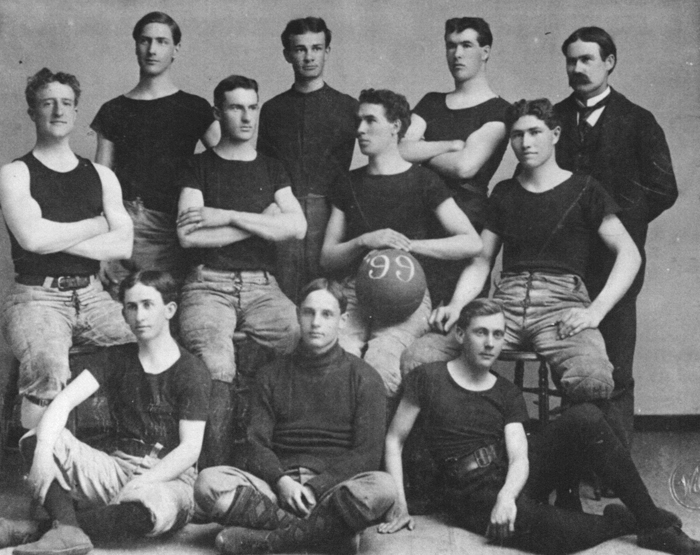
The 1899 University of Kansas basketball team, with Dr. James Naismith at the back right

=== Intercollegiate athletics ===
The 1890s saw the creation of an organized program of athletics at KU. In 1890, the football team was established. It played games at McCook Field from 1892 to 1921.

In 1898, the University of Kansas men's basketball program began, following the arrival of Dr. James Naismith, just six years after Naismith had invented the sport. Naismith was not initially hired to coach basketball, but rather as a chapel director and physical education instructor. In these early days, the majority of the basketball games were played against nearby YMCA teams, with YMCA's across the nation having played an integral part in the birth of basketball. Other common opponents were Haskell Indian Nations University and William Jewell College. Under Naismith, the team played only two current Big 12 schools: Missouri (twice), and Kansas State (once). Naismith was, ironically, the only coach in the program's history to have a losing record (55–60).

== 1920s–1940s ==
In 1921, Memorial Stadium was built to replace McCook Field. The football team still plays in Memorial Stadium, making it the seventh oldest college football stadium in the nation.

On May 13, 1923, William Allen White became the first KU alumnus to win a Pulitzer Prize, which was awarded to him for his Emporia Gazette editorial “To An Anxious Friend” that defended free speech. The School of Business was founded in 1924. The first campus union was built in 1926 as a campus community center. On February 18, 1930, future KU alumnus Clyde Tombaugh announced his discovery of the planet Pluto. Later in the year, present-day Snow Hall was completed and dedicated, replacing the old, deteriorated building. Two years later, one of KU's most prolific football and wrestling stars, Peter Mehringer, qualified for the 1932 Olympics. Several new buildings, including the Watkins Scholarship Hall for female students, were built with donations from Elizabeth Watkins between 1926 and 1937.

A major civil rights decision came on August 8, 1938. Under severe pressure from Kansas Governor Walter Huxman and several civil rights leaders, the Kansas Board of Regents voted to prohibit the practices which had prevented African American students from completing their educational careers at the KU School of Medicine.

The current chancellor's residence was built in 1912 for J.B. and Elizabeth Watkins. Their mansion, known as "The Outlook," was bequeathed to the university at Elizabeth's death in 1939.

In January 1946, the University of Kansas Press was inaugurated. The publishing house would subsequently join with other universities in Kansas, evolving into the statewide University Press of Kansas. Danforth Chapel was officially dedicated in April 1946.

== 1950s–1970s ==
In honor to the 276 KU men and women who died in World War II, the Memorial Carillon and Campanile were formally dedicated on May 27, 1951. On March 26, 1952, the KU men's basketball team won its first NCAA National Championship over St. John's, coached by Forrest Clare "Phog" Allen. Clyde Lovellette of Kansas was named the tournament's Most Outstanding Player, and is still the only player to lead the nation in scoring and lead his team to a national title in the same year. In 1954, the debate team won their first National Debate Tournament. In one of the most cherished occasions in KU history, Allen Fieldhouse dedicated on March 1, 1955. The KU basketball team would go on to win its only home game of the season on the same night. Supervised by chemical engineering professor Russell Mesler, a 10-kilowatt nuclear reactor became operational on campus in 1961. On February 17, 1962, the Kansas Board of Regents voted to replace the original Fraser Hall, claiming it had "outlived its usefulness." The University of Kansas Graduate School approved establishment of a master's degree in nursing in 1967. In 1968, former senator Robert F. Kennedy held presidential nomination speeches at both KU and K-State.

In one of the worst tragedies in KU history, a firebomb blasted throughout the Kansas Union in early 1970, causing nearly $1 million in damages. In 1972, KU began celebrating Carrie Watson Day in honor of the first and longest-serving librarian in the school's history. This same year, the women's rights movement impacted KU in a major way as thirty women, known as the February Sisters, barricaded themselves inside the East Asian Studies building, not leaving until they received an audience with the university administration. They listed a number of demands, such as childcare for students and the implementation of a Women's Studies Program. Many of their demands were met over the next decade. The School of Nursing was established in 1974 as a joint and co-equal unit of the KU Medical Center. The debate team experienced more success throughout the 1970s, winning the National Debate Tournament in 1970 and 1976. On February 21, 1978, former U.S. President Gerald Ford and several dignitaries dedicated the new KU School of Law, Green Hall.

== 1980s–1990s ==
In 1983, the debate team won the National Debate Tournament for the fourth time. KU dedicated its Vietnam Memorial in 1986, the first university in the country to construct such a monument. Led by Danny Manning, the KU men's basketball team won the NCAA championship for the first time in 36 years on April 4, 1988, in Kansas City, Missouri. This team would later become known as Danny Manning and the Miracles. On June 15, 1991, a second major disaster struck the university. Lightning struck Hoch Auditorium, sparking a fire which destroyed the building in less than an hour.

In 1993, the KU Edwards Campus was established in Overland Park, Kansas in order to provide adults with the opportunity to complete college degrees and to further their education. The Edwards campus began providing programs developmental psychology, public administration, social work, systems analysis, engineering management and design.

== Recent years: 2000–present ==
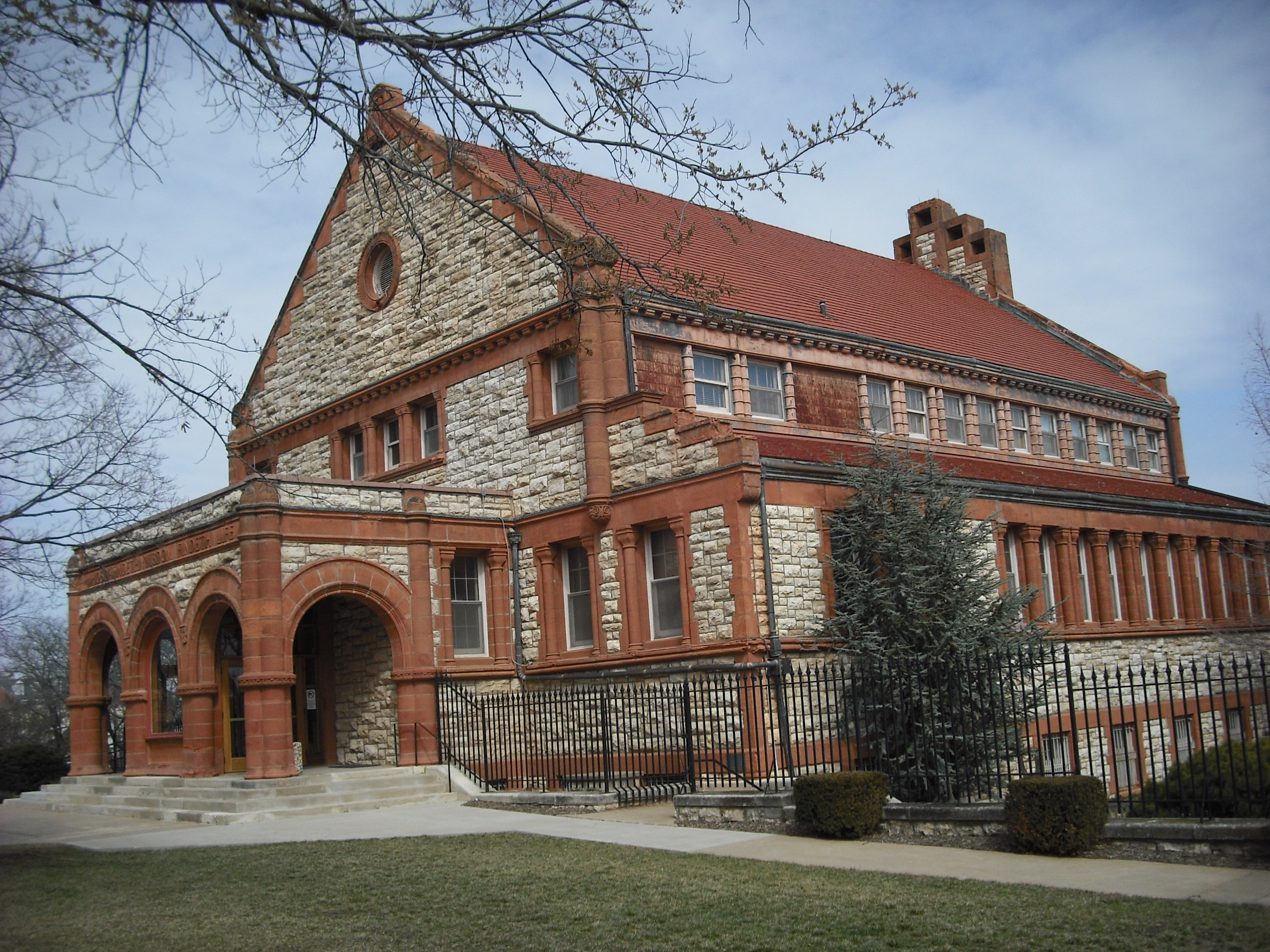
Spooner Hall, built in 1894, is the oldest free-standing building on the KU campus.

In athletics, the men's basketball team made it to the Final Four in 2002 and lost the National Championship in 2003 to the Syracuse Orangemen. Lew Perkins, previously at Connecticut, replaced Al Bohl as the university's athletic director in 2003. Under Perkins's administration, the department's budget increased from $27.2 million in 2003 (10th in the conference) to over $50 million thanks in large part to money raised from a new priority seating policy at Allen Fieldhouse, a new $26.67 million eight-year contract with Adidas replacing an existing contract with Nike, and a new $40.2 million seven-year contract with ESPN Regional Television. In the summer of 2003, the Dole Institute of Politics was officially completed, in honor of former senator and KU alumnus, Bob Dole.

The football team, led by former coach Mark Mangino, won the 2008 Orange Bowl and finished the season 12–1. In 2008, the men's basketball team defeated the Memphis Tigers in San Antonio to win KU's third NCAA Basketball Championship. After rebounding from a late-game deficit, tournament Most Outstanding Player Mario Chalmers made a three-point shot to force overtime. The Jayhawks went on to win with a score of 75–68. Additionally, in 2009, the debate team won the National Debate Tournament for the fifth time in school history. Also in 2009, Bernadette Gray-Little became the first woman and African American to serve as chancellor at the university. Gray-Little retired on June 30, 2017.

On 1 May 2024, KU students joined other campuses in setting up encampments and protesting against the Gaza war and the alleged genocide there. The students called for divestment from companies associated with Israel. They also called out the university's relationship with local company ICL, the manufacturer of white phosphorus, an illegal weapon used to commit war crimes by Israel. Jewish student organisations organised a counter protest, but there were also Jewish students protesting against the war. The protests led to arrests, and also former students drawing parallels with the protests against apartheid in South Africa at the campus.

== See also ==
- List of oldest buildings on Kansas colleges and universities
