= Barbara F. Atkinson =

American academic

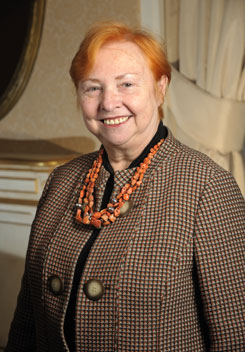

1st Dean of the UNLV School of Medicine
- In office May 19, 2014 – June 30, 2019; Planning dean: May 19, 2014 – November 10, 2015
- Preceded by: Position established
- Succeeded by: John Fildes (interim); Marc Kahn

6th Executive Vice Chancellor of the University of Kansas Medical Center
- In office January 1, 2005 – June 30, 2012
- Chancellor: Bernadette Gray-Little
- Preceded by: Donald F. Hagen
- Succeeded by: Doug Girod

14th Executive Dean of the University of Kansas School of Medicine
- In office July 1, 2002 – June 30, 2012
- Preceded by: Deborah Powell
- Succeeded by: Robert Simari

Interim Chancellor of the University of Kansas
- In office July 1, 2009 – August 15, 2009
- Preceded by: Robert Hemenway
- Succeeded by: Bernadette Gray-Little

Personal details
- Born: Barbara Frajola; 1942 (age 83–84) Minnesota, U.S.
- Spouse: G. William Atkinson
- Children: 1 son, 1 daughter
- Education: College of Wooster (BA); Thomas Jefferson University (MD)
- Profession: Medical Doctor; Professor; University Administrator

Barbara Atkinson (née Frajola; born c. 1942) is an American former educator, medical doctor, and university administrator. From 2014 until 2019, she helped create the UNLV School of Medicine. Prior to time at UNLV, she was the executive vice chancellor for the University of Kansas Medical Center for 10 years, and the executive dean for the University of Kansas School of Medicine for 12 years. Prior to moving to Kansas, Atkinson worked in Pennsylvania.

== Biography ==
=== Early years ===
Atkinson was born in Minnesota. She attended College of Wooster where she graduated with a bachelor of arts and attended the Thomas Jefferson University Medical College to receive her medical degree. After earning her medical degree, she was hired at the University of Pennsylvania School of Medicine, where she served as an associate professor and director of the cytopathology laboratory from 1978 to 1987. In 1987, she left to become professor and chair for the Pathology and Laboratory Medicine department at the Medical College of Pennsylvania from 1987 to 1996 and later served as the school's dean from 1996 to 1999.

=== University of Kansas Medical Center ===
Atkinson left Pennsylvania to become the chair for the KU Medical Center's Department of Pathology and Laboratory Medicine in 2000. Just two years later in 2002, she was named the sixth executive dean for the school of medicine, which oversees both the Kansas City and Wichita, Kansas campuses. As Executive Vice Chancellor, Atkinson made her number one priority to achieve the National Cancer Institute's comprehensive cancer center designation for KU's Cancer Center, which was designated on July 12, 2012. During her time as executive vice chancellor, she opened a new campus for the medical school in Salina, Kansas in 2011, oversaw the Medical Center's largest research operations expansion, and expanded its Wichita campus to a four-year school. Atkinson retired on June 30, 2012, and left as the first and only woman to serve as both the executive vice chancellor and executive dean for the Medical Center.

In April 2010, US President Barack Obama appointed Atkinson to the Presidential Commission for the Study of Bioethical Issues.

From July 2009 to August 2009, Atkinson served as the interim chancellor for the University of Kansas.

=== University of Nevada, Las Vegas ===
On May 19, 2014, the University of Nevada, Las Vegas announced Atkinson as its planning dean for the new school of medicine. She was hired to develop and form a new medical school, oversee academic planning, fundraising, and establish a community advisory committee. She helped fundraise $13.5 million in 60 days to create student scholarships. She was named the founding dean on November 10, 2015. She resigned September 1, 2019.
