= Akinlolu Ojo =

Nigerian academic

Akinlolu O. Ojo is a Nigerian-born physician, nephrologist, and academic administrator. He is the executive dean of the University of Kansas School of Medicine and a professor of medicine and population health. He was elected to the National Academy of Medicine in 2022 for his work on racial disparities in chronic kidney disease and kidney transplantation and clinical research on chronic kidney disease.

== Education ==
In 1985, Ojo received his MBBS from the University of Lagos. In 1988, he earned a Master of Public Health from the University of Alabama at Birmingham. He took nephrology training at the University of Michigan. In 1995, he earned a PhD in epidemiology. In 2011, he received an MBA from the University of Michigan Ross School of Business.

== Academic career ==
Ojo served at the University of Arizona as associate vice president for clinical research and global health initiatives. He participated in the All of Us Research Program, which seeks to create a large health and genomic research database containing information from participants representing diverse populations.

In June 2019, the University of Kansas selected Ojo as executive dean of its School of Medicine. He succeeded Robert Simari in the position.

In 2022, Ojo was elected to the National Academy of Medicine.

== Research ==
Ojo's research has examined kidney disease, kidney transplantation, organ donation, and racial and ethnic disparities in kidney health. His earlier transplantation research included studies of outcomes among recipients of deceased-donor kidneys and the survival benefits associated with transplantation.

He was also the lead author of a study published in the New England Journal of Medicine that examined chronic renal failure following transplantation of nonrenal solid organs.

Ojo's work has also addressed racial and ethnic differences in kidney transplantation. He was a coauthor of a study examining differences in graft and recipient survival among elderly kidney transplant recipients, published in the Journal of the American Geriatrics Society.

In a 2009 article in Kidney News, Ojo described disparities in kidney transplantation in the United States, including differences in access to transplantation, organ donation, and transplant outcomes among Black and white patients.

Ojo led the development of the National Living Donor Assistance Center, which was established to reduce financial barriers associated with living organ donation.

In a 2023 study published in the New England Journal of Medicine, Ojo, Dwomoa Adu and Rasheed Gbadegesin described the role of apolipoprotein L1 kidney risk variants in kidney disease in West Africa.
