= Shankel =

Shankel is a surname. Notable people with the surname include:

- Del Shankel (1927–2018), American microbiologist
- Shaun Shankel, American songwriter
