= Shea Gordon =

Shea Gordon may refer to:

- Shea Gordon (artist)
- Shea Gordon (footballer)
