= Matthew Macaluso =

Professor of Psychiatry

Matthew Macaluso, D.O. is Professor of Psychiatry and Bee McWane Reid Endowed Chair in Mood Disorders at the University of Alabama at Birmingham-Heersink School of Medicine.

== Early life and career ==
Matthew Macaluso graduated with a Bachelor of Arts from Rutgers University. He earned his medical degree from the University of Medicine and Dentistry of New Jersey. Macaluso completed his residency training in psychiatry and fellowship in psychopharmacology research under Sheldon Preskorn, M.D. at the University of Kansas Medical Center (KUMC) in 2009.

From 2009 to 2020, Macaluso was on faculty at KUMC and served as director of residency training. Macaluso was also a founding leader of the KU-Wichita Center for Clinical Research. In 2020, Macaluso was recruited to UAB as Professor and Clinical Director of the UAB Depression and Suicide Center. In 2020, he was appointed by the Board of Trustees of the University of Alabama as Bee McWane Reid Endowed Chair in Mood Disorders. In 2022, Macaluso became Vice Chair for Clinical Affairs at UAB.

Macaluso has contributed most in the area of novel treatment development as well as psychopharmacology education. His work helps train clinicians on the process of developing new medication treatments, evaluating the literature and how to introduce new medications and devices into the treatment of their patients.

Macaluso is lead editor of the Handbook of Practical Psychopharmacology, a clinical reference published by American Psychiatric Publishing (APPI) that provides concise, evidence-based summaries of more than 130 psychiatric medications and their clinical use. The book was designed as a practical prescribing guide for clinicians and trainees and received a positive review in the peer-reviewed Journal of Psychiatric Practice, which noted its usefulness as a concise reference for everyday psychopharmacologic decision-making.

Macaluso has also contributed to national efforts in psychopharmacology education. Together with Richard Shelton, he helped lead the re-development of the national psychopharmacology curriculum created by the American Society of Clinical Psychopharmacology (ASCP), an initiative aimed at modernizing and standardizing psychopharmacology training for psychiatry residents and medical students in the United States.

His research focuses on clinical trials and translational studies in mood disorders, including investigations of emerging pharmacologic treatments, medication adherence strategies, and the clinical evaluation of novel therapeutics. Macaluso has also participated in collaborative research and consensus efforts in psychopharmacology, including work with ASCP task forces addressing issues such as the deprescribing of psychotropic medications.

== Awards ==
- 2015 Early Career Achievement in Medicine Award from the University of Kansas Alumni Association
- 2019 Distinguished Fellow of the American Psychiatric Association
- 2020 Innovation Award as presented by the Wichita Business Journal
