= Logan Clendening =

American physician and medical writer (1884–1945)

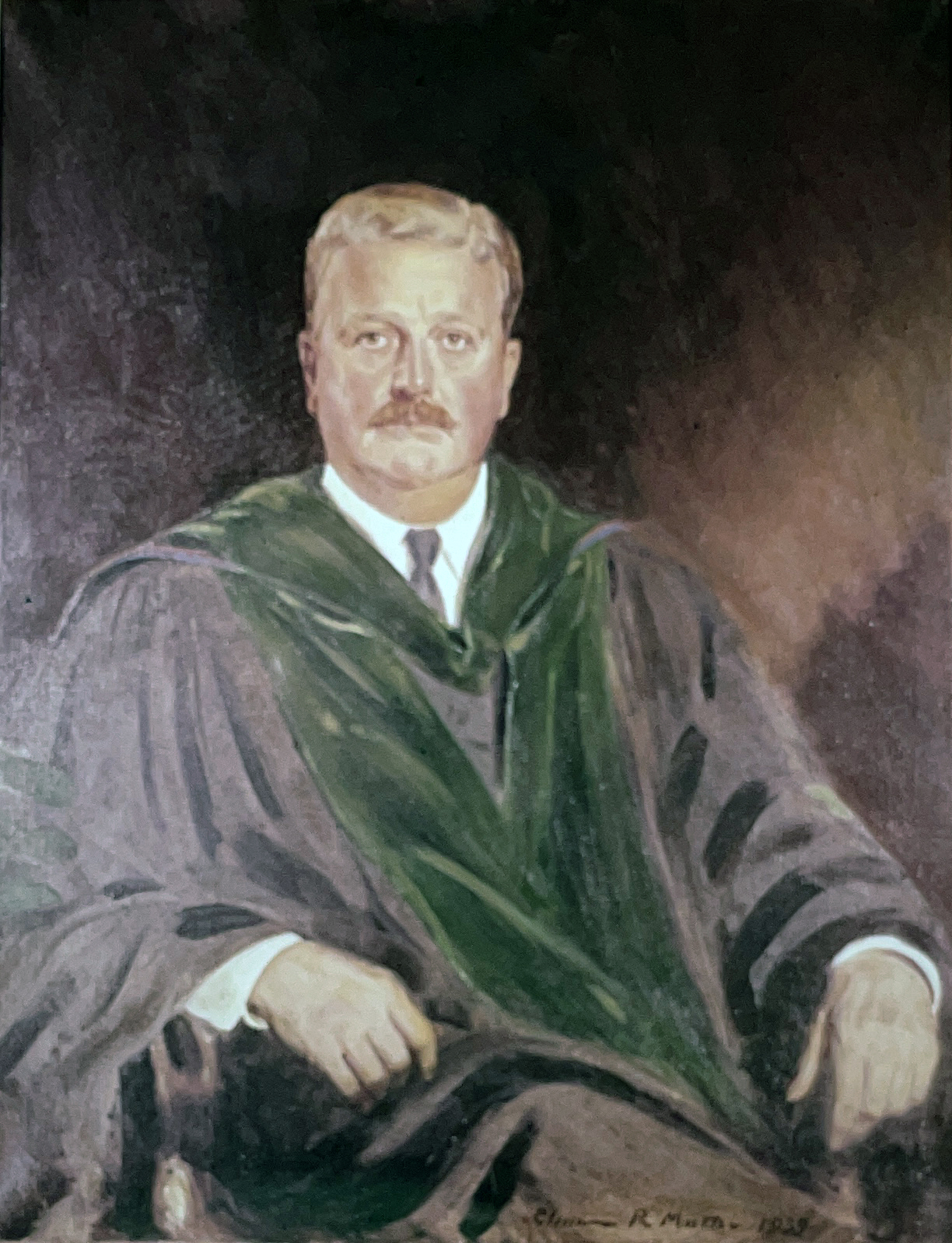
- Oil Portrait of Clendening, c. 1939
- Born: May 25, 1884; Kansas City, Missouri, U.S.
- Died: January 31, 1945 (aged 60); Kansas City, Missouri, U.S.
- Resting place: Independence, Missouri, U.S.
- Education: University of Kansas (M.D.)
- Occupations: Physician; medical writer; Historian
- Spouse: Dorothy Scott Hixon (m. 1914)
- Children: 1

Logan Clendening (May 25, 1884 – January 31, 1945) was an American physician, historian, and medical writer.

== Family ==
The Clendening family were staunch Jacobites, fleeing Scotland after the fall of King James II of England. As a child, Clendening recalled his grandfather parading up and down the family street wearing a white rose in his buttonhole and vowing "confusion to the Hanoverian usurpers" every year on June 10.

== Early life ==
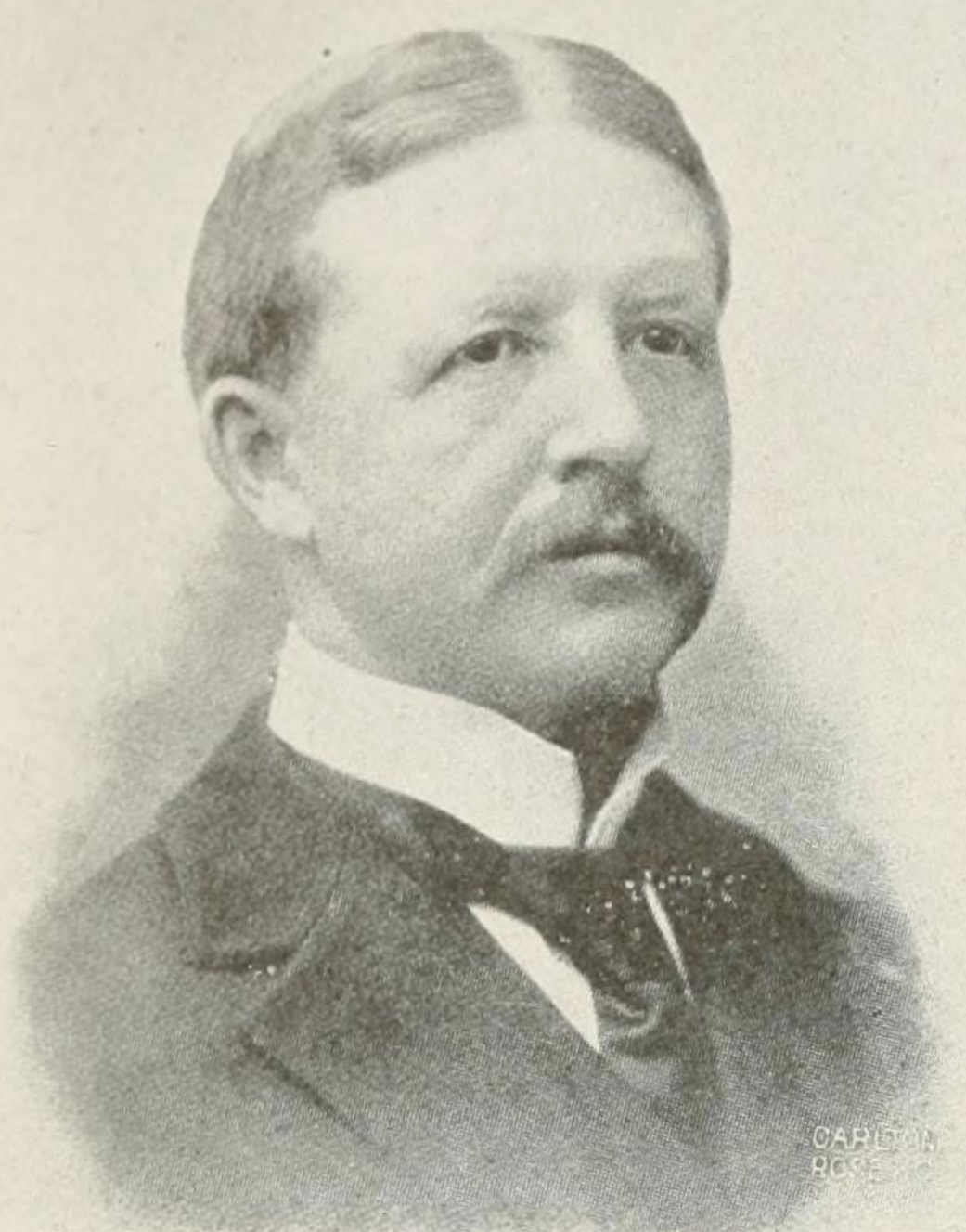
Edward McKaig Clendening, father of Logan Clendening (c. 1901)

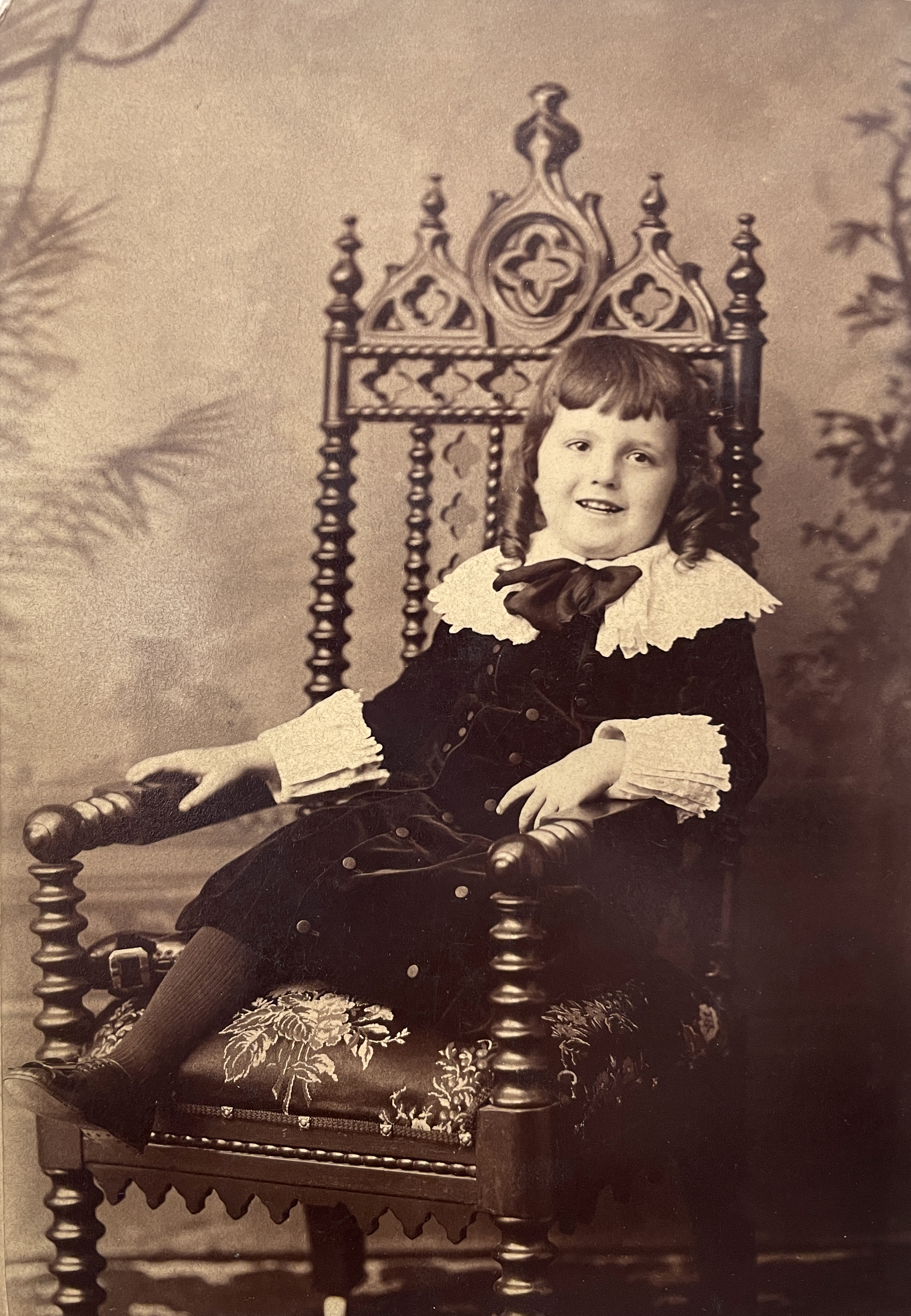
Logan Clendening as a young child (c. 1888)

Logan Clendening was born on May 25, 1884, in Kansas City, Missouri. He was the son of Lide (née Logan) and Edwin McKaig Clendening. His father was a merchant and served as president of the Kansas City Commercial Club. He was educated in the Kansas City Public Schools, going on to study at the University of Michigan and the University of Kansas. In 1907, he received a Doctor of Medicine from the University of Kansas School of Medicine.

== Career ==
Clendening was Professor of Clinical Medicine and Professor of Medical History at the University of Kansas School of Medicine, later part of the University of Kansas Medical Center. He held an instructorship at the institution from 1912 until his death in 1945.

In 1911, Clendening joined the Army Medical Corps Reserve as a first lieutenant. He was called up on June 5, 1917, and served first as a captain, then a major at Fort Sam Houston in the U.S. Army Medical Corps. He was discharged in December 1918. Clendening was the author of the successful book The Human Body, in 1945 it was noted that one and a half million copies had been sold. He became well known for his medical journalism and columns that appeared in many daily newspapers. He took interest in collecting old medical textbooks, researching the Shakespeare authorship question and studying the writings of Charles Dickens, and Arthur Conan Doyle's Sherlock Holmes stories.

The University of Kansas Medical Center has described Clendening as "the greatest popularizer of Medicine in America in the first half of the twentieth century."

== Personal life ==
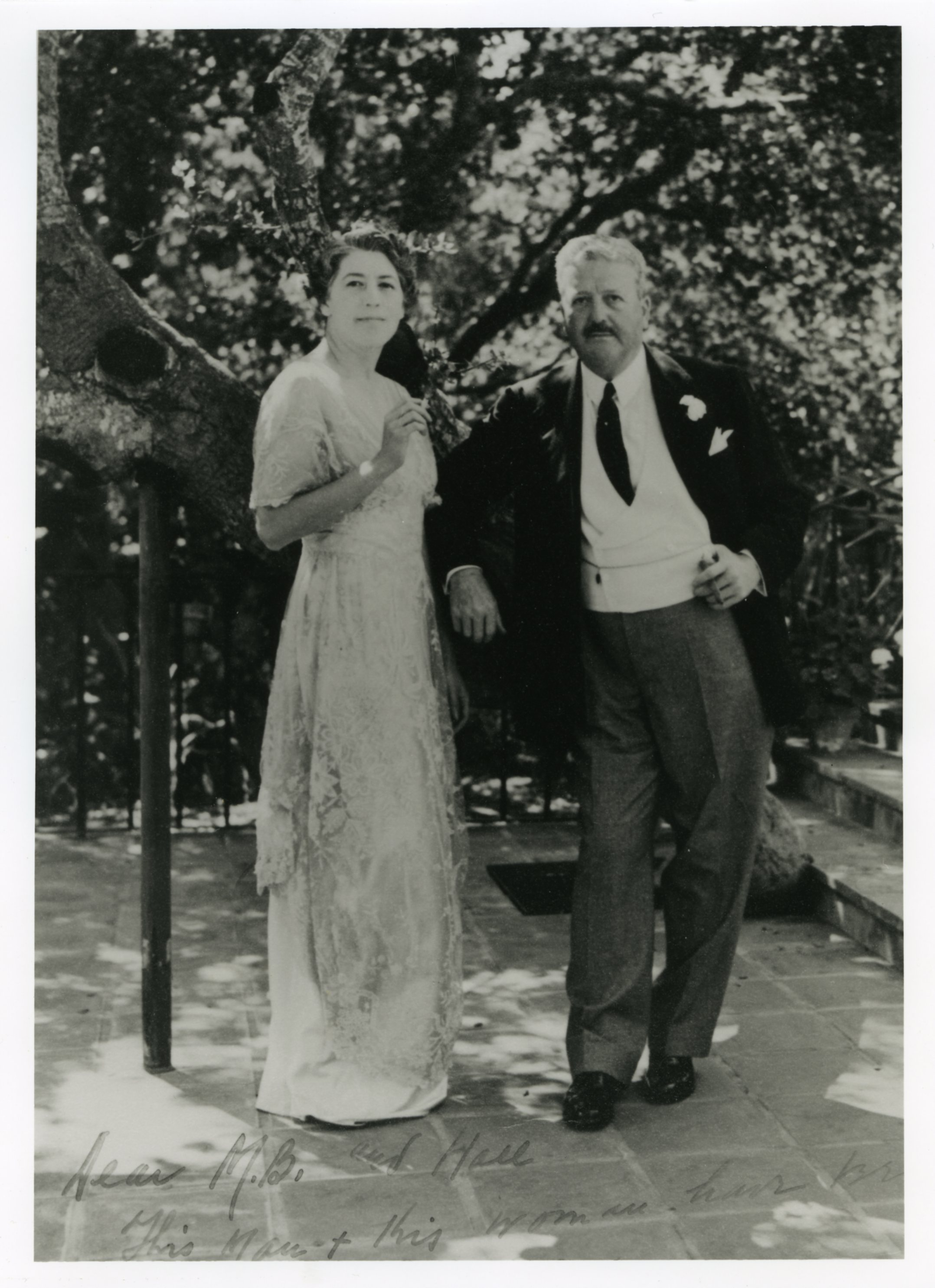
Dr. Logan Clendening and Dorothy Hixon Clendening, circa 1940.

In the early 1910s he met Dorothy Scott Hixon, the daughter of Frank Pennell Hixon, a wealthy lumber and banking baron from LaCrosse, Wisconsin. They courted long-distance for several years, and married on July 22, 1914. Their only child was born premature on July 4, 1920, and died after a few hours.

Through the publication of his first book, Modern Methods of Treatment, in 1924, Clendening became friends with H. L. Mencken, who encouraged his career as a popular medical writer.

In his later years, Clendening suffered from depression and failing health. On January 31, 1945, he committed suicide by cutting his throat and wrists with a knife.

== Publications ==
- The Human Body (1927)
- Modern Methods Of Treatment (1928)
- Behind the Doctor (1933)
- The Care and Feeding of Adults (1933)
- Handbook To Pickwick Papers (1936)
- The Balanced Diet (1936)
- Workbook in Elementary Diagnosis for Teaching Clinical History Recording and Physical Diagnosis (1938)
- Source Book of Medical History (1942, 1960)
- The Logan Clendening Collection of Books About the Bacon-Shakespeare Controversy (1943)
- Methods Of Diagnosis (1947) [with Edward H. Hashinger]
