= University of Kansas School of Nursing =

Nursing school in Kansas City, Kansas, U.S.

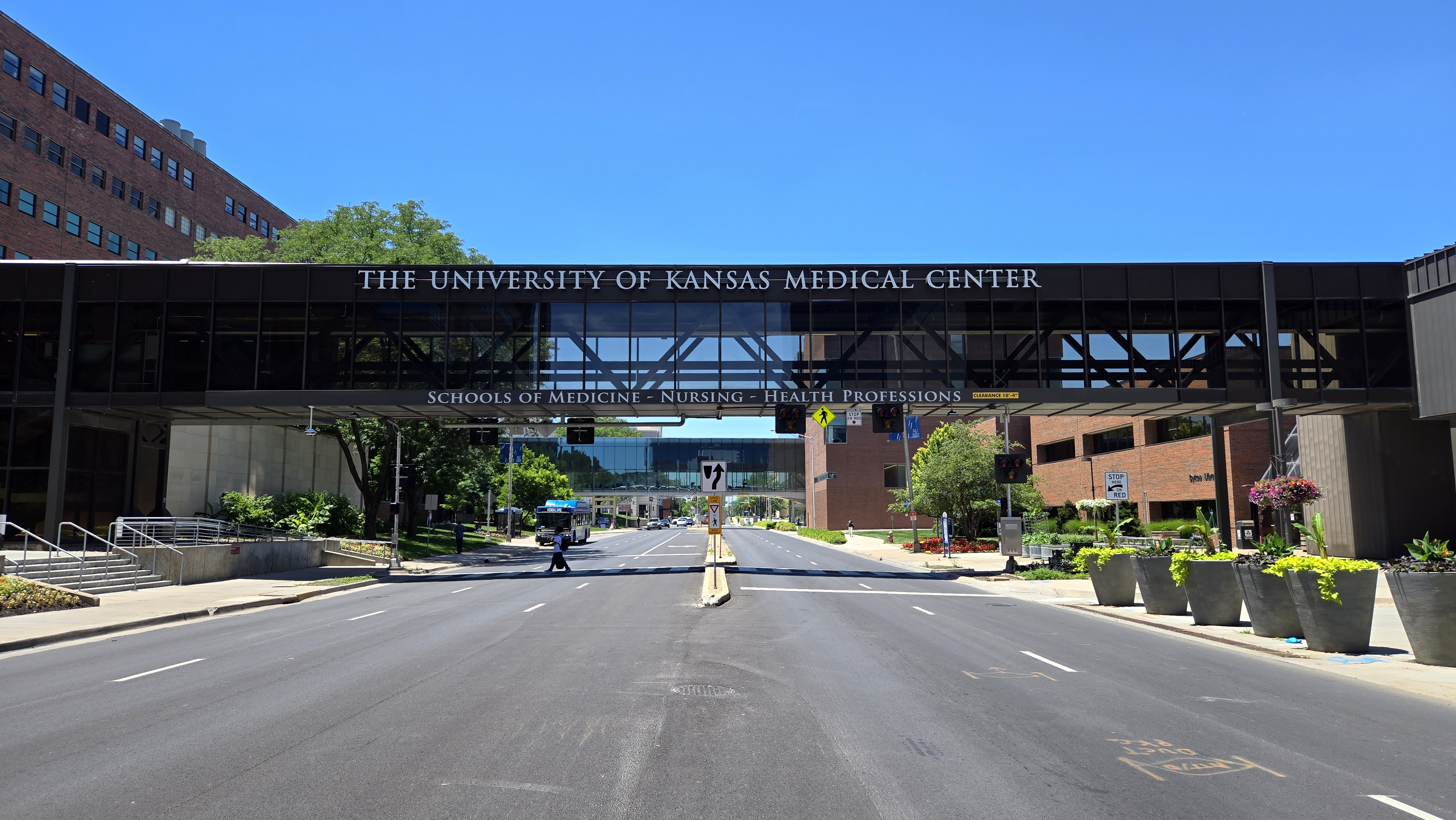
- Type: Nursing school
- Established: July 1, 1906
- Parent institution: University of Kansas Medical Center
- Chancellor: Douglas A. Girod
- Vice-Chancellor: Steve Stites
- Dean: Jean Foret Giddens
- Location: Kansas City, Kansas, U.S. 39.0566°N 94.6113°W
- Campus: Multiple sites
- Website: www.kumc.edu/school-of-nursing.html
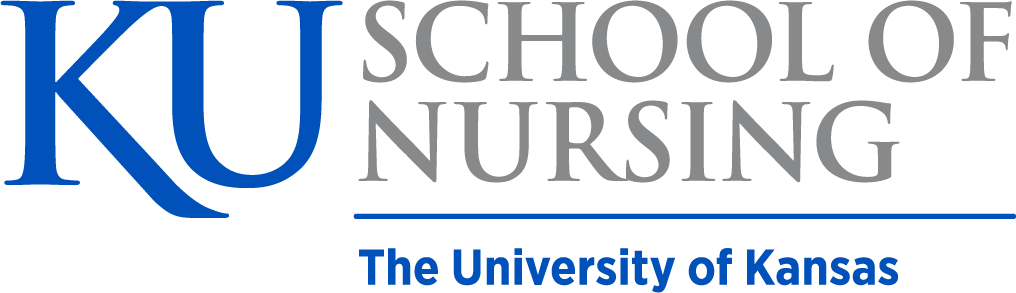

The University of Kansas School of Nursing is a public educational institution and the constituent nursing school of the University of Kansas Medical Center. Founded in 1906, its primary campus is located at the University of Kansas Medical Center's main campus in Kansas City, Kansas. It also maintains a campus in Salina, Kansas.

== History ==
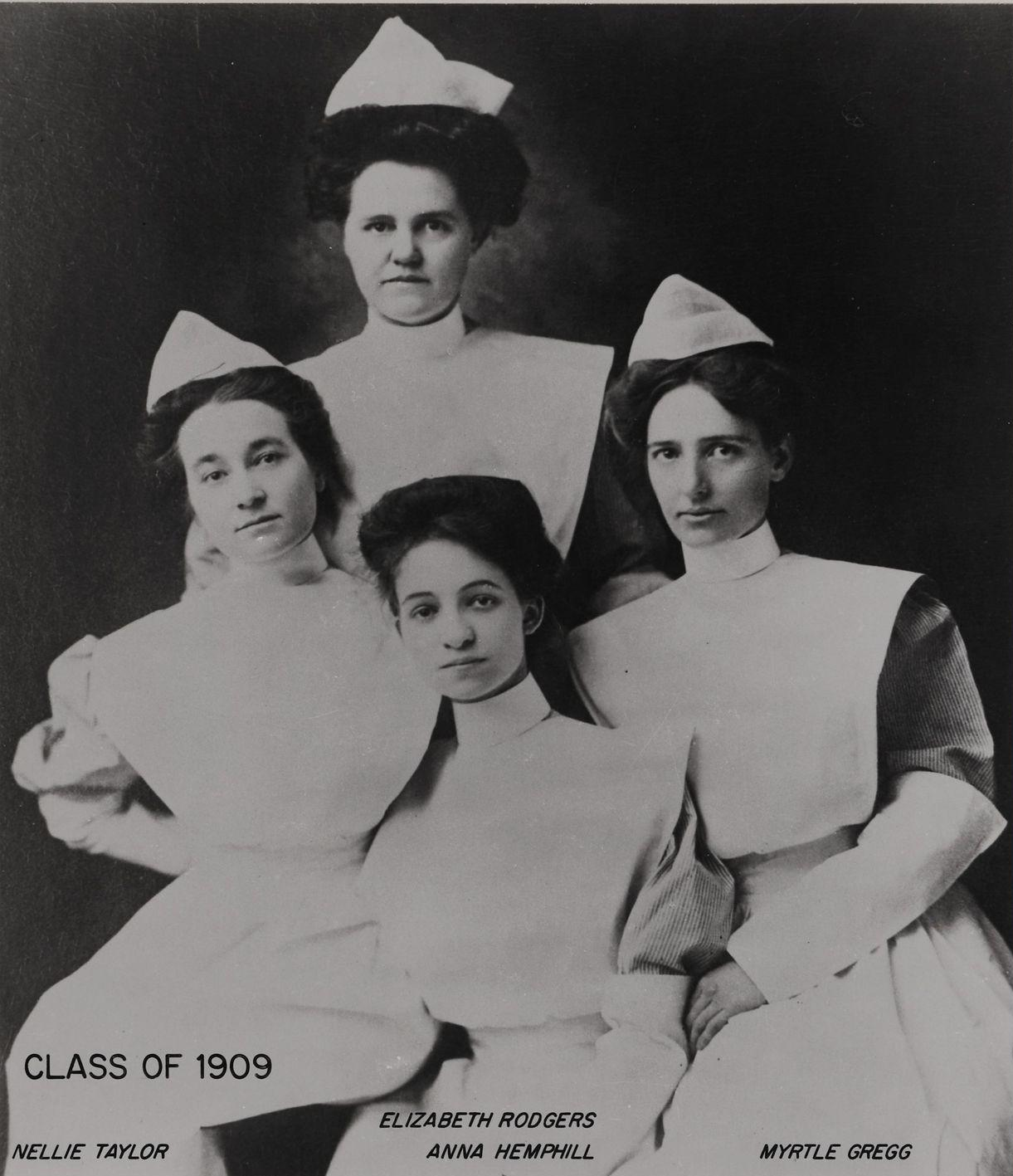
Photograph of the class of 1909

The school officially opened on July 1, 1906, as the Eleanor Taylor Bell Hospital and Training School for Nurses in the Rosedale area of Kansas City, Kansas. Functioning as a part of the University of Kansas School of Medicine, the program was under the direct authority of the medical school dean, who controlled the curriculum and the hiring of the nursing superintendent. Pearl Laptad was hired as the first superintendent, overseeing both hospital nursing services and the instruction of the first class of students, who graduated in 1909.

The early curriculum followed a three-year apprenticeship model and covered 25 topics, such as anatomy, chemistry, dietetics, obstetrics, pediatrics, and surgery. Students typically worked six ten-hour days per week in the hospital wards and received approximately six hours of classroom instruction. By 1912, this totaled 279 clock hours of instruction over the entire three-year enrollment. In exchange for working, "pupil nurses" received room, board, and a monthly stipend ($8 for new students and $15 for senior students). The students were subject to strict codes of conduct, which until 1941 included a ban on marriage.

In 1915, with 24 student nurses enrolled, the program was nearly shut down when the Kansas Board of Administration (predecessor of the Kansas Board of Regents) directed the school to stop accepting new students due to the cost of the program. The then superintendent, S. Milo Hinch, successfully appealed this order by appearing before the board, eventually securing a compromise that allowed for the admission of new students to replace those leaving the program. In 1917, the school received its first official accreditation from the Kansas State Board of Nursing.

In 1925, the school began requiring a high school diploma for all applicants, a standard the state board did not mandate until 1933. While a Bachelor of Science in Nursing (BSN) track was introduced in 1929, it existed alongside the traditional diploma program until 1953, when the final diploma class graduated. Under the leadership of E. Jean M. Hill, the diploma and certificate tracks were phased out, establishing the degree-based curriculum as the only path for nursing education at the university.

Administrative changes in 1956 permanently separated nursing education from the direction of hospital nursing services. This allowed the faculty to focus on academic accreditation and research. The department received its first national accreditation from the National League for Nursing Education in 1952, achieving full status by late 1959. The department operated with increasing independence and was approved by the Board of Regents to offer a Master of Science in Nursing in 1968.

On April 1, 1974, the nursing program transitioned from departmental status to a separate professional school within the University of Kansas Medical Center. The reorganization, led by executive vice-chancellor William Rieke, established the School of Nursing as an autonomous unit independent of the School of Medicine. Hester Thurston was appointed as the school's first dean. Following this change, the school established a Ph.D. program in 1983. In 2000, a 100,000-square-foot school of nursing building was completed at the Kansas City campus.

In 2012, the school established the KU-Community College Partnership, allowing students to work toward an associate degree in nursing at select community colleges and also earn Bachelor of Science in Nursing simultaneously. In 2017, the school opened a satellite campus in Salina, Kansas. Developed in partnership with the Salina Regional Health Center, the Salina campus was intended to address nursing shortages in rural areas of the state and utilizes a combination of on-site clinical instruction and distance learning.

== Academics ==
The school offers undergraduate and doctoral degrees and postgraduate certificate programs. As of 2026, the school's undergraduate offerings include a pre-licensure Bachelor of Science in Nursing (BSN), an online RN-BSN track for registered nurses with associate degrees and nursing diplomas, and a dual-enrollment partnership with select community colleges that allows students to earn an associate degree and a BSN concurrently. At the graduate level, the school offers a Doctor of Nursing Practice (DNP) with concentrations in family nurse practitioner, nurse-midwifery, psychiatric-mental health, and organizational leadership. A post-master's DNP and a research-focused Ph.D. in nursing are also offered. In addition to degree programs, the school grants postgraduate certificates in clinical specialties such as family nurse practitioner, nurse-midwifery, and psychiatric-mental health, as well as functional areas including health professions educator and health systems leadership.
