= Barry Festoff =

- Born: Barry Festoff; July 30, 1940 (age 85); New York, New York, United States
- Website: www.phlogistix.com

Barry Festoff is a board-certified neurologist, Professor of Neurology at the University of Kansas Medical Center and the founder of pHLOGISTIX, a neurodiagnostic and therapeutic biotech company.

== Early life ==
Barry Festoff grew up in South Florida and attended the University of Florida at Gainesville. He then attended and completed his medical degree at the University of Miami. Inspired by research in neurologic diseases, he interned at the Duke University Hospital and was accepted into the Research Training Program in Molecular Biology at Duke University Medical School. He then spent two years in a Neurology residency at University of Miami - Jackson Memorial Hospital. Barry is married to Kansas City artist, Shea Gordon.

== Career ==
During the Vietnam War era, he spent his military requirement doing research at the Medical Neurology Branch of the National Institute of Neurological Diseases and Blindness in Bethesda, Maryland. At NIH he established a new laboratory, the Muscle Membrane Biochemistry Laboratory, branching into novel state-of-the-art research in the field. In 1976, he was recruited to the University of Kansas Medical Center (KUMC) to establish a clinical neurology service and the Neurobiology Research Laboratory at the Kansas City VA Medical Center. During the course of 35 years researching, he was awarded the Medical Investigator Research Award and won other awards. During that time he was inducted into the American Society for Clinical Investigation, the American Neurological Association, and the American Society for Biochemistry and Molecular Biology. He has published more 200 scientific articles and edited three books. He retired from the VA in 2010 and founded pHLOGISTIX, a neurodiagnostic and therapeutic biotech company, while still a professor at KUMC.

== pHLOGISTIX ==
Dr. Festoff's career has involved translational research into neurologic diseases, especially the relationship between neurotrauma and its evolution to neurodegeneration. His lifetime of research has led to the founding of pHLOGISTIX, a company that focuses on blood-based biomarkers as companion diagnostics for neurotrauma and neurodegenerative diseases such as chronic traumatic encephalopathy (CTE), Alzheimer's disease (AD), frontotemporal dementia (FTD), Parkinson's disease (PD) and amyotrophic lateral sclerosis (ALS) in order to harness neuroinflammation and improve functional outcomes following trauma to the central nervous system (CNS). The ultimate goal is to provide a validated panel of nucleic acid and protein biomarkers in a novel analytic approach to allow the identification of patients with CTE and AD before symptoms develop, i.e., preclinical, while still at the stage of mild cognitive impairment, especially after early detection of concussions.
