= Doug Girod =

American educator and physician (born 1958)

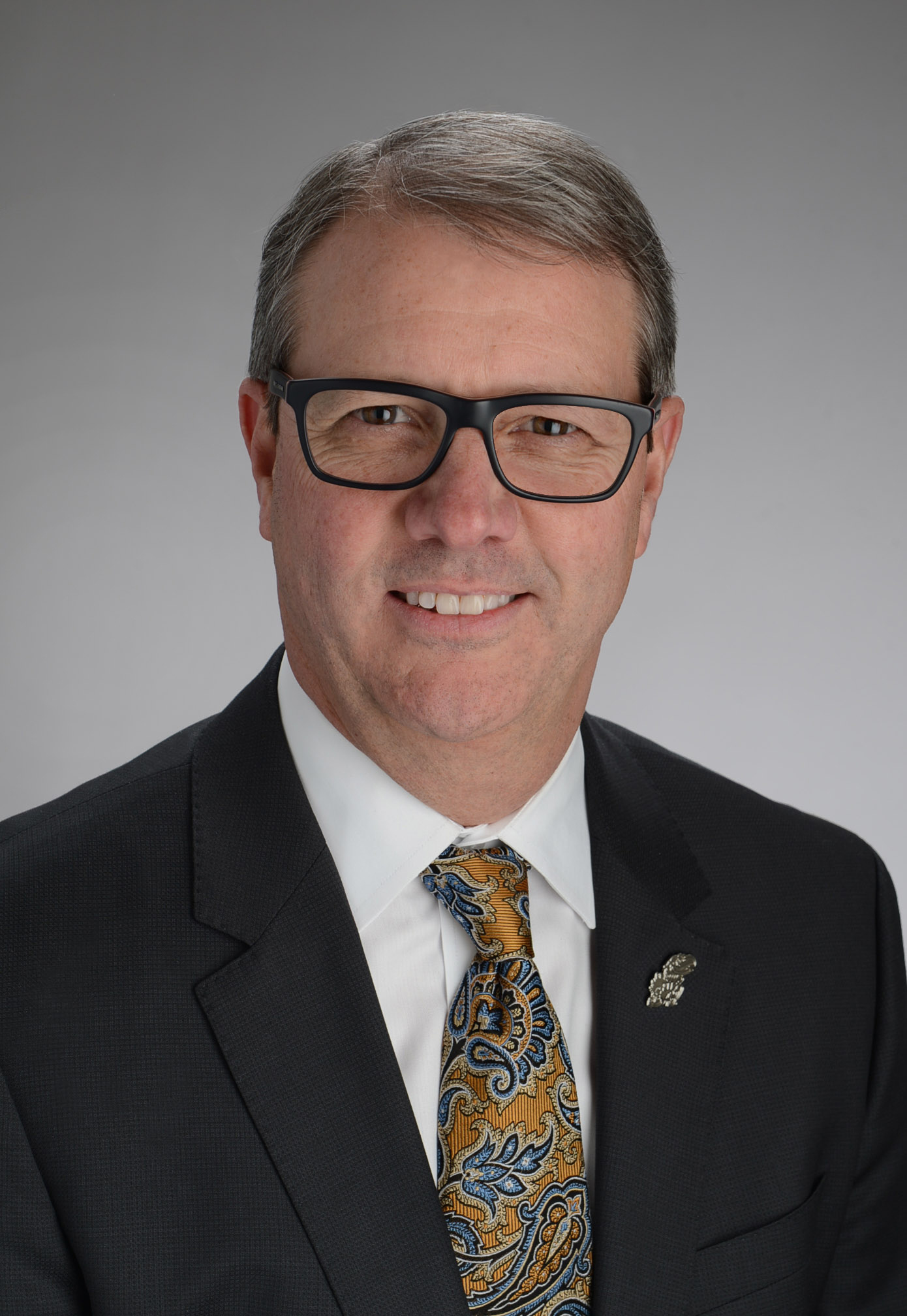
- Girod in 2017

18th Chancellor of the University of Kansas
- Incumbent
- Assumed office July 1, 2017
- Provost: Barbara Bichelmeyer
- Preceded by: Bernadette Gray-Little

7th Executive Vice Chancellor of the University of Kansas Medical Center
- In office February 1, 2013 – June 30, 2017
- Chancellor: Bernadette Gray-Little
- Preceded by: Barbara F. Atkinson
- Succeeded by: Robert Simari

Executive Dean of the University of Kansas School of Medicine
- Acting
- In office February 1, 2013 – March 23, 2014
- Preceded by: Barbara Atkinson
- Succeeded by: Robert Simari

Personal details
- Born: Douglas Allan Girod; May 5, 1958 (age 68) Salem, Oregon, U.S.
- Spouse: Susan Pirtle
- Children: 3
- Education: University of California, Davis (BS); University of California, San Francisco (MD)

Military service
- Allegiance: United States
- Branch/service: United States Navy
- Years of service: 1982–1997
- Rank: Lieutenant Commander
- Unit: Navy Reserve
- Awards: Meritorious Service Medal

Douglas Allan Girod (born May 5, 1958) is an American educator, medical doctor, and the 18th chancellor of the University of Kansas. Prior to becoming chancellor, he was the University of Kansas Medical Center's executive vice chancellor, a position he had held since February 2013. Before being promoted to the executive vice chancellor at the University of Kansas Medical Center, Girod was the senior dean for the School of Medicine while dually serving as a surgeon at the University of Kansas Health System where he began his career in 1994. He is also a veteran of the United States Navy Reserve.

== Biography ==
=== Education ===
Girod was born and raised in Salem, Oregon. He graduated from the University of California, Davis, with a Bachelor of Science in chemistry, then attended the University of California, San Francisco, for his doctorate of medicine, and completed his residency and an National Institute of Health research fellowship at the University of Washington in Seattle.

=== Career ===
Beginning in 1982, Girod began his 15-year career in the United States Navy Reserve where he worked at the Naval Hospital Oakland as a surgeon and the Director of Otolaryngology. In 1997, Girod was honorably discharged from the military, ending his career as a Lieutenant Commander. In 1994, Girod left California to become a surgeon at the KU Medical Center. During his time at the KU Medical Center, Girod was a professor, department chair, senior associate dean, interim executive dean, and his most recent post of executive vice chancellor.

=== University of Kansas chancellor ===
On May 25, 2017, the Kansas Board of Regents announced Girod as the 18th chancellor of the University of Kansas. During his time as chancellor, Girod has increased the university's enrollment, established a partnership between Kansas Athletics, the University of Kansas Health System and Lawrence Memorial Health to create Kansas Team Health, a model that provides better care for student athletes and moved all healthcare professionals under the Kansas Health System's payroll.

A year into being chancellor, Girod fired athletic director Sheahon Zenger due to a lack of progress in the school's athletic performance. Almost a month later, Girod hired Jeff Long as the new athletics director, tasking him with fixing the football program. Long fired David Beaty at the end of the 2018 football season, ending with a 6–42 record at Kansas. Long then hired Les Miles to improve the football program to a championship-caliber program, however, Miles was fired on March 9, 2021, after accusations from women while he was at LSU. The next day, Girod fired Long as the athletics director.

In April 2021, Girod hired Travis Goff as the new athletics director, whose first task was to hire a new football coach. Almost a month later, Goff named Lance Leipold as the next football coach. Leipold, in just his second season, led the Jayhawks to a 5–0 start for the first time since 2008 and also coached the team to be bowl-eligible for the first time since 2008.

In 2025, Girod was the fourth highest paid employee of the state of Kansas, with a reported salary of $925,000.

== Personal life ==
Girod is married to Susan Pirtle and they have three children. Girod and his wife live in Lawrence, Kansas.
