= VA Southern Nevada Healthcare System =

- United States Department of Veterans Affairs

Geography
- Location: 6900 North Pecos Road; North Las Vegas, Clark County, Nevada, U.S.
- Coordinates: 36°17′07″N 115°05′43″W

Organisation
- Care system: Governmental
- Type: District
- Affiliated university: University of Nevada, Reno School of Medicine (2012–2017); UNLV School of Medicine (2017–present)
- Network: United States Department of Veterans Affairs

Services
- Standards: Joint Commission
- Emergency department: Yes
- Beds: 90

Helipads
- Helipad: Yes

History
- Founded: August 6, 2012; 13 years ago

Links
- Website: http://www.lasvegas.va.gov

VA Southern Nevada Healthcare System is a Veterans Affairs hospital that opened on August 14, 2012, and is located at 6900 North Pecos Road in North Las Vegas, Nevada. This was the first newly constructed VA hospital to open since 1995 and cost $600 million.

The facility will provide 90 beds, a 120-bed nursing home and an outpatient care center. Located on a 151-acre (61 ha) site and will contain over 1,000,000 square feet (93,000 m^{2}) once it's fully functional.

== History ==
The hospital was formally dedicated on August 6, 2012, and services were added over the remainder in 2012 and the facility was able to provide all planned services.

== Access ==
In addition to car and van service, the Regional Transportation Commission offers service on the DVX route from the Bonneville Transit Center.
