= Barbara Bichelmeyer =

American educator, university administrator

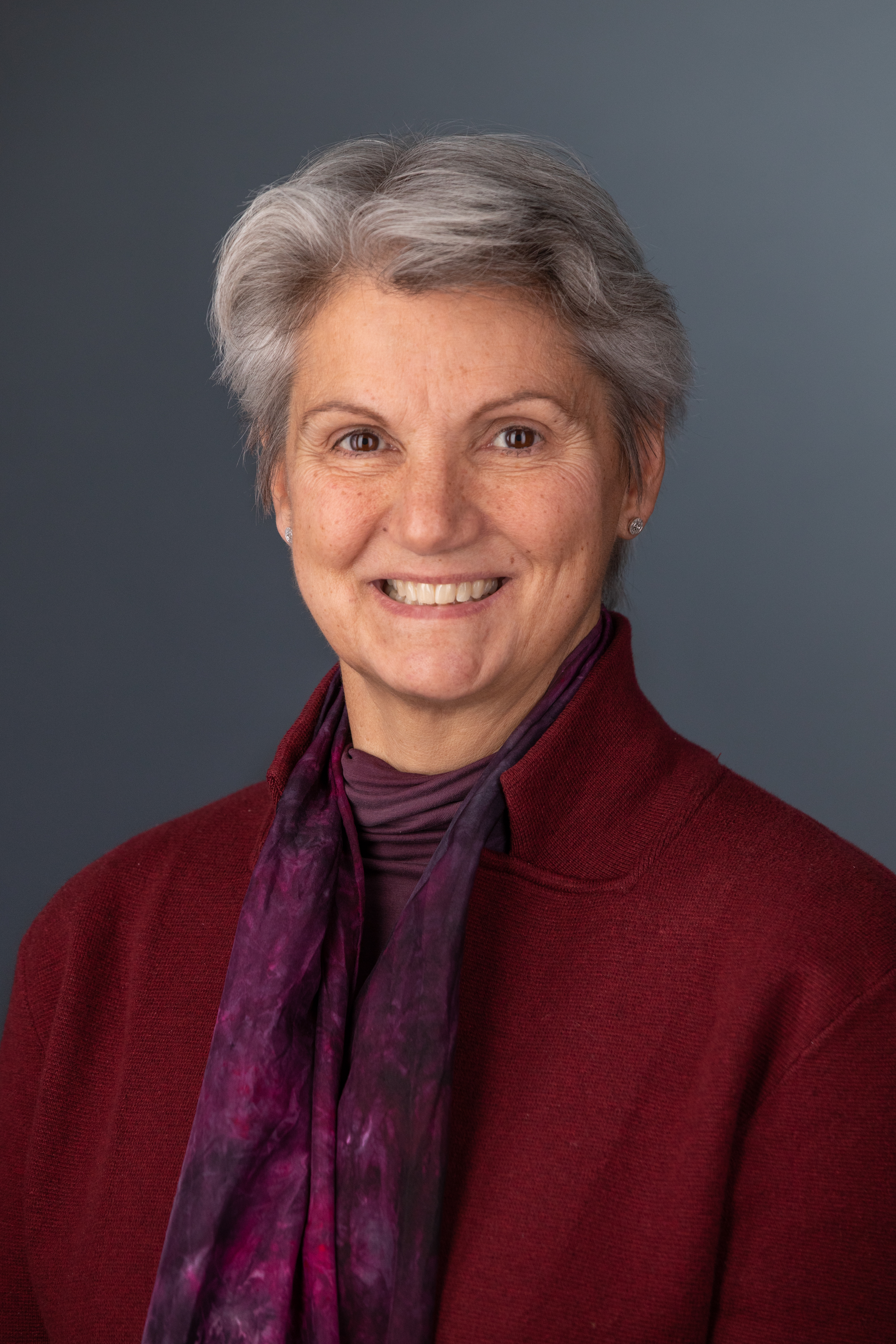

Provost and Executive Vice Chancellor of the University of Kansas
- Incumbent
- Assumed office February 24, 2020
- Chancellor: Doug Girod
- Preceded by: Carl Lejuez

Personal details
- Born: November 3, 1960 (age 65) Kansas City, Missouri, U.S.
- Education: University of Kansas (BS, BA, MS, PhD)
- Website: Office of the Provost

Barbara A. Bichelmeyer (born November 3, 1960) is an American educator, university administrator, and the current provost and executive vice chancellor at the University of Kansas. Most recently she was provost and executive vice chancellor at the University of Missouri–Kansas City, a position she held from July 2015 to January 2020. Prior to serving as the provost and executive vice chancellor at the University of Missouri-Kansas City, Bichelmeyer primarily served as executive associate vice president for university academic affairs and senior director of the Office of Online Education at Indiana University Bloomington.

== Early life and education ==
Born in Kansas City and raised in Shawnee, Kansas, Bichelmeyer attended St. Joseph, Missouri and Shawnee, Kansas elementary and secondary schools. She attended the University of Kansas, where she earned a Bachelor of Science degree in journalism in 1982, a Bachelor of Arts in English in 1986, a Master of Science degree in Educational Policy and Administration in 1988, and a Doctor of Philosophy in Educational Communications and Technology in 1991.

== Career ==
Bichelmeyer's first position as an educator was at Aquinas High School in Shawnee, Kansas, from 1983 to 1986, where she served as a teacher and coach. She transitioned to higher education as a visiting assistant professor at the University of Kansas (School of Education, Department of Curriculum & Instruction) from 1994 to 1996. She then moved to a permanent faculty position at Indiana University Bloomington (School of Education, Department of Instructional Systems Technology) from 1996 to 2017 and joined the faculty at University of Missouri-Kansas City as a professor in the Henry W. Bloch School of Management (Department of Management) in 2015.

Academic administration
Bichelmeyer served as associate dean of the faculties for Indiana University Bloomington from 2007 to 2009, associate vice president for university academic planning and policy from 2009 to 2013, and executive associate vice president for university academic and regional campus affairs from 2014 to 2015. Additionally, Bichelmeyer was appointed interim chancellor at Indiana University Southeast from 2013 to 2014.

Bichelmeyer was the founding director of IU Online (2014–2015) and authored the implementation plans IU Online: Moving Forward (2012) and Moving Forward 2.0: IU Online Implementation Plan (2015). In 2015, Bichelmeyer moved to Kansas City, Missouri, to accept a position as provost at the University of Missouri-Kansas City (UMKC) (2015–2020). While holding her provost position, she served simultaneously as interim chancellor for UMKC from 2017 to 2018.

Professional consulting
Bichelmeyer's professional consulting has included work for Sprint, the National Collegiate Athletic Association, the U.S. Coast Guard, the American Legal Institute – American Bar Association, and the Indiana Supreme Court Commission for Continuing Legal Education.

== Personal life ==
The youngest of 10 children, Bichelmeyer was born into a family with multi-generational roots in Kansas City's meat industry. Her father, John F. Bichelmeyer, founded Bichelmeyer Meats, which continues operation in Kansas City.

In 2013, Bichelmeyer married her partner of nearly 20 years, Emily Raeburn Ward.

== Selected publications ==
- Wisneski, J.E., Ozogul, G. & Bichelmeyer, B.A. (2017), Investigating the impact of learning environments on undergraduate students’ academic performance in a prerequisite and post-requisite course sequence. The Internet and Higher Education, 32, 1-10
- Cakir, H. & Bichelmeyer, B.A. (2016). Effects of teacher professional characteristics on student achievement: an investigation in a blended learning environment with standards-based curriculum. Interactive Learning Environments, 24(1), 20-32
- Bichelmeyer, B.A. (1999). Ten key principles supporting the Accomplishment-Based Curriculum Development Model. Performance Improvement Quarterly, 12(4), 82-98
- Tripp, S.D., & Bichelmeyer, B.A. (1990). Rapid prototyping: An alternative instructional design strategy. Educational Technology Research & Development, 38(1), 31-44

== Awards and honors ==
- Indiana University Bicentennial Medal (2019)
- Kansas City Business Journal, Women Who Mean Business (2019)
- Indiana University Distinguished Service Medal (2015)
- Indiana University Trustees’ Teaching Award (2000/2001; 2004/2005)
