= Robert Simari =

Former executive vice chancellor (born 1960)

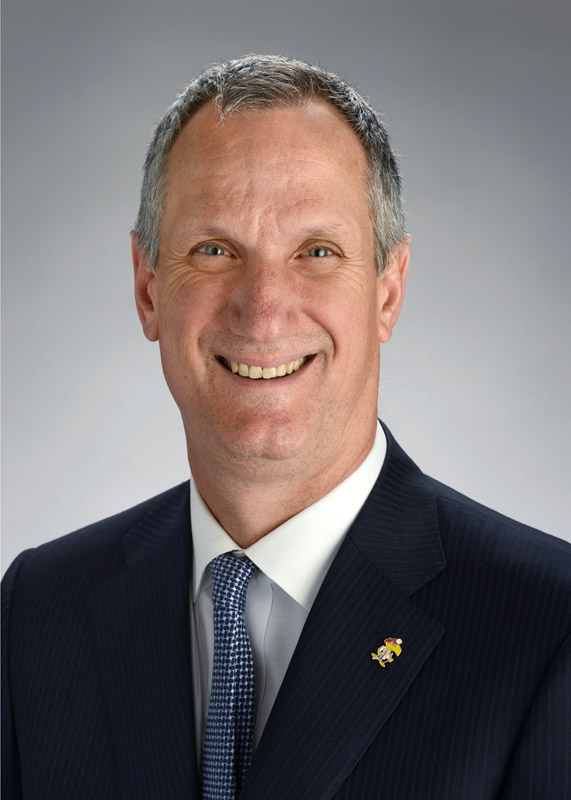
- Simari in 2014

8th Executive Vice Chancellor of the University of Kansas Medical Center
- In office July 1, 2017 – April 19, 2024; Interim: July 1, 2017 – January 9, 2018
- Preceded by: Doug Girod
- Succeeded by: Matthias Salathe (interim)

16th Executive Dean of the University of Kansas School of Medicine
- In office March 24, 2014 – August 25, 2019
- Preceded by: Barbara F. Atkinson
- Succeeded by: Akinlolu Ojo

Personal details
- Born: Robert David Simari; June 6, 1960 (age 66)
- Spouse: Kelly Machi
- Children: 4
- Education: University of Notre Dame (BS); University of Kansas (MD)
- Profession: Medical Doctor; Professor; University Administrator
- Salary: $708,700

Robert David Simari (born June 6, 1960) is a former American educator, physician, and administrator. He was the executive vice chancellor of the University of Kansas Medical Center from 2018 to 2024. Prior to becoming the executive vice chancellor, he was the executive dean of the University of Kansas School of Medicine, a position he held from 2014 to 2019. Prior to returning to his alma mater, Simari served as a professor in cardiology among other roles, at the Mayo Clinic College of Medicine and Science.

== Biography ==
=== Early years ===
Simari moved to Overland Park, Kansas at the age of 10 and graduated from Shawnee Mission West High School. He received his Bachelor of Science from the University of Notre Dame and completed his doctorate from the KU School of Medicine. His residency was at the Beth Israel Deaconess Medical Center and ending with a fellowship at the Mayo Clinic. For a few years, he completed research at the University of Michigan before returning to the Mayo Clinic.

=== University of Kansas Medical Center ===
In March 2014, Simari was named the executive dean for KU's school of medicine. During his time as executive dean, Simari helped create a new curriculum for the school and oversaw the construction of a new education building. In June 2017, Simari was named interim executive vice chancellor for KU Medical Center, and was promoted to the permanent position on January 9, 2018. He continued serving as the school of medicine‘s executive Dean until August 2019 when he hired his successor.

In April 2024, Simari announced his retirement from the University of Kansas. He continued to serve as faculty member until June 30, 2024, and immediately stepped down as executive vice chancellor. During his time as executive vice chancellor, Simari has focused on diversity, equity, and inclusion by creating a new department in 2019. Simari continued to practice cardiology at the University of Kansas Health System until his retirement.
