= UNLV School of Medicine =

Medical school in Las Vegas, Nevada, US

Coordinates: 36.15981°N 115.16886°W

Kirk Kerkorian School of Medicine at UNLV
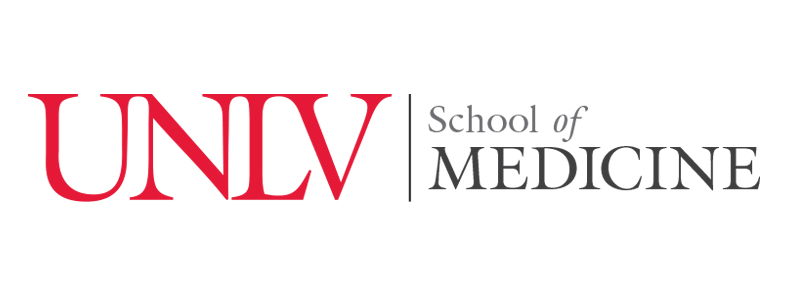
- Type: Public
- Established: August 22, 2014; 12 years ago
- Parent institution: University of Nevada, Las Vegas
- Dean: Marc J. Kahn
- Students: 60
- Location: Las Vegas, Nevada, U.S.
- Website: www.unlv.edu/medicine

Kirk Kerkorian School of Medicine at the University of Nevada, Las Vegas (UNLV), is an academic division of the University of Nevada, Las Vegas (UNLV) with 60 students matriculated on July 17, 2017. The students began their education with a 6 week EMT course. The school is the first to grant the Doctor of Medicine (MD) degree in Southern Nevada. The school uses facilities in the University Medical Center of Southern Nevada (UMCSN) clinical building at the Las Vegas Medical District.

== History ==
Barbara F. Atkinson was hired by UNLV as the Planning Dean on May 19, 2014. The school was officially founded on August 22, 2014 when the Nevada System of Higher Education (NSHE) Board of Regents approved a two year budget, and the school submitted its accreditation application to the LCME on September 29, 2014. A joint legislative budget subcommittee approved an initial $1.2 million for FY2016 and $7.1 million for FY2017 to fund development on May 7, 2015. An additional $5.9 million for FY2016 and $12.5 million for FY2017 were added from the General Fund upon final adoption of SB514 on June 11, 2015. Barbara Atkinson was promoted from Planning Dean to Founding Dean on November 10, 2015. The LCME transitioned the school from applicant to candidate status on February 11, 2016 and the school received preliminary accreditation by the LCME on October 18, 2016. In August 2016, the ACGME approved the transfer to UNLV of all Las Vegas based residencies and fellowships previously associated with the University of Nevada, Reno School of Medicine, effective July 1, 2017. The first White Coat Ceremony was conducted on August 25, 2017.

The Clark County Commission approved a 3 year lease of the University Medical Center of Southern Nevada (UMCSN) clinical building at 1524 Pinto Lane, in the Las Vegas Medical District, on September 10, 2015. The Clark County Commission then approved the transfer of 9 acres of land at 625 Shadow Lane to the school on June 21, 2016, on which the school plans to build a new 170,000 square feet building for about $100 million.

As of July 24, 2019, Atkinson announced she will transition from dean into an advisory leadership role with the school, effective Sept. 1, 2019 citing personal reasons for the change after leading the school during its crucial formative years. In April 2020, Dr. Marc J. Kahn began his tenure as Dean of the School

=== Philanthropy ===
In April 2015, UNLV committed to paying the entire 4-year medical school tuition for its initial class of 60 students. A $10 million donation from the Engelstad Family Foundation announced in June 2015 exceeded this goal, providing 100 students, 25 in each class over the first 4 years, with full tuition.

Anthony Marlon, a Las Vegas cardiologist and founder of Sierra Health Services, donated $2 million in September 2015 to help form the Department of Orthopedic Surgery.

The United Health Foundation donated $3 million in April 2016 to develop community clinics and educational programs.

An anonymous donation of $25 million matched $25 million in new legislative funding, authorized by the Nevada Legislature on June 5, 2017.

== Curriculum ==
UNLV School of Medicine offers medical students a hands-on, community focused curriculum grounded in technology and innovation. Students are immediately immersed into the medical field with the first phase of the curriculum being a four-week course in population health and emergency medical services (EMS).

During the second phase, students will have the opportunity to work in small groups to learn medical Spanish, virtual microscopy and virtual anatomy. Virtual anatomy tables, virtual reality headsets, and human cadavers are used to teach anatomy. Along with UNLV School of Medicine’s virtual anatomy, students benefit from a virtual library. Books, journal articles, videos, and data is available digitally through EZProxy, a cross platform cloud environment which allows students access to the library from anywhere in the world.

Students will receive a full year of outpatient, integrated clerkships. They will work closely with physicians and nurses in the specialties of: Emergency Medicine, Family Medicine, Internal Medicine, Obstetrics and Gynecology, Orthopedic Surgery, Otolaryngology, Pediatrics, Psychiatry, and Surgery. Along with working with healthcare professionals, students will work with UNLV’s William F. Harrah Hotel College of Hotel Administration learning hospitality techniques, offering a new approach to patient care.

In the third phase of the curriculum, students will begin hospital internships, electives and completion of a scholarly project. In an effort to ease the transition into residency, each student will have an intensive capstone rotation individualized to their field of study.

== Affiliated hospitals ==
Hospitals that assist in the instruction of medical students, residents, and fellows from the UNLV School of Medicine include University Medical Center of Southern Nevada, Sunrise Hospital & Medical Center, VA Southern Nevada Healthcare System, and the Mike O'Callaghan Federal Hospital.

== Graduate medical education ==
The residencies and fellowships of the UNLV School of Medicine, as of July 1, 2017:

=== Residencies ===
Program	Length	Accreditation
Emergency Medicine	3 years	ACGME
Family Medicine	3 years	ACGME
Family Medicine-Rural	3 years	ACGME
General Surgery	5 years	ACGME
Internal Medicine	3 years	ACGME
Obstetrics and Gynecology	4 years	ACGME
Orthopedic Surgery	5 years	ACGME
Otolaryngology	5 years	ACGME
Pediatrics	3 years	ACGME
Plastic Surgery	6 years	ACGME
Psychiatry	4 years	ACGME

=== Fellowships ===
Program	Department	Length	Accreditation
Obstetrics	Family Medicine	1 year	—
Sports Medicine	Family Medicine	1 year	ACGME
Urgent Care Fellowship	Family Medicine	1 year	—
Colon and Rectal Surgery	General Surgery	1 year	—
Acute Care Surgery	General Surgery	2 years	ACGME / AAST
Cardiovascular Medicine	Internal Medicine	3 years	ACGME
Gastroenterology and Hepatology	Internal Medicine	3 years	ACGME
Pulmonary and Critical Care Medicine	Internal Medicine	3 years	ACGME
Hand and Microsurgery	Plastic Surgery	1 year	—
Child and Adolescent Psychiatry Fellowship	Psychiatry	2 years	ACGME
Minimally Invasive and Bariatric Surgery	General Surgery	1 year	
