= Kathryn Stephenson =

American physician

- Born: Kathryn Lyle; July 30, 1912; Kansas City, Missouri
- Died: October 18, 1993 (aged 81); Santa Barbara, California
- Citizenship: United States
- Education: Sunset Hill School; University of Arizona; University of Kansas; McGill University
- Known for: First American woman board-certified plastic surgeon
- Scientific career
- Fields: Medicine (plastic surgery)
- Workplaces: Tulane University; Santa Barbara Cottage Hospital

Kathryn Lyle Stephenson (July 30, 1912 – October 18, 1993), was the first American woman to be a board-certified plastic surgeon and the first woman to be editor of the journal Plastic and Reconstructive Surgery. She contributed significantly to the development of plastic surgery between the 1940s and 1980s, and was named the American Association of Plastic Surgeons' 1977 Woman of the Year.

== Biography ==
Stephenson was born Kathryn Lyle in 1912 in Kansas City, Missouri. She grew up in Kansas City, where she graduated from the Sunset Hill School in 1930. After briefly attending the University of Nebraska, she received her bachelor's degree from the University of Arizona in 1936. She was active in the Pi Beta Phi sorority at both schools. After college, she enrolled at the University of Kansas School of Medicine, where she received her M.D. in 1941.

Stephenson interned at the Santa Barbara Cottage Hospital in 1942-43, after which she was an assistant resident at the Royal Victoria Hospital at McGill University in Montreal, and then a resident in pediatrics at the University of Kansas. At Kansas, she began her work in plastic surgery as the Earl C. Padgett Research Fellow in Plastic Surgery in 1944. In 1947, she was appointed an instructor in Plastic Surgery at Tulane University School of Medicine.

In 1949, Stephenson moved back to Santa Barbara and established a private practice; she remained there for the rest of her career. While in private practice in Santa Barbara, she also was on the staff of the Santa Barbara Cottage Hospital, the Santa Barbara General Hospital, and St. Francis Hospital.

The American Board of Plastic Surgery certified Stephenson in 1950, the first woman to achieve this certification, and in 1951 she became the first woman to join the American Association of Plastic Surgeons (in 2013 called the American Academy of Facial Plastic and Reconstructive Surgery). She was a member of the board of directors of the Plastic Surgery Educational Foundation from 1961–63 and was a founding member of the California Society of Plastic Surgeons, of which she was president from 1967-68. She also was a fellow of the American College of Surgeons.

During her career, Stephenson authored dozens of articles and lectures on a wide range of plastic and reconstructive surgery subjects, including aesthetic plastic surgery, burns, mammoplasty, rhytidectomy, and the history of plastic surgery. She co-authored a medical textbook, "Plastic and Reconstructive Surgery," in 1948, and was co-editor and then editor of the journal Plastic and Reconstructive Surgery from 1963–67, the first woman to do so. From 1967-75, she also was co-editor and then editor of the Plastic and Reconstructive Surgery Yearbook.

Stephenson died in Santa Barbara in 1993. Before her death, she donated her papers to the National Archives of Plastic Surgery in the Francis A. Countway Library of Medicine, which became the Boston Medical Library, where they remain collected today as the Kathryn Lyle Stephenson Papers, which Harvard University describes as "recording the development of the speciality" of plastic surgery "in the United States from the mid-1940s to the 1980s."
