= Shea Gordon (artist) =

American artist (born 1946)

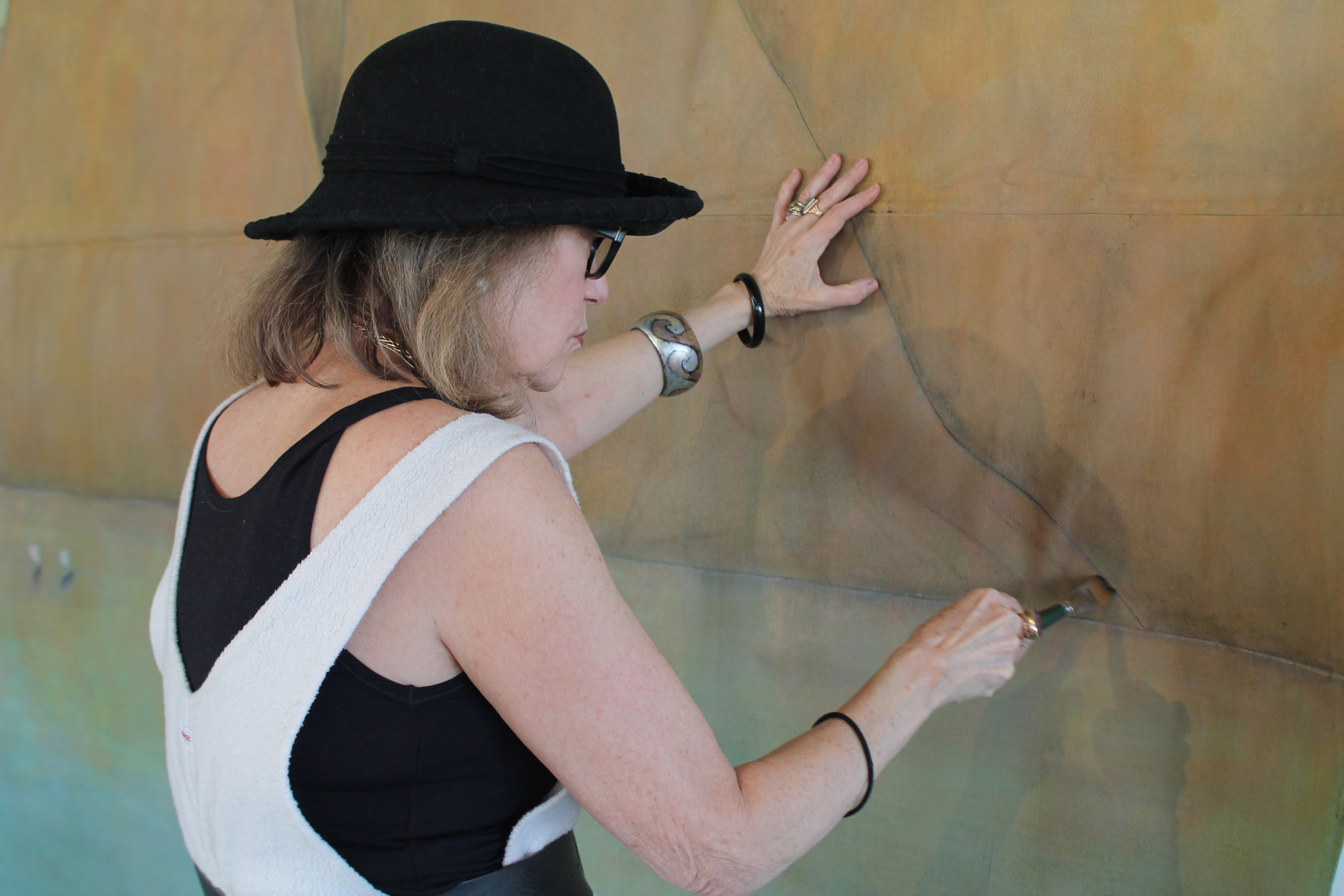
- Artist Shea Gordon
- Born: Shea Gordon; February 22, 1946 (age 80)
- Occupation: Artist
- Website: www.sheagordon.com

Shea Gordon (born February 22, 1946, in Miami, FL) is an American artist whose work focuses on ecofeminism, symbolism, synchronicity, and spirituality. Her work has been exhibited nationally in New York City, Washington, DC, Miami, FL, Kansas City, MO, and internationally in England, Paris, South America, Israel, Australia and New Zealand. Gordon's work is in the permanent collections of Exeter Press, NY, The Nelson-Atkins Museum of Art, The Museum of Modern Art, Buenos Aires, Argentina, Milwaukee Museum of Art and the Nerman Museum of Contemporary Art.

== Early life and career ==
Born in 1946, Shea Gordon was the third of four girls. Her father was the mayor of Dade County in Miami, Florida. Her mother's ecological and feminist concerns influenced Gordon from an early age.

Shea Gordon studied Art at the University of Miami in 1964, and Finch College in New York City in 1965. After graduating, she became the studio assistant for Greek artist, Takis Vassilakis in his studio in the Chelsea Hotel in 1967. In 1971, Gordon relocated to Washington, D.C., where she became the assistant director to conceptual gallerist Max Protech. In 1976 Gordon moved to Kansas City, MO. where she began incorporating numerical systems, notions of synchronicity and coincidence as well as Jungian archetypal symbolism into her work. Shea is married to neurology doctor and researcher Barry Festoff.

== Major projects ==
Gordon lives and works in Kansas City, Missouri, while traveling, performing and exhibiting her work around the world. Her processes include drawing, painting, sculpture, books, performance art, sound art and digital imaging. She works from her studio in the Crossroads Arts District in downtown Kansas City. Her art career spans nearly 50 years.

=== Artist Books and Musical Scores (1972–1991) ===
Gordon's earliest books recorded her work with numerical interpretations such as "The Numerical Interpretation of the Declaration of Independence," and "The Numerical Interpretation of Some Highways in the United States," both from 1977. These books were hand-crafted using mixed-media.

In 1986 Gordon began creating experiential sound art by translating the Declaration of Independence, the United States Constitution and other documents into a numerical system. Later she worked in collaboration with Dr. James Mobberley and Joel Boyer at the Conservatory of Music, University of Missouri-Kansas City, Kansas City, MO, turning the numbers into digital musical scores.

=== The Dead Sea Projects (1982–present) ===
Gordon is best known for her Dead Sea Projects. She has taken the embryonic shape of the landlocked body of salt water located at the birthplace of the Judaeo, Christian and Islamic tradition, as a feminist archetype manifesting itself in paintings, drawings, sculptures, performance and sound art, and jewelry. For Gordon, the Dead Sea is a symbol of birth, death and regeneration.

== Personal life ==
Gorden married neuroscientist Barry Festoff and has one daughter.

== Selected solo exhibitions ==
- 2014 – "Under the Influence: The Work of Shea Gordon, 1967–2014," Heidmann Art Salon, Kansas City, MO
- 2004 – "Floating the Gold Standard," St. Anne's College, Oxford University, Oxford, England, Curated by Dr. Alison Denham
- 1989 – "The Dead Sea: A Theory of Everything," University of Missouri-Kansas City Art Gallery, Kansas City, MO, Curated by Craig Subler
- 1983 – "Walking the Line: Seed Tapes = Pierced Tapes," Paintings, Drawings, Books, Douglas Drake Gallery, Kansas City, MO
- 1977 – Artist Books "Synchronicities: Numerological Portraits," Franklin Furnace, New York, NY
