= Del Shankel =

American microbiologist and academic administrator

Interim Chancellor of the University of Kansas
- In office 1994–1995
- Preceded by: Gene Budig
- Succeeded by: Robert Hemenway
- In office 1980–1981
- Preceded by: Archie Dykes
- Succeeded by: Gene Budig

Personal details
- Born: August 4, 1927 Plainview, Nebraska, U.S.
- Died: July 12, 2018 (aged 90) Lawrence, Kansas
- Spouse: Carol Shankel
- Children: 3
- Education: Walla Walla College; University of Texas

Delbert Merrill Shankel (August 4, 1927 – July 12, 2018) was an American microbiologist and academic administrator. He served as the interim chancellor of the University of Kansas in 1994. Shankel, a microbiologist, was educated at Walla Walla College and University of Texas (PhD in Bacteriology and Biochemistry, 1959). He started teaching at the University of Kansas' Department of Microbiology in 1959. He retired in 1996 and was named professor and chancellor emeritus

Shankel died on July 12, 2018.
