= University of Kansas Health System =

Research hospital in Kansas City, Kansas, U.S.

The University of Kansas Health System

Geography
- Location: Kansas City, Kansas, U.S.
- Coordinates: 39°03′21″N 94°36′33″W

Organisation
- Type: Teaching
- Affiliated university: University of Kansas Medical Center

Services
- Emergency department: Level I Trauma Center
- Beds: 910

Helipads
- Helipad: FAA LID: 10KS
Number	Length		Surface
Number	ft	m	Surface
1

History
- Former name: University of Kansas Hospital
- Founded: 1906

Links
- Website: www.kansashealthsystem.com
- Lists: Hospitals in U.S.

The University of Kansas Health System, commonly known as KU Med and formerly known as The University of Kansas Hospital, is a nonprofit, academic medical center located in Kansas City, Kansas, United States, with branch hospitals and education centers in Topeka, Great Bend, and Olathe, Kansas. It is a Level I Trauma Center. In 1998, it became an independent entity that receives no funding from the state of Kansas. The health system is affiliated with the University of Kansas Medical Center, which comprises the schools of medicine, nursing and allied health. The University of Kansas Health System combines education, research and patient care with over 18,000 employees and 140 locations. Physicians represent more than 200 specialties.

The center has 993 staffed beds; there were 1,753,607 outpatient visits, 62,579 inpatient admissions and 133,093 emergency department visits in 2024. The center performs annually 10,124 inpatient and 8,743 outpatient surgeries.

== History ==
Originally a part of the University of Kansas, the School of Medicine in Lawrence began as a one-year premedical course in 1880 and then offered a two-year course in 1899. It became a four-year school on April 21, 1905, when three private medical schools in the Kansas City area merged: the College of Physicians and Surgeons, the Kansas City Medical College and the Medico-Chirurgical College.

In 1906, Dr. Simeon Bishop Bell donated the land and cash totaling more than $100,000 to establish the original Eleanor Taylor Bell Hospital, in honor of his wife. That same year, the School of Medicine moved into the hospital, located on "Goat Hill" in Rosedale, at what is now Southwest Boulevard and 7th Street, in Kansas City, Kansas. Basic sciences were still taught in Lawrence, while clinical studies were taught at the Rosedale facility. A School of Nursing was also established in 1906.

In the early 1920s, the medical school moved south to its present location at 39th Ave and Rainbow Boulevard, and in the late 1940s, it was renamed the University of Kansas Medical Center. During the 1960s and 1970s, all studies moved to Kansas City, the School of Allied Health was established, and a new hospital officially opened in 1979.

The hospital marked an important milestone in 1998 when it became an independent hospital authority, receiving no state funding and no longer part of The University of Kansas School of Medicine. The hospital's official name became The University of Kansas Hospital. The University of Kansas Hospital joined with the University of Kansas Physicians in 2017 to form The University of Kansas Health System.

A sixth-floor was added to the hospital in 2003 to meet a growing demand for patient services. An expanded and renovated Cancer Center and new Breast Center, both featuring the latest technology and many patient amenities, opened that same year. Also in 2003, construction began on the Center for Advanced Heart Care, an expertly designed cardiac complex focused on serving the needs of patients and families, from curbside to bedside.

The University of Kansas Health System is the official healthcare provider of the Kansas City Current, Kansas City Chiefs and the Kansas City Royals.

== Awards ==
- 2006, 2011, 2016, 2021 — American Nurses Credentialing Center awarded Magnet designation to the hospital, the first in Kansas to attain this status.
- 2007 — U.S. Department of HHS awarded the hospital and its partner, Midwest Transplant Network, a third consecutive Medal of Honor for organ donations
- 2012–2026 — Since the award's inception, The University of Kansas Hospital has been ranked the best hospital in Kansas and in Kansas City by U.S. News & World Report's America's Best Hospitals.
- 2017–2018 — U.S. News & World Report's America's Best Hospitals ranked the hospital in the top 50 in 8 major specialties, including Cancer, Cardiology and Heart Surgery and Neurology and Neurosurgery.
- 2018 — Modern Healthcare named the hospital among the Best Places to Work in Healthcare
- 2018 — American Hospital Association's Hospitals & Health Networks magazine ranked the hospital among the nation's 100 Most Wired hospitals
- 2018 – AHIMA Grace Award Honorable Mention for leveraging analytics to improve clinical documentation and patient care

== Cancer care ==
The University of Kansas Cancer Center earned the Outstanding Achievement Award for exceptional quality from the American College of Surgeons Commission on Cancer in 2007. The outpatient Richard and Annette Bloch Cancer Care Pavilion is designed to provide advanced medical care. The University of Kansas Cancer Center was awarded National Cancer Institute designation as a Comprehensive Cancer Center on July 12, 2012.

== Organ transplantation ==
Hospital transplant teams have developed innovative techniques that minimize transplant trauma and prevent organ rejection. The hospital has one of the highest survival rates – and one of the shortest waiting lists – in the country for heart, kidney, liver and pancreas transplant.

In 2021, The University of Kansas Health System organ transplant team reached an impressive benchmark of 5,000 organs transplanted.

== Deep brain stimulation surgery ==
The University of Kansas Hospital and Medical Center were among the primary testing centers for using DBS to treat Parkinson's disease and essential tremor.

== Branch hospitals ==
=== Great Bend Regional Hospital ===
Great Bend Regional Hospital
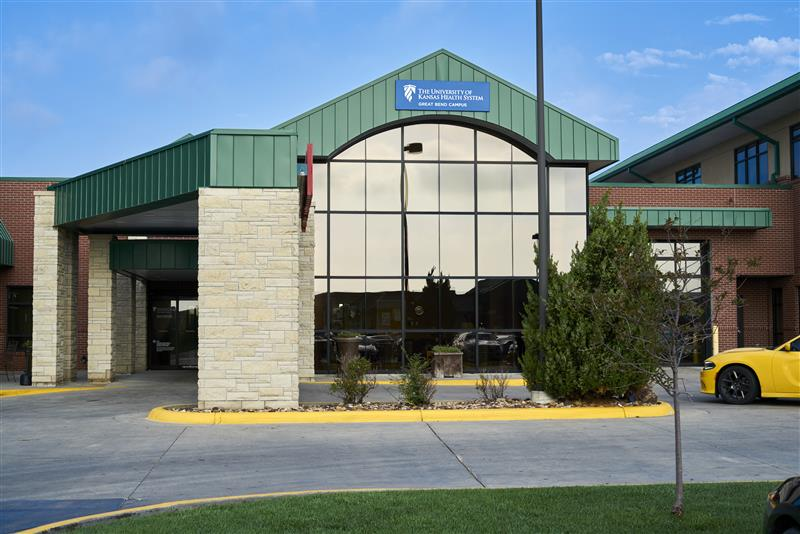

Geography
- Location: Great Bend, Kansas, U.S.
- Coordinates: 38.3566°N 98.7908°W

Organisation
- Affiliated university: The University of Kansas

Services
- Emergency department: Level IV Trauma Center
- Beds: 33

History
- Former name: Great Bend Regional Hospital

Links
- Website: https://www.gbregional.com/
- Lists: Hospitals in U.S.

The University of Kansas Health System Great Bend Campus, located at 514 Cleveland Street in Great Bend, Kansas, is a not-for-profit hospital with a Level IV trauma center.

The campus provides orthopedic, imaging and rehabilitation services, as well as surgical services. In 2025, the 33-bed hospital reported 1,102 admissions and 3,778 patients.
