= Archie Dykes =

American academic

Chancellor of the University of Kansas
- In office 1973–1981
- Preceded by: Raymond Nichols
- Succeeded by: Gene Budig

Personal details
- Born: January 20, 1931 (age 95) Rogersville, Tennessee, U.S.
- Spouse: Nancy Jane Haun
- Children: 2

Archie Reece Dykes (born January 20, 1931) is an American academic. He served as the chancellor of the University of Kansas from 1973 to 1981. From 1967 to 1971, he was chancellor of the University of Tennessee at Martin. Dykes is an alumnus of East Tennessee State University and University of Tennessee at Knoxville and holds bachelor's, master's, and doctorate degrees in education.
