= Gene Budig =

American baseball executive (1939–2020)

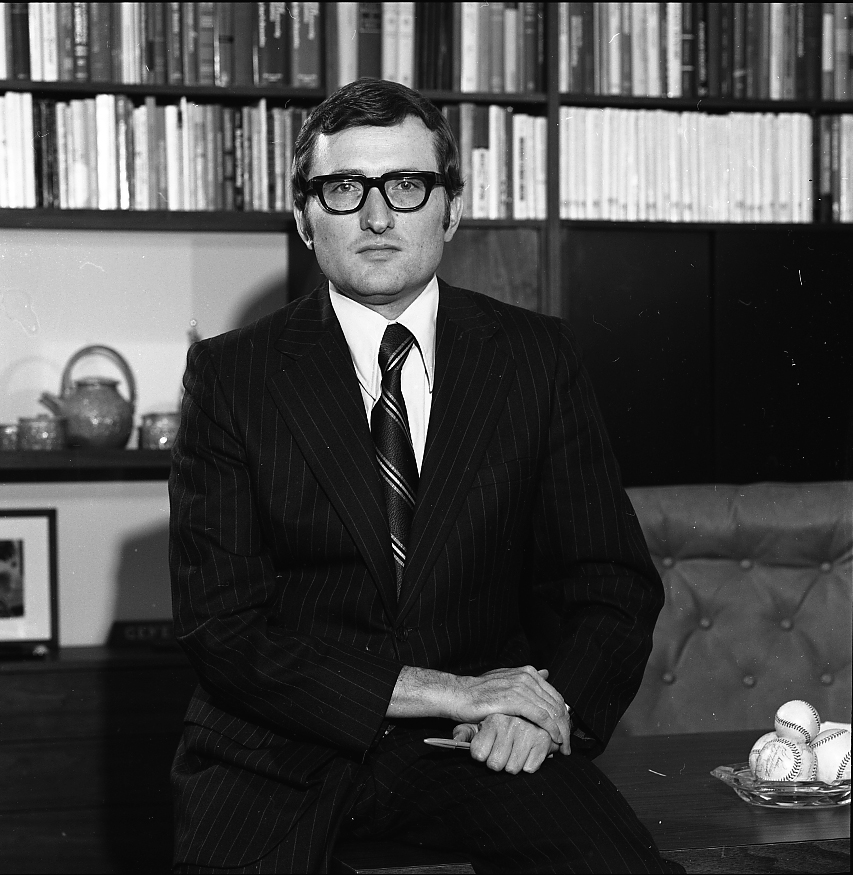
- Gene Budig, in his office at Illinois State University, 1973.

President of Illinois State University
- In office 1973–1977
- Preceded by: David K. Berlo
- Succeeded by: Lloyd Watkins

President of West Virginia University
- In office 1977–1981
- Preceded by: James Gindling Harlow
- Succeeded by: Harry Bruce Heflin

Chancellor of the University of Kansas
- In office 1981–1994
- Preceded by: Archie Dykes
- Succeeded by: Del Shankel

President of American League of Professional Baseball Clubs
- In office 1994–1999
- Preceded by: Bobby Brown
- Succeeded by: Office abolished

Personal details
- Born: May 25, 1939 McCook, Nebraska, U.S.
- Died: September 8, 2020 (aged 81) Charleston, South Carolina, U.S.
- Education: University of Nebraska

Gene Arthur Budig (May 25, 1939 – September 8, 2020) was an American baseball executive and academic administrator. He was the last president of the American League (AL), serving from 1994 to 1999. After his tenure concluded, the presidencies of the American League and the National League (NL) were eliminated by Major League Baseball (MLB). Budig went on to become part-owner of a minor league baseball team, a position he held until his death.

Prior to baseball, Budig was a chancellor at the University of Kansas and president at Illinois State University and West Virginia University.

== Early life ==
Gene Arthur Budig was born on May 25, 1939, and was placed in an orphanage and adopted shortly thereafter. He was raised in McCook, Nebraska; his childhood goal was to become second baseman for the New York Yankees. He attended the University of Nebraska, where he earned a bachelor's degree in journalism in 1962. He subsequently undertook postgraduate studies at that same institution, obtaining a master's degree in English one year later and a Doctor of Philosophy in education in 1967. He went on to serve as president of Illinois State University from 1973 to 1977 and of West Virginia University from 1977 to 1981. He was also chancellor of the University of Kansas from 1981 until 1994. A lecture hall at KU, Budig Hall, was named in his honor. Active in the Air National Guard, Budig retired at the rank of major general in 1992.

=== Tenure at Illinois State University ===
Prior to becoming president of Illinois State University, Budig served as its dean of students for seventeen months. One of Budig's first actions was to restore the academic colleges and Student Services eliminated by the prior president, David Berlo. Under Budig, several new degrees were added at the bachelor's, master's, and doctoral levels, ranging from agribusiness to curriculum and instruction.

During Budig's presidency, Illinois State ended its prohibition and lowered the legal drinking age to nineteen, leading to a drinking and drugs problem at the university that would cause some conflict and protest from the students. Also during his presidency, Budig had to contend with the "Rites of Spring". In 1977, a rock concert on campus saw thousands of dollars in property damage and dozens of students requiring medical attention, some for drug overdoses.

=== Tenure at the University of Kansas ===
Gene Budig served as KU's fourteenth Chancellor from 1981 to 1994. During Budig's tenure, the university experienced impressive growth of the physical campus in Lawrence and elsewhere with numerous projects, including construction of the Dole Human Development Center, the Adams Alumni Center, the Anschutz Science Library, the Lied Center, and the Regents Center in Overland Park (now known as the Edwards Campus).

The university also achieved impressive growth in enrollment and endowed professorships. In 1992, KU set a record with an enrollment of 29,161 students, and endowed professorships more than tripled, from just 44 at his arrival to more than 130 at his retirement. In 1991, Hoch Auditorium was struck by lightning and burned to the ground. Through Chancellor Budig's efforts, KU received an $18 million State appropriation to rebuild the structure. In recognition, the new building was named Budig Hall when it was officially dedicated in 1997.

== Baseball ==
Budig was named president of the American League on June 8, 1994. He served in that role for six seasons, before the position was officially abolished. From 1992 through 1998, the office of Commissioner of Baseball was officially vacant, with Bud Selig exercising the Commissioner's power as Chairman of the Executive Council, therefore during those years the league president of the winning team presented the Commissioner's Trophy. Budig presented New York Yankees owner George Steinbrenner with the Commissioner's Trophy after the Yankees won the first World Series to be telecast by Fox in 1996, 4 games to 2. The trophy presentation was made in the Yankees' locker room at Yankee Stadium following Game 6. He also presented the trophy to the Yankees following their victories in 1998 and 1999.

During Budig's tenure as president, he brought in Larry Doby – the AL's first African-American player – to be his special assistant in 1995, observing how "few have done more for Major League Baseball than Larry Doby." He also handed down a suspension to Mike Stanton for the latter's role in a bench-clearing brawl between the Yankees and Baltimore Orioles in 1998. The move infuriated Steinbrenner, who said about Budig, "I’m not sure when the last time he wore a jockstrap was". Budig declined to counter Steinbrenner publicly; instead, he arranged for his friends at the University of Kansas' athletic department to send him the largest jockstrap they had, which he duly autographed and dispatched to Steinbrenner. The position of President of the American League was abolished when Commissioner Bud Selig restructured Major League Baseball and eliminated the offices of American and National League president.

In January 2007, Budig became part-owner of the Charleston RiverDogs, a minor-league affiliate of the New York Yankees who play in the South Atlantic League.

== Death ==
Budig died on September 8, 2020. He was 81 and in hospice care at his home in Charleston, South Carolina in the time leading up to his death.

Academic offices
Preceded by David K. Berlo	President of Illinois State University; 1973–1977	Succeeded by Lloyd Watkins
Preceded by James Gindling Harlow	President of West Virginia University; 1977–1981	Succeeded by Harry Bruce Heflin
Preceded by Archie Dykes	President of University of Kansas; 1981–1994	Succeeded by Del Shankel
