= James Marvin (academic) =

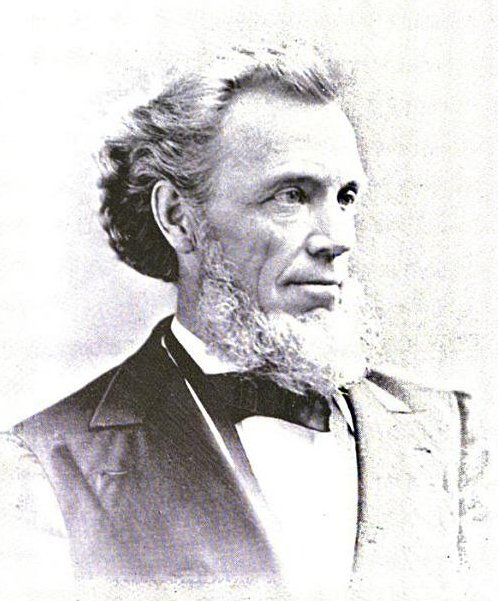
James Marvin

James Marvin (17 August 1820 – 1901) was the third Chancellor of the University of Kansas from 1874 to 1883.

Marvin was born in Peru, Clinton County, New York. He studied at Allegheny College graduating in 1849. He taught there and at Alfred Teachers' Seminary. Marvin and his wife Armina were the parents of two children.
