= Robert W. Oliver =

US academic (1815-1899)

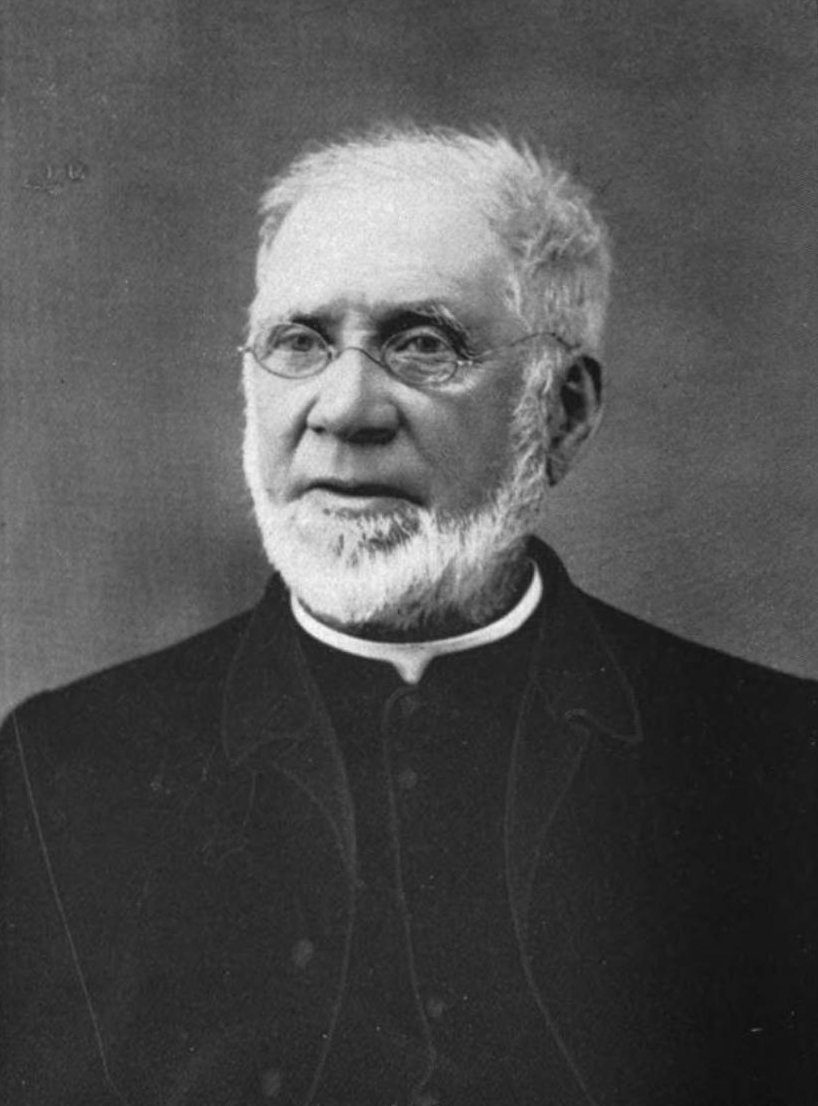
Rev. R. W. Oliver

Rev. Robert W. Oliver (1815–1899) was the first Chancellor of the University of Kansas from 1865 to 1867.

In November 1863, the Rev. Robert W. Oliver, rector of the Trinity Episcopal Church, met with church leaders to review the status of plans for establishing a university in Lawrence. He led the building of North College Hall, which opened to 55 students on September 16, 1866.
