= Robert Hemenway =

American university administrator

Chancellor of the University of Kansas
- In office 1995 – 2009
- Preceded by: Del Shankel
- Succeeded by: Bernadette Gray-Little

Personal details
- Born: August 10, 1941 Nebraska, United States
- Died: July 31, 2015 (aged 73) Lenexa, Kansas
- Spouse: Leah Hattemer (m. 1981–2015)
- Children: 8
- Education: University of Nebraska Omaha; Kent State University

Robert Emery Hemenway (August 10, 1941 – July 31, 2015) was the 16th chancellor of the University of Kansas (KU).

== Biography ==
Hemenway was born on August 10, 1941, in Nebraska. He served as Dean of Arts and Sciences at the University of Oklahoma from 1986 to 1989, and chancellor of the University of Kentucky from 1989 to 1995. He arrived at KU in 1995 as the successor to interim chancellor Del Shankel.

Hemenway also served as Chair of the 18-member NCAA Division I board of directors from 2002 to 2005, and as a member of the board of directors of the American Council on Education. Starting in 2002, he served on the board of directors of the National Association of State Universities and Land Grant Colleges.

Upon his arrival at KU, Hemenway prioritized making it a Top 25 academic institution in America. In 2007, KU ranked 88th according to the U.S. News & World Report ranking of all national universities (public and private). In 1988, during Hemenway's tenure, KU ranked as high as 30th in that ranking, and was 45th in 2005. KU ranks 3rd among public colleges and universities for the number of Academic All-Americans since 1990. Hemenway also made research a pillar of KU, especially in medical fields, and, in 2006, made a commitment to cancer research through the designation of the KU Cancer Center.

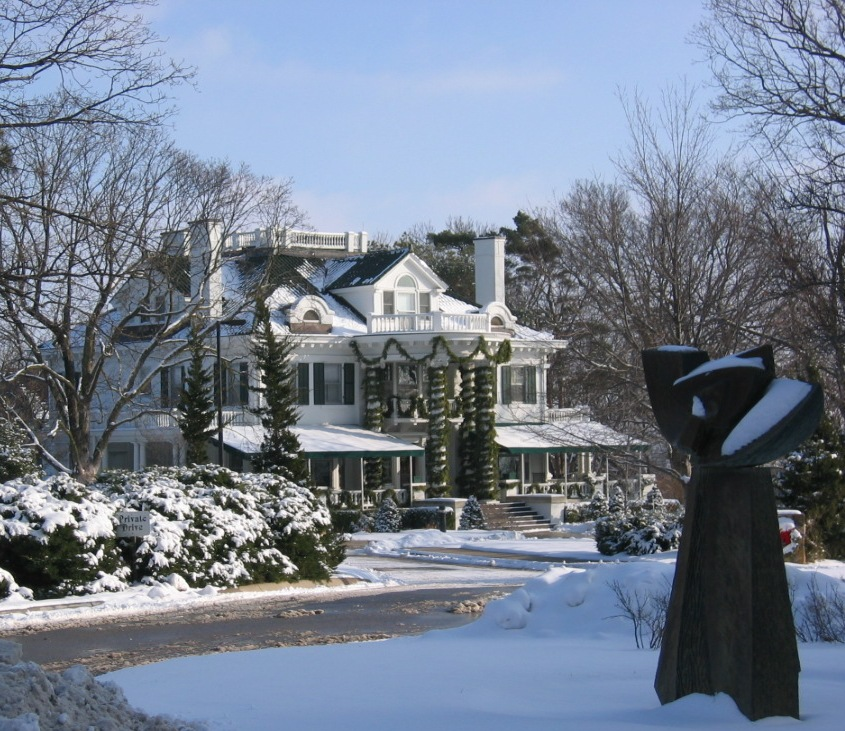
Chancellor's Residence, the University of Kansas, Lawrence, Kansas

On December 8, 2008, Hemenway announced that he would step down as chancellor on June 30, 2009, after serving 14 years in the position. He announced that he would be transitioning to the role of faculty member after taking a sabbatical during the 2009–10 academic year, to write a book on intercollegiate athletics and American values. Hemenway was replaced by Bernadette Gray-Little.

Hemenway died on July 31, 2015, from complications of Parkinson's disease.

== Education ==
- Hastings (Neb.) High School (1959)
- University of Nebraska at Omaha (1963), B.A. with Honors, English
- Kent State University (1966) Ph.D., English.

== Teaching and scholarship ==
- Authored "Zora Neale Hurston: A Literary Biography", about the Harlem Renaissance author, which was named one of the New York Times' Best Books of 1978.
- In addition to serving as chancellor, Hemenway taught English.
- Professor of English at the University of Kentucky and the University of Wyoming

== Trivia ==
- Nicknames: Chancellor Bob (referred to himself as this at 2006 commencement); Uncle Bob (sometimes used by students)
- Married Leah Renee Hattemer on December 19, 1981.
