= Bernadette Gray-Little =

American academic administrator

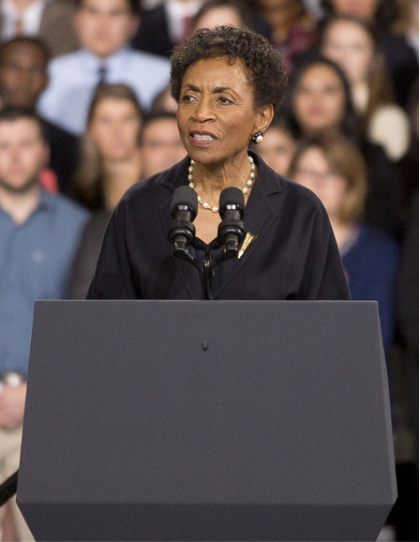
- Gray-Little on January 22, 2015 addresses the crowd before former President Obama speaks.

17th Chancellor of University of Kansas
- In office August 15, 2009 – June 30, 2017
- Preceded by: Robert Hemenway
- Succeeded by: Douglas Girod

Executive Vice Chancellor and Provost University of North Carolina at Chapel Hill
- In office July 1, 2006 – July 31, 2009

Personal details
- Born: October 21, 1944 (age 81) Washington, North Carolina
- Education: Marywood University (BS); Saint Louis University (MS and PhD)
- Profession: Educator
- Salary: $511,341

Bernadette Gray-Little is a retired academic administrator most recently serving as the 17th chancellor of the University of Kansas, where she was the first African-American and female to serve as the chancellor. She oversaw the university's main campus in Lawrence, its medical center campuses in Kansas City, Salina and Wichita, the Edwards Campus in Overland Park, and other facilities around Kansas. She replaced chancellor Robert Hemenway in August 2009, and retired in June 2017.

== Background ==
Bernadette Gray-Little was born Bernadette Gray in Washington, North Carolina on October 21, 1944. She received her B.A. from Marywood University in (Scranton, PA) and an M.S. and PhD in psychology from Saint Louis University. As part of a Fulbright Foundation fellowship, she conducted postdoctoral research in cross-cultural psychology in Denmark. She has also been a Social Science Research Council Fellow and a recipient of a Ford Foundation Senior Scholar Fellowship through the National Research Council.

== Employment history ==
University of North Carolina at Chapel Hill

- 1971–1976, Assistant Director and Supervisor, Family Practice Center
- 1971–1982, Professor, Assistant to Full, Psychology
- 1983–1993, Director, Graduate Program in Clinical Psychology
- 1993–1998, Chair, Department of Psychology
- 1999–2001, Senior Associate Dean – Undergraduate Education
- 2001–2004, Executive Associate Provost
- 2004–2006, Dean, College of Arts and Sciences
- 2006–2009, Executive Vice Chancellor and Provost

University of Kansas

- 2009–2017, Chancellor

== Boards and committees ==
Gray-Little was one of four university leaders selected to represent the Association of Public and Land-grant Universities at a White House summit on math and science education in January 2010. She has held a number of leadership positions and memberships on a variety of boards and committees, including several with the American Psychological Association. She also served as a faculty affiliate at the Center for Creative leadership from 1998 to 2004. She currently serves on the board of trustees of the Online Computer Library Center and the board of US Bank.

On September 22, 2016, Gray-Little announced she would retire at the end of the 2016–17 school year.
