= University of Kansas Medical Center =

Medical campus in Kansas City, Kansas, U.S.

The University of Kansas Medical Center
- Type: Public university
- Established: June 21, 1920
- Parent institution: University of Kansas
- Chancellor: Doug Girod
- Executive Vice Chancellor: Steve Stites
- Academic staff: 1,785 (Fall 2023)
- Administrative staff: 2,432 (Fall 2023)
- Students: 3,886 (Fall 2023)
- Location: Kansas City, Kansas, U.S. 39°3′26″N 94°36′38″W
- Campus: Urban, 41 acres (17 ha)
- Colors: Crimson and blue
- Mascots: Jayhawk, JayDoc
- Website: www.kumc.edu

The University of Kansas Medical Center, commonly referred to as KU Med or KUMC, is a medical campus for the University of Kansas. KU Med houses the university's schools of medicine, nursing, and health professions, with the primary health science campus in Kansas City, Kansas, United States. Other campuses are located in Wichita and Salina, Kansas, and is connected with The University of Kansas Health System.

KU Med has its own police force, the University of Kansas Medical Center Police Department. The police force is accredited by the Commission on Accreditation for Law Enforcement Agencies.

== History ==
The School of Medicine was formed in 1905, with several Kansas City hospitals being combined within the next ten years. In 1947, the campus was renamed to the University of Kansas Medical Center. The campus began expanding its programs over the next forty years, and on February 27, 1990, the hospital performed its first liver transplant.

In 1997, the state of Kansas was struggling to keep the hospital and its medical campus open so the state legislature passed a bill to sell the hospital, and keep the medical campus for schooling.

Since the state separated with the hospital, the Medical Center has turned its focus on cancer. In 2002, the University of Kansas Cancer Center was established, with the help of the Kansas masons. It became a National Cancer Institute-designated in 2012 and became a designated "comprehensive cancer center" in 2022.

== Academics ==
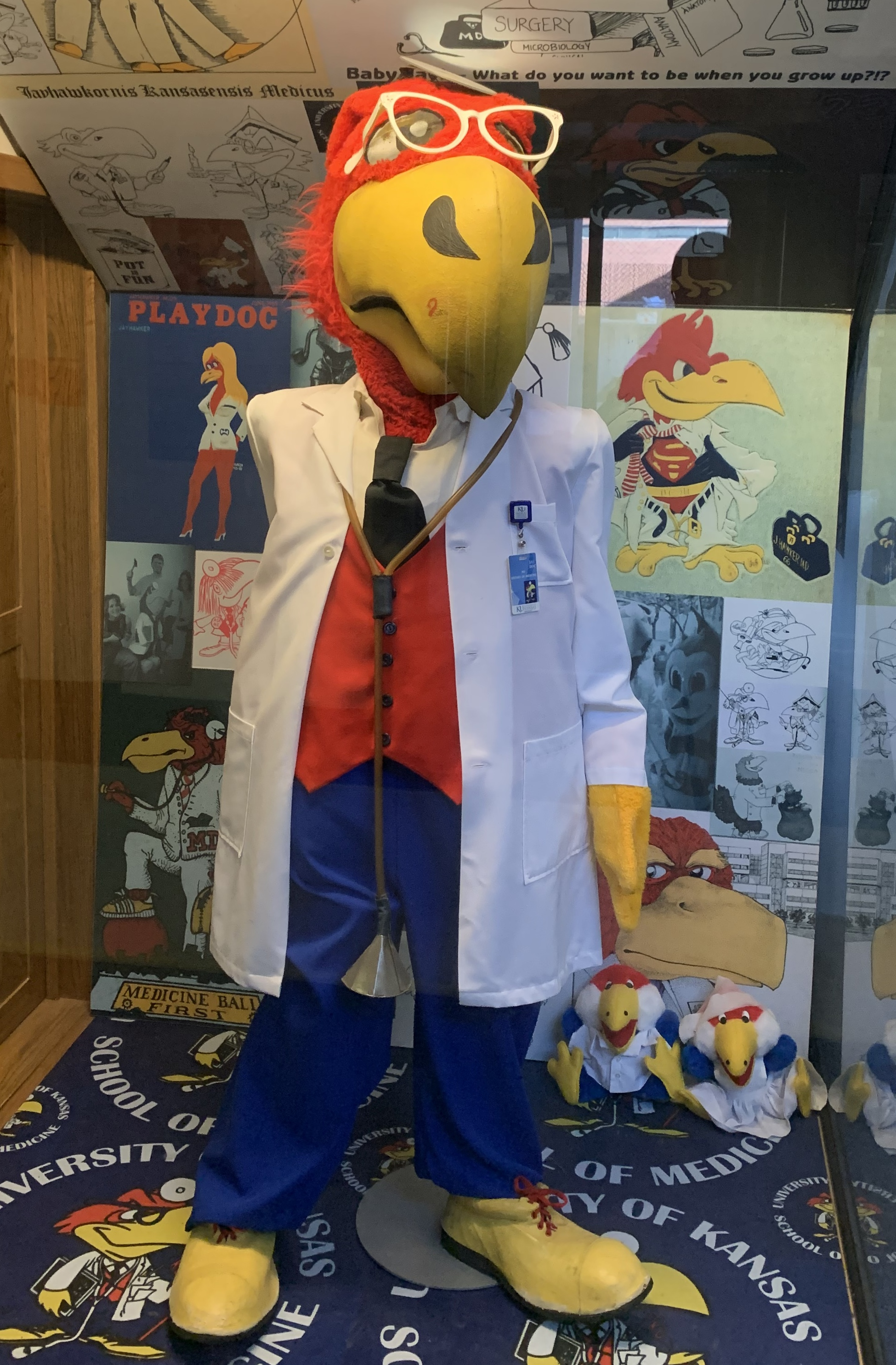
JayDoc, KU Medical Center's mascot

KU Med teaches its courses in both academic buildings, as well as the hospital. KU Med consists of three schools: the School of Medicine, the School of Nursing, and the School of Health Professions. With three campuses spread out in Kansas, the Medical Center employs 5,460 people, with 1,691 of those being teaching faculty. As of fall 2023, the KU Medical Center has 3,886 students enrolled.

As of August 2024, the executive vice chancellor is Steven Stites.

=== School of Medicine ===
The School of Medicine, which officially began in 1905 by the Kansas Board of Regents in Kansas City, was the only medical school in Kansas until 2022. The school offers seven different degree programs, with the only options as master's program or a doctoral program. The other two campuses are in Wichita, which opened in 1971, and Salina, which opened in 2011.

=== School of Nursing ===
The School of Nursing began in 1906. It offers a Bachelor of Science in Nursing (BSN), doctoral degrees (including Doctor of Nursing Practice and PhD programs), and several postgraduate certificate programs. The school opened its first satellite campus in Salina in 2017.

=== School of Health Professions ===
The School of Health Professions was established in 1974 and offers 25 different programs.

== Notable alumni ==
- Barney S. Graham, NIH virologist, Zika and COVID-19 vaccine specialist
- Jeff Colyer, plastic surgeon and 47th Governor of Kansas
- Paul Randall Harrington, orthopaedic surgeon
- Theodore K. Lawless, dermatologist and philanthropist
- Roger Marshall, US Representative and Senator (2017–present)
- Robert Simari, executive vice chancellor for KU Medical Center (2018–2024)
- Kathryn Stephenson, plastic surgeon
- George Tiller, physician
- Milton R. Wolf, physician
- Barbara Bollier, physician and state Senator
