= University of Kansas School of Medicine =

Medical school in Kansas City, Kansas, US

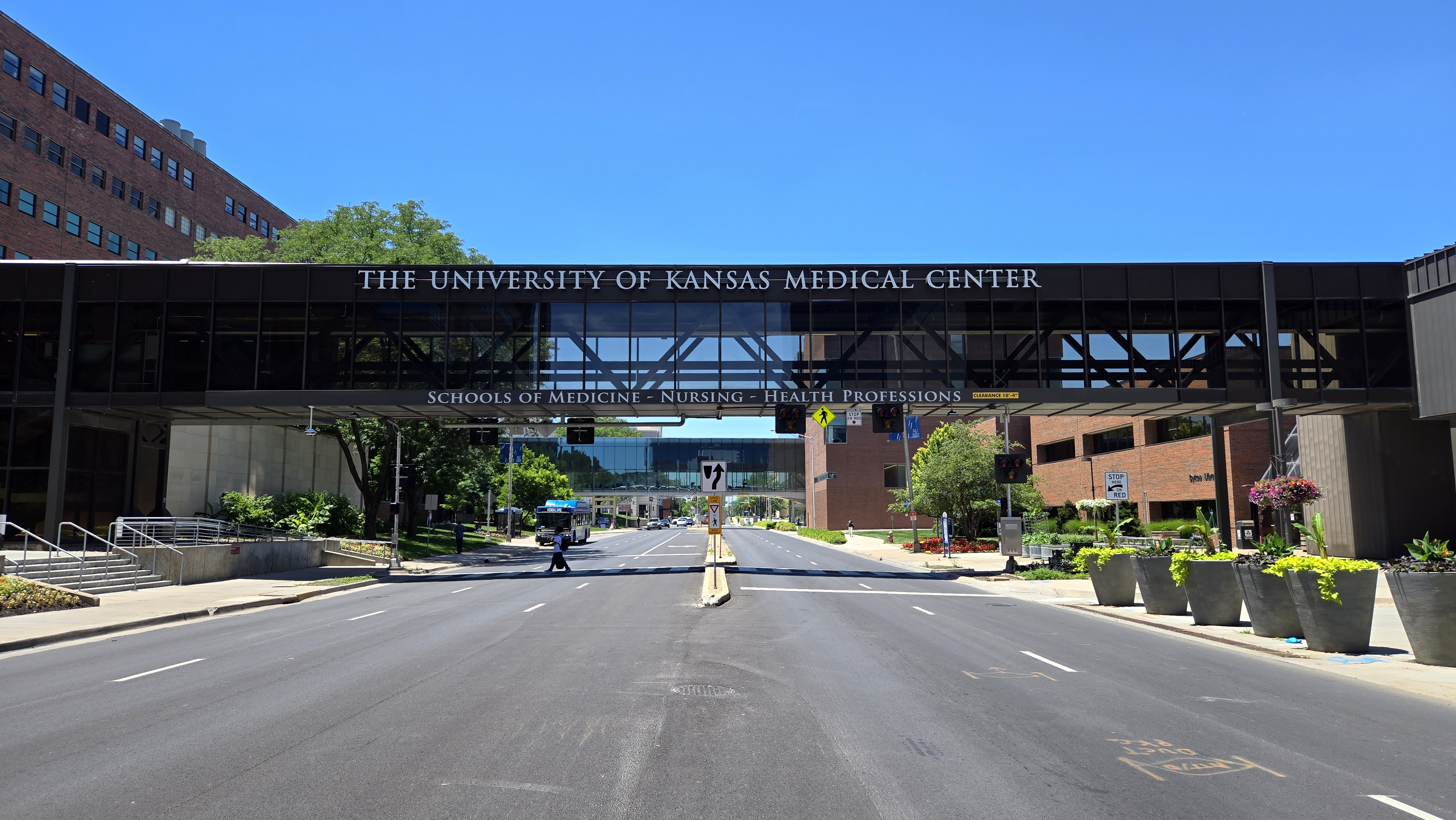
- Type: Medical school
- Established: September 6, 1905
- Parent institution: University of Kansas Medical Center
- Chancellor: Douglas A. Girod
- Vice-Chancellor: Steve Stites
- Dean: Akinlolu Ojo
- Students: 2,470 (Fall 2023)
- Location: Kansas City, Kansas, U.S.A. 39°03′21″N 94°36′40″W
- Campus: Multiple sites
- Website: medicine.kumc.edu

The University of Kansas School of Medicine is a public medical school located on the University of Kansas Medical Center campuses in Kansas City, Kansas, and also Salina, Kansas, and Wichita, Kansas. The Kansas City campus is co-located with the independent University of Kansas Health System, and they are commonly known collectively as KU Med.

== History ==
Medical instruction in the University of Kansas School of Medicine began in the 1880s with undergraduate instruction in medical topics at the University of Kansas, influenced principally by chemistry professor Edgar Bailey. Medical degrees were not awarded. The idea was more fully developed when professor Samuel Wendell Williston came to Kansas from Yale in 1890 and proposed that a specific two-year course of study for medicine should be implemented at KU. In 1899, Williston was named the first dean of this two-year program at KU.

The official establishment of the school came in 1905, when the Kansas Board of Regents authorized the creation of a full four-year medical school at KU, accomplished by merging the existing two-year school in Lawrence with three private medical schools in the Kansas City area: the College of Physicians and Surgeons, the Kansas City Medical College and the Medico-Chirurgical College. The School of Medicine was officially opened on September 6, 1905. Clinical instruction was originally held at the Eleanor Taylor Bell Memorial Hospital in Rosedale, Kansas. In 1924, the new School of Medicine moved south to its current location, 39th Avenue and Rainbow Boulevard in Kansas City, Kansas.

In 1995, the School of Medicine established a dual-degree MD–PhD program. In 2020, the program was awarded the prestigious Medical Scientist Training Program (MSTP) grant from the National Institute of General Medical Sciences (NIGMS), a division of the National Institutes of Health (NIH).

As of fall 2023, the School of Medicine has 2,470 students enrolled, including 830 students in the M.D. program.

== Wichita campus ==
The School of Medicine elected to open a campus in Wichita, KS in 1971. This campus received third and fourth year medical students for their clinical education and these students serve rotations at the Via Christi Health hospitals, Wesley Medical Center, and the Robert J. Dole VA Medical Center. Since 2011, the KU School of Medicine-Wichita has expanded to a four-year campus, serving students in their didactic and clinical education. There are over 200 students and 75 full-time faculty at the KU School of Medicine-Wichita.

The KU School of Medicine-Wichita also sponsors 13 residency programs in coordination with Via Christi Health and Wesley Medical Center. KU School of Medicine-Wichita also operates a multitude of patient care clinics such as Adult Health, Breast Cancer, Endocrinology, Gastroenterology, Internal Medicine, Neurology, Pediatrics, Psychiatry, and Psychology.

In addition to their MD program, the school offers an Office of Research and a Masters in Public Health graduate degree program.

== Salina campus ==
The School of Medicine opened a campus in Salina, KS in 2011 in order to address the critical shortage of physicians in Kansas. The Salina campus is the smallest four-year medical education site in the United States, with only eight students admitted per year. The mission of this campus is to produce physicians who will practice in under-served, rural areas. For their clinical education, medical students at the KU School of Medicine-Salina serve rotations at local Salina clinics, offices of rural physicians, and the Salina Regional Health Center.

== Notable alumni ==
- Barney S. Graham, NIH virologist, Zika and COVID-19 vaccine specialist
- Jeff Colyer, plastic surgeon and former Governor of Kansas
- Debora Green, physician who pleaded no contest to setting a 1995 fire which burned down her family's home and killed two of her children, and to poisoning her husband with ricin
- Paul Harrington, orthopaedic surgeon
- Theodore K. Lawless, dermatologist and philanthropist
- Roger Marshall, junior United States senator from Kansas
- Robert Simari, executive vice chancellor KU Medical Center (2017–2024)
- Kathryn Stephenson, plastic surgeon
- George Tiller, physician known for performing late term abortions, homicide victim
- Milton R. Wolf, physician
- Barbara Bollier, anesthesiologist, Kansas senator and US senatorial candidate
- Logan Clendening, medical historian and writer
- Christian Moody, basketball player and surgeon
