= Harvey Pratt =

American artist (1941–2025)

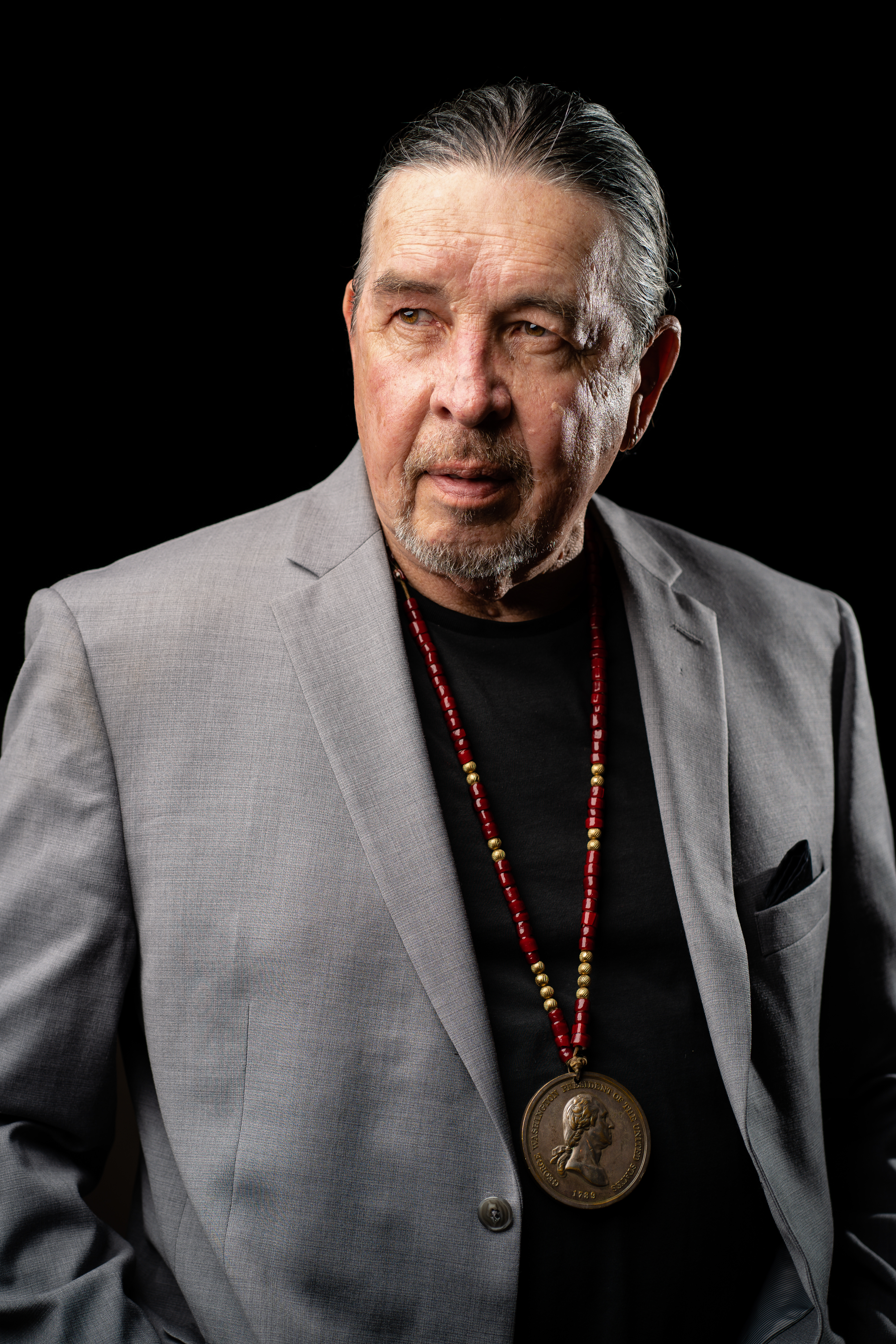
- Born: April 13, 1941; El Reno, Oklahoma, U.S.
- Died: December 31, 2025 (aged 84); Guthrie, Oklahoma, U.S.
- Citizenship: American; Southern Cheyenne
- Occupation: Forensic artist
- Years active: 1972–2017
- Known for: Soft tissue postmortem drawing
- Notable work: National Native American Veterans Memorial
- Political party: Democratic
- Relatives: William Bent (great-great-grandfather); Edmund Guerrier (great-grandfather)
- Military career
- Allegiance: United States
- Branch: United States Marine Corps
- Service years: 1962–1965
- Rank: Lance Corporal
- Unit: 3rd Marine Division
- Conflict: Vietnam War

Harvey Phillip Pratt (April 13, 1941 – December 31, 2025) was an American and Southern Cheyenne forensic artist. Pratt worked for over 40 years in law enforcement, pioneering the soft tissue postmortem drawing method for reconstruction of unidentified subjects. His drawings have aided law enforcement agencies both nationally and internationally. He also exhibited his traditional artwork in various institutions.

== Early life ==
Pratt was born in El Reno, Oklahoma, on April 13, 1941, to Oscar Noble Pratt and Anna Guerrier Pratt Shadlow. His mother, Anna, was the 1987 National Indian Woman of the Year. He was a member of the Cheyenne and Arapaho Tribes. Pratt was the great-grandson of scout, guide, interpreter and Sand Creek massacre survivor, Edmund Guerrier. He was the great-great-grandson of American frontiersman, William Bent.

== Forensic art ==
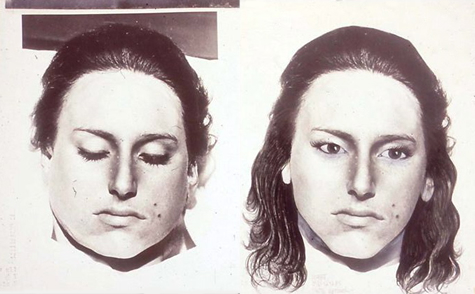
Example of postmortem drawing by Harvey Pratt, of Pamela Buckley, the Sumter County Jane Doe, who remained unidentified until 2021.

Pratt began his career with Oklahoma's Midwest City Police Department in 1965, where, as a police officer, he completed his first composite drawing that resulted in an arrest and conviction. He joined the Oklahoma State Bureau of Investigation in 1972 as a narcotics investigator and retired as an assistant director in 1992, retaining his position as a full-time forensic artist. Pratt fully retired from the bureau in 2017.

In the mid-1980s, Pratt developed the soft tissue postmortem drawing method. Using this method, the forensic artist draws or paints on the photograph of a victim to repair tissue damage or decomposition. The drawing repairs the trauma to the victim so that the final image will be more presentable when asking for law enforcement's or the public's assistance in identification. This work helped in several high-profile cases both on a national and international level, including the Oklahoma Girl Scout murders, the Oklahoma City bombing and the 1993 World Trade Center bombing. For his work with the OSBI he was inducted into the Oklahoma Law Enforcement Hall of Fame in 2012 and the Oklahoma Military Hall of Fame in 2019.

== Native American art ==
As a self-taught artist, Pratt's works encompassed several media, including painting, sculpting, and architectural design. He intended to blend his experience in law enforcement and forensic art with Native American influences. Pratt received awards for his artwork at Inter-Tribal Indian Ceremonials, Gallup, New Mexico, and Red Earth Festival, Oklahoma City, Oklahoma. In 2005, he was selected as "The Honored One" for the 2005 Red Earth Festival.

His works are in many permanent collections, including the National Park Service and the Smithsonian Institution. He accepted a state appointment to the Oklahoma Arts Council by Governor Frank Keating in 2002.

The Smithsonian's National Museum of the American Indian chose Pratt's Warriors' Circle of Honor, a 12-foot tall, stainless-steel circle balanced on a curved stone drum as the centerpiece of the National Native American Veterans Memorial. The memorial was installed outside the museum in 2020, but the official in-person dedication ceremonies did not take place until Veterans Day weekend of 2022 because of the COVID-19 pandemic.

== Bigfoot forensics and artwork ==
Pratt provided forensic artwork for David Paulides in the books Tribal Bigfoot and The Hoopa Project. Through extensive research, interviews, and travels, Pratt produced dozens of forensic sketches from witnesses that David Paulides and he met in California and his home state of Oklahoma. Pratt also has an online store on his own personal website where he sells Bigfoot artwork.

== Personal life and death ==
Pratt was recognized as one of the traditional Cheyenne Peace Chiefs, also known as the Council of Forty-Four. He was recognized by the Cheyenne People as an Outstanding Southern Cheyenne.

Pratt's first marriage, to Mary Frances Immenschuh, with whom he had two children, ended in divorce. A second marriage to Michelle Moran also ended in divorce; their son, Nathan, is a chainsaw artist. In 1997 Pratt married Gina Posey Christian, an agent with the state Alcoholic Beverage Laws Enforcement Commission and member of the Creek Nation. He lived in Guthrie, Oklahoma. He died there on December 31, 2025, at the age of 84.
