= Vox Theatre =

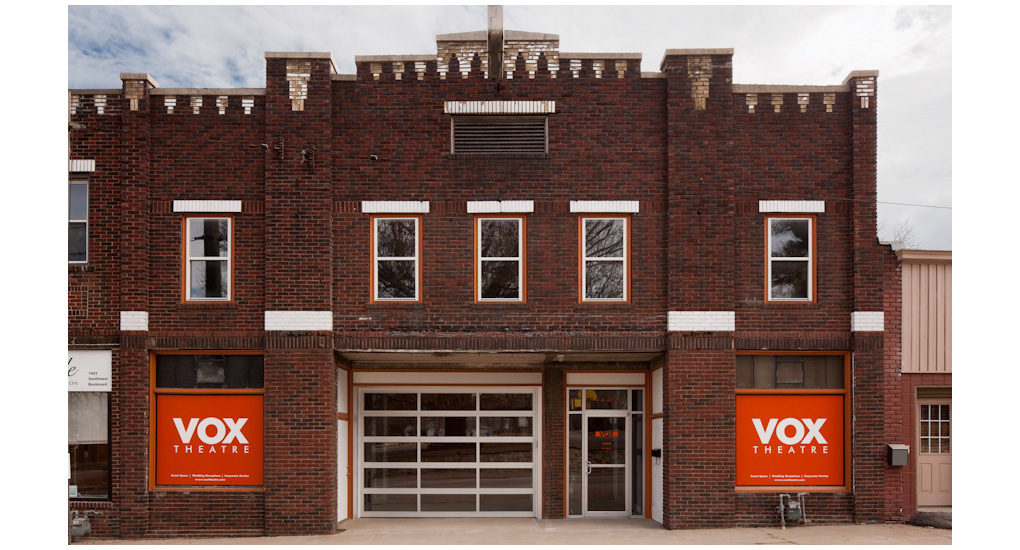
- Vox Theatre
- Interactive map of Vox Theatre
- Location: 1405 Southwest Boulevard. Kansas City, Kansas; Kansas
- Coordinates: 39°3′30.3″N 94°37′44.9″W
- Capacity: 750 originally 300 currently
- Type: Silent movie theatre

Construction
- Built: 1922
- Opened: 1922
- Renovated: 2009

Website
- Official website

The Vox Theatre is an event space located in Rosedale, Kansas.

== History ==
The Vox Theatre opened as the Rosedale Theatre on December 20, 1922, as a silent movie theater. The Rosedale Theatre was originally owned by T.L. Ricksecker and cost $30,000 to construct. The theater is located at 1405 Southwest Boulevard in the Rosedale neighborhood of Kansas City, Kansas.^{(1)} Originally it was located across the street from Whitmore School. The Whitmore School was razed in 1973 and replaced by Whitmore Park.

In the early 1940s, the name of the theatre was changed to the Vox Theatre and the venue was playing movies with sound.^{(2)}

By the early 1960s, the trend of small intimate theatres gave way to the large drive-in theatres and the Vox Theatre was sold to Westport Heating and Cooling which used the building to manufacture sheet metal ductwork. Later, the space housed a workshop for restoring antique automobiles.

In January 2009, Alistair Tutton purchased the building and brought back the name the Vox Theatre. Tutton remodeled the space to be used for his photography studio and an event space. With the space being 5,000 square feet (460 m^{2}) with 20-foot (6.1 m) ceilings the ability to transform the space into many different uses was created.

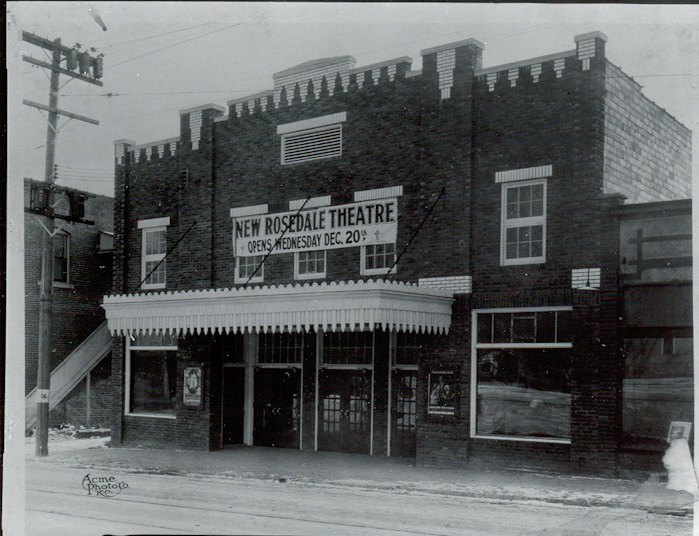
Vox Theatre in 1922

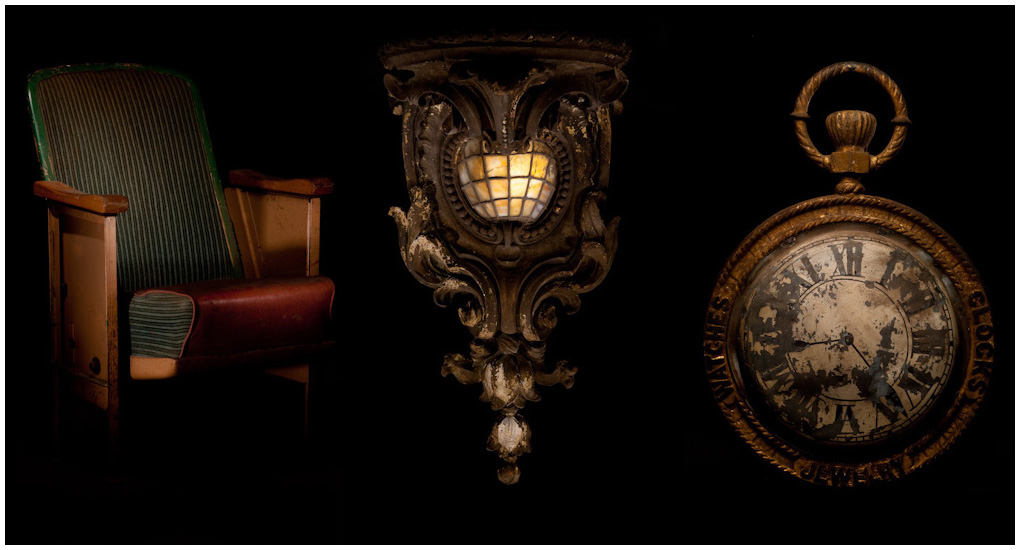
Original seat and light fixture

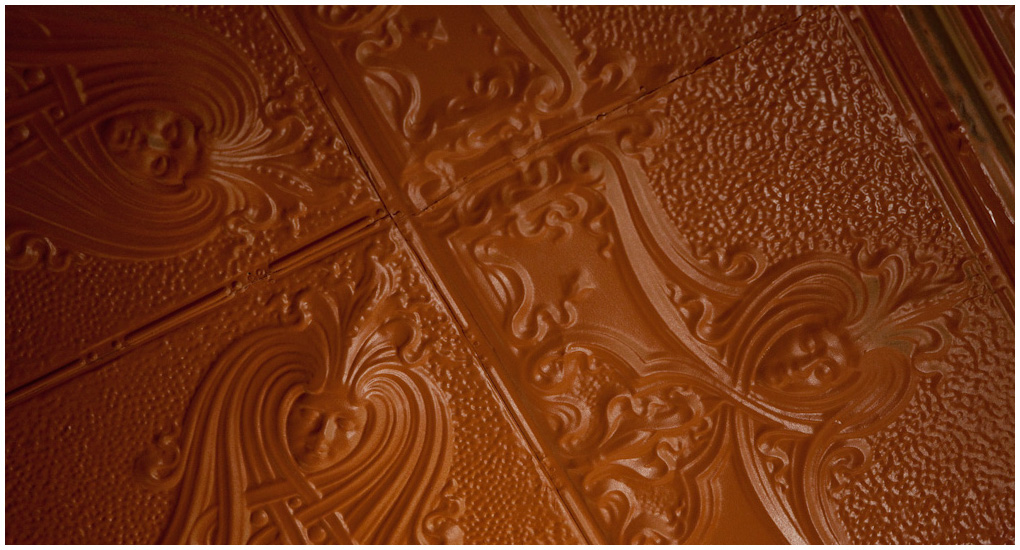
Original tin ceiling

== Remodel ==
During the remodel, the current owner tried to keep as much of the original structure as possible. The original pressed tin ceiling was preserved. The projection room was converted to office space which houses, Alistair Tutton Photography, Vox Theatre Event Space and Springboard Creative. Although the balcony no longer exists, the archways that led to the balcony are still present. The original stage floor has also been preserved. Stage curtains were purchased from a local high school and along with the refurbished stage valance lighting the theatre look was complete.

== Nearby sites of interest ==
- Rosedale Arch - a site dedicated to Rosedale residents serving in World War 1
- Sauer Castle - legendary haunted house
- Boulevard Drive-In - a drive-in theater built in 1950 that still show movies on the big screen on the weekend every summer
- University of Kansas School of Medicine, leading academic hospital in Rosedale
- Oklahoma Joe's Barbecue, famous barbecue restaurant Kansas City-style barbecue
