= Argentine, Kansas City, Kansas =

Neighborhood of Kansas City, Kansas

Coordinates: 39°04′30″N 94°40′21″W

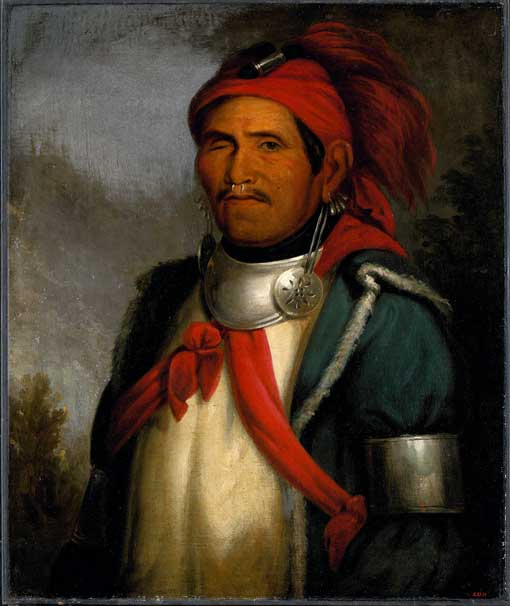
The "Shawnee Prophet", Tenskwatawa died in Argentine in 1836

Argentine is a community of Kansas City, in the southern part of Wyandotte County, Kansas, United States. It is bordered on the west by the Turner community, on the east by the Rosedale community, on the south by Johnson County, and on the north by Armourdale community and by the Kansas River.

Argentine was primarily recognized for the prosperous silver smeltery for which it was named. Built on the site of a former Shawnee reservation, the proximity of the railroad, local lumber sources, the smeltery, and in later years, steel manufacturing, meant that the city enjoyed a considerable amount of economic success for quite some time.

When the smeltery finally closed, the city found itself in the throes of an unprecedented financial crisis and began to seek entry to nearby Kansas City in 1907. Although the community was annexed and became the seventh ward of Kansas City, Kansas in 1910, the neighborhood retains its own distinct flavor and personality.

Prominent nearby landmarks include Argentine Carnegie Library (the last Carnegie library in the Kansas City metropolitan area), the grave of Tecumseh's brother, the Shawnee prophet Tensquatawa at White Feather Spring, Sauer Castle at 945 Shawnee Road, and the Argentine mural located at 30th Street and Metropolitan Avenue.

The neighborhood is the location of one of three rail yards on the Atchison, Topeka and Santa Fe Railroad, the Argentine Yard.

== Education ==
=== Primary and secondary schools ===
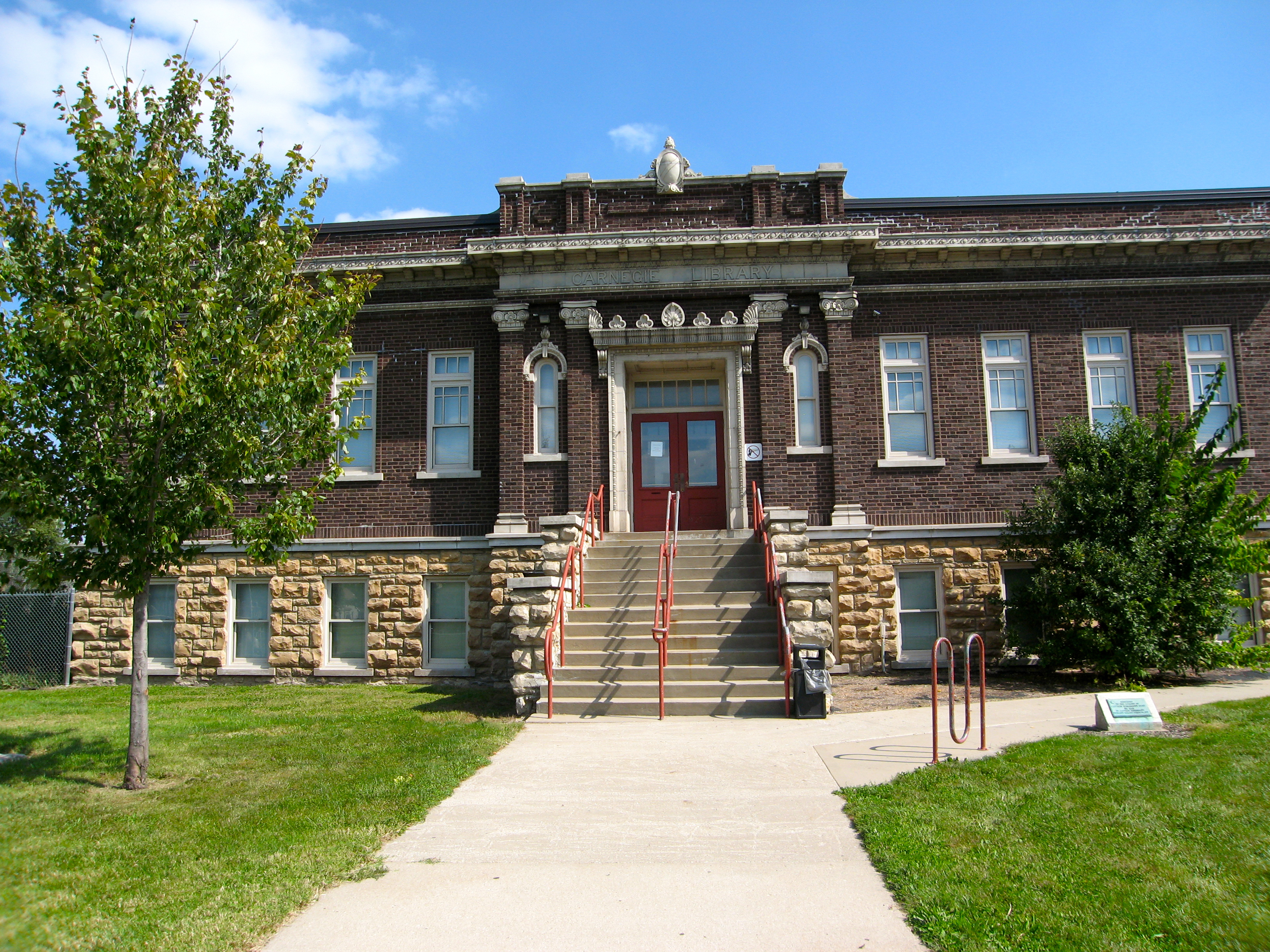
The former Argentine Carnegie Library

It is in the Kansas City, Kansas School District. Its local high school is J. C. Harmon High School, which opened in 1973 as the fusion of Argentine Senior High School and Rosedale Senior High School. The neighborhood has its own middle school, Argentine Middle School.

=== Public libraries ===
Kansas City, Kansas Public Library currently operates the South Branch Library in Argentine, with 21,000 square feet (2,000 m^{2}) of space. The name was chosen to reflect that it serves the entire southern region of the city and not a single neighborhood.

It formerly operated the Argentine Carnegie Library which opened in 1911 in a storefront and received its own Carnegie building in 1917. By 1998 it, on the National Register of Historic Places, was the sole remaining Carnegie library in the city. In 2012 the current South Branch opened, and it cost $6 million, with a third of it made in fundraisers by local residents. The school district agreed to pay for the rest if residents raised $1.5 million to $2 million. An old grocery store was demolished to make way for the current library, and the school district took possession of the former library.
