= Rosedale, Kansas City, Kansas =

Neighborhood in Kansas City, Kansas, U.S.

Coordinates: 39°03′28″N 94°37′11″W

Wyandotte County, Kansas 1899 Map from History of Kansas by Noble Prentis

Rosedale, Kansas is a community of Kansas City, Kansas, in the southeast corner of Wyandotte County and bordered on the north by the Kansas River and the Armourdale neighborhood, on the south by Johnson County, on the west by the Argentine neighborhood, and on the east by the state of Missouri. It is home to the Rosedale World War I Memorial Arch and the University of Kansas Medical Center.

== History ==
The all-time areawide record Great Flood of 1844 had naturally diverted the mouth of the Turkey Creek from the Missouri River to the Kaw (Kansas) River in what became Rosedale. Later, the early household water supplies were wells, cisterns, and Turkey Creek. The creek also provisioned manufacturing, ice, and church baptisms.

"The Town of Rosedale, Shawnee Township" originated in 1872. In 1875, the state of Kansas instated a new population requirement of 600 persons was established to become a "City of the Third Class". A petition was presented to Hiram Stevens, Judge of the Tenth Judicial District (Wyandotte, Johnson, and Miami counties). He issued an order for incorporating the village as the City of Rosedale, Kansas. Election of officers was held August 28, 1877.

By 1897, Rosedale had a population of over 2,000. It remained a city until it was annexed by Kansas City, Kansas, in 1922.

The wide area has been disastrously flooded through measurable history by the Kansas River and Turkey Creek, especially here. In addition to 1844, major floods were in 1903, on June 1, 1935, and on September 13, 1961. The city has participated in major engineering efforts, including with the U.S. Army Corps of Engineers, to instate flood control for itself and on behalf of the area. From 1911-1920, an areawide flood project was designed and built, with key engineering to divert the confluence of the Turkey Creek into the Kansas River in Rosedale. Local subprojects also include the Turkey Creek Diversion Tunnel through Greystone Heights Hill, straightening the creek in Rosedale, and a new bridge across Southwest Boulevard.

== Education ==
=== Primary and secondary schools ===
It is in the Kansas City, Kansas School District.

Elementary schools include:

- T. A. Edison Elementary School has about 330 students. Edison, in 1954, received a ten room expansion.
- Noble Prentis School: Noble Prentis School was built in 1912 as a four room school. An additional four rooms and activity room were installed in 1950 with an additional expansion on floors 2 and 3 in 1955.
- Frank Rushton Elementary School: Maple Leaf School was built in Rosedale in 1911 and later renamed after University of Kansas chancellor Dr. Francis Huntington Snow. A new building was built in 1956, and the school was renamed again after Rosedale Schools and later Kansas City Schools board member Frank Rushton.

Rosedale Middle School is the local middle school. Its local high school is J. C. Harmon High School.

==== History of education ====
"Cooks Hall" hosted the first school in Rosedale, and "The Public School" or "The White School", later "Whitmore" after one of the teachers, was the first standalone school. The average enrollment was about 250 people. In 1899 the new Whitmore school, with eight regular rooms and four other rooms, was established, with construction bids received the previous August.

The Ely School served the then-rural northern part of Rosedale.

Rosedale High School originated in 1884 within "The Public School", and in 1886 it had its first graduating class, made up of seven students, after 1905 each year had its own graduating class. A dedicated building was constructed for $25,000 in 1906. In 1913 there were 115 students. The city voted for an expansion worth $28,000 in 1913, and the east wing was established, including the gymnasium, in the summer of that year. On March 18, 1927, a new school was built for $160,000. The school district demolished the 1906 building that year. 7th graders from other schools were transferred to Rosedale High, now Rosedale Junior-Senior High School, in 1927.

Attucks School, the second major school built in Rosedale, had a building constructed in 1889 and a new brick building in 1939, the latter colored tan.

"The Brick School", renamed Columbian in 1892 in honor of the Columbian Exposition, was constructed for $8,000 in 1888 with four rooms. An expansion added for additional rooms. In 1930 the Kindergarten building opened.

A Shawnee area had, in 1876, a school built called the Macchochaque School, a part of the District 39/Malvern Hill school district, with the name meaning "Place of Refreshment". Rosedale annexed the school in 1911. Subsequently a new two story school building was established, initially with eight rooms and later with an auditorium and four more rooms added.

The University of Kansas Medical Center bought the Macchochaque School in 1958 and demolished it in Spring 1968; Macchochaque students were reassigned to Edison and Snow. The University-Rosedale Urban Renewal Agency purchased the Columbian School in March 1966 and demolished it the following October. Attucks School closed in 1972 and began housing commercial purposes around 1975. Rosedale Senior High merged with Argentine Senior High School to form J.C. Harmon High in 1973. The former Rosedale High was converted into a junior high school. The former Whitmore School was demolished in 1973.

=== Public libraries ===
The Kansas City, Kansas Public Library previously operated the Rosedale Branch. On March 15, 1927, the library branch opened in Rosedale High.

== Notable people ==
- James P. Cannon, founding leader of the Socialist Workers Party.
- Frank L. Hagaman, former Governor of Kansas
- Dick Harp, University of Kansas basketball coach

== Points of interest ==
- Rosedale World War I Memorial Arch, memorial for World War I veterans of Rosedale, Kansas
- Boulevard Drive-In, drive-in movie theater that has been in operation since 1950, showing movies every weekend during the summer
- Sauer Castle, legendary haunted house
- University of Kansas Medical Center, School of Medicine, and Hospital
- Vox Theatre, formerly a silent movie theater, turned event space
