= J. C. Harmon High School =

Public high school in Kansas City, Kansas, USA

Location
- 2400 Steele Road; Kansas City, Kansas; United States; 39°3′47.93″N 94°39′23.67″W

Information
- Type: Public high school Secondary school
- Established: 1973; 53 years ago
- School district: Kansas City USD 500
- Principal: Edward Franco
- Grades: 9–12
- Gender: Co-educational
- Enrollment: 1,285 (2024-2025)
- Campus: Urban
- Colors: Purple, yellow and white
- Athletics: 5A
- Athletics conference: KCK-Atchison League
- Mascot: Hawk
- Nickname: Hawks
- Rival: Wyandotte High School, Washington High School, Sumner Academy of Arts & Science
- Newspaper: Talon
- Yearbook: Aerie
- Website: J. C. Harmon H.S.

J. C. Harmon High School is a fully accredited, public high school located in Kansas City, Kansas, United States. It serves students in grades 9 to 12 and operated by the Kansas City USD 500 school district. The mascot is the Hawks and the school colors are purple, yellow, and white.

== History ==
In September 1973, J. C. Harmon High School opened. The school was named after J. C. Harmon, the former principal of Argentine High School from 1924 to 1954. It opened in 1973 as the fusion of Argentine Senior High School and Rosedale Senior High School. J. C. Harmon was opened the same year as F. L. Schlagle High School. Bill D. Todd was the first principal. Both Argentine High School and Rosedale High School were converted into middle schools when J. C. Harmon was opened.

== Sports and activities ==
J. C. Harmon is a part of Kansas 6A classification. The school offers many sports and activities, including: volleyball, boys and girls basketball, football, wrestling, baseball, softball, boys and girls soccer, bowling, track and field, golf, cross country, Scholar's Bowl, forensics, debate, robotics, and choral music.

J. C. Harmon High School athletes hold two Kansas State High School State track and field records in events that were later discontinued. Ron Talley set the 880 yard run record in 5A boys track and field in 1974 with a time of 1:56.1. Jeff Smith set the 100 meter low hurdles record in 6A boys track and field in 1979 with a time of 14.3.

== Notable alumni ==
- Richard Estell, former NFL wide receiver
- Bernard Harvey ("Harv"), music producer, songwriter, and music director
- Mark Haynes, former NFL player who played in 3 Pro Bowls (1982, 1983, 1984) and 3 Super Bowls (1987, 1988, 1990)
- Janet Murguia, current president and CEO of UnidosUS, the US's largest Latino nonprofit advocacy organization in Washington, DC
- Mary H. Murguia, current Chief Judge of the United States Court of Appeals for the Ninth Circuit in Phoenix, AZ

== See also ==
- List of high schools in Kansas
- List of unified school districts in Kansas

Other high schools in Kansas City USD 500 school district

- F. L. Schlagle High School in Kansas City
- Washington High School in Kansas City
- Wyandotte High School in Kansas City
- Sumner Academy of Arts and Science in Kansas City
