= Marvin Robinson (politician) =

American politician (1956/1957–2024)

Member of the Kansas House of Representatives from the 35th district
- In office January 9, 2023 – August 23, 2024
- Preceded by: Broderick Henderson
- Succeeded by: Wanda Brownlee Paige

Personal details
- Born: April 15, 1957 Kansas City, Kansas, U.S.
- Died: August 23, 2024 (aged 67)
- Party: Democratic

Military service
- Allegiance: United States
- Branch/service: Navy

Marvin S. Robinson II (April 15, 1957 – August 22, 2024) was an American politician who served in the Kansas House of Representatives from 2023 until his death in 2024. He unsuccessfully ran for reelection in August 2024, having lost the Democratic primary to challenger, Wanda Brownlee Paige. He died several weeks after losing his reelection bid.

== Life and career ==
Robinson was born on April 15, 1957 in Kansas City, Kansas. He graduated from Sumner High School. He attended Emporia State University and Temple University. He dropped out of college. He served in the United States Navy as an operations specialist and was honorably discharged. Robinson worked for organizations in Wyandotte County, Kansas that serve underprivileged minority groups. He advocated for the preservation and study of the Quindaro Townsite.

Robinson was elected in 2022 to represent District 35 of the Kansas House of Representatives. He succeeded his first cousin, Broderick Henderson. A Democrat, he voted with Republicans on a number of issues, overriding governor Laura Kelly's vetos.

In 2023, Robinson broke ranks with his party to provide the single Democratic vote needed to override a veto and pass into law bills to restrict transgender rights, abortion access, and access to food stamps. Many within his party accused him of siding with the Republicans in exchange for $250,000 of state funding to restore a historic gazebo.

On August 6, 2024, Robinson lost his reelection bid to Democratic challenger, Wanda Paige, after having received just 22% of the vote. He died of pancreatic cancer several weeks later, on August 22, at the age of 67.
