= Kansas City School District =

Kansas City School District may refer to:

- Kansas City, Missouri School District
- Kansas City, Kansas Public Schools
