= Washington High School (Kansas) =

Public high school in Kansas, United States

Location
- 7340 Leavenworth Road; Kansas City, Kansas 66109; United States; 39.1436°N 94.7490°W

Information
- School type: Public high school
- Established: 1932
- School district: Kansas City USD 500
- Principal: Rebecca Skinner
- Grades: 9 to 12
- Enrollment: 1,188 (2024-2025)
- Campus: Urban
- Colors: Burgundy; White
- Athletics: 5A
- Athletics conference: Meadowlark League
- Mascot: Wildcats
- Rival: Wyandotte High School, F. L. Schlagle High School, J. C. Harmon High School, Sumner Academy of Arts and Science
- Newspaper: Washingtonian
- Yearbook: Hatchet
- Website: School website

Washington High School is a public high school located in Kansas City, Kansas, United States. It serves students in grades 9 through 12 and is operated by the Kansas City USD 500 school district.

== History ==
On January 4, 1932, Washington High School (originally named Washington Rural High School) opened on Leavenworth Road in the northwest part of Wyandotte County, Kansas. The school was named after the first United States President George Washington. The new high school formed from the creation of Rural High School District #2 of Wyandotte County

Washington Rural High School's attendance area abutted the west boundary of the Kansas City, Kansas School District, but was outside the city limits of Kansas City, Kansas. The Washington attendance area population grew rapidly in the 1950s and 1960s for two reasons. First was the post-World War II baby boom with middle-class families moving into the area. The second reason was the commencement of white flight from Kansas City, Kansas.

In 1962, due to a new Kansas law that required the merger of elementary school districts and high school districts to provide "unified" K-12 districts, Washington High School District USD 201 was formed. But by 1965, with rapid population growth and an urgent need for new schools, the new school district faced a financial crisis. Due to the lack of a strong industrial/ commercial tax base and comparatively low residential property values, the district did not have the available tax base and corresponding tax revenues to fund its capital needs to expand.

The Washington District responded to its challenging situation by authorizing an election in 1966 to decide if USD 201 would be absorbed by Kansas City, Kansas Public Schools. That election measure narrowly passed, resulting in USD 500 annexing USD 201 in 1967.

The resulting expanded USD 500 district responded to the overcrowding at Washington High School by opening F. L. Schlagle High School three miles away at 59th Street and Parallel Parkway in 1972.

== Sports and activities ==
Washington is a part of the Kansas State High School Activities Association 5A classification The school offers many sports and activities, including: Volleyball, Girls Basketball, Boys Basketball, Football, Wrestling, Baseball, Softball, Girls Soccer, Boys Soccer, Bowling, Track and Field, Cross Country, Scholars Bowl, Forensics, Debate, Robotics, and Choral Music.

=== State championships ===
==== Team ====
Washington High School has two team Kansas State High School State Championships which were in 5A-1A boys bowling in both 2010 and 2011.

==== Individual ====
- In 1974, Mark Hosking won the 5A-4A boys tennis state championship.
- In 1977, Rosa Kelly set the 5A girls 440 yard dash record (race has been discontinued) of 56.8.
- In 1978, both the Washington boys 2-Mile Relay team (8:04.0) and the Washington girls Mile Relay team (4:10.7) set Kansas 5A state championship meet records.
- In 1978, Paul Cowan won the 5A boys 330 intermediate hurdles (race has been discontinued) in a state record time of 39.5.
- In 1982, Washington High School athletes won both the boys (Brad Ogden) and girls (Mary Shaffer) 6A cross country championships.
- In 1991, Wendell Gaskin set both the 6A boys 400 meter dash record (46.76) and 200 meter dash record (21.29).
- In 2010, Le'Tristan Pledger set the 5A girls 100 meter high hurdles record of 13.90. In 2009, Pledger set the 5A girls long jump record of 19'10.75".
- In 2011, Cedric Phillips won the 5A-1A boys individual bowling state championship.

== Notable alumni ==
- Harry Colon, former NFL player
- Wendell Gaskin, former and USA Track and Field athlete
- Nathan Louis Jackson, playwright
- Paul J. Morrison, former Kansas Attorney General
- Darrell Stuckey, former NFL player with San Diego Chargers and current Director of Football Relations at University of Kansas football
- Earl Watson, former NBA player, head coach of Phoenix Suns, and former assistant coach of Toronto Raptors
- Freddie Williams II, American comic book writer

== See also ==
- List of high schools in Kansas
- List of unified school districts in Kansas

Other USD 500 schools

- J. C. Harmon High School
- F. L. Schlagle High School
- Wyandotte High School
- Sumner Academy of Arts and Science
