= F. L. Schlagle High School =

Location
- 2214 North 59th Street; Kansas City, Kansas; United States; 39°7′52″N 94°43′07″W

Information
- School type: Public high school
- Established: 1973; 53 years ago
- School district: Kansas City USD 500
- Principal: Lazell Williams
- Grades: 9 to 12
- Enrollment: 844 (2024-2025)
- Campus: Urban
- Colors: Blue, Gold and White
- Athletics: 5A
- Athletics conference: KCK-Atchison League
- Mascot: Stallions
- Rival: Wyandotte High School, Washington High School, J. C. Harmon High School, Sumner Academy of Arts & Science
- Newspaper: Stallion Post
- Yearbook: Equestrian
- Website: F.L. Schlagle H.S.

F. L. Schlagle High School is a fully accredited, public high school located in Kansas City, Kansas, United States. It serves students in grades 9 to 12 and is operated by the Kansas City USD 500 school district. The principal is Lazell Williams. The mascot is the Stallion and the school colors are blue, white, and gold.

== History ==
In September 1973, F. L. Schlagle High School opened. The school was named after Frank Leslie Schlagle, the former superintendent of schools of the Kansas City, Kansas School District (1932–1962). The opening of the school was accompanied by a major shift in attendance zones between the old Washington district and the old USD #500. The Schlagle zone was carved from the Washington and Wyandotte areas, but in addition, a major part of the Wyandotte zone lying generally north of Quindaro Boulevard and east as far as 12th Street was attached to the Washington zone. Those changes significantly increased the numbers and proportions of Black students at Washington, reduced Black enrollment at Wyandotte, and established an integrated student body at Schlagle. The opening of F. L. Schlagle coincided with the opening of J. C. Harmon High School

== Sports and activities ==
F. L. Schlagle is a part of Kansas 5A classification. The school offers many sports and activities, including: Volleyball, Girls Basketball, Boys Basketball, Football, Wrestling, Baseball, Softball, Girls Soccer, Boys Soccer, Bowling, Track and Field, Cross Country, Scholar's Bowl, Forensics, Debate, Robotics, Choral Music, and a Skateboarding Team.

== Team State Championships ==
Schlagle High School has won two Kansas State High School State Championships which were both in 5A boys basketball in 1993 and 1995.

== Individual State Championship Records ==
- Deborah Crawford holds the Kansas State High School 4A girls high jump record of 5'6" set in 1977.

== Marching band ==
The F. L. Schlagle Marching Stallions utilize a high-step southern style marching.

The Marching Stallions have traveled and performed at many different locations and events including a yearly performance at the Big 12 men's basketball tournament at the T-Mobile Center in Kansas City, Missouri.

== Notable alumni ==
- Trai Byers, American actor known for playing Andre Lyon
- Jennifer Jo Cobb, race car driver and team owner
- Stephanie D. Davis, U. S. District Court judge and U. S. Court of Appeals judge
- Tyon Grant-Foster, basketball player for the Grand Canyon Antelopes
- Maurice Greene, Gold medal-winning U.S. Olympic track and field sprinter
- Janelle Monáe, Grammy-nominated singer and actress best known for Hidden Figures and Moonlight
- Damian Rolls, former MLB player and former hitting coach of the Kansas City T-Bones
- Sam Simmons, former NFL player

== See also ==
- List of high schools in Kansas
- List of unified school districts in Kansas

Other high schools in Kansas City USD 500 school district

- J. C. Harmon High School in Kansas City
- Washington High School in Kansas City
- Wyandotte High School in Kansas City
- Sumner Academy of Arts and Science in Kansas City
