= Argentine Carnegie Library =

- Argentine Branch Library
- U.S. National Register of Historic Places
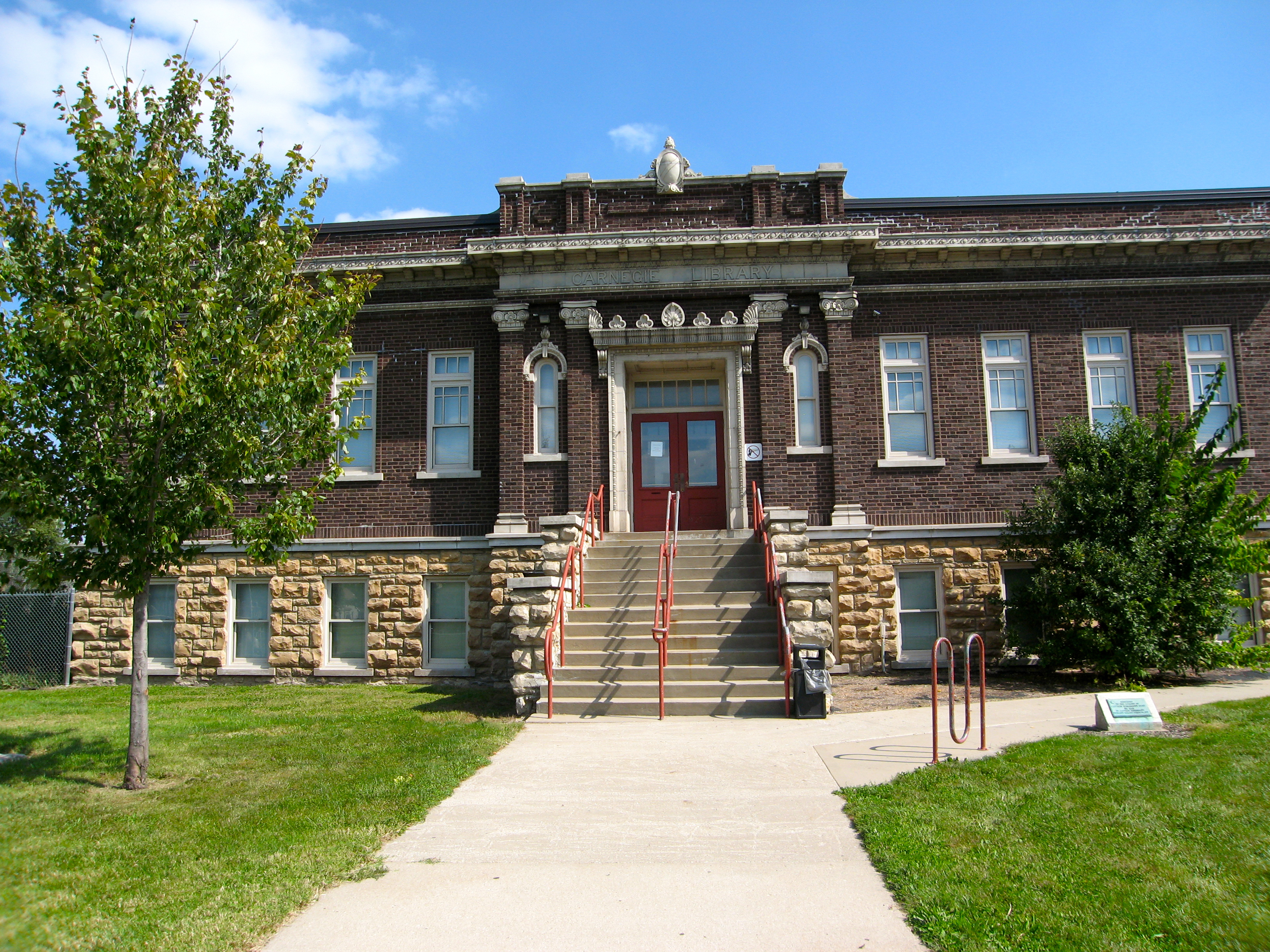

- Location within Kansas Location within the United States
- Location: Kansas City, KS
- Coordinates: 39°4′26.92″N 94°39′39.33″W
- Built: 1916
- Architect: William W. Rose, David B. Peterson
- Architectural style: Classical Revival
- NRHP reference No.: 86000919
- Added to NRHP: April 30, 1986

The Argentine Branch Library, sometimes known as the Argentine Carnegie Library is a building located at 2800 Metropolitan Avenue in the Argentine neighborhood of Kansas City, Kansas that formerly served as a branch of the Kansas City, Kansas Public Library (KCKPL).

It was designed by Rose and Peterson (Architects). It was deemed as one of the KCK's historic landmarks on March 28, 1985. It was placed in the Register of Historic Kansas Places on November 23, 1985, and listed on the National Register of Historic Places on April 30, 1986.

The Kansas City, Kansas Public Library has moved the collections and staff from Argentine to the new SOUTH BRANCH, at 3104 Strong Ave., a few blocks to the west and north, which opened Sep 26, 2012. The library has turned over the building to the Kansas City, Kansas USD 500.

== History ==
The building was built during 1916–1917. It is a one-story brick building on a raised limestone block foundation, with a flat roof. It has a Classical Revival-style pavilion at the main entrance. The building has 7,500-square-foot (700 m^{2}) of space. The library itself was first established in a storefront in 1911 and moved into the Carnegie building in 1917. It has 7,000 square feet (650 m^{2}) of space.

By 1998 it was the sole remaining Carnegie library in the city. By 2012 the library had 22 computers.

In 2012 the current South Branch opened, with a new name chosen to reflect it serving the entire area of the city. The previous Argentine Library was decommissioned due to difficulties in accommodating disabled people and in rewiring the facility. The Kansas City School District helped pay for the new library and took possession of the old library.
