= Asa Beebe Cross =

American architect (1826–1894)

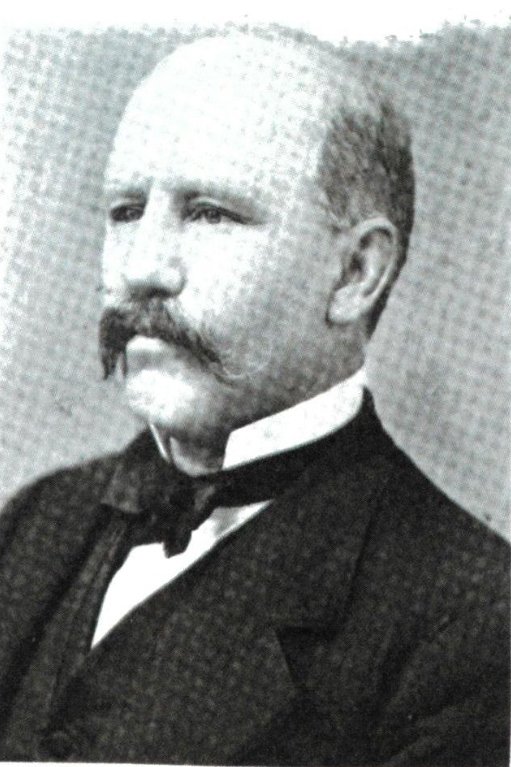
Asa Beebe Cross (before 1894)

Asa Beebe Cross (December 9, 1826 in New Jersey — August 18, 1894) was an American architect. He studied architecture under Thomas Walsh and John Johnson. He primarily worked in Kansas City where it is estimated that he designed more than 1,000 structures. He designed Union Depot in Kansas City (opened 1878), Seth E. Ward Homestead for Seth Ward, Old Jackson County Courthouse in Kansas City, Missouri, and the Vaile Mansion. He designed many homes in Quality Hill. His grandson, Alfred E. Barnes, was also an architect.

== Works ==
- Gillis Opera House, 5th and Walnut, Kansas City, Missouri, completed 1883
- Old Jackson County Courthouse, Kansas City, Missouri, also known as the Truman Courthouse, adapted from unfinished construction in 1872
- Sauer Castle, 935 Shawnee Rd. Kansas City, KS, believed to be a Cross design, 1871
- Seth E. Ward Homestead, 1032 W. 55th St., Kansas City, Missouri, Cross
- St. Patrick's Catholic Church, 8th and Cherry
- Union Depot, Kansas City, Missouri, (built in 1878, predecessor to Kansas City Union Station)
- Vaile Mansion, 1500 N Liberty St, Independence, Missouri, completed 1881
- Vaughan's Diamond Building, 9th and Delaware, Kansas City, Missouri, completed 1870
- Wornall House, 146 W. 61st St. Kansas City, Missouri, Cross
