= Broderick Henderson =

American politician

Member of the Kansas House of Representatives from the 35th district
- In office January 9, 1995 – January 9, 2023
- Preceded by: Tom Bruns
- Succeeded by: Marvin Robinson

Personal details
- Born: February 21, 1957 (age 69) Kansas City, Kansas, U.S.
- Party: Democratic

Broderick Henderson (born February 21, 1957) is an American politician. He was as a Democratic member of the Kansas House of Representatives, representing the 35th district. He served from 1995 to 2023.

Henderson works as the Director of Parking Control for Kansas City. He was succeeded by his first cousin, Marvin Robinson.

== Committee membership ==
- Commerce and Labor
- Federal and State Affairs
- Government Efficiency and Fiscal Oversight
- Joint Committee on Special Claims Against the State

== Major donors ==
The top 5 donors to Talia's 2008 campaign:

- 1. Kansans for Lifesaving Cures $700
- 2. Chesapeake Energy $500
- 3. Kansas Assoc of Realtors $500
- 4. Ruffin, Phil $500
- 5. Kansas Contractors Assoc $500
