= William Guerrier =

William Guerrier (1812 – February 16, 1858) was a businessman and Cheyenne interpreter on the Santa Fe Trail and Oregon Trail and is believed to have been the first rancher in what is now Wyoming.

Guerrier was born in St. Louis, Missouri. After moving west, he married a Cheyenne woman and had a son Edmund Guerrier in 1840.

In 1844, he began working for William Bent at Fort Bent on the Santa Fe Trail. In 1845, he acted as interpreter in a meeting near the fort to create a peace treaty between the Cheyenne and the Delaware who had been forced west by the Indian Removal Act.

In 1848, he struck up a business arrangement with Seth E. Ward called Ward and Gurrier.

In 1849 his wife died of cholera. Guerrier sent his son back East to St. Louis University while he and Ward continued their trading business with settlers.

Ward and Guerrier got the exclusive sutler contract for Fort Laramie in 1851. In 1852 they moved to a few miles to Register Cliff. Their practice of trading goods for the worn oxen of settlers is sometimes said to make them the first ranchers in Wyoming.

He died when sparks from his pipe hit an open gunpowder keg.

== Sources ==
- Barde, Fred S. - Edmund Gasseau Choteau Guerrier: French Trader - The Chronicles of Oklahoma Vol. XLVII number 4 Winter 1969, The Oklahoma Historical Society.
- Hafen, LeRoy R. - The Mountain Men and the Fur Trade of the Far West - The Arthur H. Clark Company, Glendale 1968.
- Hafen, LeRoy R. - The W. M. Boggs Manuscript About Bent's Fort, Kit Carson, the Far West and Life Among the Indians - The Colorado Magazine Vol. VII number 2 March 1930, The State Historical Society of Colorado.
