= Richard Estell =

American football player (1963–2022)

No. 84, 71, 89
- Position: Wide receiver

Personal information
- Born: October 12, 1963; Kansas City, Kansas, U.S.
- Died: February 15, 2022 (aged 58)
- Listed height: 6 ft 2 in (1.88 m)
- Listed weight: 210 lb (95 kg)

Career information
- High school: J.C. Harmon (Kansas City)
- College: Kansas
- NFL draft: 1986: undrafted

Career history
- Kansas City Chiefs (1986)*; Indianapolis Colts (1987)*; Kansas City Chiefs (1987); Hamilton Tiger-Cats (1988–1990); New Orleans Night (1992)
- * Offseason or practice squad member only

Awards and highlights
- Second-team All-American (1985); First-team All-Big Eight (1985)

Career NFL statistics
- Receptions: 3
- Receiving yards: 24
- Stats at Pro Football Reference
- Stats at ArenaFan.com

Richard Wayne Estell (October 12, 1963 – February 15, 2022) was an American professional football player who was a wide receiver in the National Football League (NFL), Canadian Football League (CFL), and Arena Football League (AFL). He played college football for the Kansas Jayhawks.

Estell was born in Kansas City, Kansas, and attended J.C. Harmon High School. He played college football for the Kansas Jayhawks, earning second-team All-American honors as a senior.

Estell was signed by the Kansas City Chiefs as an undrafted free agent in 1986. He played in two games for the Chiefs, with three receptions.

He also played for Hamilton Tiger-Cats in the CFL and New Orleans Night in the AFL.

Estell died on February 15, 2022, at the age of 58.
