= Seth Ward (businessman) =

Seth Edmund Ward
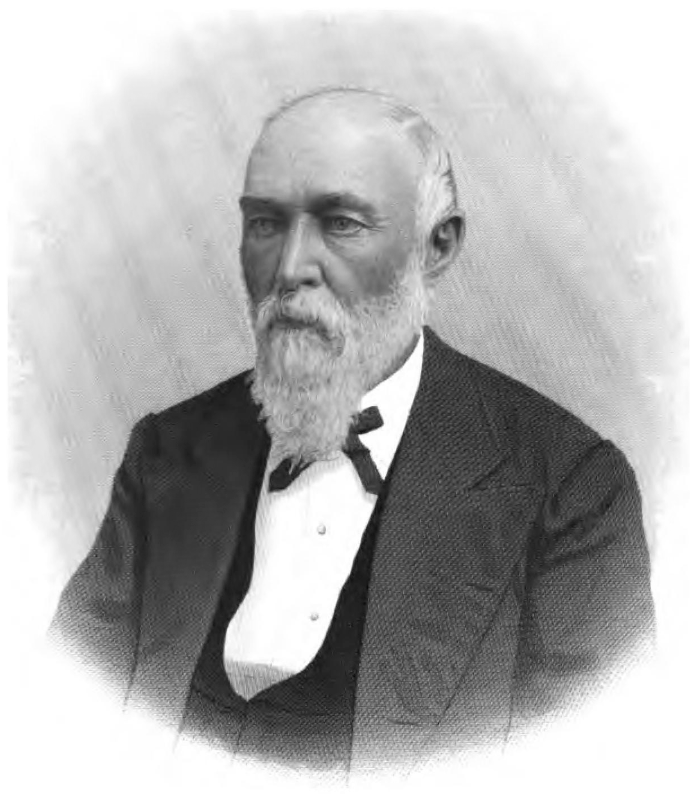
- Born: March 4, 1820; Campbell County, Virginia
- Died: December 9, 1903 (aged 83); Kansas City, Missouri
- Burial place: Forest Hill Cemetery
- Occupation: Merchant
- Spouses: Wasna (m. 1853) Mary Frances McCarty (m. 1860)
- Children: 7

Seth Edmund Ward (March 4, 1820 – December 9, 1903) was a trader on the California, Oregon and Santa Fe trails who parlayed his success into a real estate empire, some of which is part of today's Country Club District in Kansas City, Missouri.

== Early life ==
Ward was born in Campbell County, Virginia, on March 4, 1820. His father died when he was 12 and he was apprenticed to an Indiana farmer. Tired of farming he returned home where his mother gave him $25 and he was left to his own devices. He traveled to Independence, Missouri, where he was hired by Lancaster P. Lupton to be a trapper for his company in Colorado and traveled to Fort Lupton, Colorado.

== Business career ==
In 1848 with the collapse of the fur trade business, he struck up a business with William Guerrier with the firm of Ward and Guerrier to provide supplies for settlers in Colorado and Wyoming.

In 1853 he married Wasna, a Teton Sioux woman, and fathered four children. On April 30, 1857, through connections with Robert Campbell, Ward and Guerrier were commissioned to be the official sutlers at Fort Laramie, giving them a monopoly at the busiest post on the frontier. They were to move later to Register Cliff. Since they were trading goods for oxen from the settlers it is said that Guerrier and Ward were the first ranchers in Wyoming history. Guerrier died in 1858 when sparks from his pipe ignited a powder keg.

== Move to the Midwest ==
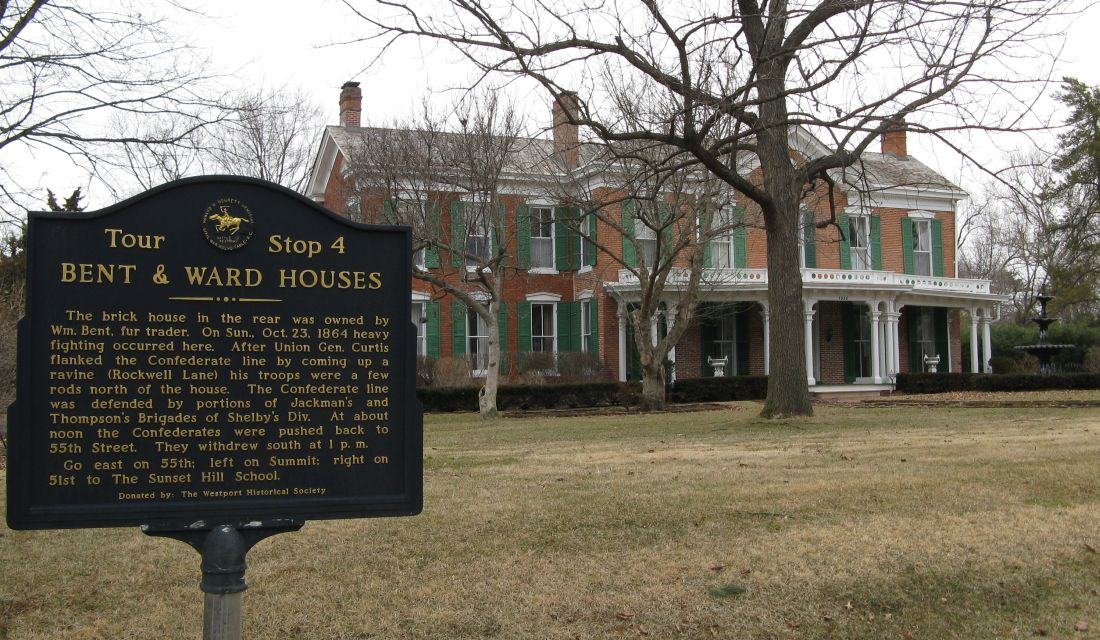
Seth Ward house in Kansas City

On February 9, 1860, Ward married Mary Frances McCarty, the widowed daughter of Col. John Harris of Westport, Kansas City. McCarty refused to live in Fort Laramie and Ward eventually moved with her to Nebraska City, Nebraska, in 1863. In 1871, when his time as official sutler expired, he moved to Kansas City where he bought the 450-acre (1.8 km^{2}) farm of a trading friend William Bent. The farm ran from State Line to Wornall Road, 51st to 55th Street. He incorporated Bent's home at 1032 West 55th St. into a 14-room mansion designed by Asa Beebe Cross.

In 1897 he leased the east pasture for the Kansas City Country Club's first golf course, where his son Hugh was a founding member.

Seth Ward died at his home in Kansas City on December 9, 1903. He was buried at Forest Hill Cemetery.

Hugh inherited his father's estate, but died only four years later, in 1908. In 1925, in a deal brokered by J.C. Nichols, Hugh Ward's widow sold the land to the widow of Jacob Loose to create a park. The Kansas City Country Club moved across the state line to adjacent Mission Hills, Kansas. The 80 acres (320,000 m^{2}) would become Loose Park in 1926. Ward Parkway which passes near the Seth E. Ward Homestead which is on the National Register of Historic Places is named for family (although for his son Hugh Ward).
