= Seth E. Ward Homestead =

Historic house in Missouri, United States

- Ward, Seth E., Homestead
- U.S. National Register of Historic Places
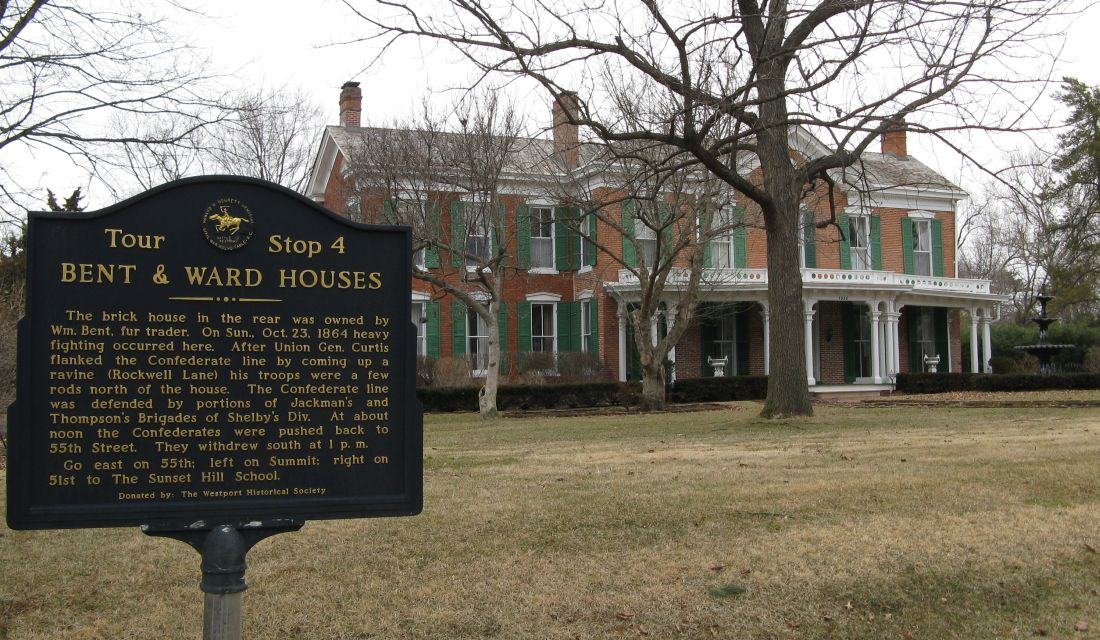
- The Seth E. Ward Homestead

- Location within Missouri Location within the United States
- Location: 1032 W. 55th St., Kansas City, Missouri
- Coordinates: 39°1′42″N 94°36′6″W
- Area: 1 acre (0.40 ha)
- Built: 1871
- Architect: Asa Beebe Cross
- Architectural style: Greek Revival
- NRHP reference No.: 78001664
- Added to NRHP: February 17, 1978

The Seth E. Ward Homestead, also known as Ward House or Frederick B. Campbell Residence is a historic home located in the Country Club District, Kansas City, Missouri. It was designed by Asa Beebe Cross and built in 1871. It is a two-story, "T"-plan, vernacular Greek Revival style brick dwelling. It features a single story, full-width front verandah. It was a home of Seth E. Ward.

It was listed on the National Register of Historic Places in 1979.
