= Lea Hopkins =

American LGBTQ rights activist

- Born: 1944 (age 81–82)
- Occupations: Activist, poet, model
- Known for: Founding Kansas City's pride parade

Lea Hopkins (born 1944) is an American LGBT rights activist and poet from Missouri, best known for founding Kansas City's pride parade.

== Early life ==
Hopkins grew up in Kansas City, Missouri. She realized she was gay at age 13. In 1962, she graduated from Sumner High School.

== Career ==
Hopkins was the first Black Playboy Bunny in Kansas City, and the fourth overall in the country. She later became a professional model with the Barbizon Agency, and helped her coworkers negotiate for higher pay.

Hopkins has published several books of poetry, and has written for The Kansas City Star.

== Activism ==
Hopkins moved to New York City in the 1970s, and became involved with the gay liberation movement there. She returned to Kansas City in 1974. Shortly afterward, she joined the city's chapter of the Metropolitan Community Church. She also went on to co-found Kansas City's Christopher Street organization and the Gay Injustices Fund.

In 1977, Hopkins organized Kansas City's first pride parade, which numbered about 25-30 people. A few weeks later, in July 1977, she organized a protest against Anita Bryant, who was speaking at a bookstore in the city.

In April 1980 she was featured in Essence. In August 1980, she was a featured speaker at the Southeastern Conference of Lesbians and Gay Men in Memphis, Tennessee. She was again a speaker at the conference in June 1986 in New Orleans.

In subsequent years, Hopkins worked for GLAAD and was an advisory board member of the Lesbian and Gay Community Centre in the neighborhood of Westport.

In the 1990s, Hopkins served as a spokeswoman for GLAAD on "Out There", a public access program by and about queer people from Kansas City.

In 2022, Hopkins was named Grand Marshal of that year's Kansas City Pride parade.

== Personal life ==
Hopkins had one son, Jason (died 1997), whom she conceived with a friend's help.
