= Vaile Mansion =

Historic house in Missouri, United States

- Harvey M. Vaile Mansion
- U.S. National Register of Historic Places
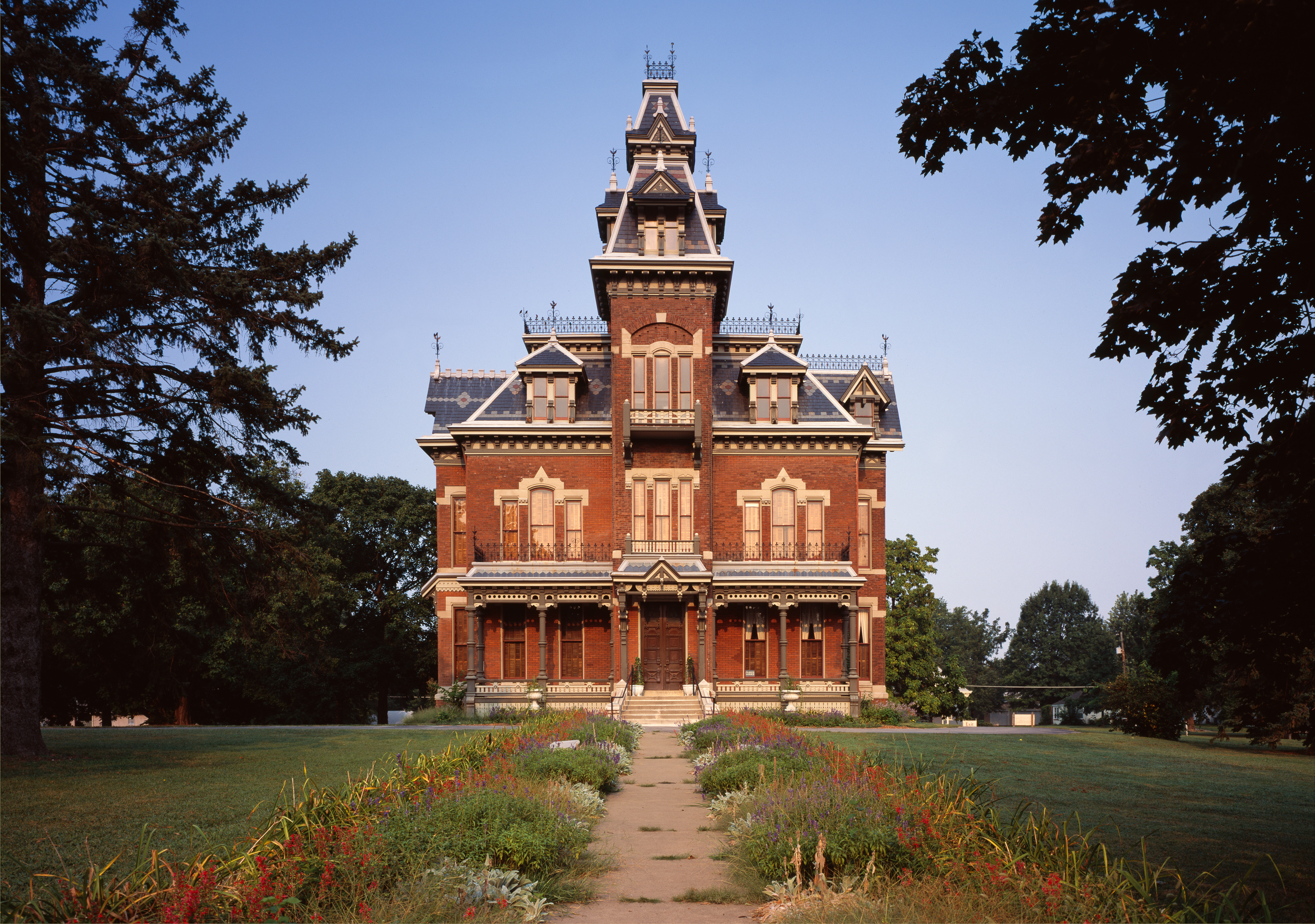
- Interactive map showing Vaile Mansion’s location
- Location: 1500 N. Liberty St., Independence, Missouri
- Coordinates: 39°06′29″N 94°25′02″W
- Area: 5.6 acres (2.3 ha)
- Built: c. 1871–1881
- Architect: Asa B. Cross
- Architectural style: Second Empire
- NRHP reference No.: 69000108
- Added to NRHP: October 1, 1969

The Harvey M. Vaile Mansion is located at 1500 North Liberty Street in Independence, Missouri. Built in 1881 for businessman Harvey M. Vaile, it is a locally significant example of Second Empire architecture. The house was listed on the National Register of Historic Places in 1969 and designated locally in 2002; it is open to the public as a museum.

== History ==
The house was built for Colonel Harvey Merrick Vaile and his wife, Sophia. Vaile was born in Vermont in 1831; he graduated in law from the University of Louisville and moved to Kansas City, Missouri in 1859, before finally settling in Independence in 1870. A "strong supporter of the abolitionism movement" with a passion for politics, he was among the founders of the Republican Party in Jackson County. Vaile shrewdly built his wealth by investing in several business ventures, primarily interests in the construction of the Erie Canal; he was also part-owner and operator of Star Mail routes, with rights for the route to Santa Fe. Vaile was a prominent figure in Independence business and social circles, and "desired a magnificent residence as an outward expression of his wealth." Construction began around 1871, and the mansion was completed in 1881, at a cost of $150,000 (the equivalent of about $4.7 million in 2025, when adjusted for inflation). The Vaile Mansion quickly became the showplace of Jackson County, and offered "lavish hospitality to notables of the 1880s and 1890s including many U.S. Senators and congressional representatives."

In the early 1880s Vaile was involved in the Star route scandal. Charged with defrauding the government, he faced two trials, in 1882 and 1883: both of them ended in a not guilty verdict, but Vaile had to spend more than $100,000 in trial expenses. In February 1883, while he was in Washington, D.C., his wife Sophia, who had been diagnosed with stomach cancer, was found dead at home from a morphine overdose, in what was a case of suspected suicide. Vaile occupied the mansion until his death in 1894; immediately thereafter, his heirs contested ownership of the estate in a legal battle that lasted five years.

The house changed hands multiple times over the ensuing decades; in 1908 it became a sanatorium, and was subsequently converted by attorney Carey May Carroll into a nursing home and the operating site for "Vaile Pure Water Co.," a spring water bottling company. After Miss Carroll's death, the mansion, which was threatened with demolition, was purchased by Roger and Mary Mildred DeWitt, who started making repairs; in 1983 it was acquired by the City of Independence through a donation by Mrs. DeWitt, and underwent a long-term restoration project. The Harvey M. Vaile Mansion is now a historic house museum operated by the Vaile Victorian Society, a non-profit organization established in 1983 by a group of local residents.

== Description ==
The Harvey M. Vaile Mansion was designed by Kansas City architect Asa Beebe Cross (1826–1894) in the Second Empire style; its design was reportedly inspired by a large house visited by Vaile and his wife in Normandy. The symmetrical structure consists of a two-and-a-half-story block surmounted by a three-story central tower; constructed of hand-pressed red brick (purchased at a cost of $50,000), it features an elaborate one-story porch, limestone moldings, heavy bracketed cornices, dormered mansard roofs, and multicolor slate shingles. The profusion of applied ornament well exemplifies "the High Victorian taste for leaving no surface areas untouched." The tall, narrow windows, together with the central tower's double mansard roof, emphasize the strong sense of verticality of the façade.

When completed, the Vaile Mansion was, according to an 1882 Kansas City Times reporter, "the most princely house and the most comfortable home in the entire west." It features thirty-one rooms with fourteen-feet-high ceilings decorated by French, German, and Italian artists. All of the original furniture was auctioned off when the estate left the Vaile family (the house was refurnished by the Vaile Victorian Society after 1983); however, the interiors still boast the original paintwork, nine marble fireplaces (one of which cost $1500), and two of the three original chandeliers, originally intended for the White House (Harvey Vaile was able to purchase them for $800 while he was in Washington, D.C., because there was some flaw in them). State-of-the-art amenities original to the house include speaking tubes, gasoliers, indoor running hot and cold water, and flush toilets; equipped with a built-in 6,000 gallon water tank, the Vaile Mansion was the first house in Jackson County with indoor plumbing.

The mansion was originally surrounded by a 630-acre estate (now reduced to a mere 5.6 acres), which included a grape vineyard and an apple orchard. Vaile had a wine processing plant on his property, as well as a wine cellar capable of holding 48,000 gallons.

== Gallery ==
Images from the Historic American Buildings Survey (Jack Boucher, April/May 1986)

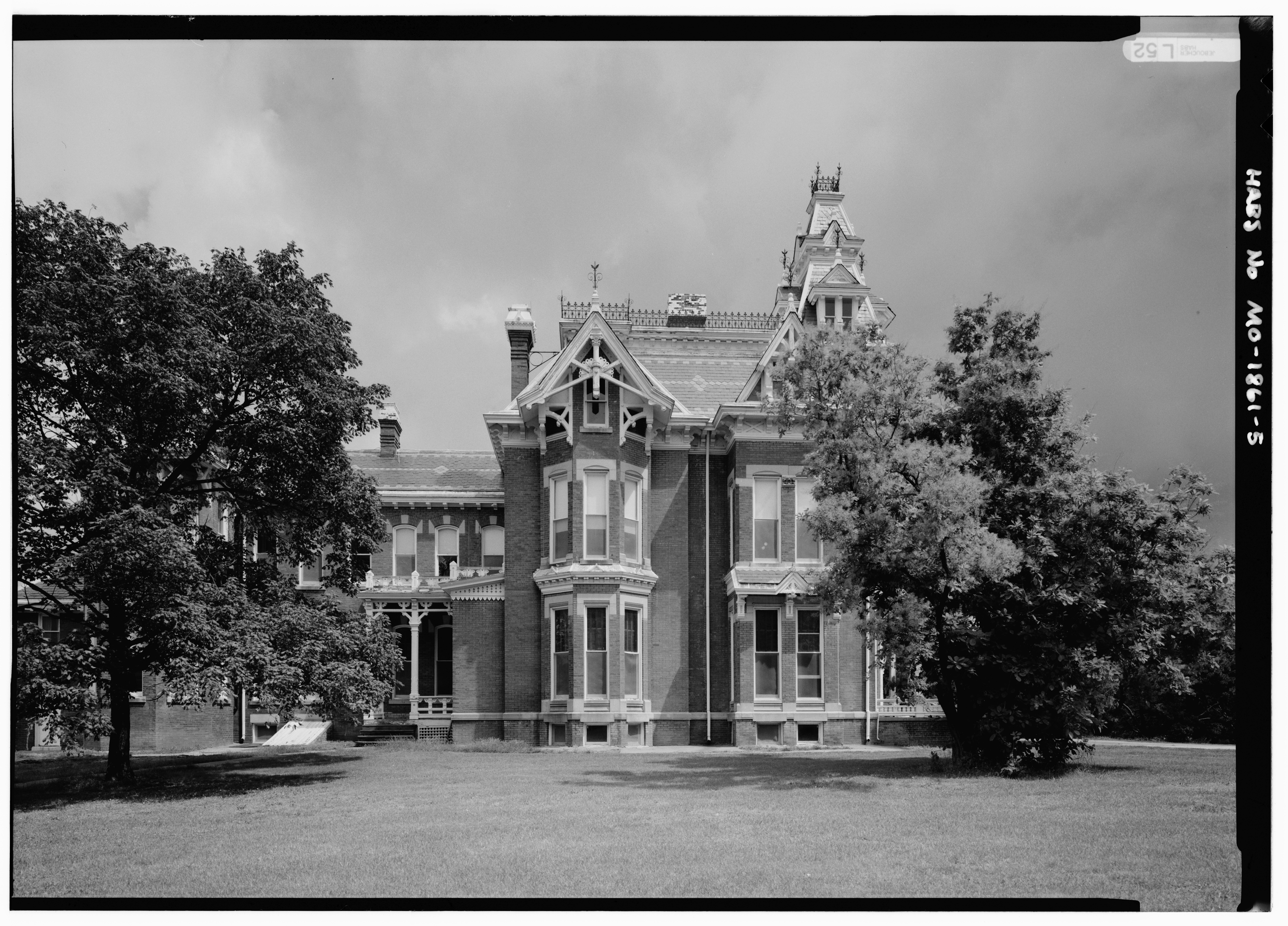
South elevation

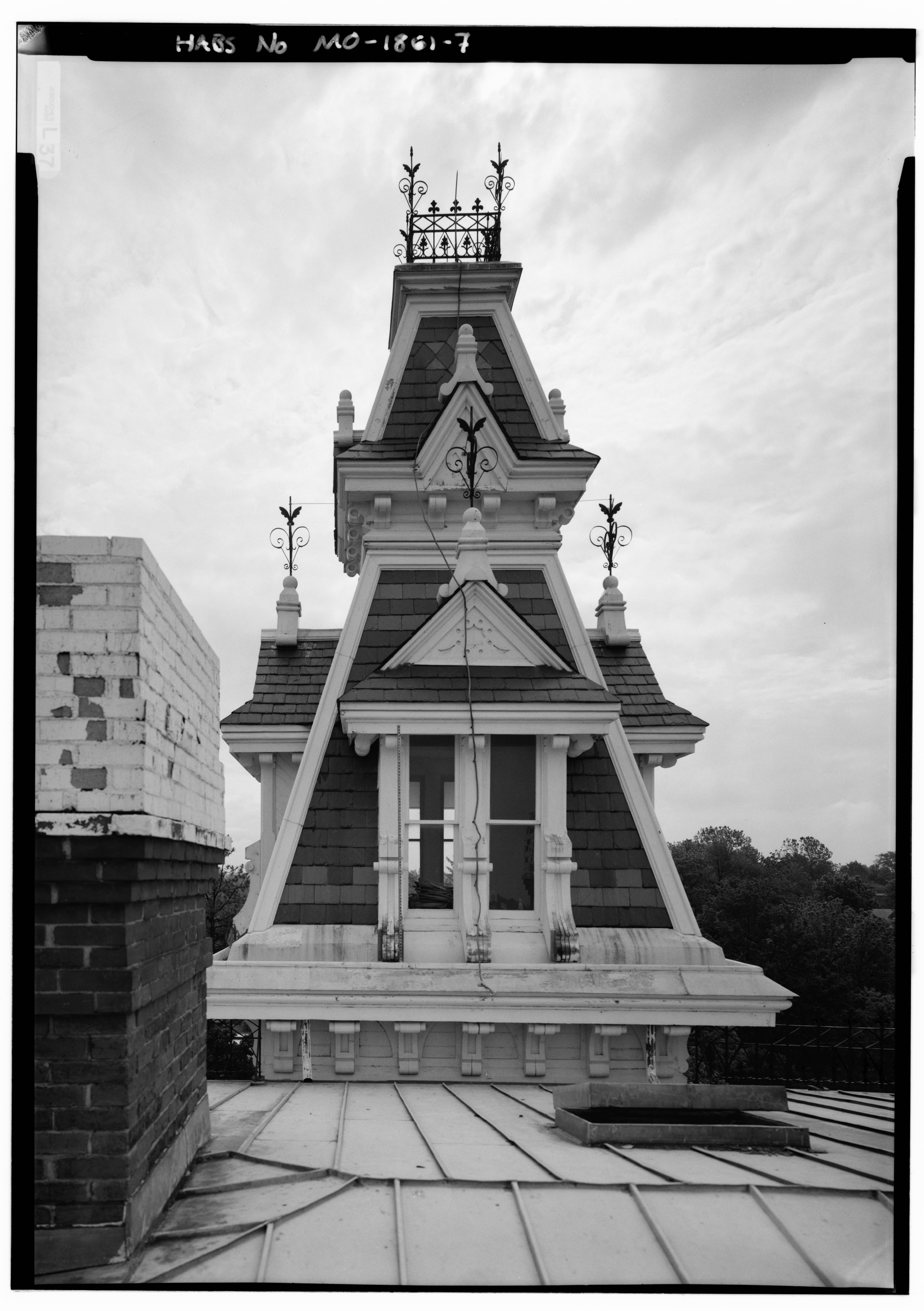
Tower

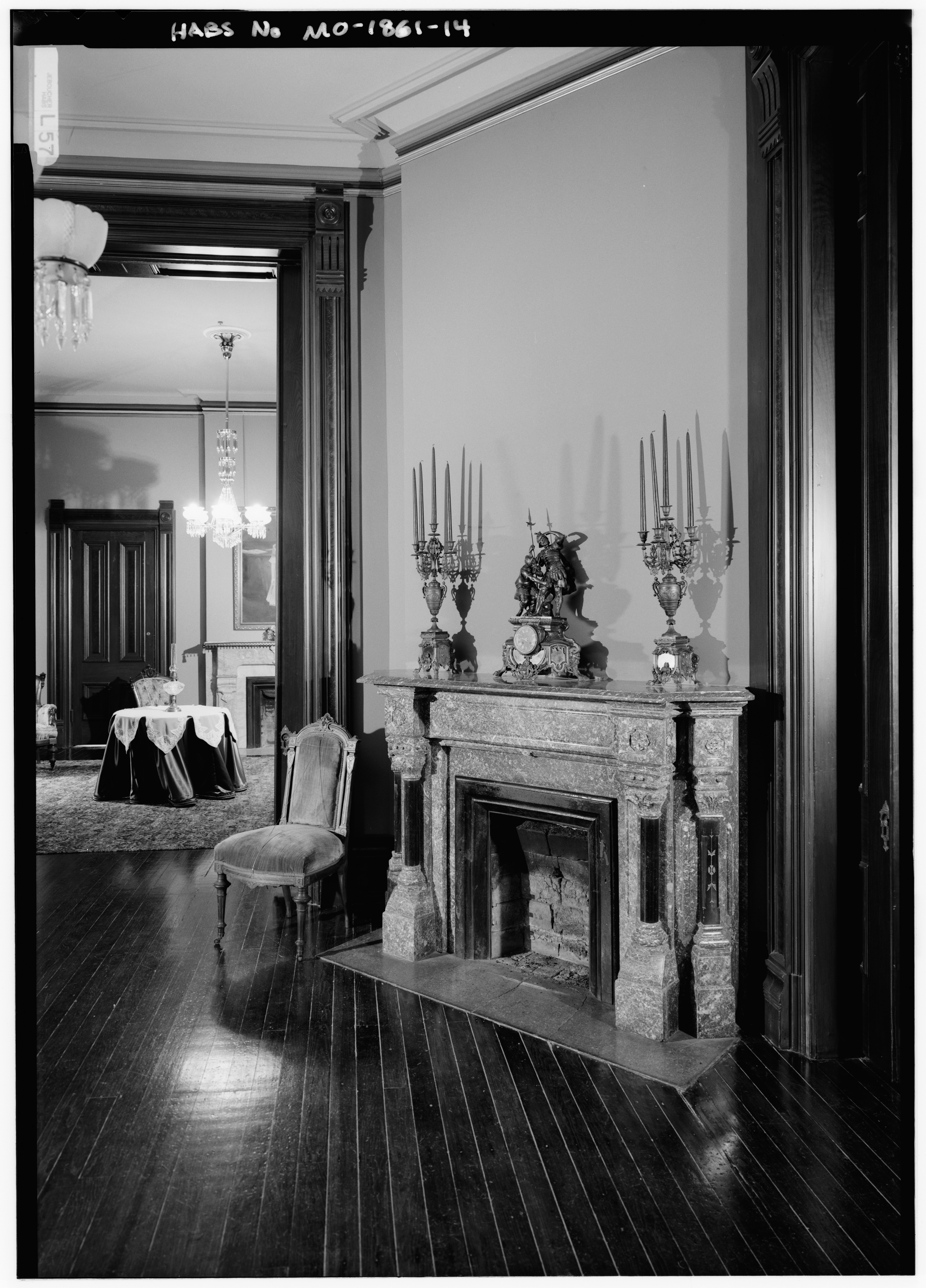
Interior photo, showing one of the mansion's nine marble fireplaces (east parlor, first floor)

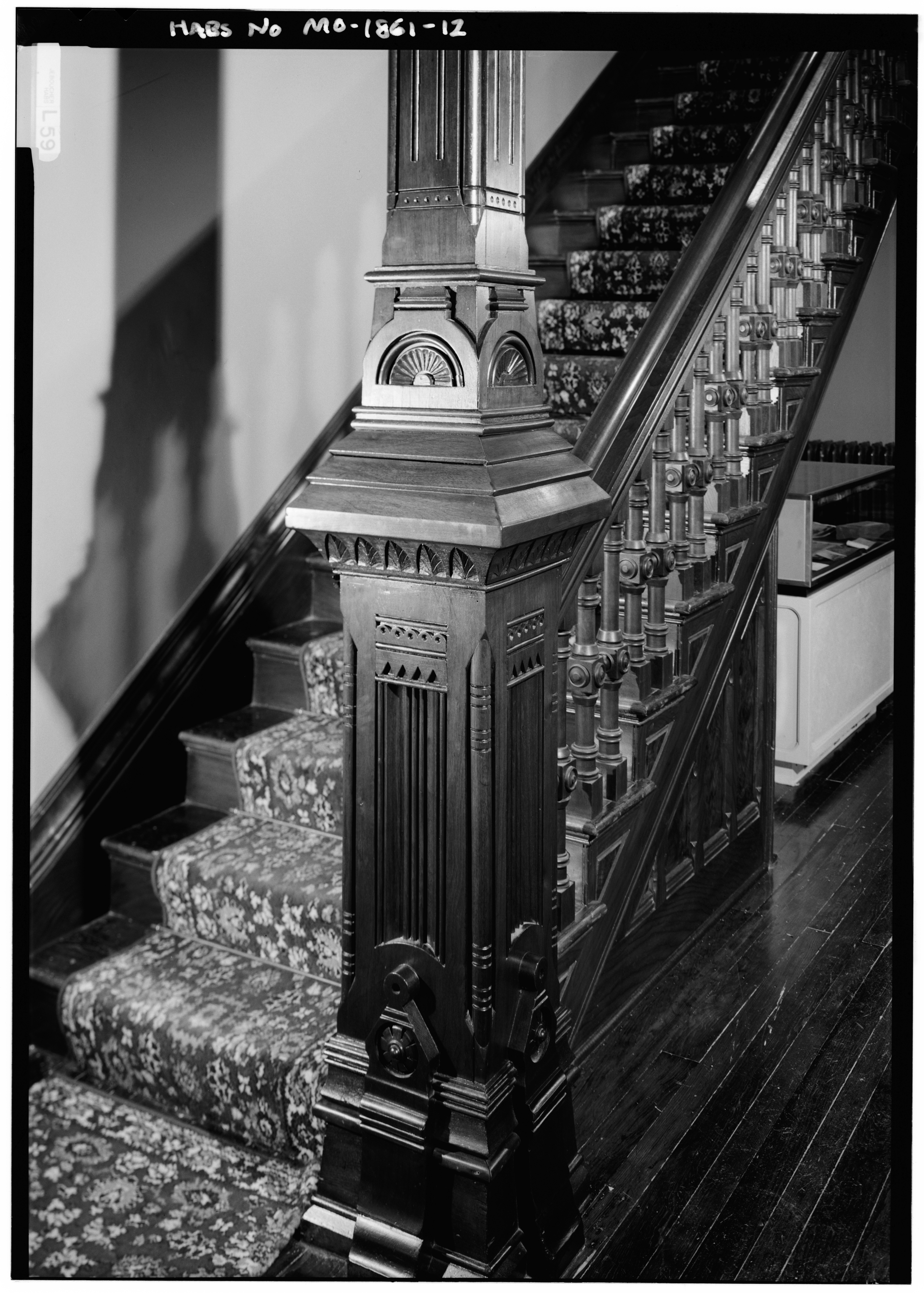
Detail of staircase, entrance hall
