= Wanda Brownlee Paige =

American educator and politician

Member of the Kansas House of Representatives from the 35th district
- Incumbent
- Assumed office 2024
- Preceded by: Marvin Robinson

Personal details
- Born: September 30, 1956 (age 69) Kansas City, Kansas, U.S.
- Party: Democratic
- Education: Simpson College

Wanda Brownlee Paige (born September 30, 1956) is an American educator and politician serving as a member of the Kansas House of Representatives for district 35. She was previously a school board member of the Kansas City, Kansas Public Schools.

== Early life and education ==
Wanda Kay Paige was born on September 30, 1956, in Kansas City, Kansas. She is the daughter of Eddie and Aser Lee Brownlee and has four brothers and four sisters. Paige attended Hawthorne Elementary School, Northwest Middle School, and Wyandotte High School, from which she graduated in 1974. Paige pursued higher education at Simpson College, earning a bachelor's degree in history and a master's degree in teaching social studies. She furthered her education by taking adult education courses at Drake University, and completing English as a Second Language (ESL) courses at Kansas State University.

== Career ==
Paige began her teaching career at Kansas City, Kansas Public Schools, where she served for 30 years before retiring in May 2012. Over the course of her career, she taught social studies at three middle schools: Argentine Middle School (24 years), Coronado Middle School (1 year), and Central Middle School (5 years). Her subject areas included World History, Geography, Kansas History, and American History.

In addition to her teaching responsibilities, Paige was involved in several extracurricular activities and initiatives. She tutored students before and after school, served as an advisor for the peer mentoring program, and coached basketball, track, and volleyball teams. She also sponsored cultural activities for Cinco de Mayo, Black History Month, Women's History Month, and Asian History Month. Paige actively participated in the Teacher's Social Committee and supported the school's book club. In January 2018, Paige was seated as a member of the Kansas City, Kansas School Board.

In September 2024, Paige was poised to be confirmed as the replacement for the 35th district representative Marvin Robinson. She secured the Democratic nomination by winning 49% of the vote in a competitive four-way primary, defeating the incumbent Robinson. She is expected to run unopposed in the upcoming November general election.

== Personal life ==
Paige is a member of Sigma Gamma Rho sorority, Heart of America Sisterhood, Inc., and Tabernacle Baptist Church.
