= Rosedale World War I Memorial Arch =

- U.S. National Register of Historic Places
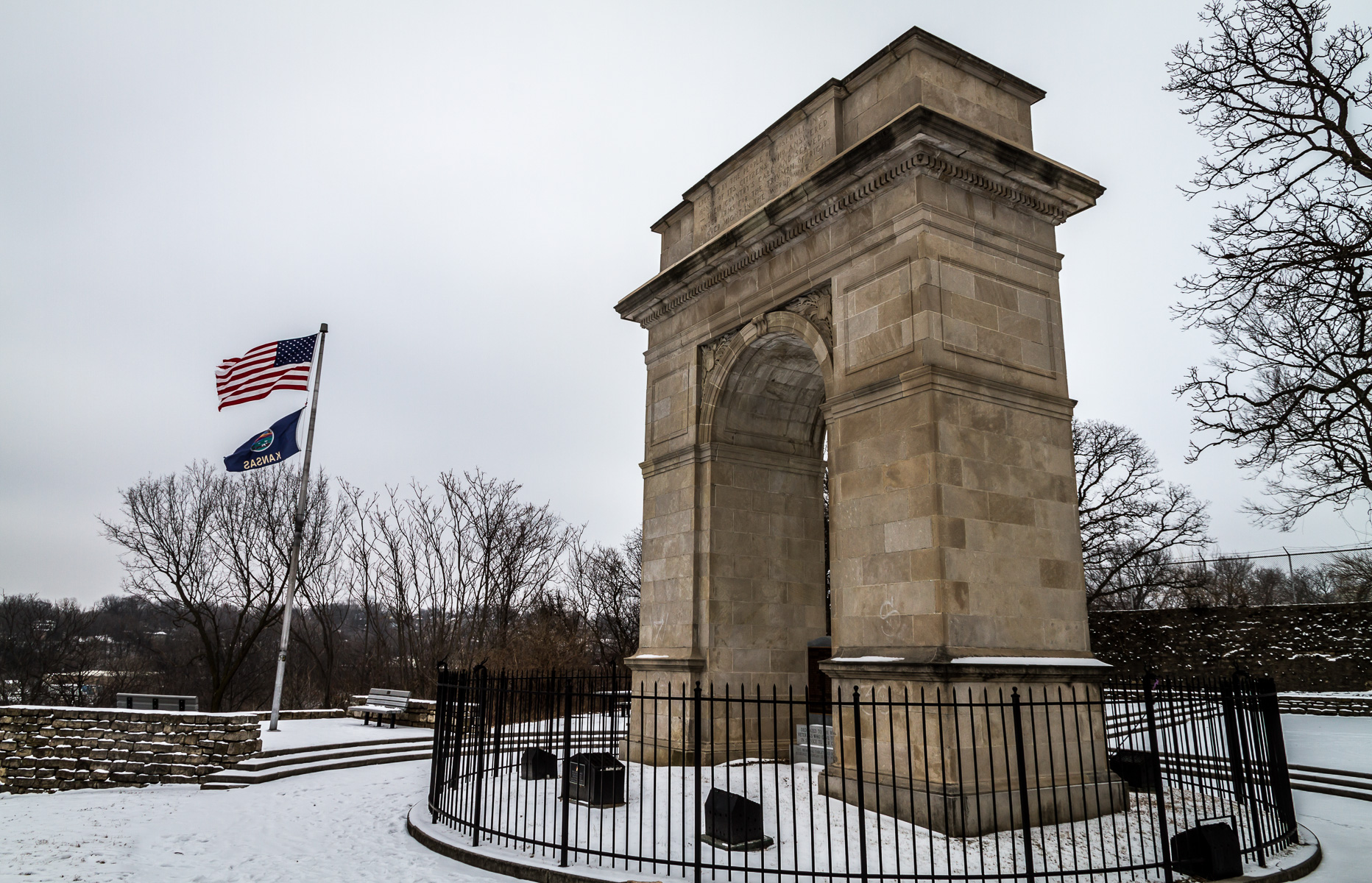
- Rosedale arch at the top of memorial drive
- Location: Kansas City, Kansas
- Coordinates: 39°3′50″N 94°36′53.7″W
- Built: 1923–24
- Architect: John Leroy Marshall
- NRHP reference No.: 77000599
- Added to NRHP: August 2, 1977

The Rosedale Arch is a monument dedicated in 1924 to the World War I veterans of Rosedale, a neighborhood district and former municipality on the southern edge of Kansas City, Kansas. The arch was designed by Rosedale resident John LeRoy Marshall, inspired by the Arc de Triomphe. The flood-lighted structure is located on Mount Marty, and is most easily visible at night from the intersection of Rainbow Boulevard and Southwest Boulevard. A historic marker was dedicated under the arch in 1993 to honor the soldiers of World War II, the Korean War, and the Vietnam War.

== History ==
The groundbreaking ceremony was on July 20, 1923, featuring French General Henri Gouraud. It was reportedly more impressive than the final opening ceremony.
