= Kansas City, Kansas Public Library =

Public library in Kansas, US

Coordinates: 39°06′54″N 94°37′30″W

Kansas City, Kansas Public Library (KCKPL)
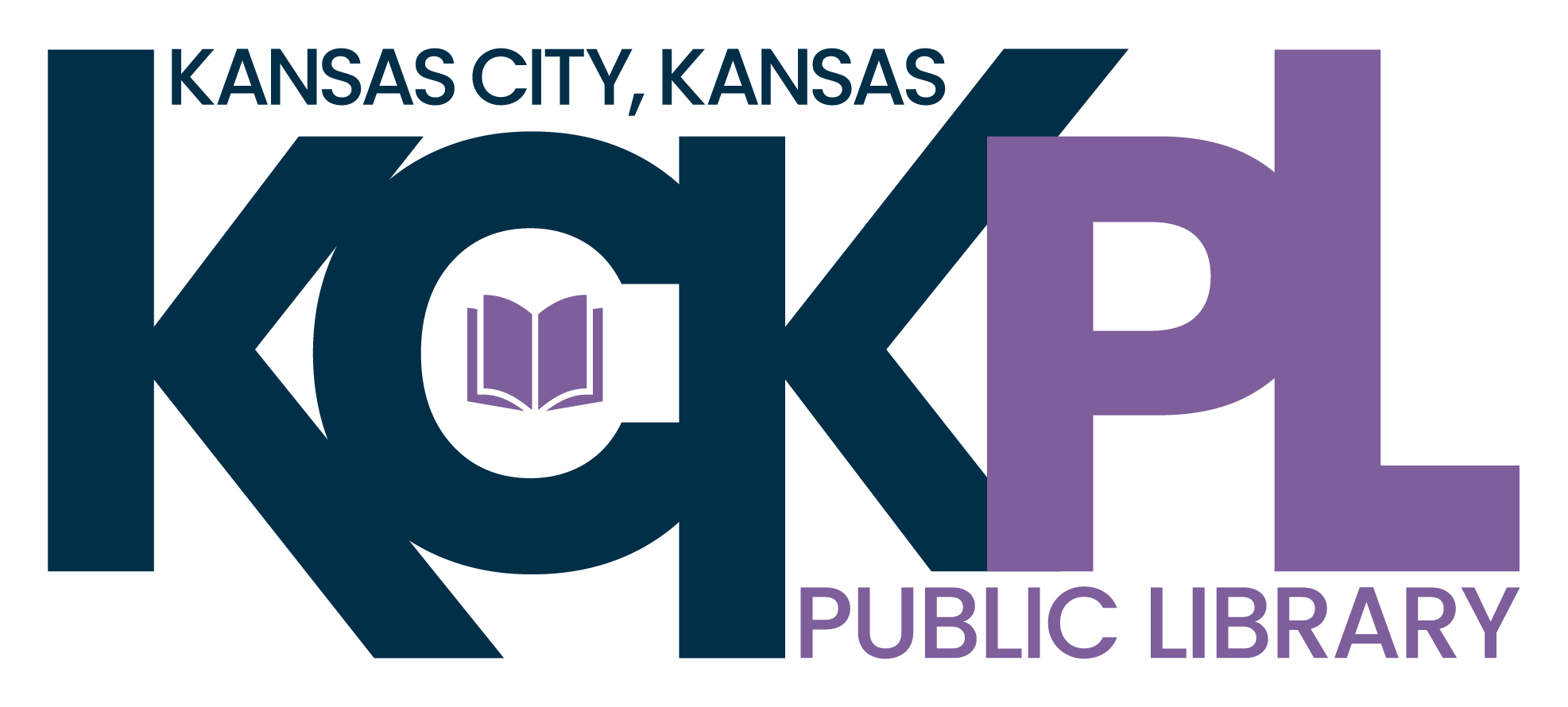
- Location: Kansas City, Kansas
- Established: 1893
- Branches: 5

Collection
- Size: 775,800

Access and use
- Circulation: 609,258
- Population served: 169,245

Other information
- Director: Laura Hunt Pellegrino
- Employees: 111
- Website: https://kckpl.org/

Kansas City, Kansas Public Library (KCKPL) is the public library system of Kansas City, Kansas, headquartered in the Main Library. The library serves Wyandotte County, Kansas. It is governed by the Board of Education of Kansas City Kansas Public Schools (Unified School District 500) and reports to the Wyandotte County Library Board

== Branches ==
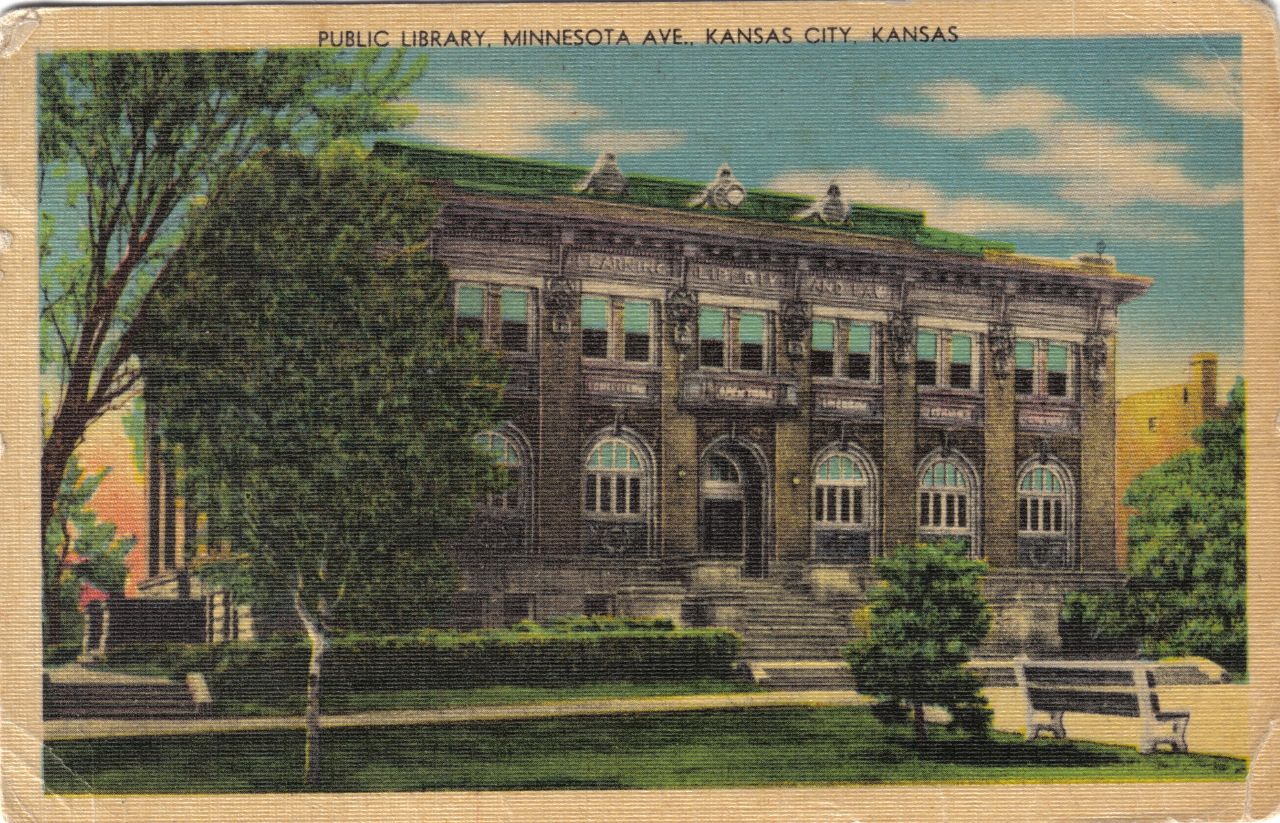
Postcard of the main library

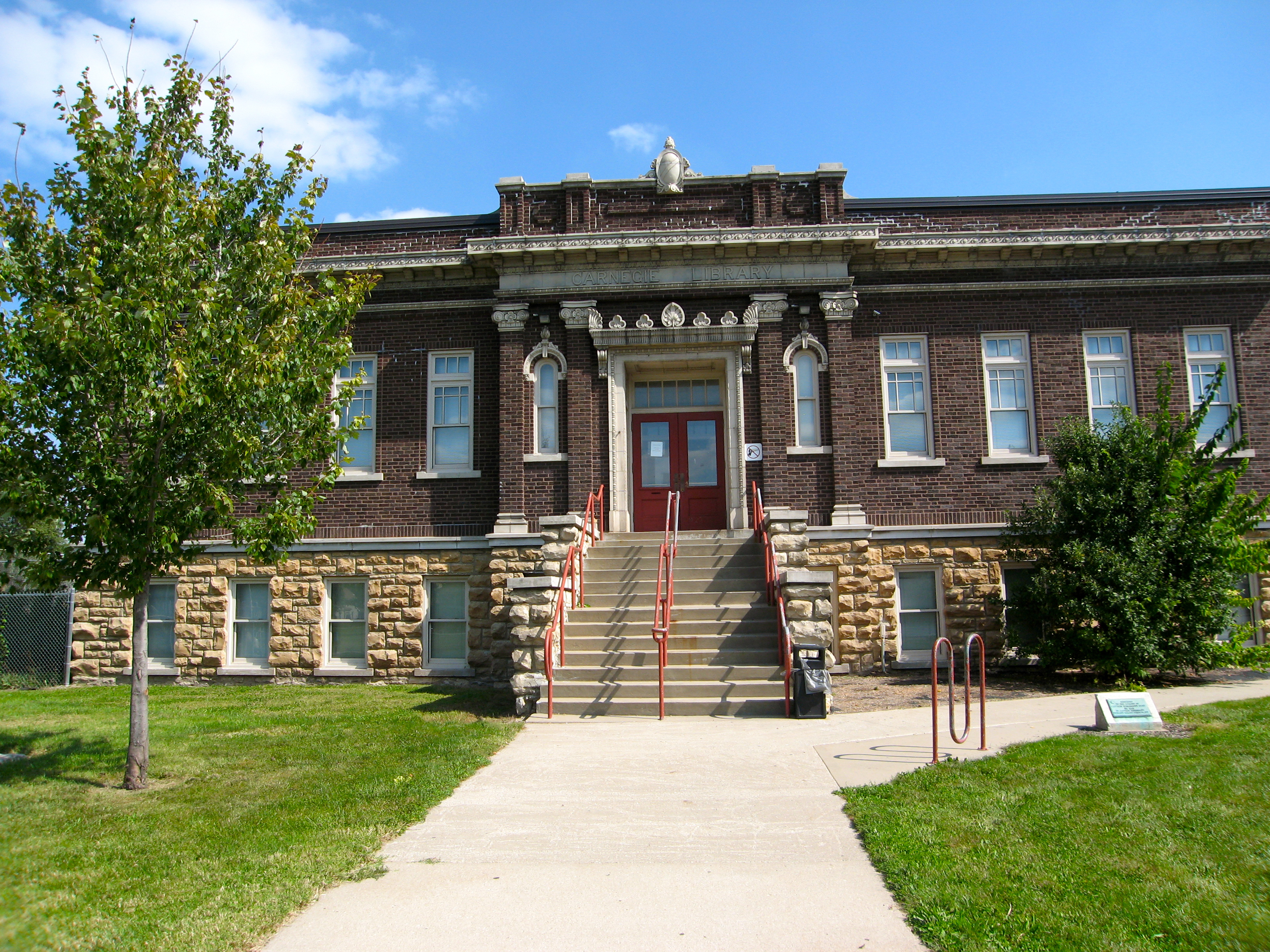
Argentine Carnegie Library in Argentine

The library system consists of five branches and three mobile libraries:

- Main Library
  - Located at 625 Minnesota Ave and opened March 23, 1966. This branch also includes the library administration and systemwide services departments. Main Library houses the Kansas Collection, a special collection of historical items that focuses on Wyandotte County and the state of Kansas.
- Mr. and Mrs. F.L. Schlagle Library
  - Located in Wyandotte County Lake Park and opened June 26, 2001. Mr. and Mrs. F.L. Schlagle Library is one of only two environmental learning centers in public libraries in the United States. It offers specialized programs and collections related to science and nature.
- South Branch Library
  - Located at 3104 Strong Ave in Argentine and it opened on September 26, 2012. South Branch Library provides Spanish language services to the library system, houses the system's largest collection of picture books, and offers a special collection of cake pans for checkout. It replaced the Argentine Carnegie Library. The name was chosen to reflect that it serves the entire southern region of the city and not a single neighborhood.
- Turner Community Library
  - Located inside Turner Recreation Commission Community Center and opened March 9, 2008. It was created through a partnership with Turner Unified School District 202.
- West Wyandotte Library
  - Located at 1737 N 82nd Street and opened June 1, 1986. West Wyandotte Library houses the Fine Arts Collection, a special collection of books about art history, artist biographies, museum collection guides, and art instruction.
- Mobile Libraries
  - The current Mobile Library service was launched in October 2014 with one library. Two more followed in November 2016. The Mobile Library Fleet serves locations around Wyandotte County.

== Awards ==
The Kansas City, Kansas Public Library has received numerous awards, including:

- Wyandotte County K-State Research and Extension 2022 Appreciation Award
- The Pitch Magazine's The Best of KC Best Library Branch: KS 2022
- The Pitch Magazine's The Best of KC Best Library Branch: KS 2021

== History ==
Kansas City, Kansas Public Library originated in 1855 when the Wyandotte Lyceum and Library Association was established to create a library in "Indian Country". Civil War veteran E.F. Heisler joined the effort in 1871 and established a small library in his office for a $1 fee. In 1873, the Wyandotte Library Association was formed to benefit this subscription library. As the library outgrew this space, it moved to the second floor of the Court Block building near 7th and Minnesota in 1893. The same year, the Board of Education began support and funding of the library. It took over governance of the library in 1899.

In 1897, Miss Elizabeth Dickinson served as the first librarian. That same year, Sarah Richart, a former teacher and president of the Federation of Clubs, proposed a tax on the dogs in the city to fund a new library and had herself appointed as the "dog enumerator". Upon her death in 1901, Richart left her estate to the city on the condition that the city dedicate a building to house a Free Public Library. Her donation, along with a $75,000 pledge from Andrew Carnegie, led to the construction of the Carnegie Library at Huron Place. It opened in 1904 under the direction of Mrs. Sarah Judd Greenman. The community embraced the new library, which featured a rose garden, fish pond, and museum. The building was adorned with carved heads of classic authors and poets and featured a life-size portrait of Mrs. Sarah Richart. In 1958 citizens recognized the need for a more modern library facility. A Bond Issue passed that year funding the library that is currently located at 625 Minnesota. The new facility opened in 1966 in a building that was shared with the Board of Education.

As the city grew, so did the library system. In 1910, the City of Argentine was annexed, and W. W. Thomas, through an agreement with local businesses, created a public library in a storefront with Miss Hazel Beeler was the first librarian. This new library soon became a branch of the Kansas City, Kansas Library, and in 1917 the city opened the Argentine Carnegie Library adjacent to Emerson Park. This facility survived the 1951 flood and, by the 1970s, housed the largest Spanish Language collection in the metro area. When the downtown Carnegie Library was demolished in 1958 to build the Main Library, it was the sole remaining Carnegie library in the city. In 1998, it was added to National Register of Historic Places.The building served as both the public library and the school library for Emerson Elementary school until 2012. In 2012 the current South Branch opened at a cost of $6 million, one third of which was acquired by the fundraisers of local residents. The school district agreed to pay for the rest if residents raised $1.5 million to $2 million. A former grocery store was demolished to make way for the current library, and the school district took possession of the former library.

Demand for library service in the western part of the city led to the creation, in 1963, of a small library at the old Horniff School at 98th and state. In 1971, the library moved to a storefront library in the Wyandotte Plaza shopping center under the direction of Pat Gaunce. The storefront became popular with families, and soon the community needed a larger facility. In 1986 the new West Wyandotte Library was opened, featuring art gallery space and a new home for the Fine Arts department.

The library system began offering mobile library services to residents throughout the county in 1964. Over the years, service was provided via various vehicles, from a converted bread truck to the current fleet of three mobile libraries.

In 2001, the library entered into a unique agreement with the Board of Education and Parks Department to create the Mr. & Mrs. F. L. Schlagle Library and Environmental Learning Center at Wyandotte County Lake. This facility offers visitors library materials on science and nature and houses a small menagerie of local animals. It offers programming for youth throughout the area, at the library facility, as well as area schools and organizations. This facility is one of only two such library environmental learning centers in the United States.

In collaboration with the Turner Recreation Commission, the Kansas City, KS School District 500, and the Wyandotte County Library Board, the library's newest branch was opened in the Turner Recreation Center in 2008. It provides full library services to patrons in the southwest part of our community.
