= Edmund Guerrier =

American interpreter

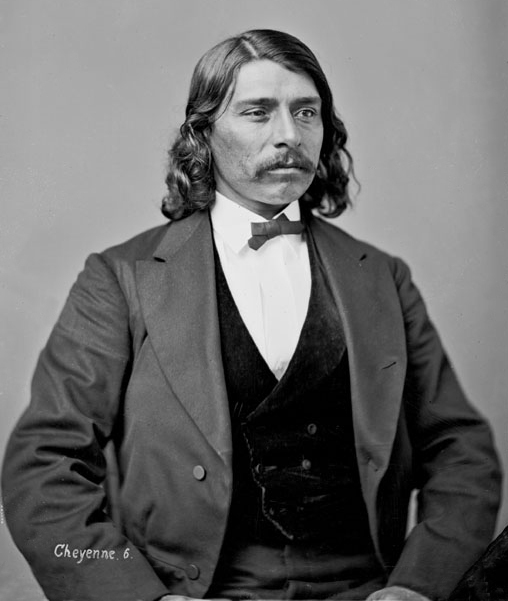
A portrait of Edmond Guerrier.

Edmund Gasseau Choteau Le Guerrier (16 January 1840 – 1 January 1921), of American and Cheyenne parentage, was a survivor of the Sand Creek massacre in 1864. He was an interpreter for the U.S. government during the Indian Wars between the Cheyenne and the United States and later became a successful rancher.

== Early life ==
Guerrier was born January 16, 1840, in a Cheyenne camp on the Smoky Hill River in what is now the state of Kansas. His father William Guerrier, an American of French descent born in 1812 in St. Louis, Missouri, was then employed by the fur trader William Bent of Bent's Fort; his mother was Tah-tah-tois-neh (Walks In Sight), a Cheyenne of Little Rock's Wutapai band. In 1848, his father left William Bent's employ and, in partnership with Seth Edmund Ward, became a licensed trader in the region of the Upper Platte and Arkansas rivers, eventually operating a trading post along the Platte with his partners.

Guerrier's mother and an infant sibling died in an 1849 cholera epidemic. In 1851 Guerrier was entered in a Catholic mission school near present-day St. Marys, Kansas, and later enrolled in St. Louis University. After his father's death in 1857, Guerrier withdrew from the university and eventually returned to live with his mother's people, who knew him as Red Tail Hawk. He narrowly escaped death in the Sand Creek massacre in 1864.

== Indian Wars ==
Guerrier married George Bent's sister Julia in about 1865. He worked as an interpreter for the Interior Department and was present in that capacity at the negotiations for the Treaty of the Little Arkansas of 1865. After a stint as a trader for licensed arms dealer David A. Butterfield, he was hired as an interpreter by the War Department, assigned to the Seventh U.S. Cavalry and played a crucial role during the spring 1867 Hancock expedition under Maj. Gen. Winfield S. Hancock. In August 1868 he was living with Little Rock's band on Buckner's Fork of the Pawnee River when he learned of the violent raids by a large war party on white settlements along the Saline and Solomon rivers in Kansas; he later gave an affidavit to the U.S. military identifying the men responsible for the raids.

In October 1867 he was an interpreter during negotiations for the Medicine Lodge Treaty. In 1869 he interpreted for the Fifth U.S. Cavalry under Maj. Gen. Eugene A. Carr, and afterward worked as a trader at Camp Supply for the firm of Lee and Reynolds. He again worked for the Interior Department in 1871 and 1884, interpreting for Cheyenne delegations to Washington, D.C.

== Death and legacy ==
Edmund Guerrier died in 1921 at his ranch near the city of Geary, Oklahoma, which was named after him; as Guerrier was difficult for non-French-speakers to pronounce or spell, it became Geary.
