= David Paulides =

Self-published writer on topics such as Bigfoot and missing persons

David Paulides is an American former police officer who is now an investigator and writer known primarily for his books dedicated to proving the reality of Bigfoot, and establishing the Missing 411 conspiracy theory. Missing 411 is a series of self-published books and films, which document cases of people who have gone missing in national parks and elsewhere, and assert that circumstances surrounding these cases are unusual and mysterious, although data analysis suggests that the disappearances themselves are not statistically significant or particularly unusual.

== Early life and career ==
Paulides has Greek ancestry. In his online biography page, Paulides states that he received his undergraduate and graduate degrees from the University of San Francisco, and in 1977 he began a 20-year career in law enforcement, transferring in 1980 to the San Jose Police Department, working in the patrol division on the SWAT Team, patrol, and Street Crimes Unit, and a variety of assignments in the detective division. While working as a court liaison officer in December 1996, Paulides was charged with a misdemeanor count of falsely soliciting for a charity.

== Investigations ==
After leaving the police force, Paulides wrote books on the topic of Bigfoot, as well as on the disappearances of people in national parks and elsewhere which he attributes to unspecified, unknown causes.

=== Bigfoot or Sasquatch ===
In his pursuit of Bigfoot, Paulides has published two Bigfoot-related books and founded the group North America Bigfoot Search, for which he serves as director.

Paulides has said North America Bigfoot Search was instrumental in the genesis of a paper published in 2013, which claimed that Bigfoot was real: "The world needs to understand that North America Bigfoot Search was the organizer of the study. We orchestrated the search that led to picking Melba S. Ketchum to conduct a study of bigfoot DNA." The resulting paper documented the analysis of 111 samples of hypothesized Bigfoot DNA and was written by 11 different authors. On November 24, 2012, DNA Diagnostics, a veterinary laboratory headed by Ketchum, issued a press release prior to peer review claiming that their DNA sequencing study confirmed the existence of a hominin hybrid cross between modern humans with an unknown primate. Two months later, in the inaugural issue of DeNovo: Journal of Science, the paper was analyzed by Sharon Hill of Doubtful News for the Committee for Skeptical Inquiry. Hill's report concluded that the paper was of poor quality, stating that "The few experienced geneticists who viewed the paper reported a dismal opinion of it, noting it made little sense."

The Scientist magazine also analyzed the paper, reporting that the analyses and data fail to support the claims of existence of a human-primate hybrid, but rather, "analyses either come back as 100 percent human, or fail in ways that suggest technical artifacts." The website for the DeNovo Journal of Science was set up on February 4, and there is no indication that Ketchum's work, the only study it has published, was peer reviewed.

=== Missing 411 ===
Following his work on Bigfoot, Paulides' next project was Missing 411, a series of self-published books and three documentary films, documenting unsolved cases of people who have gone missing in national parks and elsewhere.

According to Paulides, his work on this subject began when he was doing research in a national park and an (unnamed) off-duty park ranger approached him and expressed concern about the questionable nature of some of the missing person cases which occurred in the parks. The ranger knew Paulides' background and asked him to research the issue. Paulides obliged, and asserts that he uncovered multiple lines of evidence suggesting negligence on the part of the park service in failing to locate the missing people. He broadened his investigation to include missing people from around the world, and this led to his belief that he has uncovered a mysterious series of worldwide disappearances, which he said defied logical and conventional explanations.

As of August 2021, Paulides has written at least ten books on this topic. According to A Sobering Coincidence, he does not yet have a theory on what is causing the disappearances, although he says that the "field of suspects is narrowing." Paulides advised his readers to go outside of their normal comfort zone to determine who (or what) is the culprit.

Paulides' books publicized the fact that the US National Park Service does not keep an independent list of people that go missing in their parks. While there is a database for incident and criminal reports, it is not widely or consistently used and it does not interface with other criminal databases. In response, a petition was created to make the department accountable.

The interest in the book series prompted the creation of a documentary film based on the Missing 411 books; this film was released in 2016. Images of maps made by Paulides regarding his theory have been frequently shared on social media. The theory has also gone viral on TikTok.

Kyle Polich, a data scientist and host of the Data Skeptic podcast, documented his analysis of Paulides' claims in the article "Missing411" and presented his analysis to a SkeptiCamp held in 2017 by the Monterey County Skeptics. He concluded that the allegedly unusual disappearances represent nothing unusual at all, and are instead best explained by non-mysterious causes such as falling or sudden health crises leading to a lone person becoming immobilized off-trail, drowning, bear (or other animal) attack, environmental exposure, or even deliberate disappearance. After analyzing the missing person data, Polich concluded that these cases are not "outside the frequency that one would expect, or that there is anything unexplainable that I was able to identify." This presentation was discussed in a February 2017 article in Skeptical Inquirer, a publication of the CSI. In the article, Susan Gerbic reported "Paulides ... gave no reason for these disappearances but finds odd correlations for them. For example, two women missing in different years both had names starting with an 'A' with three-letters, Amy and Ann." Polich concluded in his analysis: "I've exhausted my exploration for anything genuinely unusual. After careful review, to me, not a single case stands out nor do the frequencies involved seem outside of expectations."

== Books ==
=== Bigfoot ===
- Hoopa Project: Bigfoot Encounters (2008) (ISBN 978-0-88839-653-2)
- Tribal Bigfoot (2009) (ISBN 978-0-88839-687-7)

=== Missing 411 series ===
- Missing 411 – Eastern United States: Unexplained Disappearances of North Americans That Have Never Been Solved (2012) ISBN 978-1-4680-1262-0
- Missing 411 – Western United States & Canada: Unexplained Disappearances of North Americans that have never been solved (2012) ISBN 978-1-4662-1629-7
- Missing 411 – North America and Beyond (2013) ISBN 978-1-4802-3762-9
- Missing 411 – The Devil's in the Details (2014) ISBN 978-1-4952-4642-5
- Missing 411 – A Sobering Coincidence (2015) ISBN 978-1-5118-8566-9
- Missing 411 – Hunters (2016) ISBN 978-1-5309-4637-2
- Missing 411 – Off the Grid (2017) ISBN 978-1-5448-2508-3
- Missing 411 – Law (2018) ISBN 978-0-692-17644-3
- Missing 411 – Canada (2019) ISBN 978-1-79232-265-5
- Missing 411 – Montana (2020) ISBN 978-0-578-78927-9

== Documentaries ==
- Missing 411 (2017)
- Missing 411: The Hunted (2019)
- Missing 411: The UFO Connection (2022)
- American Sasquatch: Man, Myth or Monster (2025)
- Missing 411: National Parks – Washington State (2026)
