= Sauer Castle =

Historical property

- U.S. National Register of Historic Places
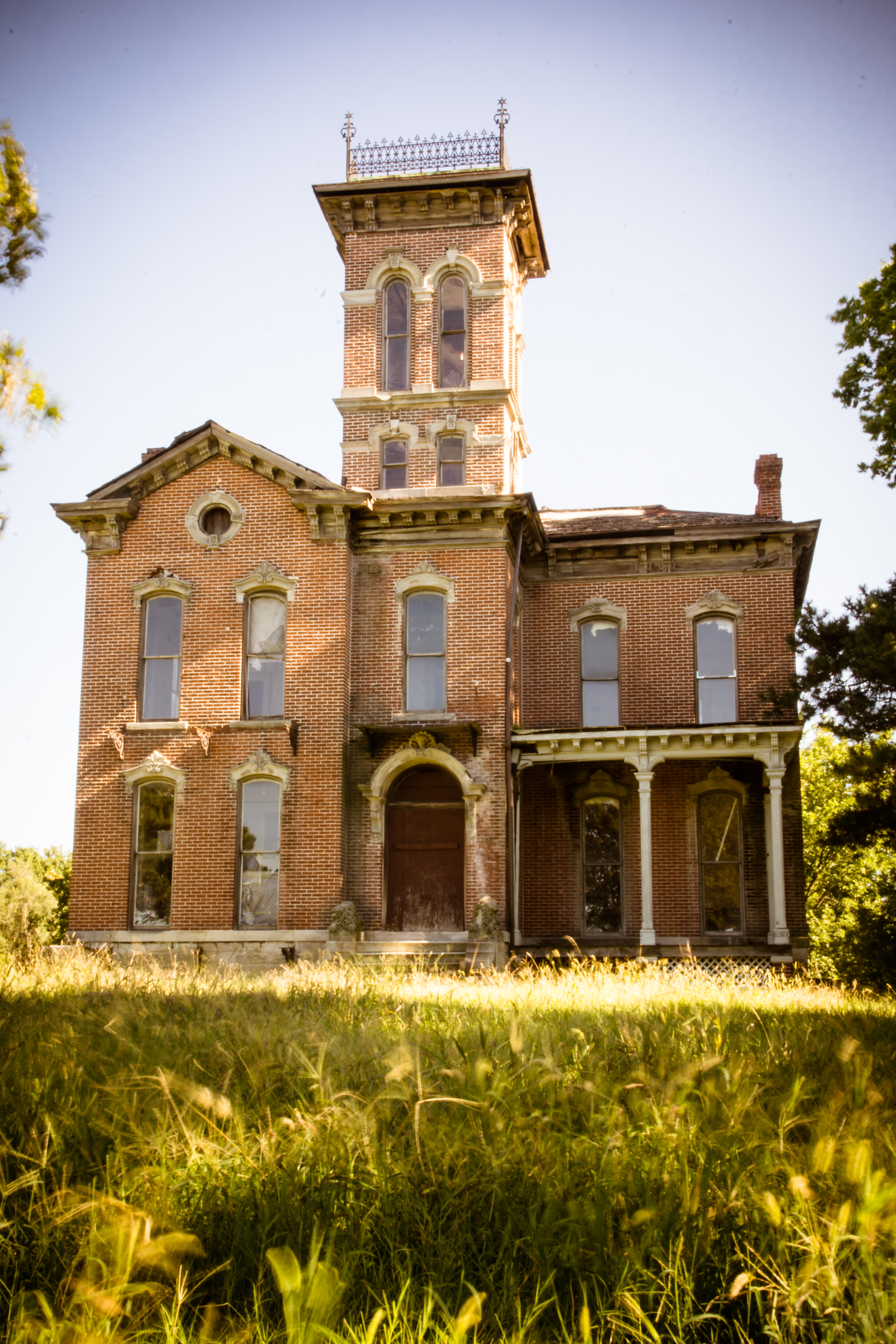
- Sauer Castle in 2013
- Location: Kansas City, Kansas
- Coordinates: 39°4′6.56″N 94°38′2.32″W
- Built: 1871; 155 years ago
- Architectural style: Italianate
- Website: sauercastle.com
- NRHP reference No.: 77000600
- Added to NRHP: August 2, 1977

Sauer Castle is an Italianate architecture home at 935 Shawnee Road in Kansas City, Kansas, built from 1871 to 1873. It was designed by famed architect Asa Beebe Cross as the residence of German immigrant and local business owner Anton Sauer. He had married Francesca in Vienna, Austria, at age 18. There, they had their five children: Gustave O.L., Anthony Philip Jr., Julius J., Emil, and Johanna.

The house is on the National Register of Historic Places. A Kansas City, Kansas Public Library historian called it, "Without a doubt, the most famous residence in Kansas City, Kansas".

== History ==
Anton Sauer was born in Germany in 1823, and moved to New York City in 1858 to join his mother and sisters. However, due to his worsening tuberculosis and the death of his wife, Francesca, in 1868, he moved his family to Kansas City.

After Anton's business became successful, he began courting a young 28-year-old widow, Mary (Maria) Einhellig Messerschmidt, who had two daughters of her own: Anna and Maria. After marrying in 1869 they had five daughters (four survived to maturity): Eva Marie, Antoinette, Josephine (sometimes listed as Fosefa), and Clara. Daughter Helen (sometimes listed as Frances) died in infancy age 14 months.

By 1872, the mansion was finally fully furnished, sitting on the Shawnee trail that led to the historical Santa Fe Trail.

On August 16, 1879, Anton died in the second floor master bedroom. Mary and the children remained in the house. She died on November 29, 1919, of a heart attack, and the children remained.

Daughter Eve Maria Sauer married William C. Van Fossen in the house, having one child named Helen before the marriage failed 18 months into it. She then married a widower with six children of his own, local Wyandotte County businessman and landowner, Mr. John S. Perkins. Together they had three children and stayed married until he committed suicide with a handgun at age 73, due to his declining health. Eve and John S. Perkins's son John Harrison Perkins had an infant daughter drown in the swimming pool on the west side of the house. Eve continued to live in the family home with her son and two daughters, Eva Marie Perkins, and Marguerite A. Perkins, until her death in 1955.

Five generations of the Sauer family continued living in the mansion until the owner of a home heating oil company, Paul Berry, bought the house after Eve's death. He lived in the mansion until his own death in December 1986. Because of ghost stories originating in 1930, the house was constantly trespassed and vandalized, which Barry and his dog fought off.

In January 1987, Bud Wyman, his son and daughter in law, Cliff and Cindy Jones, bought the home hoping to turn it into a bed and breakfast. At this time, no one lived in the house. In 1988, Carl Lopp, the great, great grandson of Anthony Sauer, bought the house with the intention of fixing it up and residing there to keep it in the family. However, this difficult task has only yielded minor improvements such as fixing balconies and putting a large fence around the property.

Lopp's hired caretaker of the house was charged with felony theft on August 15, 1996, for stealing $30,000 worth of artifacts from the house, including a garden tractor, antique dress, chandelier, copper from the furnace, and wall sconces.

In January 2022, Lopp listed the property for $10 million, considered far above its true market value.

=== Restoration ===
The site was purchased in 2023 by an enthusiast who hired teams of comprehensive historical restoration specialists. Their goals were structural stability and restoration of original architectural features, using modern techniques such as foundation stabilization and roof repair. They used period-appropriate materials and methods where possible, especially on stonework.

== Architecture ==
Asa Beebe Cross was one of the most prominent Kansas City architects, and designed Sauer Castle in the Italianate Villa architecture style. This typically focuses on classical proportions, decorative brackets, and tall, narrow windows. The house's reportedly most distinctive feature is its four-story tower, providing panoramic views.

It was placed in the Register of Historic Kansas Places on July 1, 1977. It was placed in the National Register of Historic Places on August 2, 1977. It was placed in the Kansas City, Kansas Historic Landmarks on January 29, 1987.
