= Sumner Academy of Arts & Science =

Sumner Academy of Arts and Science

Location
- 1610 N. 8th St. Kansas City, Kansas 66101; United States; 39°07′18″N 94°37′48″W

Information
- School type: Public, High School
- Established: 1978 (Sumner Academy); 1905 (Sumner High School)
- School district: Kansas City USD 500
- CEEB code: 171550
- Principal: Rick Malone
- Grades: 8 to 12
- Gender: Co-educational
- Enrollment: 873 (2024-2025)
- Campus type: Urban
- Colors: Royal Blue; Silver
- Athletics: Class 5A; District 1
- Athletics conference: Meadowlark Conference
- Sports: Basketball, baseball, football, soccer, tennis, bowling, softball, volleyball, swimming, wrestling
- Mascot: Sabres
- Team name: Sabres, Lady Sabres
- Accreditation: Blue Ribbon 1984 and 2003.
- Newspaper: The Academician
- Yearbook: Excalibur
- Website: School Website

Sumner Academy of Arts and Science is a magnet school in Kansas City, Kansas and is operated by the Kansas City USD 500 school district. Named for abolitionist Charles Sumner, it started in 1905 during a period of racial tension as a segregated school for black ("Negro") students, which offered vocational training, but emphasized college-preparatory training. Located at 1610 N. 8th Street, the current architecturally significant complex began with its Art Deco core in 1937, but has been repeatedly expanded. The segregated Sumner High School closed in 1978, converting at that time to its present high-challenge magnet program. Formerly known as the Charles Sumner School, Charles Sumner High School, and the Charles Sumner Academy.

== History ==
=== Racial tensions leading to new high school ===
Sumner's origins can be traced to a death in a racially charged environment. On April 12, 1904, Roy Martin, a white student at Kansas City, Kansas High School was shot and killed at Kerr Park. An African American named Louis Gregory was accused and arrested. The night of his arrest, a lynch mob gathered, and a group of African American citizens prevented the mob from breaking into the jail to take Gregory from custody. Gregory was subsequently convicted of first degree murder.

The morning after the shooting, all African American students were blocked from entering the high schools by white students and white citizens. Many whites agitated for segregated schools. For some time, white students attended classes at Kansas City Kansas High School in the morning, while black students attended in the afternoon. In this desperate situation, some African American and white citizens eventually decided to petition the Kansas legislature to change the law prohibiting segregated high schools, requesting an allowance for a segregated high school in Kansas City, Kansas. On February 22, 1905, the Kansas Legislature passed such a bill, which was reluctantly signed by the governor.

=== School opening and relocation ===
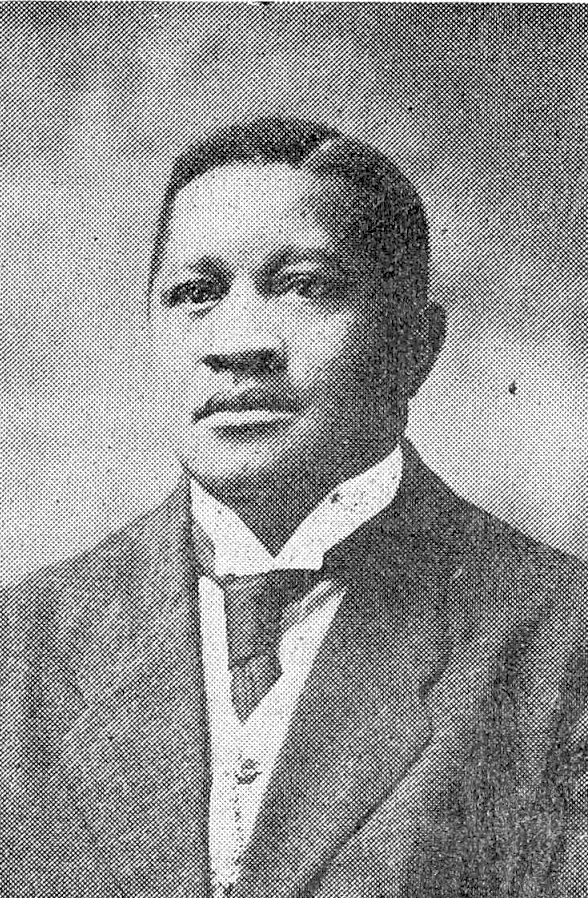
J. Silas Harris, 1909 principal

In 1905 Sumner high school opened, the first de jure segregated high school in the state of Kansas. Students moved from the old Kansas City High School and the old Central High School in Kansas City.

The original school was named Manual Training High School and built at the corner of 9th and Washington Boulevard. After objections to that name from the black community, the name of Sumner was chosen instead to honor Charles Sumner (1811–1884), a member of the United States Senate from 1851 to 1874. Charles Sumner had been very strong abolitionist and a leader of the Radical Republicans who had fought for the rights of the black people during Reconstruction.

In 1909, the school principal was J. Silas Harris, who also led the National Negro Education Council.

In 1932, a small plot on northwest corner of 8th and Oakland was purchased which now houses the current Sumner Academy. The current complex of buildings began in 1937.

=== School closing and reopening ===
In 1978 Sumner High School was officially closed as Sumner High School. Students were reassigned as part of court-ordered desegregation mandating busing for African-American students to new schools, and giving all district students the option of whether or not to attend the new school. It was reopened as 'Sumner Academy of Arts and Sciences', a magnet school for highly-motivated and academically talented students.

In 2003, Sumner won a prestigious national award – Sumner Academy received the U.S. Department of Education's NCLB – Blue Ribbon Schools Award for its scores on the Kansas state assessments, making it just one of four schools in Kansas to earn the distinction. In 2004, Sumner received a "Great IDEAS" grant (funded/sponsored by the Ewing Marion Kauffman Fund) for the 2004–05 school year, which encourages teachers in SLC (Small Learning Communities) to work together to develop innovative programs and projects to improve student learning. In the summer of 2005 (July 20–24), Sumner High School, later Sumner Academy of Arts & Science, celebrated its 100th anniversary since students first walked through the doors at 9th and Washington Boulevard.

== Academics ==
Sumner Academy maintains high behavioral and academic standards for its students. Students must receive a letter of acceptance before enrolling at Sumner Academy and are evaluated based on academic criteria, assessment criteria, and attendance and behavior criteria. Once enrolled, students are required to maintain GPA of 2.5 or higher to continue attendance.

The school was selected as a Blue Ribbon School in 1984 and 2003. The Blue Ribbon Award recognizes public and private schools which perform at high levels or have made significant academic improvements. One factor responsible for Sumner Academy's rigorous academic standing is its participation in the International Baccalaureate (IB) Program which is based on a 5.0 scale. Sumner began offering students the opportunity to participate in the IB program in 1987. The academy offers 20 different IB classes and over one-third of the faculty have received extensive IB training. Although only juniors and seniors are eligible to take IB classes, the effect of the IB program permeates the Sumner Academy curriculum at all grade levels. Ninth and tenth graders often take pre-IB courses with the anticipation of enrolling in future IB work. Students have the opportunity to take International Baccalaureate coursework and exams. The IB participation rate at Sumner Academy of Arts & Science is 97 percent. The student body makeup is 41 percent male and 59 percent female, and the total minority enrollment is 79 percent. Sumner Academy of Arts & Science is 1 of 6 high schools in the Kansas City.

== Extracurricular activities ==
The Sabres and Lady Sabres compete in the 5A classification, according to the Kansas State High School Activities Association (KSHSAA).

=== Football ===
In November 2008, the Sumner Academy football team made it to the Kansas State playoffs for the first time in a decade. In 2010, Sumner Academy recorded its best record in school history at 9–2, as it made the Kansas State playoffs for the second consecutive time and won the Kansas City, Kansas League Championship for the first time in 20 years. In 2009, Sumner Academy won back to back KCK League Championship titles, appeared in the Kansas State playoffs, and finished with a record of 6–4.

=== Wrestling ===
In February 2008, Sumner Academy senior wrestlers Jerry Cox and Malcolm Sharp placed at state. In 2009, the wrestling team was recognized as league champions. In 2014, the wrestling team was recognized as league champions. In 2014, Sumner Academy senior wrestler Donte Boose won 4A 126lb state championship. In 2015, Sumner Academy junior wrestler Emmanuel Browne won 4A 120lb state championship. Next year in February 2016, senior wrestler Emmanuel Browne won back to back 4A 126lb state championships.

=== Bowling ===
The Lady Sabres bowling team won both the 2007 and 2008 4A girls bowling state championships. In 2008, Sarah Ottens won the 2008 5A girls bowling individual state champion. In 2009, Christian Smith was recognized as the 5A state boys individual bowling champion.

=== Scholars Bowl ===
Sumner Academy won the 2003 Class 5A Scholars Bowl state championship.

=== Boys' Basketball ===
Sumner High School won the 1969 4A Kansas State High School Activities Association boys basketball championship.

Sumner Academy has won four Kansas State High School Activities Association boys basketball championships, which were in 1998, 2000, 2010, and 2011.

=== Competitive Speech and Debate ===
The Sumner Academy Competitive Speech team (Forensics) has won 12 KSHSAA state championships. They won the 4A Speech state championships in 1998, 2012, 2013, 2014, 2015, 2016, and 5A Speech state championships in 2017, 2019, 2021, 2022, 2023, and 2024. The Sumner Forensics team also added a KSHSAA 4A Debate championship in 2015 and placed 2nd in the Class 5A State Debate Championship tournament in both 2024 and 2025.

=== Track and Field ===
The Sumner High School boys track & field team won the 4A outdoor team Kansas State High School State Championship in 1975, 1976, and 1977 and indoor in 1969 and 1970.

The Sumner Academy boys track & field team won back to back KSHSAA 4A team championships in 1998 & 1999.

== Architecture ==
=== Original Art Deco building ===
By 1937 Sumner had outgrown its previous facilities at Ninth and Washington and was using every inch of available space for classes. That year the federal Works Progress Administration deemed Sumner eligible for a New Deal grant to construct a new building, eventually providing $378,000 for building and equipment. The school board selected Joseph W. Radotinsky of Kansas City to be the architect, and in 1938 issued $751,000 in bonds. The building was built 1938–1939 and dedicated in January 1940, with classes beginning January 2.

Radotinsky's design features the Art Deco style in vogue at the time for federally sponsored public works. The most striking element is the central streamlined entrance tower, which provides visual focus while housing the heating units, air intake chambers and associated filters. The exterior consists of an articulated pattern of two tones of fire-clay brick accented by limestone trim. The growing impact of European modernism can be seen in the massing of the structure; David H. Sachs and George Ehrlich particularly cite the influence of Willem Marinus Dudok, a Dutch architect best known for the Hilversum City Hall (Raadhuis, 1931). In turn, Dudok had borrowed extensively from Frank Lloyd Wright and the Prairie School, particularly in terms of brickwork and the massing of geometric forms.

=== Subsequent expansion ===
There have been a number of expansions to the campus complex since this original elegant building was erected:

- In 1964 the field house athletic field added.
- In 1975 the new gymnasium, cafeteria and student center were added.
- In 1978, when the school was officially closed as Sumner High School, there were extensive renovation of classrooms, library and science rooms.
- In 1985, the library was expanded, although the Sumner Courtyard decreased in size in order for the academic expansion of the student population.
- In 2002, voters approved a proposed $120 million bond issue at the Municipal Election Tuesday (April 3, 2001) to air-condition schools, improve technology, and make other upgrades to schools and public libraries. Sumner was part of Phase II, which was completed in the summer of 2002.
- In 2005, Sumner was named to the National Register of Historic Places and the Register of Historic Kansas Places.

=== West wing ===
In 2010, a new wing was added to include all new technology. The addition was built over the west parking lot, and replaced the old temporary classroom units. The rooms are spacious, with carpeted floors, and can hold up to 40 student desks. The west wing also has new lockers and bathrooms and is equipped with some of the very latest in classroom technology.

== Notable alumni ==
- William Foster, Former Member of the National Council of Arts, President of the American Bandmasters Association, Director of the Marching 100 at Florida A&M University, National Association for Distinguished Band Conductors Hall of Fame Inductee, and board member of the John Philip Sousa Foundation
- Fernando J. Gaitan Jr., (class of 1966), senior United States district judge of the United States District Court for the Western District of Missouri
- Paul Graham (class of 1969) former head basketball coach at Washington State Cougars men's basketball
- Leonard Gray (Class of 1969), former NBA player for the Seattle SuperSonics
- Lea Hopkins (Class of 1962), LGBT rights activist
- Harold Hunter (Class of 1944), first African American to sign a contract with a National Basketball Association (NBA) team
- Carmell Jones, (class of 1954), jazz trumpet player
- Delano Lewis, (class of 1956), attorney, businessman, diplomat, and United States Ambassador to South Africa from 1999 to 2001
- John McClendon, first African American head coach in any professional sport and enshrined in the Naismith Basketball Hall of Fame and National Collegiate Basketball Hall of Fame
- Charles Wilber "Bullet" Rogan (Class of 1908), pitcher, hitter, and later manager for the Kansas City Monarchs, inductee to the Baseball Hall of Fame

== See also ==
- List of high schools in Kansas
- History of African Americans in Kansas
