= Kansas City, Kansas Public Schools =

Public school district in Kansas City, Kansas

Kansas City USD 500

Address
- 2010 N. 59th St. Kansas City, Kansas, 66104; United States
- Coordinates: 39°07′48″N 94°43′01″W

District information
- Type: Public
- Motto: Every Grownup, Every Child, Every Day
- Grades: PreK to 12
- Established: May 10, 1886; 139 years ago
- Superintendent: Anna Stubblefield
- School board: 7 members
- Schools: 44
- Budget: $428,729,878
- NCES District ID: 2007950

Students and staff
- Students: 21,000 (2023)
- Staff: 1,500
- Student–teacher ratio: 13.94

Other information
- Website: kckschools.org

Kansas City USD 500, also known as Kansas City Kansas Public Schools, is a public unified school district in Kansas City, Kansas, United States. It is the fifth largest public school system in Kansas in terms of student enrollment. It is considered a medium-sized district in the United States. As of 2023, the district has approximately 21,000 students enrolled in grades PreK & K-12. The district currently operates 5 high schools, 7 middle schools, 29 elementary schools, and 4 alternative schools, along with a number of additional educational and support facilities. The school district's 2024–2025 school year budget was $428,729,878.

The district is also the only one in the nation to fully equip all of its buildings with SafeDefend an electronic alerting system that allows officials and staff to quickly respond to a crisis. At the touch of a button, it notifies law enforcement and first responders while activating lockdown features.

KCKPS has its own police force, the Kansas City Kansas Public Schools Police Department (KCKPSPD), which was established in 2014 to provide police services for the school district.

In 2022, Kansas City, Kansas Public Schools (KCKPS) faced backlash over a proposal to spend nearly $6.8 million in federal COVID relief funds on cameras in classrooms. District officials argued the cameras would help address staff shortages by livestreaming and recording lessons for classrooms with long-term substitutes or unqualified teachers. However, the proposal drew strong opposition from parents, students, and teachers, who feared it would reduce in-person learning with qualified educators and create an intrusive surveillance environment. Teachers worried that relying on video lessons could harm student progress. Additionally, KCKPS continues to struggle with staffing issues, particularly in special education, which has contributed to ongoing concerns about trust.

== Governance ==
Kansas City Kansas Public Schools is led by a Board of Education made up of seven members. This board chooses a superintendent who manages the district’s daily activities. Board members are chosen directly by the people through elections. Also, it controls the Kansas City, Kansas Public Library.

=== Members ===
Leaders

Position	Name	Since
Superintendent	Anna Stubblefield	2021
Board President	Randy Lopez	2024
Board Vice President	Wanda Kay Paige	2026

== Schools ==
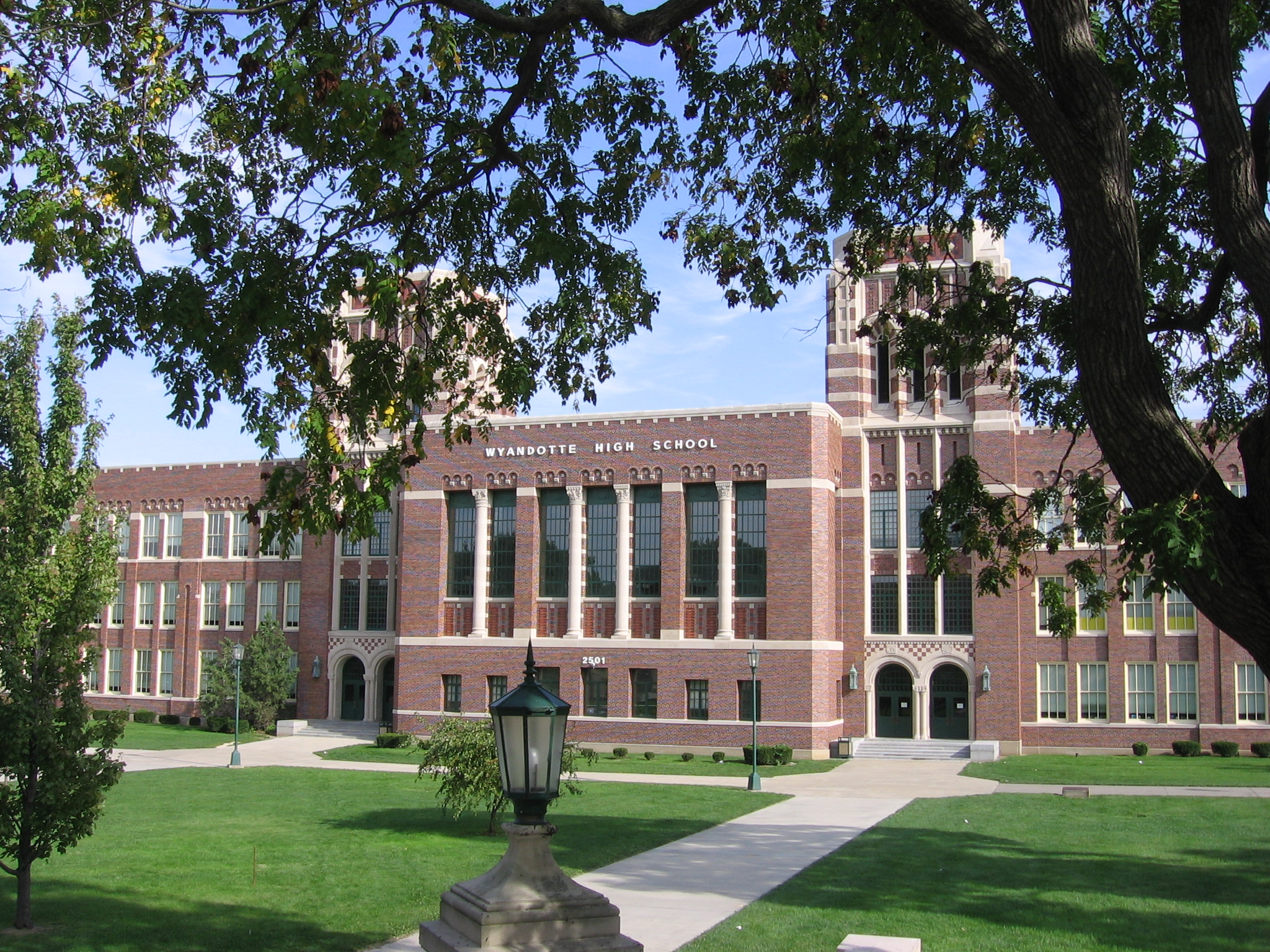
Wyandotte High School

Schools	#
High Schools	5
Middle Schools	7
Elementary	29

High schools:

- J. C. Harmon High School
- F. L. Schlagle High School
- Washington High School
- Wyandotte High School

Grades 8-12:

- Sumner Academy of Arts & Science

Middle Schools

- Argentine
- Arrowhead
- Carl B. Bruce
- Central
- Eisenhower
- Rosedale
- Gloria Willis

Elementary Schools

- Banneker
- Bertram Caruthers (Previously Hawthorne)
- Lowell Brune
- Central
- Douglass
- T. A. Edison
- Emerson
- John Fiske
- Grant
- Hazel Grove
- Claude Huyck
- John F. Kennedy
- Lindbergh
- McKinley
- New Chelsea
- New Stanley
- Noble Prentis
- M. E. Pearson
- Quindaro
- Frank Rushton
- Silver City
- Stony Point North
- Stony Point South
- Mark Twain
- Eugene Ware
- Welborn
- West Park
- Whittier
- Frances Willard

Preschools

- KCK Early Childhood Center
- Earl Watson, Jr. Early Childhood Center
- Morse Early Childhood Center
- North Central Office Early Childhood Center

Alternative

- Alfred Fairfax Academy
- Bridges Wyandotte Academy
- Juvenile Services Center
- KVC Academy

== Programs ==
=== Diploma+ ===
In 2014, the district introduced a new initiative called Diploma+. This program aims to ensure that every student graduates not only with a high school diploma but also with one of seven endorsements. These endorsements are designed to equip students with the skills and experiences they need for success in both higher education and careers in a global workforce.

The seven possible endorsements for Diploma+ are:

Achieving a minimum score of 21 on the ACT or 1060 on the SAT. Completing a qualified internship or an industry-approved project. Earning the International Baccalaureate (IB) Diploma or completing the IB Career-Related Programme. Obtaining an industry-recognized certificate or credential. Gaining acceptance into the military. Completing at least one full year of college (18-30 credit hours). Developing an approved post-secondary transition plan. The Diploma+ initiative is part of a long-term effort to transform teaching and learning within KCKPS. It continues to be an integral part of the district’s curriculum today, reflecting a commitment to preparing students for success in both college and careers.

== Demographics ==
Historical population
Year	Student Enrollment	Percent change
2022	22,000	—
2023	21,000	−4.5%

As of the 2022-2023 school year, in its enrollment breakdown by ethnic group, 58.7% of its students were of Hispanic origin, of any race; 8.2% of the student population was of Non-Hispanic white ancestry; 29.9% of its students were African American, while Asian American students comprised 6.8%, and Native Americans and Pacific Islanders together comprised less than 1%.

== See also ==
- Kansas State Department of Education
- Kansas State High School Activities Association
- List of high schools in Kansas
- List of unified school districts in Kansas
