= List of people from Kansas City, Kansas =

The list of people from Kansas City, Kansas includes those who were born in or have lived in the city. People from the Missouri side should not be included and should be instead listed at List of people from Kansas City, Missouri unless they've lived on both sides of the state line.

== Academia ==
- June Helm (1924–2004), anthropologist
- John E. Hodge (1914–1996), chemist
- Bart Kosko (1960– ), engineering professor, writer
- Richard Rhodes (1937– ), historian
- Frederic Wakeman (1937–2006), historian, China scholar

== Arts and entertainment ==
=== Film, television, and theater ===
- S. Torriano Berry (1958– ), film director
- Trai Byers (1983– ), actor
- Webster Campbell (1893–1972), actor, director, screenwriter
- Al Christy (1918–1995), actor, TV announcer
- Earl Cole (1971– ), TV show host, media personality, winner of Survivor: Fiji
- Daniel L. Fapp (1904–1986), cinematographer (West Side Story)
- Scott Foley (1972– ), actor (Scrubs, Dawson's Creek, House, and Grey's Anatomy)
- Everett McGill (1945– ), actor
- Marcy McGuire (1926–2021), actress
- Cynthia Kaye McWilliams, actress (Prison Break and Marvel Heroes)
- Brendon Miller (1976– ), pornographic actor
- John Quade (1938–2009), actor
- Shanna Reed (1955– ), actress, dancer
- Angus Scrimm (1926–2016), actor, author
- Columbus Short (1982– ), actor
- Eric Stonestreet (1971– ), actor (Modern Family)
- Jason Sudeikis (1975– ), actor
- Terri Treas (1957– ), actress, screenwriter
- Vicki Trickett (1938–2021), actress
- Matt Vogel (1970– ), puppeteer (The Muppets and Kermit the Frog)
- Lyle Waggoner (1935–2020), actor, sculptor
- Dee Wallace (1948– ), actress
- Tuc Watkins (1966– ), actor (One Life to Live and Desperate Housewives)

=== Journalism ===
- Audrey Cooper (1977– ), journalist
- Bill Downs (1914–1978), broadcast journalist, war correspondent
- Mark Pittman (1957–2009), financial journalist

=== Literature ===
- Jason Aaron (1973– ), Marvel Comics writer (Thor, Ghost Rider, Wolverine, and Punisher Max)
- Julius Lester (1939–2018), writer, professor, photographer

=== Music ===
- William Adam (1917–2013), trumpeter, professor
- James Bracken (1909–1972), songwriter, producer
- Ada Brown (1890–1950), singer
- Eladio Carrión (1994– ), singer, rapper, songwriter
- Earl Carruthers (1910–1971), saxophonist
- Danny Cox (1942– ), singer-songwriter
- Dan Crary (1939– ), flatpick guitarist
- Nathan Davis (1937–2018), saxophonist
- Herschel Evans (1909–1939), saxophonist
- William P. Foster (1919–2010), marching band director
- Piney Gir (1974– ), singer
- Nora Holt (1895–1974), singer, composer, critic
- Charles L. Johnson (1876–1950), ragtime composer
- Carmell Jones (1936–1996), trumpet player
- Ron Jones (1954– ), composer
- Gene McDaniels (1935–2011), singer-songwriter
- Janelle Monáe (1985– ), singer-songwriter, composer, actress ("We Are Young" and Hidden Figures)
- Charlie Parker (1920–1955), jazz saxophonist and composer
- James Scott (1885–1938), ragtime composer
- Vigalantee, rapper and activist
- Jack Washington (1910–1964), saxophonist
- Bobby Watson (1953– ), saxophonist
- J. White Did It (1984– ), record producer
- Marva Whitney (1944–2012), singer

=== Other visual arts ===
- Grant Bond (1974– ), cartoonist, writer
- Ed Dwight (1933– ), sculptor

== Business ==
- Paul Revere Braniff (1897–1954), airline entrepreneur
- Jack Gentry (1923–2006), engineer, manufacturing entrepreneur
- Lewis Hill (1919–1957), public radio entrepreneur
- Eldridge Lovelace (1913–2008), urban planner
- Kevin Warren Sloan (1957– ), landscape architect, urban planner and writer
- Charles E. Spahr (1913–2009), oil company executive
- Cheryl Womack (1950– ), trucking insurance executive

== Crime ==
- Richard Hickock (1931–1965), mass murderer
- James Hogue (1959– ), con artist
- Marc Sappington (1978– ), spree killer

== Medicine ==
- Paul Randall Harrington (1911–1980), orthopedic surgeon, designer of the Harrington Rod

== Military ==
- William N. Alsbrook Sr. (1916–1998), inventor and member of the Tuskegee Airmen
- Roscoe Cartwright, first African-American field artilleryman promoted to brigadier general
- Donald C. Cubbison (1882–1968), US Army major general, raised in Kansas City
- Roy M. Davenport (1909–1987), U.S. Navy rear admiral
- Charles Arthur Tabberer (1915–1942), U.S. Navy lieutenant junior grade, Distinguished Flying Cross recipient

== Politics ==
=== National ===
- Monti Belot (1943– ), U.S. federal judge
- George H. Clay (1911–1995), president of the Federal Reserve Bank of Kansas City
- William Hinson Cole (1837–1886), U.S. representative from Maryland
- Harry Darby (1895–1987), U.S. senator from Kansas
- Ben Fernandez (1925–2000), U.S. ambassador to Paraguay
- Fernando J. Gaitan Jr. (1948– ), U.S. federal judge
- Newell A. George (1904–1992), U.S. representative from Kansas
- John R. Goodin (1836–1885), U.S. representative from Kansas
- Ulysses Samuel Guyer (1868–1943), U.S. representative from Kansas
- Julie Johnson (1966– ), U.S. representative from Texas
- Edward C. Little (1858–1924), U.S. representative from Kansas
- Arthur Johnson Mellott (1888–1957), U.S. federal judge
- Orrin Larrabee Miller (1856–1926), U.S. representative from Kansas
- Carlos Murguia (1957– ), U.S. federal judge
- Mary H. Murguia (1960– ), U.S. federal judge
- Mason S. Peters (1844–1914), U.S. representative from Kansas
- Errett P. Scrivner (1898–1978), U.S. representative from Kansas
- Wint Smith (1892–1976), U.S. representative from Kansas
- Joseph Taggart (1867–1938), U.S. representative from Kansas
- Kathryn Hoefer Vratil (1949– ), U.S. federal judge

=== State ===
- Edward F. Arn (1906–1998), 32nd governor of Kansas
- Carol A. Beier (1958– ), Kansas Supreme Court justice
- Tom Burroughs (1954– ), Kansas state legislator
- James H. DeCoursey, Jr. (1932– ), 36th lieutenant governor of Kansas
- David Haley (1958– ), Kansas state legislator
- Broderick Henderson (1957– ), Kansas state legislator
- Wilkins P. Horton (1889–1950), lieutenant governor of North Carolina
- Phill Kline (1959– ), Kansas state legislator, former attorney general of Kansas
- Mark Martin (1968– ), Arkansas state legislator, Secretary of State of Arkansas
- Joseph Pierron (1947– ), Kansas Court of Appeals judge
- Mary Rogeness (1941– ), Massachusetts state legislator
- Robert Eldridge Seiler (1912–1998), Missouri Supreme Court chief justice
- Chris Steineger (1964– ), Kansas state legislator
- John Strick (1921–2009), Kansas state legislator
- Charles Warren (1927–2019), California state legislator
- Valdenia Winn (1950– ), Kansas state legislator

=== Local ===
- Charles Dail (1909–1968), 27th mayor of San Diego
- Theresa Sparks (1949– ), San Francisco politician

== Religion ==
- James P. deWolfe (1896–1966), fourth bishop of the Episcopal Diocese of Long Island
- Joseph Patrick Dougherty (1905–1970), Roman Catholic clergyman

== Sports ==
=== American football ===
- Jackie Cline (1960– ), defensive lineman
- Lyron Cobbins (1974– ), linebacker
- Maliek Collins (1995– ), defensive tackle
- Harry Colon (1969– ), cornerback, safety
- Ray Evans (1922–1999), halfback
- Eric Guliford (1969– ), wide receiver
- Floyd Harrawood (1929–2003), tackle
- Mark Haynes (1958– ), cornerback
- David Jaynes (1952– ), quarterback
- Reggie Jones (1971– ), wide receiver
- Zvonimir Kvaternik (1918–1994), guard
- Bill Olds (1951– ), running back
- Darrell Stuckey (1987– ), safety
- Justin Swift (1975– ), tight end
- Spencer Thomas (1951– ), safety
- Steve Towle (1953– ), linebacker
- David Verser (1958– ), wide receiver
- Cooper Beebe (2001– ), offensive tackle
- Jaylin Noel (2003- ), wide receiver

=== Baseball ===
- Neil Allen (1958– ), pitcher, pitching coach
- Joe Bowman (1910–1990), pitcher
- Gilly Campbell (1908–1973), catcher
- Jim Clark (1947–2019), outfielder
- David Clyde (1955– ), pitcher
- Alan Cockrell (1962– ), outfielder, hitting coach
- Pat Collins (1896–1960), catcher
- Robert Dodd (1973– ), pitcher
- Mike Dupree (1953– ), pitcher
- Paul Edmondson (1943–1970), pitcher
- Seth Greisinger (1975– ), starting pitcher
- Sherman Jones (1935–2007), pitcher, Kansas state legislator
- Bob Kammeyer (1950–2003), pitcher
- Paul Penson (1931–2006), pitcher
- John Peters (1893–1932), catcher
- Steve Renko (1944– ), pitcher
- Bullet Rogan (1893–1967), outfielder, pitcher
- Ray Sadecki (1940–2014), pitcher
- David Segui (1966– ), 1st baseman
- Kite Thomas (1923–1995), outfielder
- Cotton Tierney (1894–1953), 2nd baseman
- Leo Wells (1917–2006), shortstop, 3rd baseman
- Jimmy Whelan (1890–1929), pinch hitter

=== Basketball ===
- Lucius Allen (1947– ), point guard
- Tamar Bates (2003– ), guard
- Nate Bowie (1986– ), point guard
- Larry Comley (1939–2006), guard
- Larry Drew (1958– ), guard
- Rich Dumas (1945–1991), guard
- Ron Franz (1945–2022), small forward
- Paul Graham (1951– ), coach
- Leonard Gray (1951–2006), power forward
- Harold Hunter (1926–2013), coach
- Warren Jabali (1946–2012), point guard, shooting guard
- Leo Lyons (1987– ), power forward
- John McLendon (1915–1999), coach
- Mark Mitchell (basketball) (2003– ), guard, forward
- Pierre Russell (1949–1995), shooting guard
- Jackie Stiles (1978– ), shooting guard
- Earl Watson (1979– ), point guard and NBA coach
- Bus Whitehead (1928–2010), center, power forward

=== Golf ===
- Bruce Lietzke (1951–2018), golfer
- Jug McSpaden (1908–1996), golfer

=== Pro wrestling ===
- Bob Orton (1929–2006), pro wrestler
- Bob Orton, Jr. (1950– ), pro wrestler
- Baron Corbin (1984- ), pro wrestler

=== Racing ===
- Jennifer Jo Cobb (1973– ), race car driver
- Jeff Emig (1970– ), motocross racer
- Eddie Hearne (1887–1955), race car driver
- Billy Winn (1905–1938), race car driver

=== Track and field ===
- Maurice Greene (1974– ), U.S. Olympic track and field athlete
- Cliff Wiley (1955– ), track and field athlete

=== Other ===
- Bryan Goebel (1961– ), pro bowler
- LeBaron Hollimon (1969– ), soccer forward
- Nick Plott (1983– ), eSports commentator
- Matt Stutzman (1982– ), archer
- Kelvin Tiller (1990– ), mixed martial artist

== See also ==
- Lists of people from Kansas
