= List of people from Kansas City, Missouri =

The list of people from Kansas City, Missouri is for native-born and past residents. Kansas City, Missouri is the central city of the Kansas City metropolitan area.

== A ==
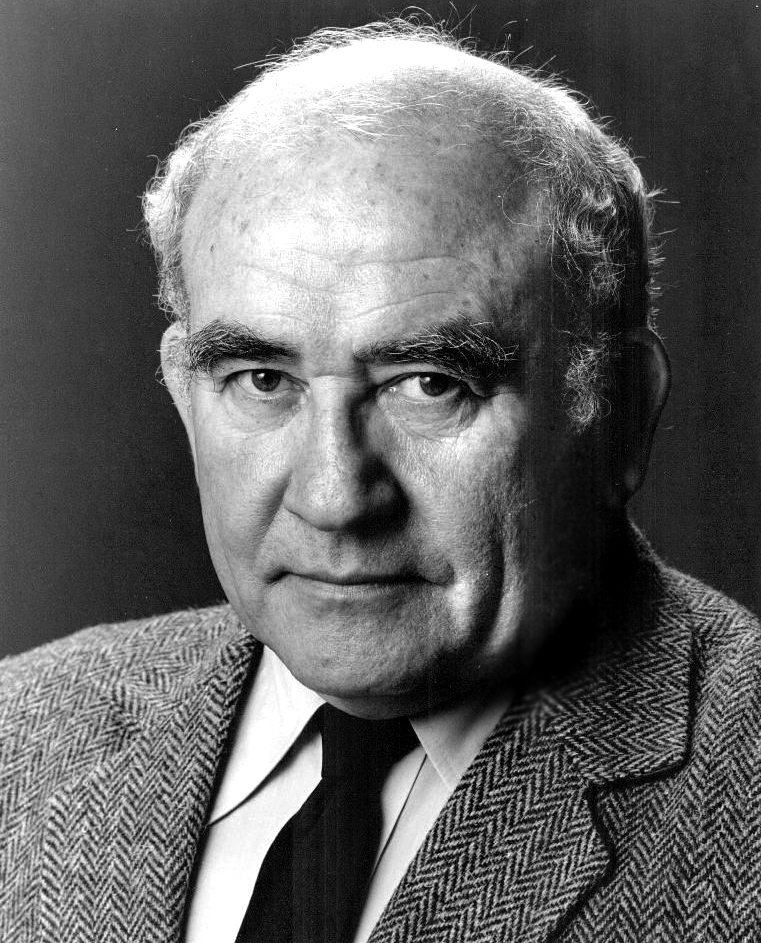
Edward Asner

- Bud Abell – linebacker in the American Football League; born in Kansas City
- Oleta Adams – singer
- Amy Alcott (born 1956) – Hall of Fame professional golfer; born in Kansas City
- M.A. Alford – multimedia artist
- Henry Wilson Allen – Western author and screenwriter
- Kirsten Bloom Allen – ballet dancer and actress; raised in Kansas City
- Robert Altman – film director
- Raleigh DeGeer Amyx – collector of Olympic and presidential memorabilia
- Ernest Appy – composer and cellist
- Sagir Arce – soccer player
- Stewart Ashby Jr. – rapper
- Edward Asner – actor, born in Kansas City
- Ashley Aull – 2006 Miss Kansas USA

== B ==
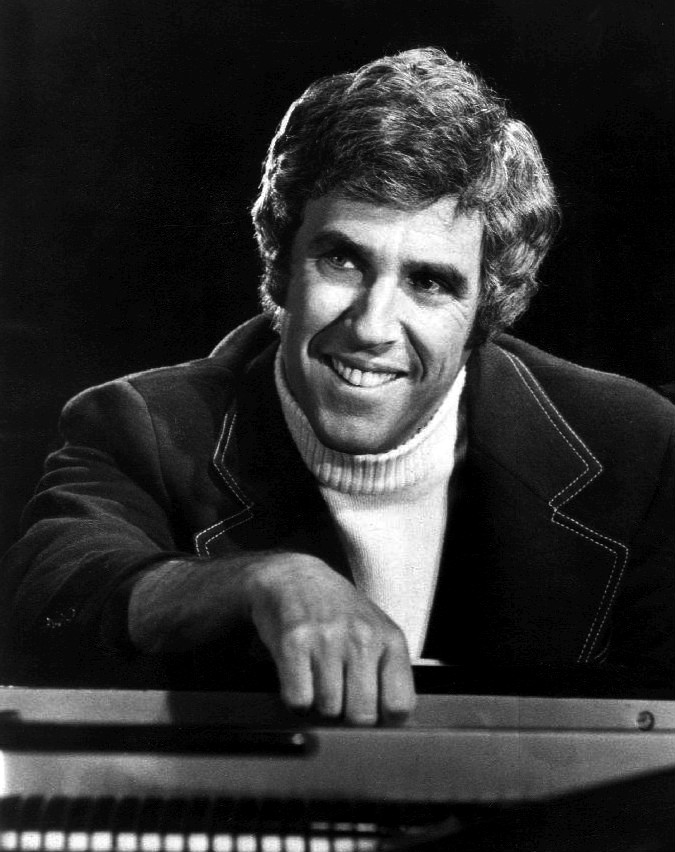
Burt Bacharach

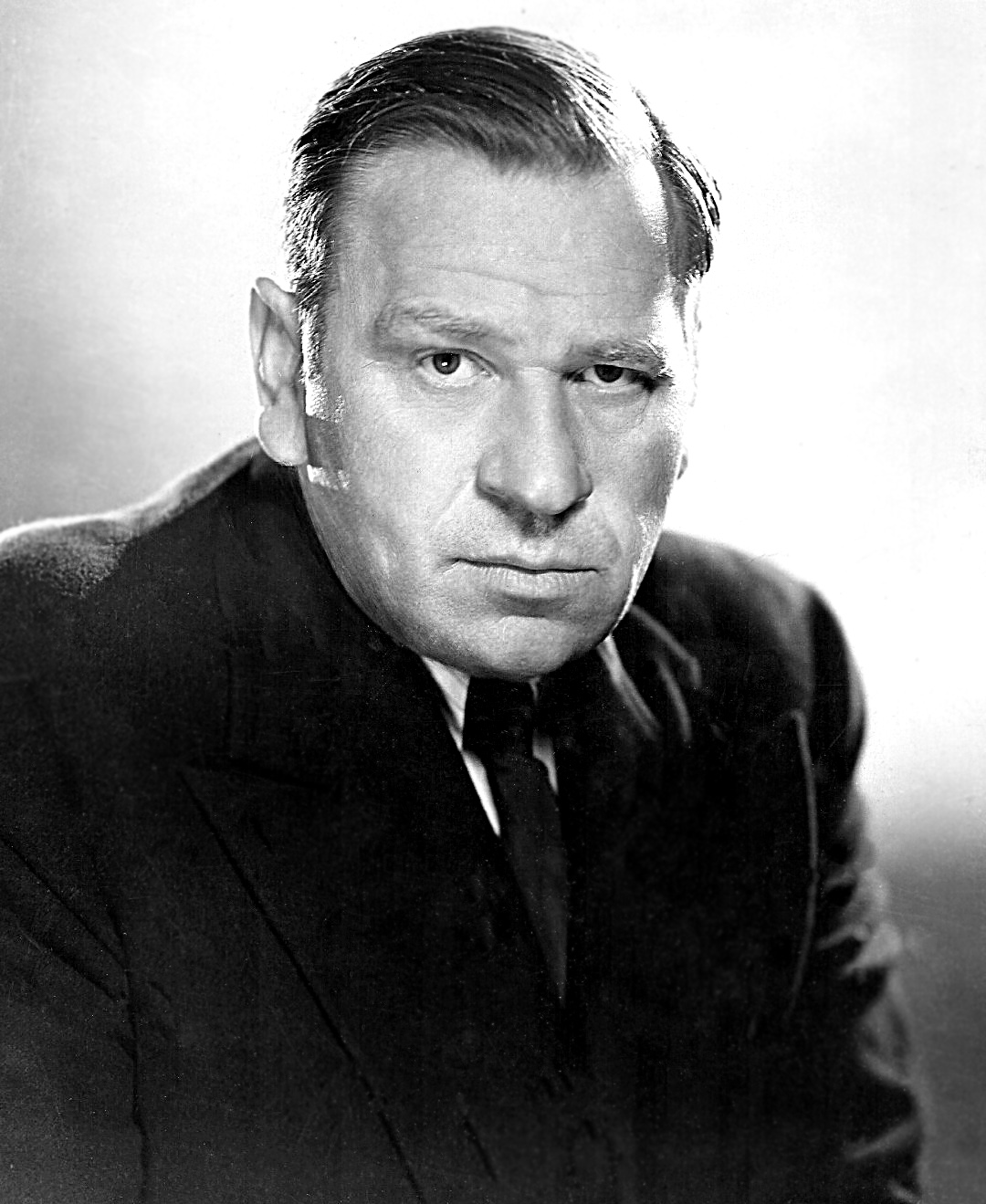
Wallace Beery

- Burt Bacharach – pianist and composer
- Joy Bang – actress, born in Kansas City
- Kay Barnes – mayor of Kansas City 1999–2007
- Hector Barreto Sr. – activist and entrepreneur
- H. Roe Bartle – mayor of Kansas City and namesake of Kansas City Chiefs
- Lucas Bartlett – soccer player
- Count Basie – jazz musician and bandleader
- Noah Beery – actor
- Wallace Beery – Oscar-winning actor
- Thomas Hart Benton – artist
- Richard L. Berkley – politician, former mayor
- Ken Berry – baseball player
- Terry Blair – serial killer
- Danni Boatwright – Survivor: Guatemala winner; Miss Kansas
- Johnny Yong Bosch – actor, martial artist, voice actor, and musician
- Connee Boswell – singer
- George Brett – baseball player, third baseman
- Diane Brewster – actress
- Beau Brinkley – long snapper for the Atlanta Falcons
- Bob Brookmeyer – jazz musician, composer, and bandleader
- Elizabeth Broun – art historian and director of the Smithsonian American Art Museum
- Walter Brown – blues musician
- Sylvia Browne – psychic and medium
- Trevor Burns – soccer player

== C ==
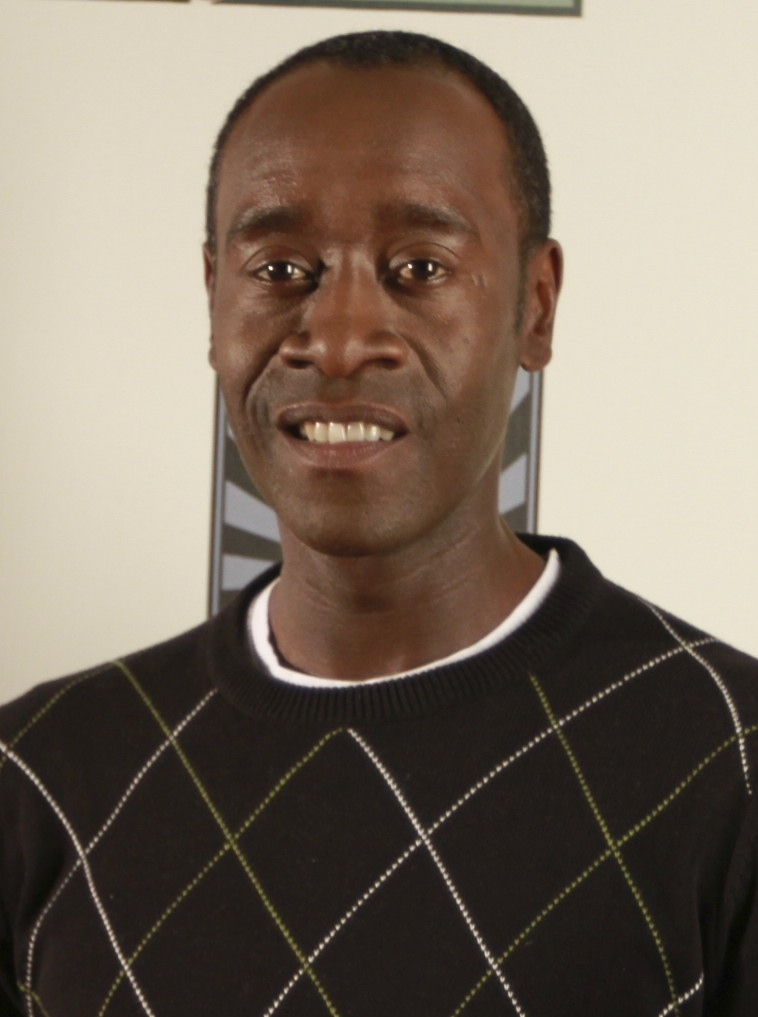
Don Cheadle

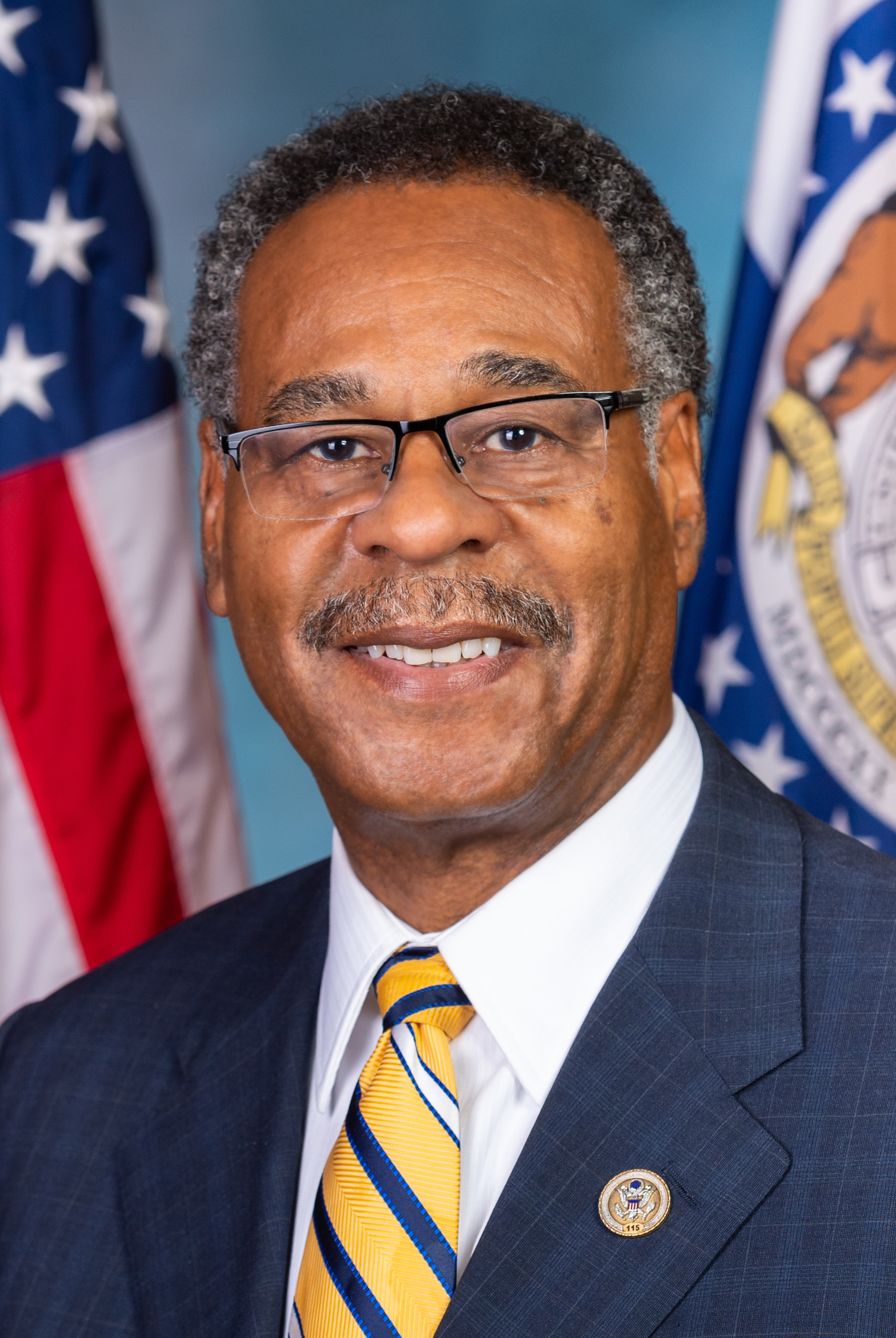
Emanuel Cleaver

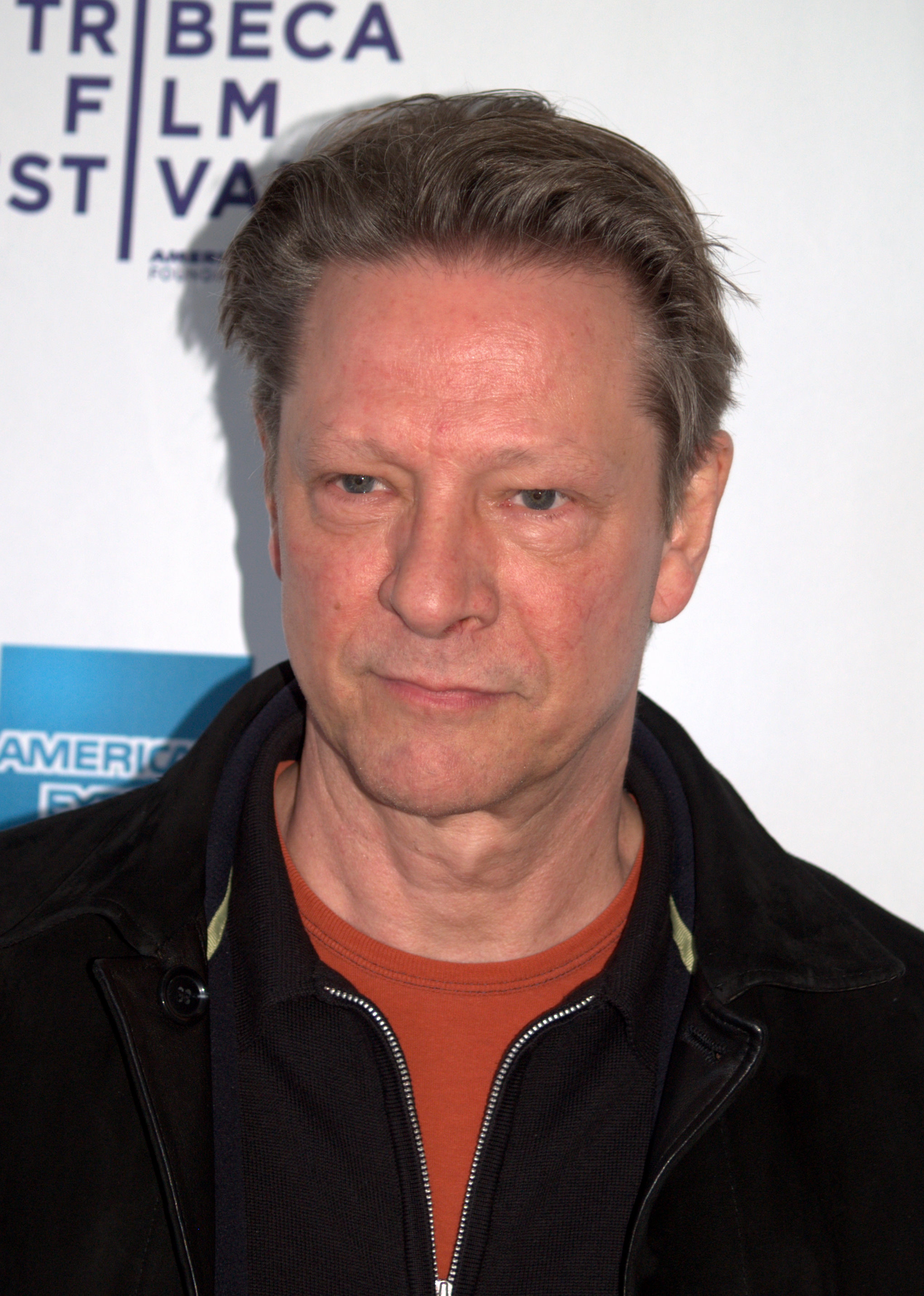
Chris Cooper

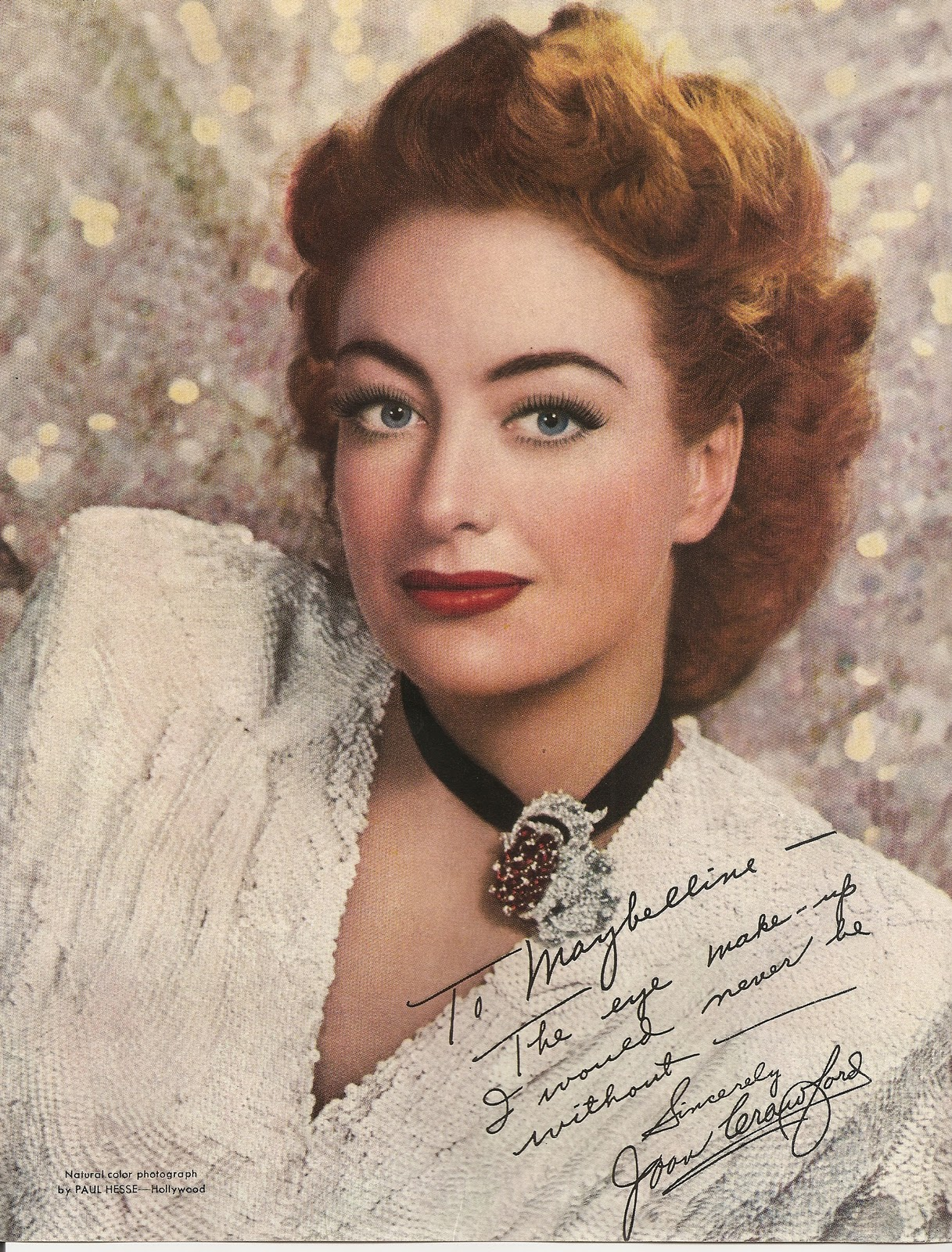
Joan Crawford

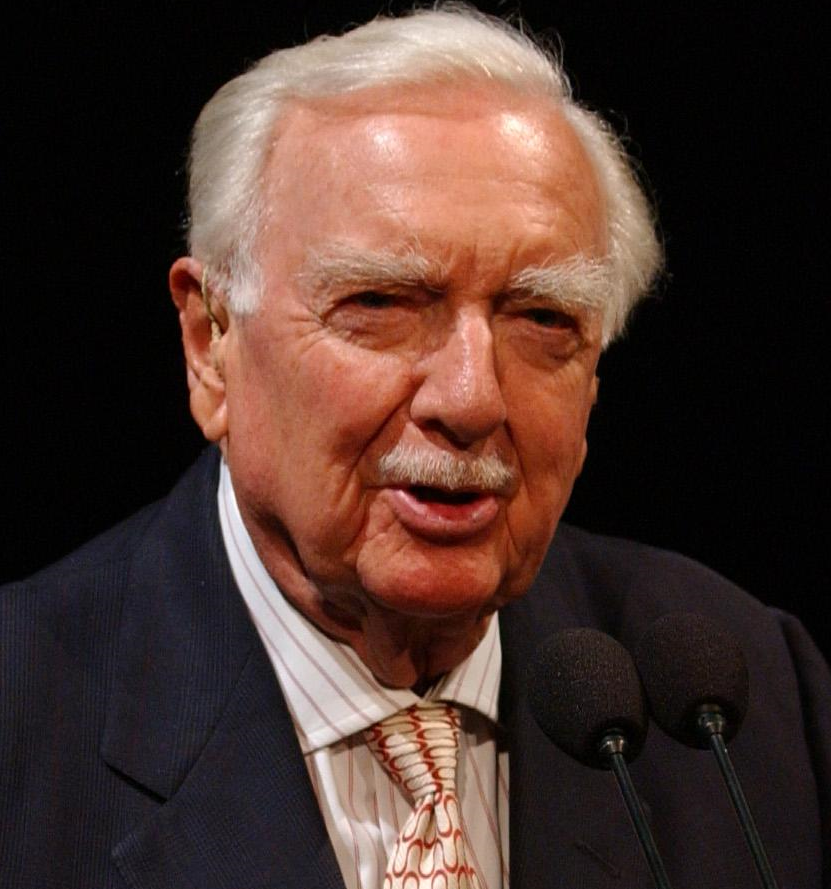
Walter Cronkite

- Melvin Calhoun – rapper
- Danny Carey – drummer for rock band Tool
- John D. Carmack – game programmer
- Joe Carter – baseball player with Cleveland Indians and Toronto Blue Jays; lives in the city
- Vincent O. Carter – writer
- Don Cheadle – actor, Hotel Rwanda, Ocean's Eleven, Crash
- Anthony Civella – mobster
- Emanuel Cleaver – politician, U.S. representative for Fifth District in Missouri
- Gene Clark – singer-songwriter with The Byrds
- Jonathan Coachman – ESPN sportscaster, wrestling commentator, college basketball player
- Jennifer Jo Cobb – NASCAR Camping World Truck Series driver
- Robert Coldsnow – Kansas legislator and lawyer
- Vinson Cole – operatic tenor
- David Cone – Major League Baseball pitcher
- Evan S. Connell – author
- Chris Cooper – Oscar-winning actor
- John Coughlin – figure skater, 2011 U.S. pairs champion
- Joan Crawford – Oscar-winning actor
- Walter Cronkite – CBS television journalist, news anchor

== D ==
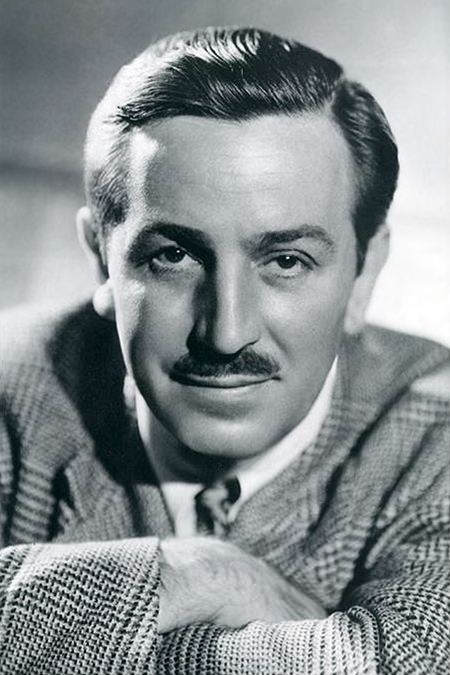
Walt Disney

- Marcus Denmon – NBA player
- Bob Dernier – MLB outfielder
- DeLos F. DeTar – scientist
- Walt Disney – film producer, director, screenwriter, voice actor, and animator
- Sophia Dominguez-Heithoff – model and Miss Teen USA 2017
- James T. Draper Jr. – president of the Southern Baptist Convention 1982–1984; pastor of Red Bridge Baptist Church in Kansas City 1965–1970
- Carol Duboc – singer, composer, arranger, and actress
- Devyn Simone – American television host, matchmaker, and media personality

== E ==
- James E. Edmondson – Oklahoma Supreme Court justice
- Robert Ellis – physicist
- Mireille Enos – actress

== F ==
- Harris Faulkner – newscaster
- Samantha Fish – musician
- Scott Foley – actor
- Lisa Forbes – Miss Kansas and Miss Earth USA 2007
- William P. Foster – band director
- Thomas Frank – writer, editor
- Josh Freeman – NFL quarterback
- Matt Freije – NBA player
- Friz Freleng – film producer, director, animator, and cartoonist

== G ==
- Heidi Gardner – comedian, writer, and actress
- Lorenzo Gilyard – serial killer nicknamed the "Kansas City Strangler"
- Nicholas Gioacchini – soccer player who represented the United States national team
- Caroline Glaser – The Voice contestant
- Renée Good – writer and poet; was infamously shot by a United States Immigration and Customs Enforcement agent in 2026
- Thelma Thurston Gorham – journalist, organization leader, and activist
- Maurice Greene – sprinter, gold-medalist Olympian in track and field
- Masten Gregory – auto racing
- Allen Griffin – California newspaper publisher
- Eddie Griffin – comedian and actor, Deuce Bigalow, Undercover Brother
- Karolyn Grimes – actress, Zu-Zu in the Frank Capra classic It's a Wonderful Life, lived in town for many years

== H ==
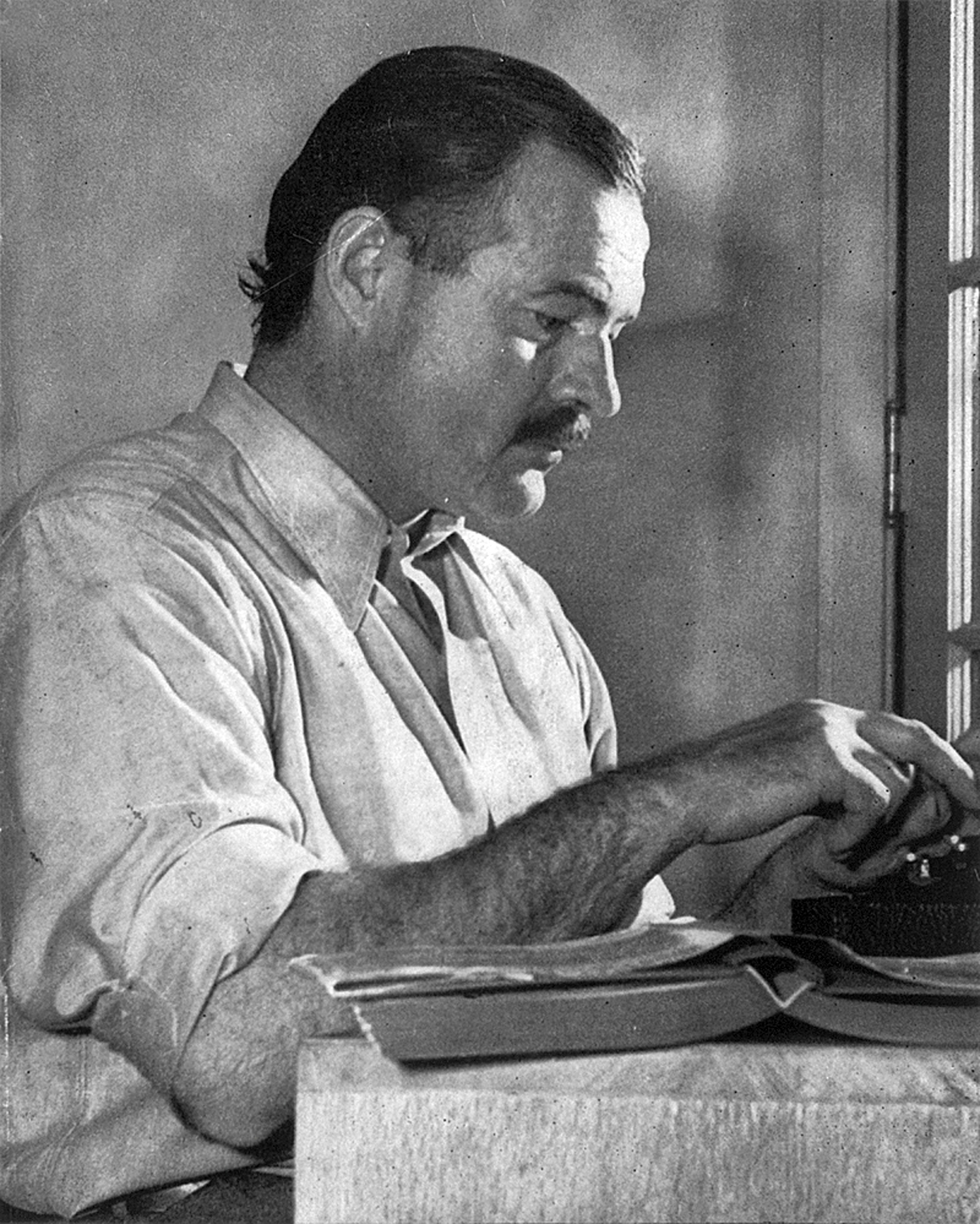
Ernest Hemingway

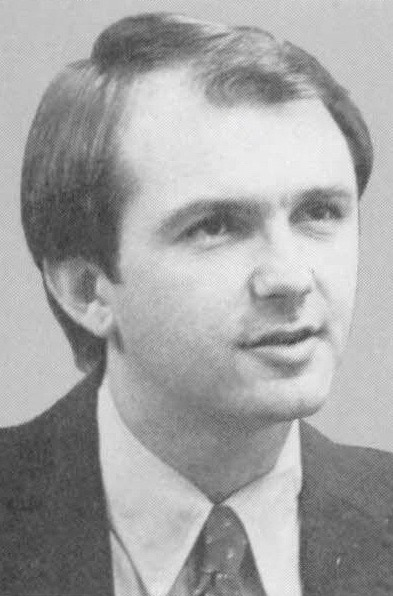
Bob Holden

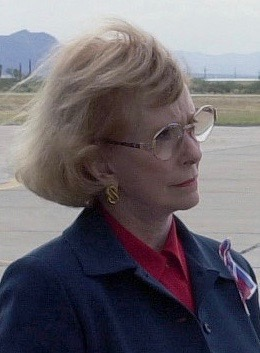
Jane Dee Hull

- Donald J. Hall, Sr. – businessman
- Joyce Hall – businessman, founder of Hallmark Cards
- Jennie Hanna – missionary worker and co-founder of the Woman's Auxiliary of the Presbyterian Church, U.S.
- Leon Harden – football player for Green Bay Packers
- Jean Harlow – actress
- Jessica Harp – country music singer-songwriter, former member of The Wreckers with Michelle Branch
- Rhonda Harper – surfer and surf coach
- Thomas Hayward – leading tenor of Metropolitan Opera
- Caleb Hearon – comedian, writer, actor, and director
- Robert A. Heinlein – science fiction author; his stories are frequently set in or reference Kansas City
- Ernest Hemingway – iconic novelist and short story author
- Shauntay Henderson – FBI Ten Most Wanted fugitive, convicted criminal
- Paul Henning – writer, producer of The Beverly Hillbillies TV series
- Opal Hill – golfer and LPGA co-founder
- Ralph F. Hirschmann (1922–2009) – biochemist who led synthesis of first enzyme
- Mabel Hite – vaudeville and musical comedy performer, father worked at Owl Drug Store
- Clara Cleghorn Hoffman (1831–1908) – temperance activist
- Bob Holden – 53rd governor of Missouri
- Dorothy B. Hughes – novelist
- Jane Dee Hull – 20th governor of Arizona
- Earl Hurd - animated film director, inventor of the animation cel

== I ==
- Rudolf Ising - animator, co-creator of Looney Tunes and Merrie Melodies
- Sean Ingram – musician and entrepreneur
- Ub Iwerks – animator and cartoonist

== J ==
- Bo Jackson – football and baseball player
- Pete Johnson – blues and jazz pianist
- Elaine Joyce – actress

== K ==
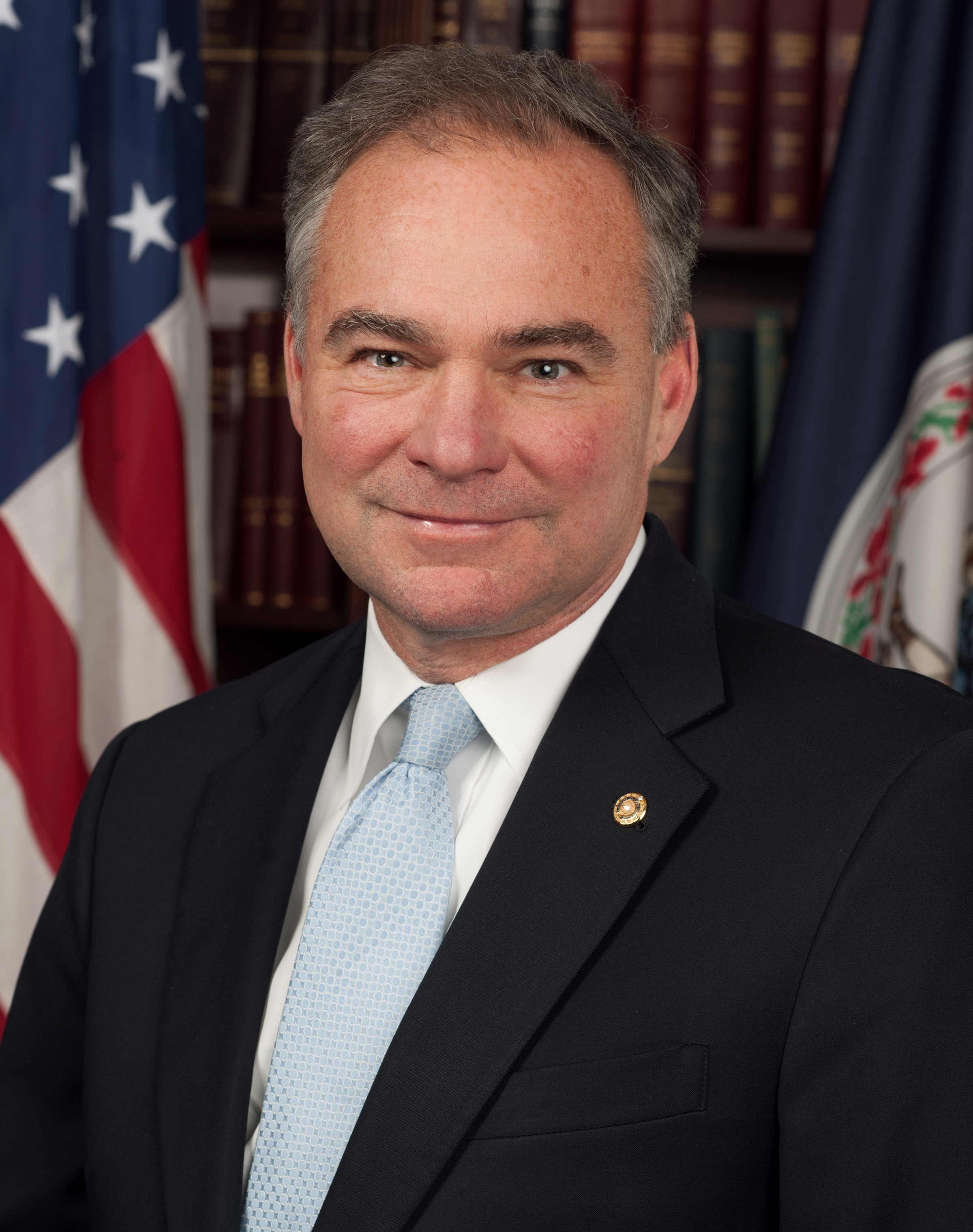
Tim Kaine

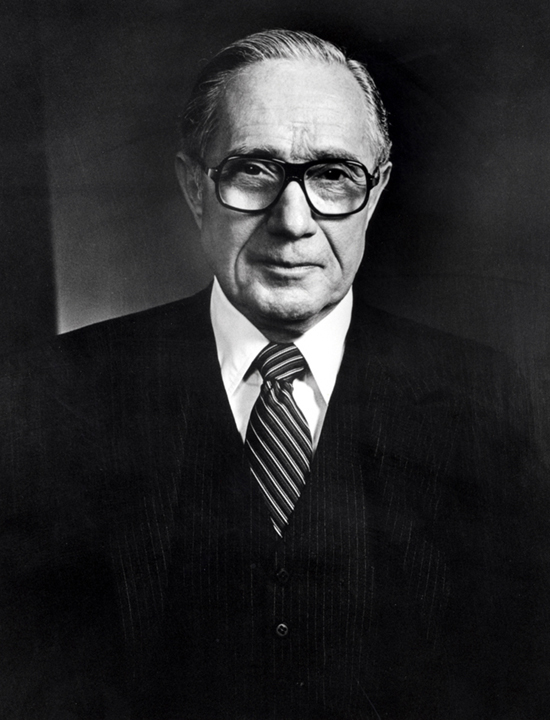
Philip Klutznick

- Tim Kaine – former governor and current U.S. senator from Virginia; 2016 Democratic nominee for vice president under Hillary Clinton
- Krizz Kaliko (born Samuel Watson Jr.) – rapper
- Jason Kander – former Missouri secretary of state
- John Kander – composer
- Sybil Kaplan – journalist and author
- Ewing Kauffman – pharmaceutical magnate, philanthropist, and Major League Baseball owner
- Ellie Kemper – actress, The Office, Unbreakable Kimmy Schmidt
- Vern Kennedy – baseball pitcher
- Bill Kenney – politician, ex-Chiefs player
- Edward Kerr – actor, Above Suspicion, Confessions of a Sexist Pig, The Astronaut's Wife
- Craig Kilborn – actor, sportscaster, talk show host
- John Klein – soccer player for MLS club St. Louis City
- Philip Klutznick – U.S. secretary of commerce to President Jimmy Carter
- Evalyn Knapp – actress

== L ==
- Sarah Lancaster – actress
- Frank Sherman Land – Freemason and founder of Order of DeMolay, international organization for young men
- Barbara Lawrence – actress
- William Least Heat-Moon – author
- Muna Lee – three-time track and field Olympic finalist
- Jeff Leiding – football player
- Lesa Lewis – IFBB professional bodybuilder
- Ryan Lilja – NFL player for Indianapolis Colts and Kansas City Chiefs, Shawnee Mission Northwest High School graduate
- Tyronn Lue – NBA player and current head coach of the Cleveland Cavaliers, Raytown Senior High School
- Betty Lynn – actress best known for playing Thelma Lou on The Andy Griffith Show

== M ==
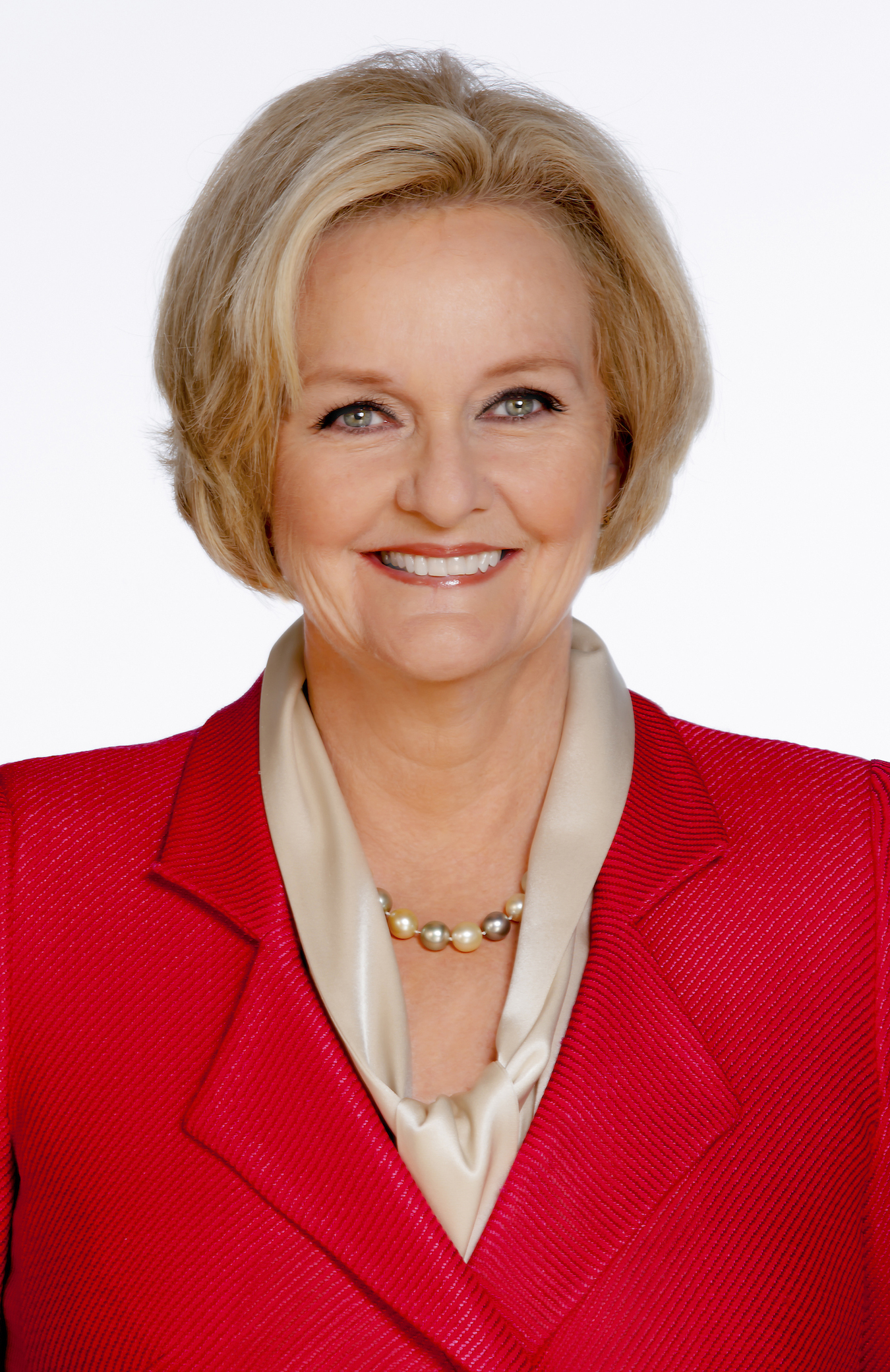
Claire McCaskill

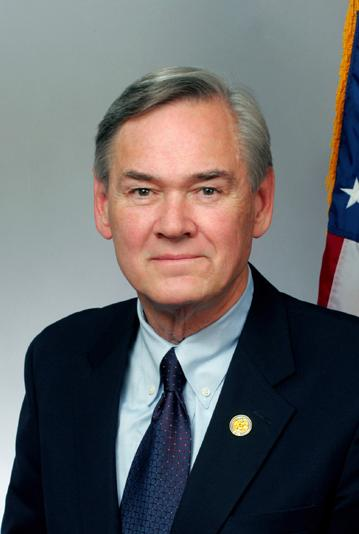
Dennis Moore

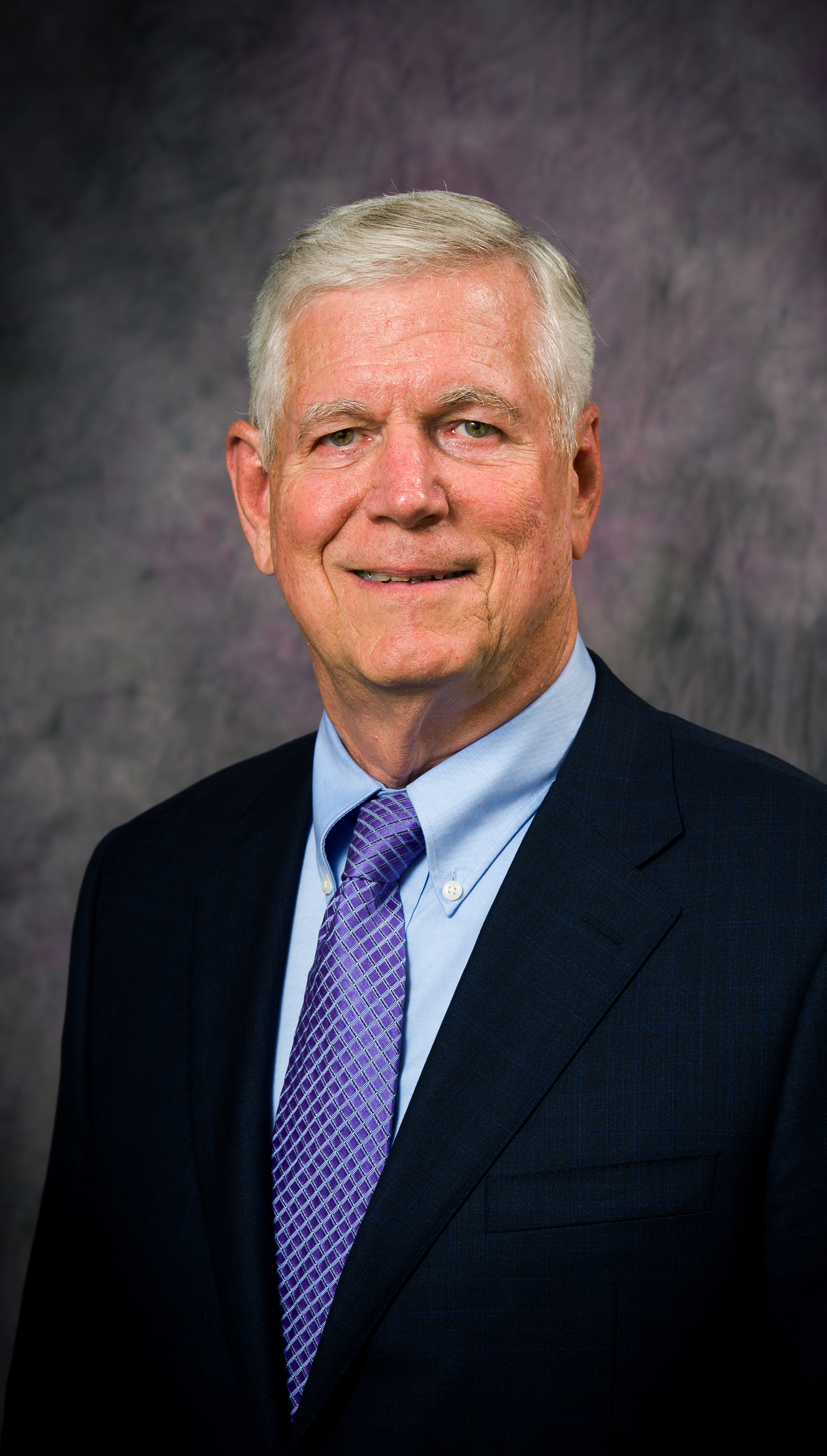
Richard B. Myers

- Bill Maas – NFL player
- Arthur Mag – lawyer, legal counsel to Harry S. Truman
- Sean Malto – professional skateboarder
- Amanda Marsh – first winner of The Bachelor
- Oliver T. Marsh – cinematographer
- Denny Matthews – sportscaster, author
- John Mayberry Jr. – baseball outfielder with Philadelphia Phillies
- Claire McCaskill – politician and senator
- Edie McClurg – actress
- Courtney McCool – athlete and Olympian
- Charles McCormick – singer and bass player, member of the Kansas City R&B band Bloodstone
- Glenn McGee – bioethicist and philosopher
- Katherine McNamara – actress, Shadowhunters
- Jay McShann – blues musician
- Pat Metheny – jazz guitarist
- Frederick H. Michaelis – U.S. Navy admiral
- Sue Miller – breast cancer activist
- Janelle Monáe – singer
- Wendy Moniz – actress
- Julia Montgomery – actress in Revenge of the Nerds and One Life to Live
- Dennis Moore – congressman, politician
- Logan Morrison – baseball player
- Paul Morrison – politician
- Tommy Morrison – heavyweight boxer
- Bennie Moten – pianist, bandleader
- Mancow Muller – radio personality
- Richard B. Myers – U.S. Air Force general and former chairman of the Joint Chiefs of Staff

== N ==
- Rob Neyer – sportswriter
- Danielle Nicole – blues and soul musician
- Jesse Clyde Nichols – developer of commercial and residential real estate
- William F. Nolan – author

== O ==
- Buck O'Neil – baseball player, scout, and coach; first African-American coach in the MLB; helped establish the Negro League Hall of Fame

== P ==
- Satchel Paige – baseball pitcher
- Charlie Parker – jazz saxophonist and composer
- Gordon Parks – screenwriter, director, actor, photographer
- Mark Patton – actor
- Jamie Paulin-Ramirez – American Muslim convert arrested in Jihad Jane plot to kill a Danish artist
- Rodney Peete – NFL quarterback, Fox Sports TV host
- Tom Pendergast – political boss
- Tom Pernice Jr. – professional golfer
- Suzan Pitt - animated film director, painter
- Darrell Porter – professional baseball player, author
- Joe Posnanski – sports writer, author
- William Powell – actor
- The Pruitt Twins – identical twin brothers, Millus David Pruett [sic] and Myles Pennington Pruett, blues musicians
- Matthew Pryor – lead singer of The Get Up Kids

== R ==
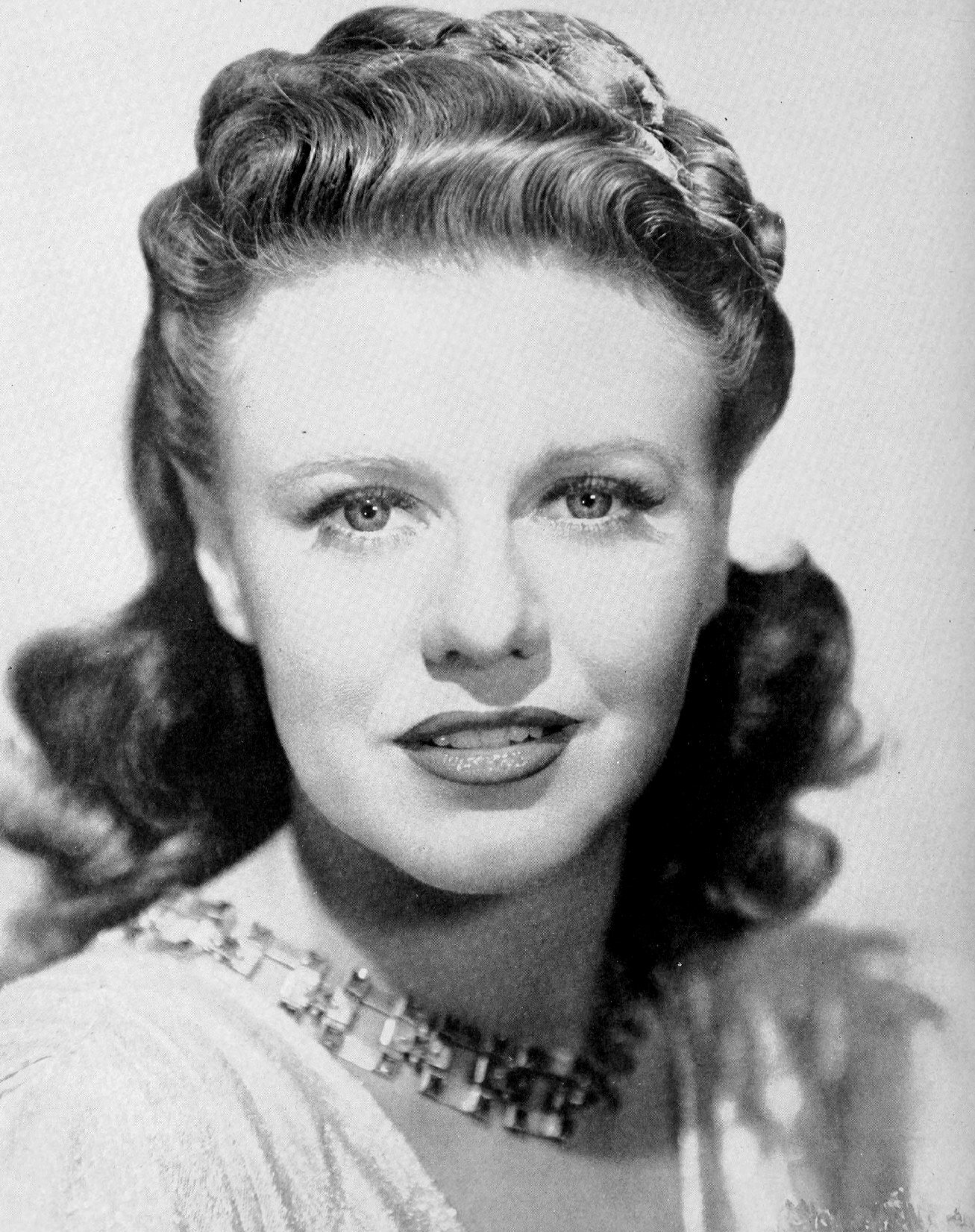
Ginger Rogers

- Joe Randa – baseball player
- Rudy Reyes – actor and former U.S. Marine sergeant
- Bullet Rogan – baseball player
- Ginger Rogers – dancer, Academy Award-winning actress, Broadway performer
- Michael Rosbash – geneticist at Brandeis University, Nobel laureate
- Karl L. Rundberg (1899–1969) – Los Angeles City Council member
- Brandon Rush – NBA player
- Kareem Rush – NBA player
- Pierre Russell – basketball player

== S ==
- Ray Sadecki – Major League Baseball pitcher
- Lori Saunders – actress, Petticoat Junction
- Rachel Saunders – 2005 Miss Kansas USA
- Melana Scantlin – Miss Missouri USA and Average Joe star, co-host of World Series of Blackjack
- Wes Scantlin – lead singer and rhythm guitarist of rock band Puddle of Mudd, cousin of Melana Scantlin
- Nick Schnebelen – blues rock musician
- Josh Shapiro – former attorney general and current governor of Pennsylvania
- Ted Shawn – modern dance pioneer
- Columbus Short – choreographer, actor, singer
- Sam Simmons – former NFL and Arena Football League player
- Crystal Smith – model
- Jack Sock – professional tennis player
- Alberto Sordi – Italian actor (honorary citizen)
- Kate Spade – fashion designer
- Nancy Speir – children's book illustrator
- Alexis Spight – gospel musician
- Casey Stengel – baseball player and Hall of Fame manager
- Michael Stevens – YouTuber, educator, public speaker, creator and host of Mind Field
- Eric Stonestreet – actor
- George Strohmeyer – football player
- Justin Swift – football player with NFL's Detroit Lions

== T ==
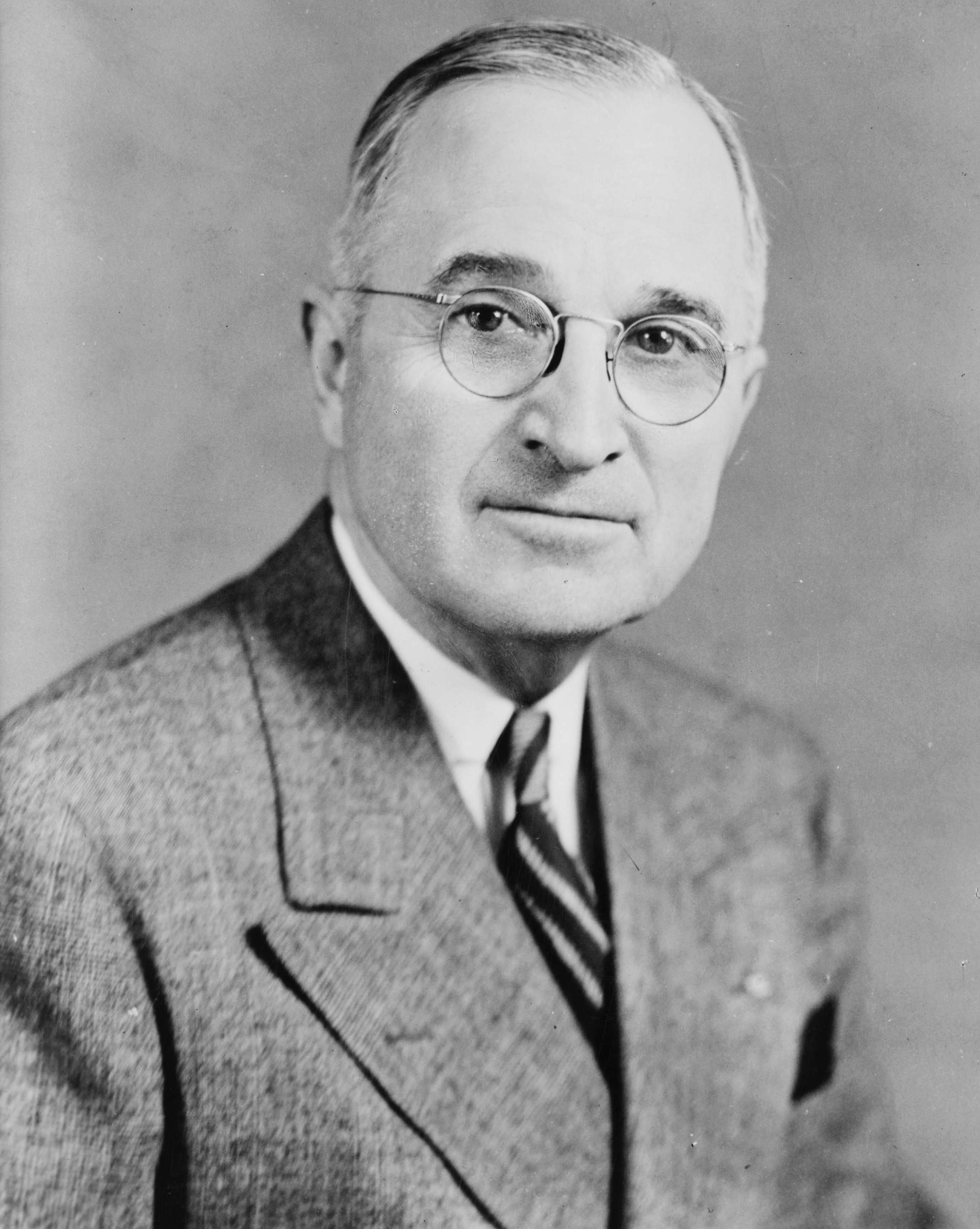
Harry S. Truman

- DePrice Taylor – executive director of community relations for the Kansas City Current and member of the Kansas City Parks Board
- Myra Taylor – blues singer, solo career and member of the Wild Women of Kansas
- Tech N9ne – rapper
- Bobb'e J. Thompson – child actor
- Virgil Thomson – Pulitzer Prize-winning composer
- Calvin Trillin – food writer, journalist, humorist
- Marion A. Trozzolo – businessman, River Quay
- Harry S. Truman – 33rd president of the United States (from Independence, Missouri)
- Lisa Tucker – writer
- Big Joe Turner – blues singer

== V ==
- Henry Clay Van Noy – owner of Van Noy Railway News and Hotel Company (today known as HMSHost)
- Grace VanderWaal – singer-songwriter, ukuleleist, and season 11 winner of NBC's America's Got Talent
- Dorothy Vaughan – mathematician and human computer at NASA

== W ==
- Mabel Wagnalls – pianist, writer, philanthropist
- Janie Wagstaff – 1992 Olympic swimmer
- Dee Wallace – actress, E.T. the Extra-Terrestrial
- Ish Wainright (born 1994) – American-Ugandan basketball player for Hapoel Tel Aviv of the Israeli Basketball Premier League, formerly in the NBA
- Earl Watson – basketball player
- Orla Watson – inventor
- Tom Watson – professional golfer, twice Masters champion, five-time British Open winner, World Golf Hall of Fame
- Ben Webster – jazz saxophonist
- Charles Wheeler – Kansas City Mayor
- Frank White – professional baseball player
- Jason Whitlock – sports journalist
- Dianne Wiest – two-time Oscar-winning actress
- Suzanne Wikle – politician
- Chuck Wild – recording artist, songwriter and composer
- Jason Wiles – actor, played Maurice 'Bosco' Boscorelli in TV series Third Watch
- Barry Winchell – private first class, murdered by a fellow soldier for his sexual orientation
- Smoky Joe Wood – a.k.a. the Kansas Cyclone; professional baseball player for Boston Red Sox and Cleveland Indians
- Doug Worgul – journalist and author of the novel Thin Blue Smoke
- Chely Wright – country music singer
- Katie Wright – actress; married to Hank Azaria

== Y ==
- Josephine Silone Yates – professor and writer, first Black woman to hold a full professorship or head a science department in the U.S.

== See also ==
- List of people from Missouri
- List of people from Kansas City, Kansas
