= Walter Shublom =

Basketball coach

Walt Shublom
Personal information
- Born: February 5, 1923; Salina, Kansas
- Died: February 14, 2009 (aged 86); Overland Park, Kansas

Career information
- High school: Salina Central (Kansas)
- College: Southeast Missouri Teachers College

Career history

Coaching
- Wyandotte High School (1952-1955) Assistant coach; Wyandotte High School (1955-1969) Head coach; University of Missouri (1969-1971) Assistant coach – freshmen; Kansas City Kansas Community College (1971-1982) Head coach

Operations
- Kansas City Kansas Community College (1971-1985) Athletic director

Awards and highlights
- 10 Kansas High School large class basketball state championships; 3 Kansas High School large class basketball state runner-ups; 296-26 career record at Wyandotte High School; Inducted into 8 Halls of Fame

Walter R. Shublom was a high school, junior college and college basketball coach, and minor league baseball player. He was inducted into the National High School Hall of Fame in 1982.

== Early life and playing career ==
After graduating from Salina High School in 1941, Shublom played one season of minor league baseball in the Pittsburgh Pirates organization.

== Coaching career ==
After obtaining his undergraduate degree at Southeast Missouri State Teachers College (now Southeast Missouri State University) and graduate degree at the University of Kansas, Shublom was hired in 1952 to join the faculty of Wyandotte High School in Kansas City, Kansas as a history teacher and assistant baseball and basketball coach.

In 1955, he was hired as varsity basketball coach at Wyandotte High School. In his 14-year tenure at Wyandotte, Shublom led the Bulldogs to 10 large class Kansas high school state championships and 3 second place finishes and a career record of 296-26.

Among the notable players Shublom coached at Wyandotte were NBA players Lucius Allen and Larry Comley, MLB player Steve Renko, ABA player Pierre Russell, All-Big 8 Kansas Jayhawk Nolen Ellison, and NFL player Alonzo (Skip) Thomas.

Shublom was among several outstanding Kansas City-area high school coaches in the 1960’s and early 1970’s that included Jim Wilkinson and Charlie Lee (Kansas City Central), Bud Lathrop (Raytown South), Homer Drew (Lee’s Summit), C. W. Stessman (Paseo), Bill Myles, Walt Thompson (Kansas City Southeast), and Al Davis (Rockhurst).

In 1969, Shublom joined the University of Missouri basketball staff as freshman coach under legendary coach Norm Stewart. Shublom coached the freshmen at Missouri for two seasons finishing with an overall record of 21-2. In January 1972, the NCAA passed a rule that allowed freshmen to be eligible for varsity competition. This new rule eliminated NCAA freshman basketball programs that had previously been “feeder programs” for the varsity teams.

In 1971, Shublom was hired as Athletic Director and Basketball coach at Kansas City Kansas Community College where he coached 10 seasons. After retiring from coaching in 1982, Shublom continued at KCKCC as Athletic Director and added the role of Assistant to the President before retiring in 1985.

== Hall of Fame Inductions ==
- National High School Federation Hall of Fame (inducted in 1982),
- Kansas Sports Hall of Fame (inducted in 1990),
- Missouri Sports Hall of Fame (inducted in 1991)
- Kansas State High School Activities Association Hall of Fame (inducted in 1983)
- Kansas Basketball Coaches Association Hall of Fame (inducted in 1984),
- Missouri Basketball Coaches Association Hall of Fame (inducted in 1991).
- Greater Kansas City Sports Hall of Champions (inducted in 1983)
- National Association of Basketball Coaches Hall of Fame (inducted in 1984)

== Author ==
Shublom wrote three books on basketball coaching. “Tips to Titles”, “The Ways of a Champion”, and “Championships Come Easy If...”. Shublom was also a noted public speaker and clinician operating the “Clinic of Champions” for many years.

== Other Honors ==
In 2003 the Wyandotte High School gymnasium was named “Walter R. Shublom Gymnasium”. Shublom and Wyandotte High School appear in the “High School Dynasty” section of the Naismith Memorial Basketball Hall of Fame.
