= Thomas Rehorn =

American politician (1937–1989)

Member of the Kansas Senate from the 4th district
- In office 1977–1984
- Succeeded by: John Strick

Personal details
- Born: November 19, 1937
- Died: December 14, 1989 Mission, Kansas
- Party: Democratic
- Spouse: Kay Rehorn

Thomas Richard Rehorn Jr. (November 19, 1937 – December 14, 1989) was a Democratic member of the Kansas State Senate from 1977 to 1984.
