= Reggie Jones (wide receiver) =

American football player and triple jumper (born 1971)

No. 81, 83, 87
- Position: Wide receiver

Personal information
- Born: May 8, 1971 (age 55); Kansas City, Kansas, U.S.
- Listed height: 6 ft 0 in (1.83 m)
- Listed weight: 175 lb (79 kg)

Career information
- High school: Wyandotte (Kansas City)
- College: LSU
- NFL draft: 1995: undrafted

Career history
- Washington Redskins (1995)*; Carolina Panthers (1995); Kansas City Chiefs (1997); London Monarchs (1998); Saskatchewan Roughriders (1999); San Diego Chargers (2000–2001); Kansas City Chiefs (2001); Ottawa Renegades (2002–2003); Winnipeg Blue Bombers (2003-2004)
- * Offseason or practice squad member only

Career NFL statistics
- Receptions: 27
- Receiving yards: 282
- Return yards: 195
- Stats at Pro Football Reference

Reginald Lee Jones (born May 8, 1971) is an American former professional football player who was a wide receiver in the National Football League (NFL). He played college football for the LSU Tigers. He played in the NFL for the Carolina Panthers (1995–1996), the Kansas City Chiefs (1997–1998, 2001), and the San Diego Chargers (2000–2001). He finished his career with the Ottawa Renegades of the Canadian Football League (CFL), where he caught 28 passes in 2002.

Jones was also a member of the Tigers track and field team.

In track and field, he competed internationally for the United States, performing in the triple jump qualifiers at the 1993 World Championships in Athletics, and placing sixth at both the 1994 IAAF World Cup and 1993 Summer Universiade. At national level, he placed third at the USA Outdoor Track and Field Championships in 1993 and 1994. He failed to make the 1992 Summer Olympics team after placing fifth at the 1992 United States Olympic Trials. At the age of eighteen he won the American Junior College triple jump title in 1991. In his collegiate career with the LSU Tigers, he placed second in the triple jump at the 1993 NCAA Division I Outdoor Track and Field Championships as well as coming seventh in the long jump and leading off the winning 4 × 100 meters relay team alongside Glenroy Gilbert, Chris King and Fabian Muyaba. The latter marked Louisiana's defence of that title, as Jones, King, Bryant Williams and Jason Sanders also won the NCAA 4 × 100 m relay in 1992.

== International competitions ==
Year	Competition	Venue	Position	Event	Notes
1993	Universiade	Buffalo, United States	6th	Triple jump	16.64 m
1993	World Championships	Stuttgart, Germany	9th (q)	Triple jump	16.83 m
1994	World Cup	London, United Kingdom	6th	Triple jump	16.41 m w

== Personal records ==
- 100 metres – 10.25 (1993)
- Long jump – 8.24 m (1994)
- Triple jump – 17.12 m (1992)

== National titles ==
- NCAA Outdoor Championships
  - 4 × 100 m relay: 1992, 1993

== See also ==
- List of people from Kansas City, Kansas
