= Kansas Sports Hall of Fame =

Sports museum in Wichita, Kansas

- The Kansas Sports Hall of Fame in 2026

- Location within Kansas
- Location: Wichita Boat House, 515 South Wichita Street, Wichita, Kansas 67202
- Coordinates: 37°40′51″N 97°20′29″W
- Website: kshof.org

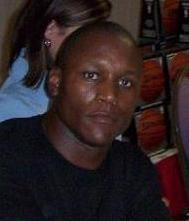
Barry Sanders, one of Kansas' most famous athletes

The Kansas Sports Hall of Fame is a museum located in Wichita, dedicated to preserving the history of sports in the state of Kansas. The museum provides exhibits, archives, facilities, services, and activities to honor those individuals and teams whose achievements in sports brought distinction to themselves, to their communities and to the entire state of Kansas.

== History ==
The Hall of Fame was founded in 1961 as part of the Kansas Centennial Celebration. The museum has had a number of homes over the years, and is now located in Wichita, at 238 N. Mead. Funding for operating expenses is provided in part by donations, admissions, gift shop sales, and special events. The 27,000-square-foot (2,500 m^{2}) museum is not only a family attraction, it is also a facility for entertaining. The Hall can be used for special events, receptions, and conferences in a variety of settings.

In June 2009 the museum announced the creation of the Kansas Sports Museum, located at The Chisholm Trail Center in Newton, Kansas. The Hall of Fame also announced that it would be moving from its current location at 238 N. Mead to the Wichita Boathouse as part of a cost-saving measure through an agreement with Bill Koch, whose 1992 America's Cup winning yacht America³ is on display there. The new museum in Newton will occupy 21,000 square feet (2,000 m^{2}) in the Chisholm Trail Center, 601 SE 36th St. (I-135 Exit 28). It will house exhibits and memorabilia the hall of fame won't have room for after it moves to its new location at the Wichita Boathouse.

The Museum in Old Town Wichita is currently closed while the moving and renovation processes are taking place.

== What to see ==
=== Basketball ===
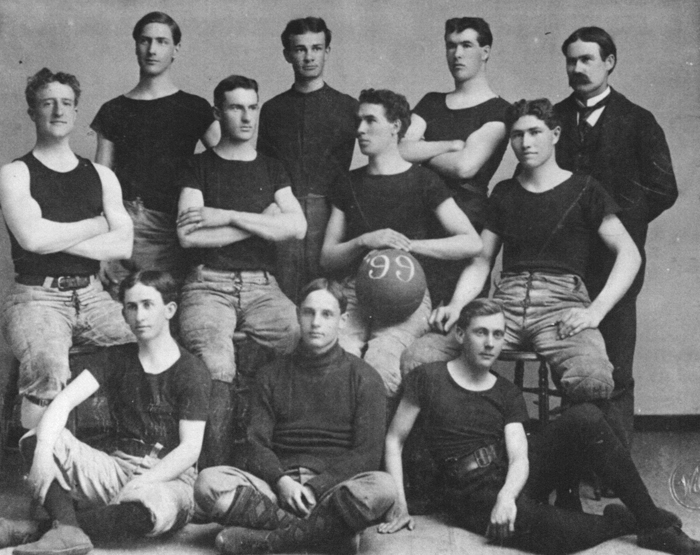
First basketball team at the University of Kansas, 1899. Coach James Naismith is on the far right.

Kansas is called the "Cradle of Basketball." Basketball's inventor, James Naismith, the namesake of the Basketball Hall of Fame is featured prominently in this area of the museum. Legendary coaches such as Phog Allen, Adolph Rupp, Dean Smith, Ralph Miller, Ted Owens, Eddie Sutton, Jack Hartman, Tex Winter, Gene Keady, Jack Gardner, Dutch Lonborg, John McLendon, Ralph Nolan, Bill Morse, Ron Slaymaker, Bob Chipman, and Walt Shublom are also showcased.

On display NBA and NCAA Basketball jerseys, balls, trophies, plaques and highlights of Kansas high school basketball. It also features displays of the prep dynasties of Dwight, McPherson, Newton, Wichita South, and Wyandotte are prominent as well as recognition of Bishop Miege and Little River Girls basketball dominance.

The museum also has photos and memorabilia from women basketball stars like Lynette Woodard, Jackie Stiles, Kendra Wecker, Nicole Ohlde, Laurie Koehn, Billie Moore, and Marian Washington.

=== Football ===
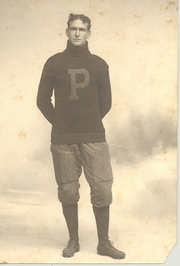
An early 20th century photograph of Garfield Weede, a charter member admitted to the Hall of Fame in 1961

Jerseys, helmets, balls, All-American awards and certificates won by Kansans John Hadl, Lynn Dickey, Nolan Cromwell also by Pro Football Hall of Famers Gale Sayers, John Riggins, Barry Sanders, and Mike McCormack are located in this gallery.

The Governor's Cup, given annually to the winner of the Kansas State University vs. University of Kansas game is on display. A tribute to K-State's national prominence under Coach Bill Snyder features a photo collection and memorabilia of the Wildcats dynasty.

There is a memorial to honor the lives of Wichita State University football players killed in the tragic WSU plane crash of October 1970.

Kansas' small college football history includes Pittsburg State's national dominance under coaches Carnie Smith, Dennis Franchione, and Chuck Broyles, Bethany College Coach Ted Kessinger, Coffeyville Community College Coach Dick Foster.

Kansas' high school football exhibits include items from perennial state powers such as Kapaun Mt. Carmel, Lawrence, Midway-Denton, Pittsburg-Colgan, Smith Center, Conway Springs and feature Kansas prep stars like DeAngelo Evans of Wichita Collegiate, Shannon Kruger of Silver Lake, John Riggins of Centralia and Hall of Fame coaches Eddie Kriwiel and Al Woolard.

=== Baseball ===
Some famous baseball professionals from Kansas such as Baseball Hall of Famers Walter Johnson, Joe Tinker and Fred Clarke are presented in the baseball gallery. Photos and memorabilia from the Wichita State Shocker program under Coach Gene Stephenson with stars like Joe Carter, Darren Dreifort, and Mike Pelfrey are surrounded by vintage photos and memorabilia including autographed pieces by Johnson, Babe Ruth, Mickey Mantle, Mel Ott and countless others.

Kansas City Royals longtime standout player George Brett was inducted in 2017.

The Coleman Company/Johnny Bench Award, given annually to the Collegiate Catcher of the Year by the Wichita Sports Commission is also on display here at the Kansas Sports Hall of Fame as are items from numerous Kansas baseball icons including: Hap Dumont, Elden Auker, Bill Russell, Ralph Houk, Gene Mauch, Daryl Spencer, and Murry Dickson.

=== Track and field ===
The track and field gallery shows off Kansas's reputation as one of the nation's leading producers of track and Olympic stars. Two Olympic gold medals are on display as well as shoes worn by world record holders Jim Ryun, Wes Santee, Al Oerter, Glenn Cunningham, and Thane Baker.

Olympic champions Billy Mills, Bill Nieder, Maurice Greene, John Kuck, Catherine Fox, Peter Mehringer and Kenny Harrison – and others, are prominently presented. There is also a high jump bar set at 7' 4 ½", the Kansas high school record set by Brad Speer of Wichita East in 1984 on display, and hundreds of photos of Kansas high school and college standouts.

== Inductees ==
As of 2017 there are 273 individuals who have been named to the hall of fame, and the class of 2018 added 11 more for a total of 286. New members are inducted each fall. A partial list of Hall-of-Famers includes:

- Johnny Adams
- Mike Ahearn
- Lucius Allen
- Phog Allen
- Elden Auker
- Thane Baker
- Ernie Barrett
- Bill Bates
- Jim Bausch
- Mike Bell
- Rolando Blackman
- Michael Bishop
- Bob Boozer
- Bob Brannum
- George Brett
- Chuck Broyles
- Kurt Budke
- Antoine Carr
- Joe Carter
- Wilt Chamberlain
- Jim Colbert
- Nolan Cromwell
- Glenn Cunningham
- Darren Daulton
- Lynn Dickey
- Bobby Douglass
- Fred Etchen
- Mike Evans
- Jack Gardner
- Martin Gramatica
- Steve Grogan
- Bill Guthridge
- John Hadl
- Bill Hargiss
- Jack Hartman
- Jim Helmer
- Ralph Houk
- David Jaynes
- Walter Johnson
- Ewing Kauffman
- Al Kelley
- Bob Kenney
- John Kuck
- Lon Kruger
- Bill Lienhard
- Emil Liston
- Cleo Littleton
- Clyde Lovellette
- Danny Manning
- Harold Manning
- Xavier McDaniel
- Ralph Miller
- Billy Mills
- Brian Moorman
- Margaret Murdock
- Willie Murrell
- James Naismith
- Bill Nieder
- Al Oerter
- Nicole Ohlde
- John Outland
- Ted Owens
- Paul Pierce
- John Riggins
- Adolph Rupp
- Jim Ryun
- Ernie Quigley
- Barry Sanders
- Archie San Romani
- Gale Sayers
- Walter Shublom
- Wayne Simien
- Bill Snyder
- David Snyder
- Gary Spani
- Bud Stallworth
- Dave Stallworth
- Eddie Sutton
- Bill Tidwell
- Tom Watson
- Garfield Weede
- Fran Welch
- Jess Willard
- Tex Winter
- Lynette Woodard
