= Wyandotte High School =

Public school in Kansas City, Kansas, United States

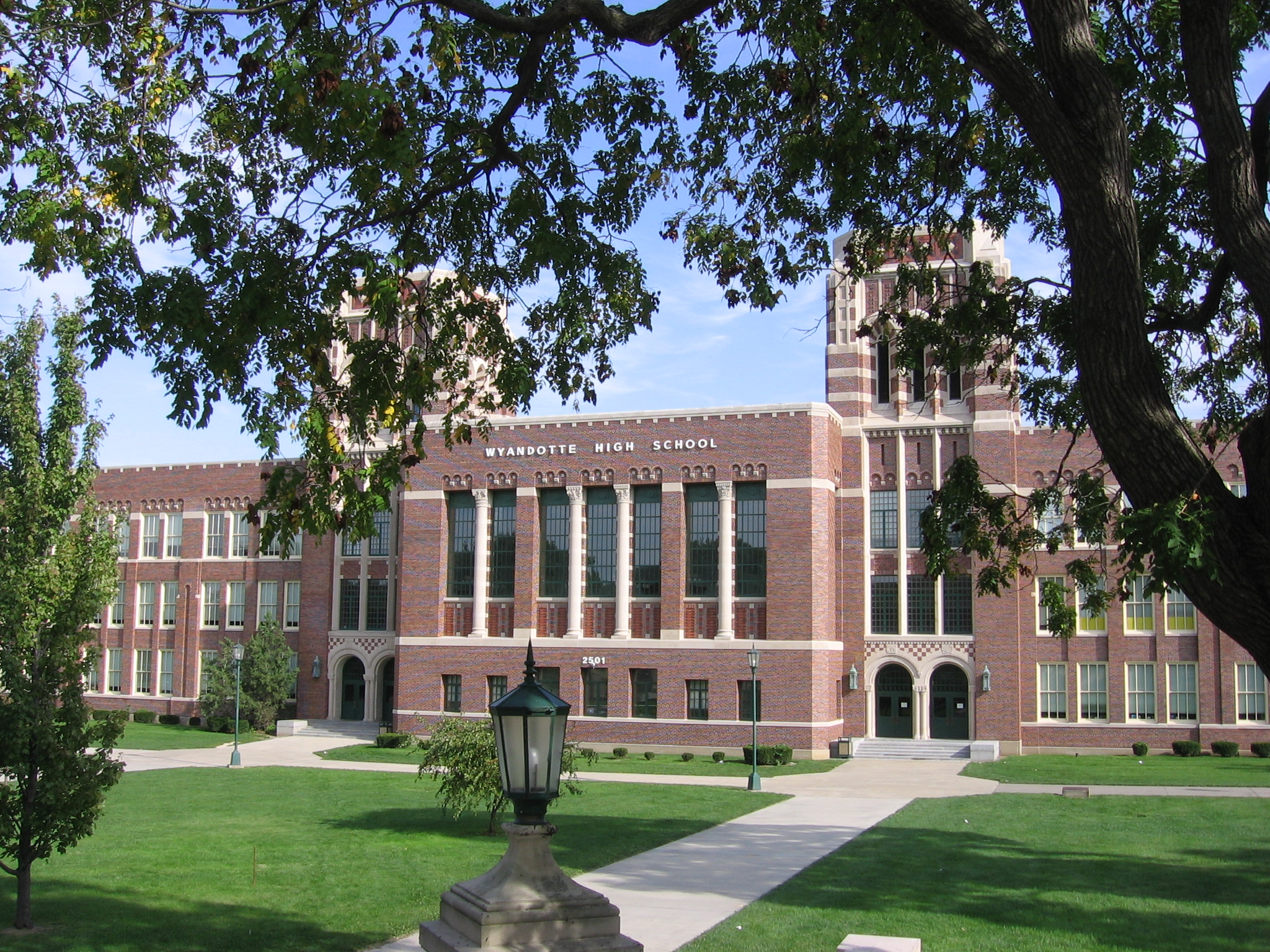

Location
- 2501 Minnesota Avenue; Kansas City, Kansas 66102; United States; 39°6′52″N 94°39′25″W

Information
- School type: Public, High school
- Established: 1886
- School board: School board website
- School district: Kansas City USD 500
- CEEB code: 171560
- Principal: Brian Guliford
- Grades: 9 to 12
- Gender: coed
- Enrollment: 1,903 (2024-2025)
- Schedule: Block scheduling
- Campus type: Urban
- Colors: Red; White
- Athletics: 6A
- Athletics conference: KCK-Atchison League
- Mascot: Bulldogs
- Rival: F.L. Schlagle High School, Washington High School, J.C. Harmon High School, Sumner Academy of Arts and Science
- Newspaper: Pantograph
- Yearbook: Quiverian
- Website: wyandotte.kckschools.org

- Wyandotte High School
- U.S. National Register of Historic Places
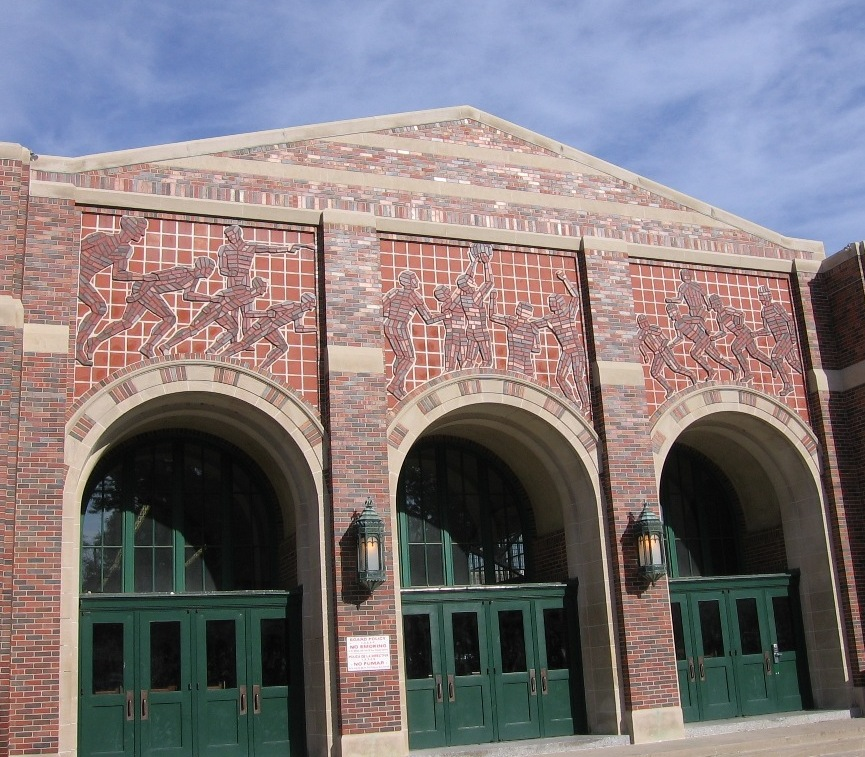
- Gym entrance
- Area: 24 acres (9.7 ha)
- Built: 1936
- Architect: Fellows Hamilton & Nedved
- Architectural style: Modern, Art Deco
- NRHP reference No.: 86000920
- Added to NRHP: April 30, 1986

Wyandotte High School is a fully accredited public high school located in Kansas City, Kansas, United States. It serves students in grades 9 to 12 and operated by the Kansas City USD 500 school district. The building itself is a historic and notable public building, which was listed on the National Register of Historic Places in 1986. The school principal is Brian Guliford. The mascot is the Bulldog and the school colors are red and white.

== History ==
On March 28, 1985, the school building was designated as a Kansas City, Kansas Historic Landmark. It was registered in Historic Kansas Places on November 23, 1985, and placed in the National Register of Historic Places on April 30, 1986. Stephen King's Sometimes They Come Back was filmed at Wyandotte.

== Extracurricular activities ==
The Bulldogs are classified as a 6A school, the largest classification in Kansas according to the Kansas State High School Activities Association. Wyandotte and J. C. Harmon High School are the only 6A schools in Kansas City USD 500 school district, and as such often finds themselves in postseason competition with schools from Lawrence, Olathe, Overland Park (Blue Valley School District) and Shawnee Mission. Throughout its history, Wyandotte has won over fifty state championships in various sports. Many graduates have gone on to participate in collegiate athletics.

=== Athletics ===
==== Basketball ====
The Bulldogs are known nationwide for winning 20 state titles in basketball including a 1923 undefeated national championship season in which the Bulldogs beat Rockford, Illinois, by a score of 43–21. One of the nation's most successful high school basketball coaches, Walter Shublom led Wyandotte High School of Kansas City, Kansas to 10 state championships and three second-place finishes in his 14 seasons there from 1955 to 1969. Shublom posted a 296–26 record (.919 winning percentage) at Wyandotte, with his 1957 and 1965 teams finishing unbeaten and another five teams finishing with just one loss. He and Wyandotte High School share a spot in the Basketball Hall of Fame in Springfield, Massachusetts, where they fall under the heading of high school dynasty. For ten straight seasons, from 1956 to 1965, Shublom's Bulldogs played in the state championship game. In seven of those years they were successful, including five straight years, 1957–1961. The basketball team also won a state championship in basketball in 1998.

==== Football ====
In November 2006, the football team made a playoff appearance for the first time since 1987, but suffered a loss to Saint Thomas Aquinas High School. Wyandotte's football teams have won the state championship six times, occurring in 1921 (9–0), 1923, 1932 (8-0-1 season), 1933 (9-0 co-champions), 1942 (10-0 season), and 1952 (9-0 season).

=== State championships ===
State Championships
Season	Sport	Number of championships	Year
Fall	Football	6*	1921, 1923, 1932, 1933, 1941, 1951
Fall	Cross country, Boys	1	1965
Winter	Swimming and diving, Boys	8	1934, 1937, 1938, 1943, 1944, 1945, 1947, 1968
Winter	Basketball, Boys	20	1923, 1930, 1933, 1941, 1955, 1957, 1958, 1959, 1960, 1961, 1964, 1965, 1967, 1968, 1969, 1970, 1976, 1984, 1985, 1998
Winter	Indoor track and field, Boys	8	1958, 1960, 1961, 1962, 1965, 1968, 1969, 1974, 1977
Winter	Indoor track and field, Girls	1	1975
Spring	Baseball	7	1922, 1941, 1952, 1953, 1954, 1962, 1964
Spring	Track & Field, Boys	7	1931, 1960, 1969, 1977, 1981, 1987, 1992
Spring	Track & Field, Girls	1	1988
Total		53	

- State football championships are not recognized by the KSHSAA prior to 1969. 1969 was the first year that the KSHSAA sponsored the football state championships. Adding the six state football titles would bring Wyandotte's total to 59.

== Wyandotte Pup ==
In the early 1930s, students built a two-seat monoplane aircraft designed by Noel Hockaday. It was called the Wyandotte Pup. The design rights were bought by the Porterfield Aircraft Corporation and the aircraft entered production as the Porterfield Flyabout.

== Notable alumni ==
- Boots Adams, former president of Phillips Petroleum Company
- Virginia Aderholdt, cryptanalyst and Japanese translator at Arlington Hall, who decrypted the intercepted Japanese surrender message, August 14, 1945.
- Lucius Allen, former UCLA & NBA player, third pick of 1969 NBA draft
- Edward Asner, actor, Elf, Up, The Mary Tyler Moore Show, Lou Grant, won seven Primetime Emmy Awards, most of any male actor in history
- Lyron Cobbins, former NFL and Notre Dame Fighting Irish All-American linebacker
- Larry Comley, former NBA professional basketball player
- Lucien Conein, intelligence officer for the Central Intelligence Agency
- Donald C. Cubbison, US Army major general
- Larry Drew, former head coach of the NBA Atlanta Hawks; former NBA player for multiple teams after playing in college for Missouri Tigers
- Nolen Ellison, University of Kansas basketball star and pioneering community college educator
- Ray Evans, former NFL player
- Tyrone Garner, mayor of Kansas City, Kansas
- Reggie Jones, former NFL player and NCAA track & Field relay champion
- Steve Renko, former MLB player (Montreal Expos, Chicago Cubs, Chicago White Sox, Oakland Athletics, Boston Red Sox, California Angels, Kansas City Royals)
- Pierre Russell, former Kansas Jayhawks and professional basketball player
- Skip Thomas, former NFL cornerback for Oakland Raiders after playing in college for USC
- Spencer Thomas, former NFL player
- Calvin Thompson, former Kansas Jayhawks and professional basketball player
- Dee Wallace, actress, E.T., The Howling, Cujo
- Cheryl Womack, entrepreneur

== See also ==
- List of high schools in Kansas
- List of unified school districts in Kansas

Other high schools in Kansas City USD 500 school district

- J. C. Harmon High School in Kansas City
- F. L. Schlagle High School in Kansas City
- Washington High School in Kansas City
- Sumner Academy of Arts and Science in Kansas City
