= John Strick =

American politician (1921–2009)

Member of the Kansas Senate from the 4th district
- In office 1985–1992
- Preceded by: Thomas Rehorn
- Succeeded by: Sherman Jones

Personal details
- Born: May 23, 1921
- Died: September 30, 2009 Kansas City, Kansas
- Party: Democratic
- Spouse: Elizabeth R. Macan
- Children: 4

John Strick Jr. (May 23, 1921 – September 30, 2009) was an American politician who served two terms in the Kansas State Senate from 1985 to 1992. He served 27 years as a pilot for the Naval Air Corps and the Naval Reserves, making commander in the latter part of his career. He had management positions in a number of industries and was a commercial pilot for Trans World Airlines.

== Biography ==
John Strick Jr. was born on in Kansas City, Kansas to John H. and Veronica (nee Kancelarysty) Strick. He graduated from Kansas State University.

Strick served as a pilot for the Naval Air Corps and the Naval Reserves for 27 years. He retired as a commander. He was employed as a project director and central relocation director at the Urban Renewal Agency of Kansas City, Kansas; sales manager at Fordyce Concrete; general manager of Stewart Sand and Material Company; assistant district traffic and sales manager for Continental Air Lines; and as a commercial pilot for Trans World Airlines.

Strick married Elizabeth R. Macan and together they had four children: John, Gregory, Marion, and Mary. Strick died on September 30, 2009, at Kansas City Hospice House and was buried at Mt. Calvary Cemetery Mausoleum, Kansas City, Kansas.
