= Sherman Jones =

American baseball player (1935–2007)

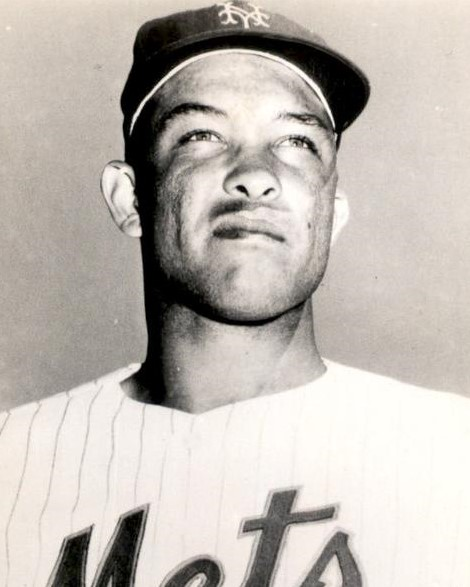
- Pitcher
- Born: February 10, 1935; Winton, North Carolina, U.S.
- Died: February 21, 2007 (aged 72); Kansas City, Kansas, U.S.
- Batted: Left Threw: Right

MLB debut
- August 2, 1960, for the San Francisco Giants

Last MLB appearance
- September 9, 1962, for the New York Mets

MLB statistics
- Win–loss record: 2–6
- Earned run average: 4.73
- Innings pitched: 110 1/3
- Stats at Baseball Reference

Teams
- San Francisco Giants (1960); Cincinnati Reds (1961); New York Mets (1962)

Career highlights and awards
- Appeared in 1961 World Series

Sherman Jones

Member of the Kansas Senate from the 4th district
- In office 1993–2000
- Preceded by: John Strick
- Succeeded by: David Haley

Member of the Kansas House of Representatives from the 35th district
- In office 1989–1992

Personal details
- Party: Democrat

Sherman Jarvis Jones (February 10, 1935 – February 21, 2007), nicknamed "Roadblock", was an American right-handed pitcher in Major League Baseball who went on to a career in Kansas politics. He was listed at 6 feet 4 inches (1.93 m) tall and 205 pounds (93 kg).

== Baseball career ==
Born in Winton, North Carolina, Jones played from 1960 to 1962 for the San Francisco Giants, Cincinnati Reds and New York Mets. He appeared in Game 5 of the 1961 World Series for the Reds against the New York Yankees, retiring Clete Boyer and Bud Daley, the only two Yankees he faced. Jones posted a career record of two wins and six losses, with four saves, 53 strikeouts and a 4.73 earned run average in 48 games. His 12-year pro career extended from 1953 to 1958 and 1960–65; in addition to his time in the major leagues, Jones played in the minor leagues and in Venezuela.

== Later life and politics ==
After leaving baseball, he served in the Kansas City Police Department for 22 years. Jones was later elected to the Kansas Legislature from Wyandotte County, serving in the House of Representatives from 1989 to 1992 and in the Senate from 1993 to 2000.

== Personal life ==
Jones married Amelia Buchanan on December 16, 1956. He died at age 72 at the University of Kansas Medical Center.
