= Cheryl Womack =

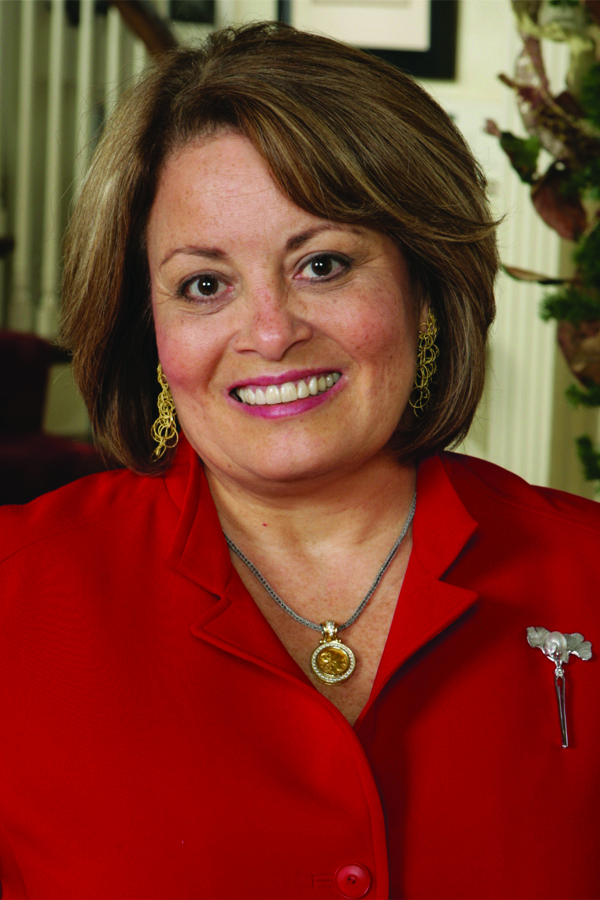
Cheryl Womack - headshot

Verna Cheryl Womack (born December 31, 1950) is an entrepreneur who founded Kansas City, Missouri-based VCW and National Association of Independent Truckers, Inc. which became a $100 million a year business selling insurance to independent truckers before selling the companies to private equity investors Clayton, Dubilier & Rice. She become a major philanthropist in the Kansas City area. Among her donations was $2 million to the University of Kansas to build Arrocha Ballpark which is named for her father Demostenes Arrocha.

== Early life ==
Womack was born in Kansas City, Kansas. She was the third of 11 children to her Panama-immigrant father and American mother. She attended Wyandotte High School and received a bachelor in education from the University of Kansas in 1975. Following graduation she taught elementary school for a year and worked at a trucking insurance company.

After failing to be promoted, she started the National Association of Independent Truckers in the basement of her home in 1981. She started the National Association of Independent Truckers to fill a niche need for the independent contractors. Truckers who paid a membership got discounts on various products. In 1983 and more lucratively she created VCW to sell customized insurance policies to truckers. "I listened to what the independent truckers complained about, and I solved their problems," she said. "I created something and said, 'Here's what you asked for.'

== Sale to SIRVA ==
By the time she sold the companies, there were 12,000 members. She was 100 percent owner. The sale to SIRVA from NAIT was reported to have been for $100 million. (although SEC filings indicate the price was closer to $40 million). SIRVA would sell the insurance business along with Transguard Insurance Company of America, Inc. and Vanguard Insurance Agency, Inc. to IAT Reinsurance Company Ltd. in 2005.

Since the sale, her new VCW Holding investments include The Star Group team in program and partnership development for annual events recognizing and honoring the, Leading Women Entrepreneurs of the World and participates in mentoring programs sponsored by The Kauffman Foundation for Entrepreneurial Leadership, The Committee of 200, Harvard University's John F. Kennedy School of Government, and the Women's Leadership Board.

== Business Interests ==
- President & CEO, The Star Group
- Chair, The Leading Women Entrepreneurs of the World, Inc. – 501 (c) 3
- President & CEO, VCW Holding Company, L.L.C.
- CEO, R&A Properties, L.L.C.
- Member, W & P Development, L.L.C.
