= Skip Thomas =

American football player (1950–2011)

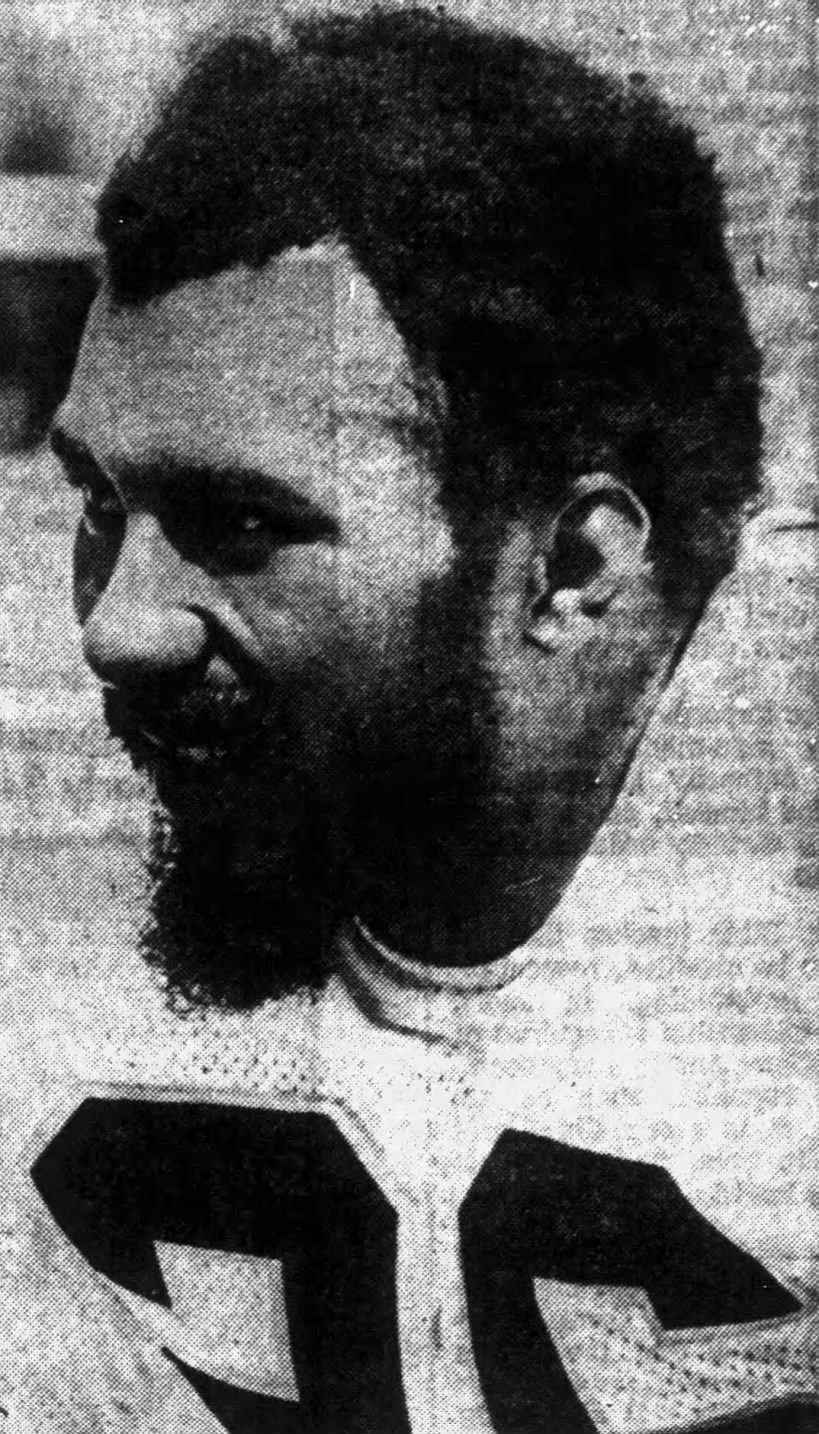
- Skip Thomas c. 1972

No. 26
- Position: Cornerback

Personal information
- Born: February 7, 1950; Higginsville, Missouri, U.S.
- Died: July 24, 2011 (aged 61); Kansas, U.S.
- Listed height: 6 ft 1 in (1.85 m)
- Listed weight: 205 lb (93 kg)

Career information
- High school: Kansas City (KS) Wyandotte
- College: Arizona Western Junior College; Southern California
- NFL draft: 1972: 7th round, 176th overall pick

Career history
- Oakland Raiders (1972–1977)

Awards and highlights
- Super Bowl champion (XI)

Career NFL statistics
- Interceptions: 17
- Interception yards: 222
- Touchdowns: 1
- Stats at Pro Football Reference

Alonzo "Skip" Thomas III (February 7, 1950 – July 24, 2011), nicknamed "Dr. Death", was an American professional football player. A cornerback, Thomas played college football at Arizona Western Junior College before transferring to the University of Southern California. After college, he spent six seasons with the Oakland Raiders of the National Football League (NFL) before retiring from football.

Thomas was a part of the Raiders' Super Bowl XI winning team, and a notable figure in the "Soul Patrol" defensive secondary of the 1970s. Alongside cornerback Willie Brown and safeties Jack Tatum and George Atkinson, the quartet were known for their physicality. Thomas' harsh style on the field is well documented, though he is remembered as the most subdued of the four.

== Early life ==
Alonzo "Skip" Thomas III was born on February 7, 1950, in Higginsville, Missouri. He was given the nickname "Skip" by his grandfather, Alonzo Thomas Sr., to avoid confusion. He attended Wyandotte High School where he was a star football and basketball player. He was a highly lauded guard in basketball winning several local honors and a state championships with his team during his junior and senior years, playing for Hall of Fame coach Walter Shublom.. He graduated high school in 1968.

== College career ==
Thomas first played football at Arizona Western Junior College, where he played with another Raider's draft pick from the same year, Phil Price. After earning All American Junior College Honors, Thomas played college football at the University of Southern California where he was a defensive back and a punt returner. Thomas originally intended to transfer to Kansas State University, but did not pursue the opportunity due to apparent miscommunications with Wildcat coach Vince Gibson.

Southern California allowed Thomas to play both basketball and football, a driving reason for why Thomas chose USC over other offers. While playing both sports he also competed in decathlons. He primarily focused on playing basketball until an ankle injury sidelined him during his junior year. His senior year he focused on playing football and posted 58 tackles, 10 pass deflections and 5 interceptions.

== Professional career ==
Thomas was selected in the seventh round by the Oakland Raiders with the 176th overall pick in the 1972 NFL draft. He went on to play for the Oakland Raiders for the entire duration of his professional football career between 1972 and 1977 as a member of the Raiders' infamous "Soul Patrol" secondary, known for their physicality and harsh play-style.

Before the draft, Raiders safety George Atkinson worked out with Thomas, where Thomas reportedly saw great skill from the defender. Head coach John Madden chose to draft him based on his determination, size, and ability. An early talent during the preseason, he was referred to as the Raiders' best all around athlete, standing at 6 foot two inches and 206 pounds. Thomas recurringly played during the preseason to modest success, even replacing future Hall of Famer Willie Brown during a game against the Dallas Cowboys.

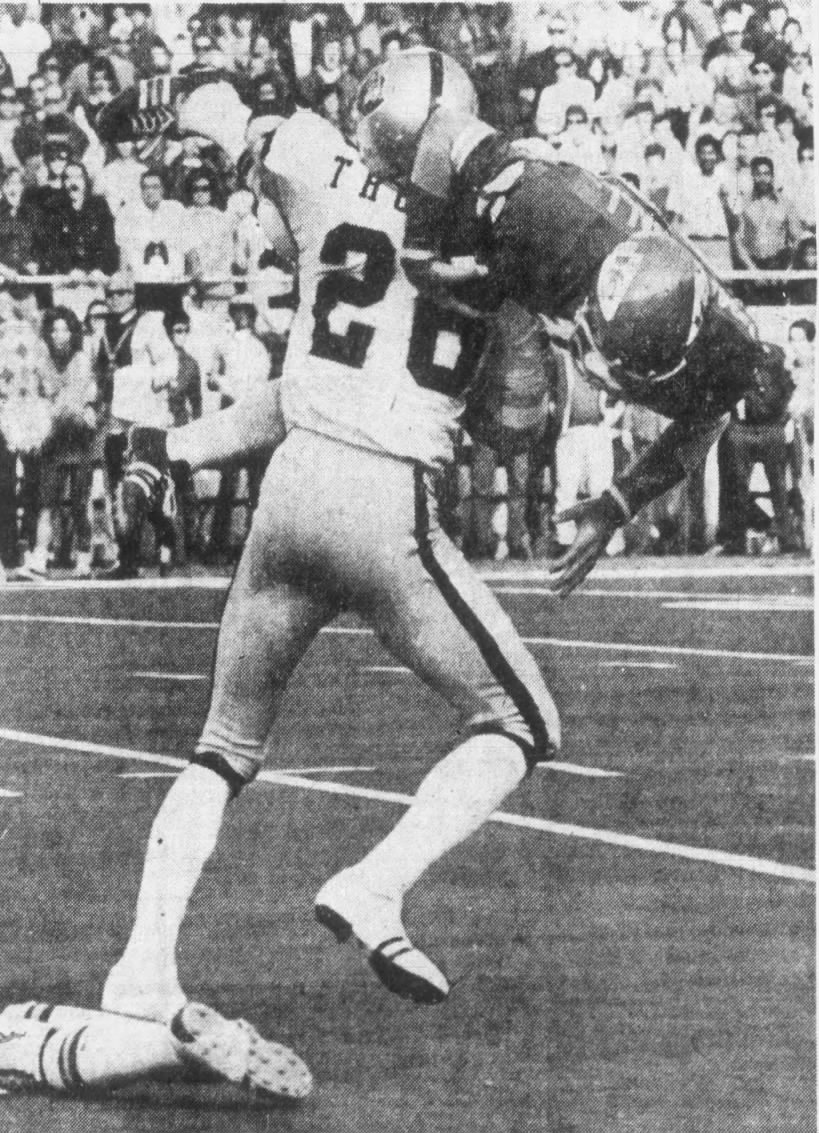
Skip Thomas, tackling Larry Marshall in a November 1972 game against the Kansas City Chiefs.

=== 1972–73 seasons ===
During his rookie season, Thomas primarily played on special teams while serving as a backup to Atkinson and fellow cornerback Nemiah Wilson. Thomas became part of a growing number of young Raiders players who were supplanting several of the veterans of the team. In a 45–17 win against the Los Angeles Rams during week 7, Thomas forced a fumble on the opening kickoff.

Thomas saw more regular play during his sophomore 1973 season. Thomas began subbing in for Nemiah Wilson during preseason practices while the latter worked on contract negotiations. While it was clear Wilson would replace Thomas when he returned, John Madden planned on incorporating Thomas as a versatile part of the defense, a fifth defensive position that Madden referred to as the "pirate". The Raiders also experimented with having Thomas play at the running back position during the off season. Thomas hauled in two interceptions across the 1973 season. The first came off of a pass deflected by Willie Brown during a game against the Baltimore Colts, while the second was a game-winning interception to end the Raiders' final game of the season against the Denver Broncos.

=== 1974–75 seasons ===
Thomas broke a National Football League Players Association strike to practice with the Raiders during the 1974 preseason. The season marked the closest Thomas had gotten to replacing Nemiah Wilson as the starting cornerback for the Raiders. Early reports showed that the debate was going in Thomas' favor, with Thomas starting during preseason games. The rivalry was complicated by the pair's friendship. Thomas refrained from speaking on the situation for fear of hurting himself or others with his statements. Both players reported being uninformed on what the Raiders management and staff's decision would be, though it was clear Thomas would start in the season opener against the Buffalo Bills since Wilson was suffering from a sprained ankle. He went on to start in every game of the 1974 season, a first in his career. Wilson was left upset at the Raiders organization over this and their previous contract disputes, leading to his trade to the Chicago Bears for an undisclosed draft pick in April 1975.

Fellow Raiders player Jimmy Warren described the 1974 season as Thomas's "super year". He wrestled a ball out of the hands of receiver Danny Abramowicz and into the hands of Raiders defender Dan Conners for an interception in an October game against the San Francisco 49ers. In a November game that season against the San Diego Chargers, Thomas batted away a last-minute pass from Dan Fouts to win the game, all while suffering from a neck injury. He had six interceptions in the season, with two of his interceptions coming from a September game against the Kansas City Chiefs. He had his first interception returned for a touchdown on December 1, 1974, in a game against the New England Patriots. Thomas had intercepted Jim Plunkett at the top of the fourth quarter, running 22 yards into the endzone.

Thomas followed this performance up with another six-interception season in 1975. He had another two-interception game in a 6–0 win against the Chargers in October. In the last seconds of a December game against the Houston Oilers, Thomas intercepted quarterback Dan Pastorini in the endzone. This would have been the game-winning play had it not been called back after Phil Villapiano received a holding penalty. The Oilers went on to score and win 27–26 against the Raiders. Villapiano called it "the worst call I've had against me in five years of pro ball". The Raiders made it to the playoffs that season. While the Raiders beat the Cincinnati Bengals in their first playoff game, they would lose the AFC Championship game against the Pittsburgh Steelers and miss out on Super Bowl X.

=== 1976–77 seasons ===
The Raiders would go on to win Super Bowl XI the following season in 1976. Thomas played an important role in the Raiders' success that season. He had a game-winning interception in an October match against the Green Bay Packers. In the eventual playoff run, Thomas intercepted a Steve Grogan pass during their game against the New England Patriots. The Raiders would go on to beat the Steelers in their AFC Championship rematch 24–7 before defeating the Minnesota Vikings in Super Bowl XI. Thomas was called the standout from the secondary, keeping rookie receiver Sammy White at bay, knocking his helmet off twice.

The following 1977 season was mostly uneventful for Thomas, who started the season in rough condition. By week 6 he had been beaten four times on touchdown passes, and gave up 178 passing yards against the New York Jets in one game, getting burned several times on deep passes from Richard Todd to Wesley Walker. He missed a late-season game against the Buffalo Bills after a leg injury, and was noticeably afflicted with several other injuries from that point forward. Thomas was replaced as a starter by rookie Lester Hayes, who would hold that distinction through 1986. He then moved to safety to cover for an injured George Atkinson in the last game of the season. This position shift lasted through playoff games against the Baltimore Colts and the Denver Broncos, to little success.

=== Cut from the Raiders ===
During a routine blood test during the 1978 preseason, Thomas' blood test results came back "abnormal". It turned out to be a case of hepatitis, which led to Thomas missing much of training camp. This, coupled with Hayes' performance in the preseason, led to Thomas being cut from the Raiders. He was claimed off of waivers by the Buffalo Bills, but failed his physical with the team and was not signed.

== Legacy ==
Thomas was nicknamed "Doctor Death" throughout the majority of his professional career. He was a cornerback who Phil Villapiano called "the size of a linebacker". He would out-muscle most opponents, and throw them to the ground often. It was said he would "hit anything that moves" and insult people whether he liked or disliked them. Though he was unpopular with other NFL players and seen as a threat in the locker room, Lynn Swann described him as the only Raiders defensive back who wouldn't take cheap shots. Thomas' efforts on the Soul Patrol were understated, and he has not been as well remembered as the other members.

The origin of the "Doctor Death" nickname is disputed. John Madden tells a story in his memoir Hey, Wait a Minute, I Wrote A Book! of Hall of Fame lineman Bob "Boomer" Brown first referring to Thomas as "Dr. Death" due to his appearance. Sportswriter Peter Richmond asserts the story is apocryphal. Thomas himself states that the nickname came from his spontaneous nature.

Thomas drove a white Chevrolet Corvette with his name inscribed on each side alongside his "Doctor Death" nickname. He totaled his Corvette during the 1977 season, causing a bump on his head so large he couldn't wear his helmet for a week.

== Personal life ==
After his NFL career, Thomas worked as a detention officer in Wyandotte County. He also worked at one point as an exterminator. He pawned off his Super Bowl ring in order to earn enough money to save his house from being sold, though the attempt was unsuccessful. He also sold a trophy that he received from the city of Oakland.

Thomas rode motorcycles throughout his career, with John Matuszak referring to him as a "Black Evel Knievel". At one point John Madden barred him from riding his motorcycles during practices as they were causing disruptions. He and George Atkinson recounted stories of Thomas riding his motorcycle to local hospitals after practice to make sure he was healthy enough for games on Sunday, and to play strip poker with the nurses. After his retirement, he pursued his passion for cars and motorcycles, focusing on repairing his 1936 Ford and his father's cars.

Thomas was married to Harriet Sims. The couple had one son, Brandon, alongside Thomas' five other children. One of Thomas' children was born on the same day as his Super Bowl win. Thomas died of a heart attack in Kansas on July 24, 2011, aged 61. He was in poor health and had needed personal assistance in his later years. Following his death, tributes came out from rival Terry Bradshaw and fellow Soul Patrol teammate Willie Brown.
