= David Haley =

American politician (born 1958)

Member of the Kansas Senate from the 4th district
- Incumbent
- Assumed office January 8, 2001
- Preceded by: Sherman Jones

Member of the Kansas House of Representatives from the 34th district
- In office January 9, 1995 – January 8, 2001
- Preceded by: Robert Watson
- Succeeded by: Valdenia Winn

Personal details
- Born: October 29, 1958 (age 67) Kansas City, Kansas, U.S.
- Party: Democratic
- Education: Morehouse College, Howard University (J.D.)
- Profession: Attorney

David B. Haley (born October 29, 1958) is a Democratic member of the Kansas Senate, representing the 4th district (Kansas City, Kansas / eastern Wyandotte County) since 2001. From 1995 to 2001, he was a Kansas Representative. He ran unsuccessfully for Kansas Secretary of State in 2002 and 2006.

Haley (by 2023), became the longest-serving member currently in the Kansas Senate. As of February, 2025, he remains in office.

He is the son of politician George W. Haley and nephew of Pulitzer Prize winner Alex Haley.

== Early life and education ==
Haley was raised in Wyandotte County, Kansas (part of metropolitan Kansas City, Kansas). Haley's father, George W. Haley, was one of Kansas' first African-American state legislators—the first African-American ever elected to the Kansas Senate—and in the 1990s and early 2000s, the U.S. Ambassador to The Gambia. His mother, Doris, was a schoolteacher. Haley's uncle was Pulitzer Prize winner, Alex Haley (author of the influential African-American historical novel Roots and its associated historic TV mini-series, and co-author of The Autobiography of Malcolm X).

The younger Haley attended his father's alma mater, Morehouse College in Atlanta. He later graduated from Howard University law school in Washington, D.C., before returning to Wyandotte County.

== Political career ==
Haley first ran for a seat in the Kansas House of Representatives in 1994. When he won the primary election for that seat, the incumbent resigned and Haley was appointed to fill out his predecessor's term. Haley won the general election for that seat, and continued in the House until elected to the Senate in 2001.

Haley represents the 4th Kansas Senate District. Both his House and Senate districts have been in demographically-diverse (largely African-American) Wyandotte County, in the metropolitan Kansas City area. The district is one of one of state's the poorest districts (16% of the county's residents live in poverty), and one of the most diverse—racially and ethnically—in Kansas. Residents are 43% Black, 37% white, and about 24% Hispanic.

In February, 2025, Haley was the subject of intense political attention, when he threatened to become the lone Democrat to vote with Republicans to provide a crucial swing vote to override Governor Laura Kelly's veto of a controversial flat tax bill, which had been passed by the Senate's large Republican majority. Haley explained that, for his low-income district, which had seen little infusion of tax dollars by either Republicans, or by Democrat governors, the bill (which included exemptions for personal income under $6,000) neither hurt nor helped his district. Seen as a power-play, his position on the issue generated great pressure on him from both parties, each side threatening retribution for an opposing vote.

== Issue positions ==
Haley has advocated for criminal justice reforms (including abolition of the death penalty), the legalization of marijuana, and constantly urged increased investment in eastern Wyandotte County.

Party political offices
Preceded by Don M. Rezac	Democratic nominee for Secretary of State of Kansas; 2002, 2006	Succeeded by Chris Biggs
