= Spencer Thomas =

American football player (born 1951)

No. 24, 46
- Position: Safety

Personal information
- Born: March 9, 1951 (age 75); Kansas City, Kansas, U.S.
- Listed height: 6 ft 2 in (1.88 m)
- Listed weight: 185 lb (84 kg)

Career information
- High school: Wyandotte
- College: Washburn (basketball)
- NFL draft: 1975: undrafted

Career history
- Washington Redskins (1975); Baltimore Colts (1976)
- Stats at Pro Football Reference

Spencer Lee Thomas (born March 9, 1951) is an American former professional football player who was a safety in the National Football League (NFL) for the Washington Redskins and the Baltimore Colts. He played college basketball for the Washburn Ichabod, and did not play college football, but joined the Redskins after a tryout in Topeka and then later played for the Baltimore Colts.
