= Sagir Arce =

Professional footballer (born 2002)

Personal information
- Full name: Sagir David Arce Chávez
- Date of birth: February 15, 2002 (age 24)
- Place of birth: Kansas City, Missouri, United States
- Height: 1.70 m (5 ft 7 in)
- Position: Attacking midfielder

Team information
- Current team: Halcones
- Number: 29

Youth career
- 2019: Monarcas Academy

Senior career*
Years	Team	Apps	(Gls)
2019–2020	Morelia	1	(0)
2020–2023	Mazatlán	13	(0)
2022	→ Minnesota United FC 2 (loan)	10	(2)
2023	→ Durango (loan)	7	(0)
2024–2025	Atlético San Luis	0	(0)
2026–	Halcones	1	(0)

International career
2018	United States U17	9	(1)
2021	Mexico U21	1	(0)
- * Club domestic league appearances and goals as of 12:11, 19 September 2022 (UTC)

Sagir David Arce Chávez (born February 15, 2002) is a professional footballer who plays as an attacking midfielder for Liga Premier de México team Halcones. Born in the United States, he played for the Mexico national under-21 team.

== Career ==
=== Club ===
Arce made his professional debut on September 3, 2019, when he replaced Fernando Aristeguieta in the 77th minute of a 2–0 Copa MX win at home against Cimarrones de Sonora. On September 25, 2019, Arce debuted in the Liga MX when he came in for Aldo Rocha in the 81st minute of a 3–2 defeat to Club Tijuana.

=== International ===
Due to his dual citizenship, Arce is eligible to represent both Mexico and the United States. He reportedly decided to represent the United States and has been part of several United States U17 camps since 2018, playing for the team on several friendly matches and youth tournaments.

== Career statistics ==
=== Club ===
As of 14 August 2022

Club	Season	League			Cup		Continental		Other		Total	
Club	Season	Division	Apps	Goals	Apps	Goals	Apps	Goals	Apps	Goals	Apps	Goals
Morelia	2019–20	Liga MX	1	0	3	0	–		–		4	0
Mazatlán	2020–21	Liga MX	1	0	—		—		—		1	0
Mazatlán	2021–22	Liga MX	12	0	—		—		—		12	0
Mazatlán	Total		13	0	0	0	0	0	0	0	13	0
Minnesota United FC 2 (loan)	2022	MLS Next Pro	5	1	—		—		—		5	1
Career total			19	1	3	0	0	0	0	0	22	1
