= Vigalantee =

American rapper

- Born: Roger Suggs; Chicago, U.S.
- Genres: Hip hop
- Occupations: Rapper; activist; songwriter; record producer
- Years active: 1993–present
- Website: Official channel on YouTube

Roger Suggs, better known as the rapper Vigalantee, is an American emcee, speaker, and social activist based in Kansas City, Kansas. Through his music and activism, Vigalantee has worked for human, civil, and labor rights, as well as outreach programs designed to keep local youths out of prison. Vigalantee owns PhatAhDat Records, an independent label. He has stated in interviews that he took the name "Vigalantee" from the comic book character Spider-Man, who attempts to help people but is still constantly under the threat of police arrest.

== Biography ==
=== Early life ===
Vigalantee was born in Chicago, but spent the majority of his childhood in a small town in Georgia, where he experienced racism and segregation. He recalls watching his grandfather "walking like a sharecropper," and living close to poverty, which made him feel like a second-class citizen. He later realized that his experience was shared by many blacks living in the South, and decided that if blacks could have a shared experience of oppression, they could develop a common agenda and a solid community to confront de facto racism. In interviews, he often references these painful memories and realizations as the backbone of his present-day activism.

== Musical career ==
Vigalantee has been performing professionally since 1993.

=== Style and influence ===
Vigalantee's' stylistic signature is the use of acronyms in titles of his albums and songs, such as M.I.S.E.R.Y. and A.N.I.M.A.L. Referred to as the Acronym King, Suggs believes acronyms are easier for the intended recipients of his message. "People relate to it better and it sticks to the mind easier," he has said.

Vigalantee has been influenced by artists including Curtis Mayfield and Canibus. He has said that music is a gateway to establishing social change, and considers that these artists both educate and entertain their listeners. Lyrically, he cites Chuck D, LL Cool J, and Poor Righteous Teachers as influences.

He has written an autobiography, The Greatest Story That was Never Heard Til Now, and a poetry collection, Love, Lust, Defeat, Deceit.

=== Social and political views ===
Vigalantee makes political and social statements through his music, considering this a way to critique social inequalities and establish change. His songs focus on themes of poverty, racism, prejudice, sexism, religion, murder, justice, religion, civil rights, and politics. He has written a song about Emmett Till, who was lynched in Mississippi in 1955 and whose death was influential on the civil rights movement.

Vigalantee has also spoken out about the treatment of women by entertainment and the media, including in hip-hop. He focused on this topic in his album A Second is a Lifetime, in particular the single "Beautiful Black Woman".

=== No Jaangle and F.B.O.E. ===
Since 1994, Vigalantee has owned and operated the independent record label PhatAhDat Records. He has also established the No Jaangle Movement, which challenges young people to combat the stigma of "bojangling," a negative stereotype affecting minority youths. He said that the initiative "means never compromising who you are, and realizing that you don't have to be ignorant to be successful. It also means respecting and recognizing those who've walked before you, taking the black face of shame off".

Vigalantee is the co-founder of the Fringe Benefits Of Education, a program aiming to help young people around Kansas City achieve their dreams.

== Discography ==
- Poor Man Story
- No Jaangle Movement
- A.N.I.M.A.L (A Nation in Misery Alienated and Lost)
- M.I.R.A.C.L.E (Music Inspiring Real Accomplishment Creating Love Everlasting)
- A Second is a Lifetime

== Film work ==
- Kansas City (1996 film)
