= William P. Foster =

American bandmaster, composer, and author (1919–2010)

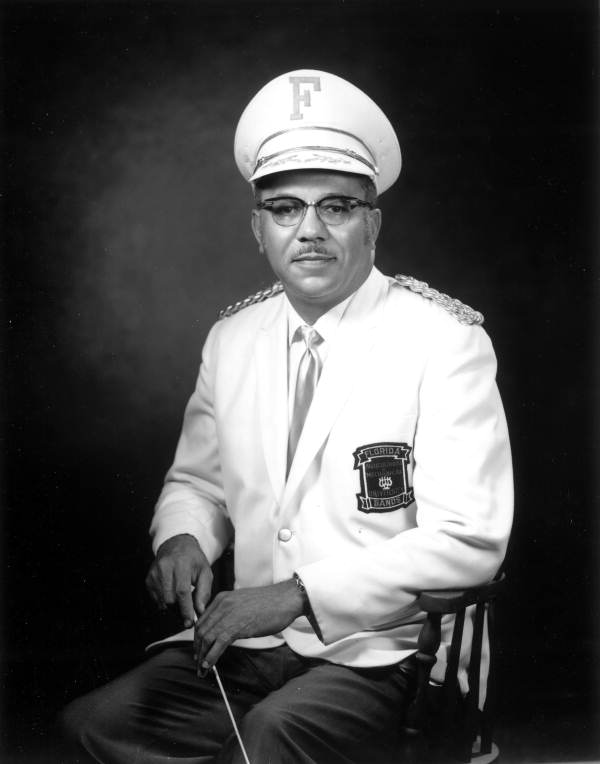
- Foster in 1969
- Born: August 25, 1919; Kansas City, Kansas
- Died: August 28, 2010 (aged 91)
- Spouse: Mary Ann (died in 2007)
- Children: 2

William Patrick Foster (August 25, 1919 – August 28, 2010), also known as The Law and The Maestro, was the director of the noted Florida A&M University Marching "100". He served as the band's director from 1946 to his retirement in 1998. His innovations revolutionized college marching band technique and the perceptions of the collegiate band. Foster was inducted into the Florida Artists Hall of Fame, the National Association for Distinguished Band Conductors Hall of Fame, the Florida Music Educators Association Hall of Fame and the Afro-American Hall of Fame among others. He also served as the president of the American Bandmasters Association and was appointed to the National Council on the Arts by President Bill Clinton. Foster wrote the book titled The Man Behind the Baton.

== Early life ==
Foster was born on August 25, 1919 in Kansas City, Kansas. He was the youngest of four children. His mother was a homemaker, and his father was a railway mail clerk. Foster's family suffered poverty.

At age 12, Foster began his music career by buying and learning to play the saxophone and later the clarinet, cello, and cornet. None of his family had the same interest of music that Foster did.

== Education ==
While in high school, his talent was recognized and he was appointed student director of the Sumner High School Orchestra, in Kansas City, Kansas. In 1936, he became the director of an all-city band. Foster was a fellow of the Rosenwald General Education Board at Teacher's College, Columbia University, 1953–1955 for Doctorate Studies. He received his Bachelor of Music Education Degree from the University of Kansas in 1941, a Master of Arts in Music Degree from Wayne State University in 1950, a Doctor of Education Degree with a major in music from Teachers College, Columbia University in 1955, and an Honorary Doctor of Human Letters Degree in 1998 from Florida A&M University. He became a member of Phi Mu Alpha Sinfonia in 1953 at Columbia University.

== The Marching "100" ==
The original FAMU Band was organized in 1892 under the leadership of P.A. Van Weller. At that time, the school was still known as the State Normal and Industrial College for Colored Students. When Foster became the director of bands in 1946, the school was known as the Florida Agricultural and Mechanical College for Negroes. Foster brought over 30 new techniques to the band, which have now become standard procedure for high school and college bands nationwide.

Under his direction, the Marching "100" appeared in films, commercials, numerous magazine and newspaper articles, nationally televised performances. In 1989, the French chose Foster and his band as America's official representative in the Bastille Day Parade, celebrating the bicentennial of the French Revolution. On January 27, 1996, the Marching "100" was the center-piece of the Opening Ceremonies of the Walt Disney Indy 200. The Band was also the featured attraction at the Fifteenth and Twenty-fifth Anniversary National Telecast of Walt Disney World in 1986 and 1996. In January 1993 and 1997, the band appeared in the Inaugural Parade of President Bill Clinton.

== Innovation of techniques ==
The collective style of the FAMU marching band evolved by happenstance during band practice in 1946. "Our first dance routine, I don't know how or why it came about," said Foster, in his book Band Pageantry, A Guide for the Marching Band. Foster's break with tradition was a fanfare that trumpeted the changing of the guard in marching band style and forever changed the look, feel and emotion associated with halftime performances. The block, militaristic, corps style immediately became secondary to Foster's upbeat, high-energy shows and, by the '60s, bands such as Grambling, Southern and Tennessee State in addition to Florida A&M began to garner national attention.

Foster's innovations made for a quantum leap for a U.S. marching band scene, which had already witnessed lagging interest in live band concerts as the numbers of radio and vinyl-record fans began to soar. While educators saw bands as a way to teach music to large numbers of students, few college bands existed around the turn of the century. Those that did were usually either small and informal club-like organizations modeled on the community bands, or ROTC bands modeled on the music of the military.

"I don't know what possessed me to go to the dean's office, but I was there and he asked me what I wanted to do," recalled Foster in his book on marching band technique. "I told him I wanted to be a conductor, but he said, 'You should rethink that. There are no jobs for colored conductors.' And he was right! So I wanted to develop a band that would be better than any white band in the country."

At FAMU, Foster began redefining band pageantry with a showy style—rapid tempos, high-stepping, dancing, etc., which was eschewed by some band directors who continued to cling to more staid military tradition and its emphasis on correct carriage and marching precision.

Foster has been credited with developing at least 30 new marching band techniques, including the double-time marching step of 240 steps per minute or four steps per second, and the triple-time marching step of 360 steps per minute, the death-slow cadence of 20 steps per minute or one step every three seconds, and memorization of all music played in stands, parades, pre-game and halftime shows.

== Other achievements ==
Foster authored 18 articles for professional journals, 4 published marching band shows, and the textbook, Band Pageantry, considered "The Bible" for the marching band. He is the composer of Marche Brillante, National Honors March, March Continental, and Centennial Celebration.

Foster was the first recipient of the United States Achievement Academy Hall of Fame Award and the Outstanding Educator Award presented by the School of Education Society of the University of Kansas Alumni Association. In 1992, Sports Illustrated declared The 100 as the best marching band in the country. In 1998, Foster was inducted as a Great Floridian by the Museum of Florida History. He was also a director of the prestigious McDonald's All-American High School Band (1980–1992).

President Bill Clinton nominated and the United States Congress approved Foster as a member of the National Council on the Arts. Foster was a member of the Hall of Fame of the following organizations: Music Educators National Conference; the Florida Music Educators Association, Florida A&M University Sports, the National High School Band Directors, and the Afro-American Hall of Fame.

He was a board member with G. Leblanc Corporation, John Philip Sousa Foundation, International Music Festival, Inc., and the Marching Musician. On December 17, 1998, the Board of Electors in Chicago, Illinois elected Foster to the National Band Association Hall of Fame of Distinguished Band Conductors, the most prestigious honor a bandmaster can receive.

== Later personal life and death ==
Foster’s and his wife, Mary Ann, had two sons, William and Anthony. Mary died in 2007. Foster also has four grand-children and five great-grandchildren.

On August 23, 2010, Foster, who had been a resident of Miracle Hill nursing home in Tallahassee, Florida, was admitted to Tallahassee Memorial Hospital's Intensive Care Unit. He died on August 28, 2010, at 12:01 am. His funeral was held in Florida A&M University's Lee Hall on September 4, 2010. He was 91 years old.
