= Larry Comley =

American basketball player

Personal information
- Born: August 17, 1939 Kansas City, Kansas, U.S.
- Died: January 21, 2006 (aged 66)
- Listed height: 6 ft 5 in (1.96 m)
- Listed weight: 210 lb (95 kg)

Career information
- High school: Wyandotte (Kansas City, Kansas)
- College: Kansas State (1958–1961)
- NBA draft: 1961: 10th round, 91st overall pick
- Drafted by: Chicago Packers
- Playing career: 1961–1963
- Position: Guard
- Number: 52

Career history
- 1961–1962: Kansas City Steers
- 1963: Baltimore Bullets
- 1963–1964: Wilmington Blue Bombers

Career highlights
- First-team All-Big Eight (1961)

Career NBA statistics
- Points: 25 (2.1 ppg)
- Rebounds: 19 (1.6 ppg)
- Assists: 12 (1.0 apg)
- Stats at NBA.com
- Stats at Basketball Reference

Lawrence Robert Comley (August 17, 1939 – January 21, 2006) was an American professional basketball player. Comley was selected in the 1961 NBA draft by the Chicago Packers after a collegiate career at Kansas State. He played for the Baltimore Bullets in the 1963–64 season and appeared in 12 total games.

== Career statistics ==
Legend
GP	Games played	GS	Games started	MPG	Minutes per game
FG%	Field goal percentage	3P%	3-point field goal percentage	FT%	Free throw percentage
RPG	Rebounds per game	APG	Assists per game	SPG	Steals per game
BPG	Blocks per game	PPG	Points per game	**Bold**	Career high

=== NBA ===
==== Regular season ====
Year	Team	GP	MPG	FG%	FT%	RPG	APG	PPG
1963–64	Baltimore	12	7.4	.216	.563	1.6	1.0	2.1
