= Pierre Russell =

American basketball player

Personal information
- Born: December 13, 1949 Kansas City, Kansas, U.S.
- Died: June 12, 1995 (aged 45) Kansas City, Kansas, U.S.
- Listed height: 6 ft 4 in (1.93 m)
- Listed weight: 190 lb (86 kg)

Career information
- High school: Wyandotte (Kansas City, Kansas)
- College: Kansas (1968–1971)
- NBA draft: 1971: 13th round, 207th overall pick
- Drafted by: Milwaukee Bucks
- Playing career: 1971–1972
- Position: Shooting guard
- Number: 15

Career history
- 1971–1972: Kentucky Colonels

Career highlights
- Third-team Parade All-American (1967)
- Stats at Basketball Reference

Pierre Russell (December 13, 1949 – June 12, 1995) was an American basketball player.

== Biography ==
Russell was born Pierre Angelo Russell on December 13, 1949, in Kansas City, Kansas. He attended Wyandotte High School.

== Career ==
Russell played two seasons for the Kentucky Colonels of the American Basketball Association. Previously, he had been drafted by the Milwaukee Bucks in the thirteenth round of the 1971 NBA draft. He played at the collegiate level at the University of Kansas.
