= Kansas's 4th Senate district =

American legislative district

Kansas's 4th State Senate district
Senator
David Haley; D–Kansas City
- Demographics: 26% White; 35% Black; 29% Hispanic; 5% Asian; 4% Other
- Population (2018): 74,219

Kansas's 4th Senate district is one of 40 districts in the Kansas Senate. It has been represented by Democrat David Haley since 2001. It is the most Democratic-leaning Senate district in the state.

== Geography ==
District 4 is based in Kansas City, covering the northern neighborhoods of the city in Wyandotte County.

The district is located entirely within Kansas's 3rd congressional district, and overlaps with the 32nd, 33rd, 34th, 35th, 36th, and 37th districts of the Kansas House of Representatives. It borders the state of Missouri, located across the Missouri River from part of that state's Kansas City.

== Recent election results ==
=== 2020 ===
2020 Kansas Senate election, District 4
Party	Candidate	Votes	%
Democratic	David Haley (incumbent)	17,319	78.6
Republican	Sam Stillwell	4,715	21.4
Total votes		22,034	100
Democratic hold			

=== 2016 ===
2016 Kansas Senate election, District 4
Party	Candidate	Votes	%
Democratic	David Haley (incumbent)	17,090	100
Total votes		17,090	100
Democratic hold			

=== 2012 ===
2012 Kansas Senate election, District 4
Party	Candidate	Votes	%
Democratic	David Haley (incumbent)	17,428	79.9
Republican	Joe Ward	4,394	20.1
Total votes		21,822	100
Democratic hold			

=== Federal and statewide results ===
Year	Office	Results
2020	President	Biden 76.5 – 22%
2018	Governor	Kelly 76.8 – 15.8%
2016	President	Clinton 75.7 – 20.2%
2012	President	Obama 80.7 – 18.0%
