= National Register of Historic Places listings in Wyandotte County, Kansas =

MD. Badrul Ahashan Konok 01577115906 01816523846

Location of Wyandotte County in Kansas

This is a list of the National Register of Historic Places listings in Wyandotte County, Kansas. It is intended to be a complete list of the properties and districts on the National Register of Historic Places in Wyandotte County, Kansas, United States. The locations of National Register properties and districts for which the latitude and longitude coordinates are included below, may be seen in an online map.

There are 48 properties and districts listed on the National Register in the county, including 1 National Historic Landmark. Another 2 properties were once listed but have been removed.

This National Park Service list is complete through NPS recent listings posted June 6, 2026.

== Current listings ==
| | Name on the Register | Image | Date listed | Location | City or town | Description |
|---|---|---|---|---|---|---|
| 1 | Argentine Carnegie Library | Argentine Carnegie Library | April 30, 1986 (#86000919) | 1400 Joseph J. Segura Ln; 39°04′27″N 94°39′40″W | Kansas City | |
| 2 | Bonner Springs High School | Bonner Springs High School | July 11, 2002 (#02000761) | 200 E. 3rd 39°03′28″N 94°52′57″W | Bonner Springs | |
| 3 | Brotherhood Block | Brotherhood Block | July 12, 2019 (#100004198) | 753 State Ave., & 754-756 Minnesota Ave. 39°06′59″N 94°37′45″W | Kansas City | |
| 4 | Brown-Blachly House | Brown-Blachly House | December 23, 2025 (#100012457) | 3464 North 26th Street; 39°09′00″N 94°39′29″W | Kansas City | |
| 5 | Castle Rock | Castle Rock | February 18, 2000 (#00000109) | 852 Washington Boulevard; 39°07′08″N 94°37′56″W | Kansas City | |
| 6 | Fairfax Hills Historic District | Fairfax Hills Historic District | June 30, 2007 (#07000608) | Bounded by Esplanade Ave., Brown Ave., and 12th St., including both sides of Parkwood Boulevard, Coronado Rd. and Hilltop Rd. 39°08′37″N 94°38′17″W | Kansas City | |
| 7 | Fire Station No. 9 | Fire Station No. 9 | September 5, 1985 (#85001982) | 2 S. 14th St. 39°06′14″N 94°38′42″W | Kansas City | |
| 8 | First African Methodist Episcopal Church | | November 27, 2024 (#100011120) | 1111 N. 8th Street; 39°07′02″N 94°37′46″W | Kansas City | |
| 9 | Franklin Elementary School | Franklin Elementary School | June 26, 2013 (#13000437) | 1403 Metropolitan Ave. 39°04′21″N 94°38′43″W | Kansas City | |
| 10 | Judge Louis Gates House | Judge Louis Gates House | December 1, 1980 (#80001477) | 4146 Cambridge St. 39°03′08″N 94°36′31″W | Kansas City | |
| 11 | Granada Theater | Granada Theater | February 9, 2005 (#05000004) | 1013-1019 Minnesota Ave. 39°06′55″N 94°38′10″W | Kansas City | |
| 12 | Grinter Place | Grinter Place | January 25, 1971 (#71000338) | 1420 S. 78th St. 39°04′30″N 94°45′37″W | Kansas City | |
| 13 | H.W. Gates Funeral Home | H.W. Gates Funeral Home | July 6, 2010 (#10000430) | 1901 Olathe Blvd. 39°03′15″N 94°36′27″W | Kansas City | |
| 14 | Hanover Heights Neighborhood Historic District | Hanover Heights Neighborhood Historic District | May 17, 1990 (#90000776) | Roughly bounded by Olathe Boulevard, Frances St., 43rd Ave., and State Line Rd. 39°03′09″N 94°36′38″W | Kansas City | |
| 15 | Huron Cemetery | Huron Cemetery | September 3, 1971 (#71000335) | On Minnesota Ave. between 6th and 7th Sts. 39°06′53″N 94°37′34″W | Kansas City | |
| 16 | Immanuel Baptist Church | | November 17, 2025 (#100009419) | 1335 Quindaro Blvd. 39°08′14″N 94°38′41″W | Kansas City | |
| 17 | Kansas City, Kansas City Hall and Fire Headquarters | Kansas City, Kansas City Hall and Fire Headquarters | April 25, 1986 (#86000857) | 805 and 815 N. 6th St. 39°06′51″N 94°37′24″W | Kansas City | Boundary increase approved January 6, 2022 |
| 18 | Kansas City, Kansas High School Gymnasium and Laboratory | Kansas City, Kansas High School Gymnasium and Laboratory | January 20, 2012 (#11001038) | 1017 N. 9th St. 39°06′59″N 94°37′55″W | Kansas City | |
| 19 | Kansas City, Kansas YMCA Building | Kansas City, Kansas YMCA Building | July 12, 2019 (#100004199) | 900 N. 8th St. 39°06′53″N 94°37′47″W | Kansas City | |
| 20 | Lake of the Forest Historic District | | January 22, 1996 (#95001553) | K-32; 39°03′57″N 94°50′24″W | Bonner Springs | |
| 21 | Lowell Elementary School | Lowell Elementary School | January 31, 2008 (#07001485) | 1040 Orville Ave. 39°06′36″N 94°38′14″W | Kansas City | |
| 22 | Horace Mann Elementary School | Horace Mann Elementary School | January 20, 2012 (#11001037) | 824 State Ave. 39°07′01″N 94°37′51″W | Kansas City | |
| 23 | Cordell D. Meeks Sr. House | Cordell D. Meeks Sr. House | October 9, 2013 (#13000819) | 600 Oakland Ave. 39°07′15″N 94°37′29″W | Kansas City | |
| 24 | Northeast Junior High School | Northeast Junior High School | October 16, 2008 (#08000988) | 400 Troup Ave. 39°07′39″N 94°37′05″W | Kansas City | |
| 25 | Quindaro Townsite | Quindaro Townsite | May 22, 2002 (#02000547) | Parallel Parkway and N. 38th St. 39°07′46″N 94°40′22″W | Kansas City | |
| 26 | Rosedale World War I Memorial Arch | Rosedale World War I Memorial Arch | August 2, 1977 (#77000599) | Mt. Marty Park near Booth and Drexel Sts. 39°03′50″N 94°36′54″W | Kansas City | |
| 27 | St. Augustine Hall | St. Augustine Hall | February 24, 1971 (#71000336) | 3301 Parallel Ave. 39°07′39″N 94°40′08″W | Kansas City | |
| 28 | Saint Margaret's Hospital | Saint Margaret's Hospital | January 2, 2013 (#12001123) | 263 S. 8th St., 759 Vermont Ave. 39°05′50″N 94°37′45″W | Kansas City | |
| 29 | Sauer Castle | Sauer Castle | August 2, 1977 (#77000600) | 945 Shawnee Dr. 39°04′07″N 94°38′00″W | Kansas City | |
| 30 | Schleifer-McAlpine House | Schleifer-McAlpine House | October 10, 2007 (#07001072) | 608 Splitlog Ave. 39°06′33″N 94°37′28″W | Kansas City | |
| 31 | Frank and Agnes Schmotz Farmstead | | June 17, 2024 (#100010423) | 643 South 138th Street; 39°05′07″N 94°54′02″W | Bonner Springs | |
| 32 | Scottish Rite Temple | Scottish Rite Temple | September 11, 1985 (#85002127) | 803 N. 7th St. 39°06′50″N 94°37′34″W | Kansas City | |
| 33 | Theodore Shafer House | Theodore Shafer House | February 18, 2000 (#00000108) | 2518 N. 10th St. 39°08′04″N 94°38′07″W | Kansas City | |
| 34 | Shawnee Street Overpass | Shawnee Street Overpass | March 8, 1984 (#84001245) | Northwest of U.S. Route 35; 39°04′19″N 94°37′15″W | Kansas City | Location was at Shawnee Road and 7th Street Traffic-way; Original structure was replaced during the 2000s with a newer structure. |
| 35 | Simmons Funeral Home | Simmons Funeral Home | January 8, 2014 (#13001046) | 1404 S. 37th St. 39°04′29″N 94°40′18″W | Kansas City | |
| 36 | Soldiers and Sailors Memorial Building | Soldiers and Sailors Memorial Building | September 5, 1985 (#85001981) | 600 N. 7th St. 39°06′44″N 94°37′38″W | Kansas City | |
| 37 | Sumner High School and Athletic Field | Sumner High School and Athletic Field | September 6, 2005 (#05000974) | 1610 N. 8th St. 39°07′15″N 94°37′49″W | Kansas City | |
| 38 | Town House Hotel | Town House Hotel | June 27, 2014 (#14000352) | 1011 N. 7th St. Trafficway; 39°06′59″N 94°37′35″W | Kansas City | Now Cross Lines Tower. |
| 39 | Trowbridge Archeological Site | | February 24, 1971 (#71000337) | Between 61st and 63rd Sts., north of May Ln. and Leavenworth Rd. 39°08′40″N 94°43′20″W | Kansas City | |
| 40 | Vernon School | | October 10, 2023 (#100009420) | 3436 North 27th St. or 2700 Sewell Ave. 39°08′55″N 94°39′33″W | Kansas City | |
| 41 | Welborn Community Congregational Church | Welborn Community Congregational Church | April 16, 2013 (#13000166) | 5217 Leavenworth Rd; 39°08′33″N 94°42′03″W | Kansas City | |
| 42 | Westheight Apartments Historic District | Westheight Apartments Historic District | July 7, 2015 (#15000388) | 1601-1637 Washington Blvd. 39°07′12″N 94°38′52″W | Kansas City | |
| 43 | Westheight Manor District | Westheight Manor District | March 26, 1975 (#75000729) | Bounded roughly by 18th and 24th Sts. and Oakland and State Aves.; also roughly bounded by State and Wood Aves. and 18th and 25th Sts. 39°07′07″N 94°39′09″W | Kansas City | Second set of addresses represents a boundary increase |
| 44 | Whitefeather Spring | Whitefeather Spring | August 27, 1975 (#75000728) | 3818 Ruby Ave. 39°04′18″N 94°40′25″W | Kansas City | |
| 45 | Whittier School | Whittier School | January 4, 2023 (#100008520) | 290 South 10th St. 39°05′47″N 94°38′08″W | Kansas City | |
| 46 | Roy Williamson House | Roy Williamson House | April 18, 2007 (#07000311) | 1865 Edwardsville Dr. 39°03′59″N 94°49′18″W | Edwardsville | |
| 47 | Wyandotte County Courthouse | Wyandotte County Courthouse | April 26, 2002 (#02000398) | 710 N. 7th St. 39°06′51″N 94°37′38″W | Kansas City | |
| 48 | Wyandotte High School | Wyandotte High School | April 30, 1986 (#86000920) | 2500 Minnesota Ave. 39°06′52″N 94°39′21″W | Kansas City | |

== Former listings ==
| | Name on the Register | Image | Date listed | Date removed | Location | City or town | Description |
|---|---|---|---|---|---|---|---|
| 1 | Huron Building | | July 5, 1984 (#84001243) | June 14, 2000 | 905 N. 7th St. | Kansas City | Demolished by implosion in 2000. |
| 2 | St. John the Divine Catholic Church | St. John the Divine Catholic Church | October 9, 2013 (#13000820) | October 5, 2020 | 2511 Metropolitan Ave. 39°04′23″N 94°39′31″W | Kansas City | |

== See also ==
- List of National Historic Landmarks in Kansas
- National Register of Historic Places listings in Kansas
