= Gates House =

Gates House may refer to:

- J. M. Gates House, Kingman Arizona, NRHP-listed
- Neil H. Gates House, Phoenix, Arizona, NRHP-listed
- Gates House (Denver, Colorado), a Denver Landmark
- Judge Louis Gates House, Kansas City, Kansas, NRHP-listed
- Gates House (Machiasport, Maine), listed on the National Register of Historic Places
- Gates House (Albion, Nebraska), designed by William Lang (architect)
- Gates Homestead, Bolton, New York, NRHP-listed
- Bill and Melinda Gates' House, Medina, Washington, a big house
- Gates-Helm Farm, NRHP-listed
- Gates-Livermore Cobblestone Farmhouse, NRHP-listed
- Gates–Daves House, NRHP-listed
- Benjamin Franklin Gates House, Albion, New York, NRHP-listed
- Cyrus Gates Farmstead, Maine, New York, NRHP-listed
- Gen. Horatio Gates House and Golden Plough Tavern, York, Pennsylvania, NRHP-listed
- Holsey Gates House, Bedford, Ohio, NRHP-listed
- C. E. "Pop" Gates House, Medford, Oregon

- Russell and Elinor Gates Mansion, Denver, Colorado, NRHP-listed
- Seth M. Gates House, Warsaw, New York, NRHP-listed
- Gates-Helm Farm, Snowball, Arkansas, NRHP-listed
- Gates-Livermore Cobblestone, Mendon, New York, NRHP-listed
- Gates-Daves House, Mobile Alabama, NRHP-listed
- Groat-Gates House, Portland, Oregon, NRHP-listed
- H.W. Gates Funeral Home, Kansas City, Kansas, NRHP-listed
- Rice-Gates House, Hillsboro, Oregon, NRHP-listed
