= Kansas City, Kansas High School Gymnasium and Laboratory =

- U.S. National Register of Historic Places
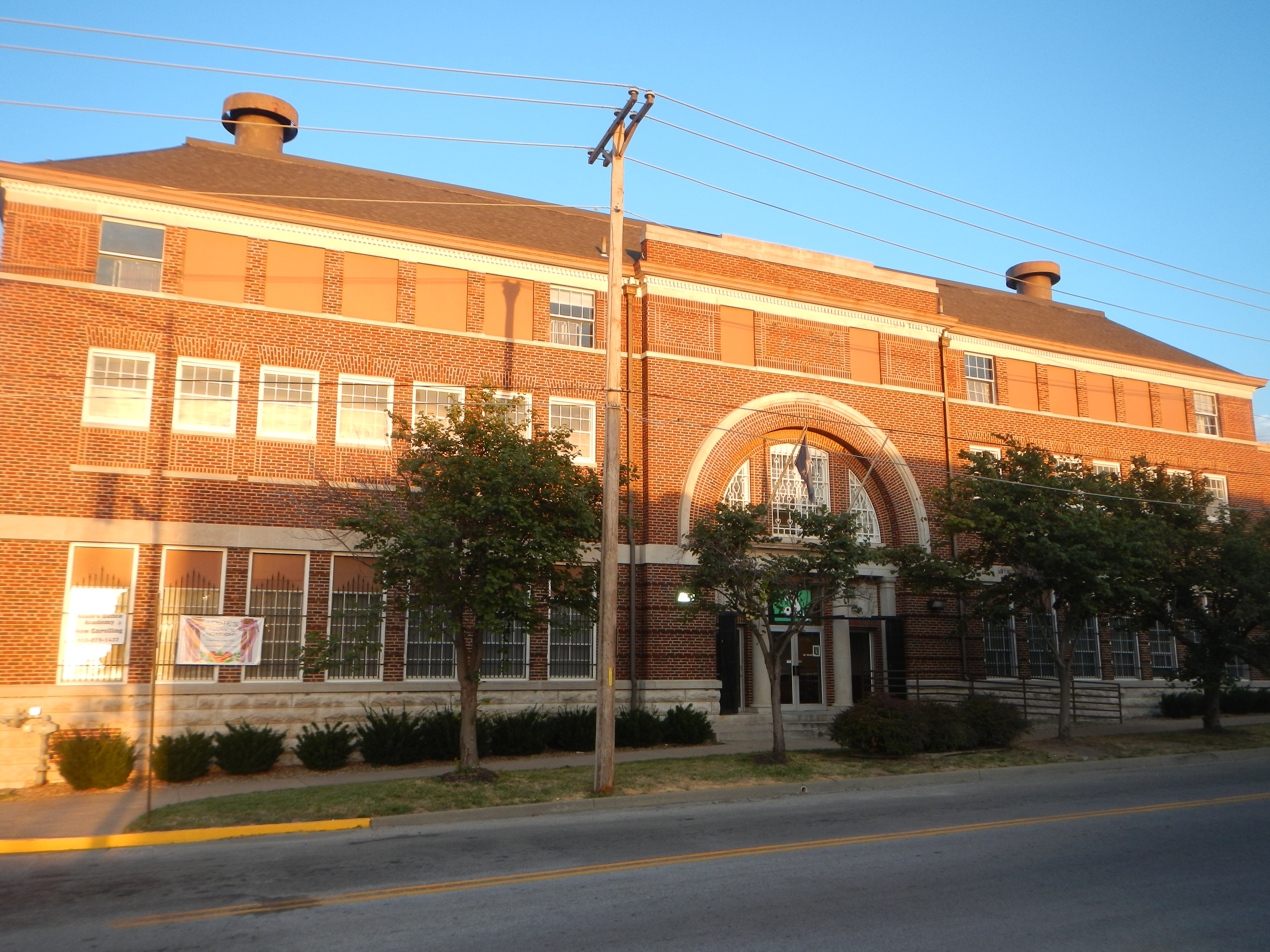
- The building in 2013

- Location within Kansas
- Location: 1017 N. 9th St., Kansas City, Kansas
- Coordinates: 39°06′59″N 94°37′55″W
- Area: Less than one acre
- Built: 1923
- Architects: Rose, William Warren; Peterson, David B.
- Architectural style: Late 19th And 20th Century Revivals, Renaissance Revival
- MPS: Public Schools of Kansas MPS
- NRHP reference No.: 11001038
- Added to NRHP: January 20, 2012

The Kansas City, Kansas High School Gymnasium and Laboratory, at 1017 N. 9th St. in Kansas City, Kansas, was built in 1923. It was listed on the National Register of Historic Places in 2012.

The building originally served as part of the Kansas City High School, housing a gymnasium, swimming pool, locker rooms, and laboratories for physics, chemistry, and home economics; later some facilities had to be rebuilt after a fire in 1934.

It was designed by architects William Warren Rose and David B. Peterson of Rose & Peterson. It has elements of Renaissance Revival style.
