= Cross Lines Tower =

Building in Kansas City, Kansas, U.S.

Coordinates: 39.11648°N 94.626322°W

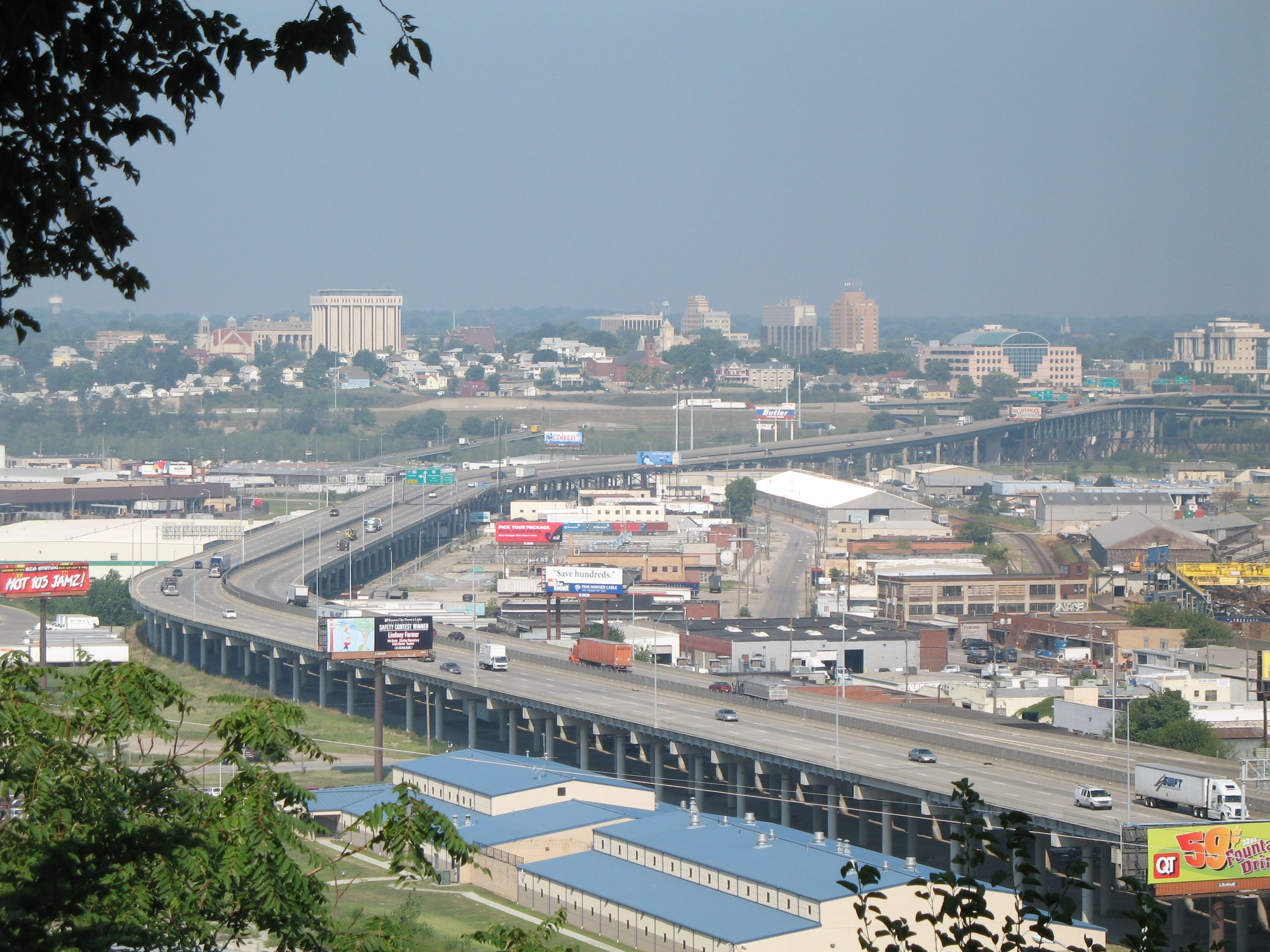
The Tower is the tallest building on the right. The tallest building on the left is the Kansas City, Kansas City Hall.

Cross Lines Tower is a 15-story 175-foot-high building that from 1951 to 1969 was the tallest building in Kansas City, Kansas. It is currently the tallest building in downtown and is the city's third tallest building – only a foot shorter than the other two.

In its glory days in the 1950s and 1960s as a 257-room hotel at 1021 North 7th Street it was frequently used by visiting Major League Baseball teams and American Football League teams and was where singer Patsy Cline spent her last night before being killed in a plane crash while flying back to Nashville from Fairfax Airport.

It is currently a retirement home.

The site is the former Wyandotte County, Kansas, jail that was built in 1880 and used until 1931. The jail site remained abandoned even though hotel plans were made in 1937. The jail was razed in November 1949 in preparation for the new Town House Hotel designed by Eugene J. Stern, which opened August 6, 1951.

It was later renamed Town House Motor Hotel.

On March 3, 1963, Patsy Cline and her entourage stayed at the hotel during a benefit concert at Memorial Hall for former KCKN/KCMK disc jockey Cactus Jack Call who had died in a January car accident.

On March 4, Cline was unable to fly out of Fairfax Airport because it was fogged in. She turned down an offer to take an eight-hour drive back to Nashville.

She checked out of the hotel at 12:30 p.m. on March 5, the day of her fatal flight.

In 1969, Wyandotte Towers, which is also 15 stories but one foot higher, opened. In 1972, Rainbow Towers (now called Vista Condominiums) opened. It is also 15 stories and one foot higher. All of the structures in Kansas City, Kansas are not taller than any of the 40 tallest buildings in neighboring Kansas City, Missouri.

The Town House closed on June 22, 1970, because of mortgage foreclosure, interest payments and outstanding back taxes.

In March 1971, it opened as the Ramada Inn – Center City. On March 29, 1979, it was sold to become a retirement center with grants from Housing and Urban Development.

In April 2021, a $42-(m) ronovation was completed on the former Cross Lines Tower. In a formal rededication ceremony, Kansas City, Kansas civic leaders and the Cross Lines Housing Authority rebranded Cross Lines Tower as the "Town House Apartments". The red neon sign that once burn bright atop the tower was reestablished to officially mark the beginning of a new era to be known as Town House Apartments.
