= Hanover Heights Neighborhood Historic District =

Historic district in Kansas, United States

- U.S. National Register of Historic Places
- U.S. Historic district
- Boulevard Apartments, part of the historic district

- Location within Kansas Location within the United States
- Location: Roughly bounded by Olathe Blvd., Frances St., 43rd Ave., and State Line Rd., Kansas City, Kansas
- Coordinates: 39°3′9″N 94°36′38″W
- Area: 15.5 acres (6.3 ha)
- Built: 1921
- Architects: Faulkner, W.P.; Shepard, Charles
- Architectural style: Prairie School, Bungalow/Craftsman, Homestead;Foursquare
- NRHP reference No.: 90000776
- Added to NRHP: May 17, 1990

The Hanover Heights Historic District area was developed between 1912 and 1930. It is a 15.5 acres (6.3 ha) district containing 90 contributing buildings located between State Line Road and Rainbow Boulevard to Olathe Boulevard and West 43rd Avenue in Kansas City, Kansas. It was placed on Register of Historic Kansas Places on December 2, 1989. It was placed on National Register of Historic Places on May 17, 1990.

In September 2012, it became the center point for The Kansas City Startup Village (KCSV), an entrepreneur-led, organic, grassroots initiative helping to solidify Kansas City as a premiere startup city in America. The KCSV operates under the Twitter username @KCSV and hashtag #KCSV. Google Fiber Ignites Kansas City Startup Scene

The district includes the Judge Louis R. Gates Residence (c. 1922–1923), a Prairie style residence at 4146 Cambridge Street, designed by Clarence Shepard, which was separately listed on the National Register in 1980.
