= Box Butte County Courthouse =

- U.S. National Register of Historic Places
- U.S. Historic district
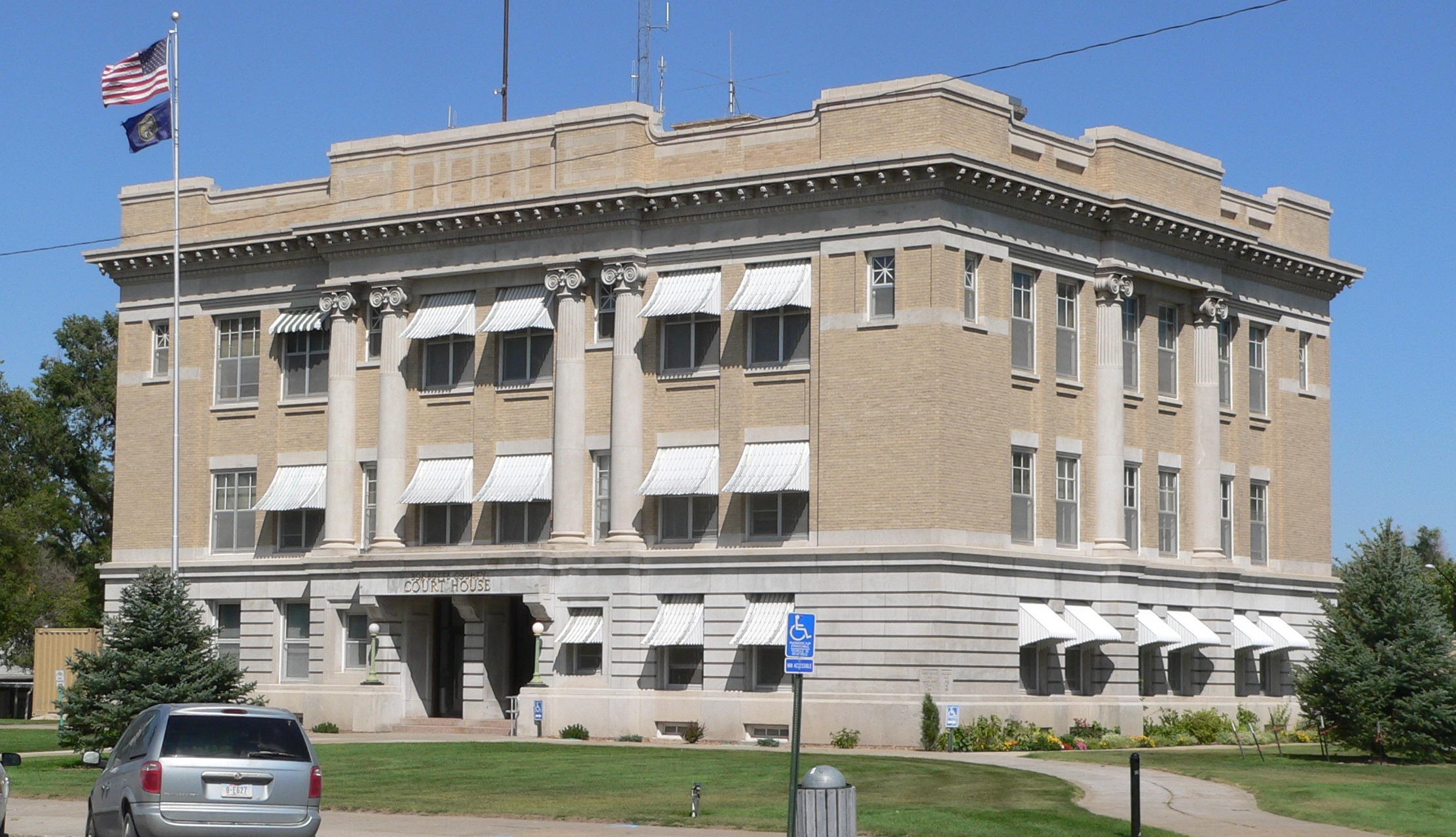
- Photo in 2010

- Location within Nebraska Location within the United States
- Location: Box Butte Ave. between E. 5th and 6th Sts., Alliance, Nebraska
- Coordinates: 42°5′59″N 102°52′12″W
- Area: 2 acres (0.81 ha)
- Built: 1913
- Architect: Rose & Peterson
- Architectural style: Beaux Arts
- MPS: County Courthouses of Nebraska MPS
- NRHP reference No.: 89002212
- Added to NRHP: January 10, 1990

The Box Butte County Courthouse, which is located on Box Butte Ave. between E. 5th and 6th Sts. in Alliance, Nebraska, is a historic building that was built in 1913. It was designed by Rose & Peterson in Beaux Arts architectural style.

It was listed on the National Register of Historic Places in 1990.
