= Kansas City, Kansas City Hall and Fire Headquarters =

- U.S. National Register of Historic Places
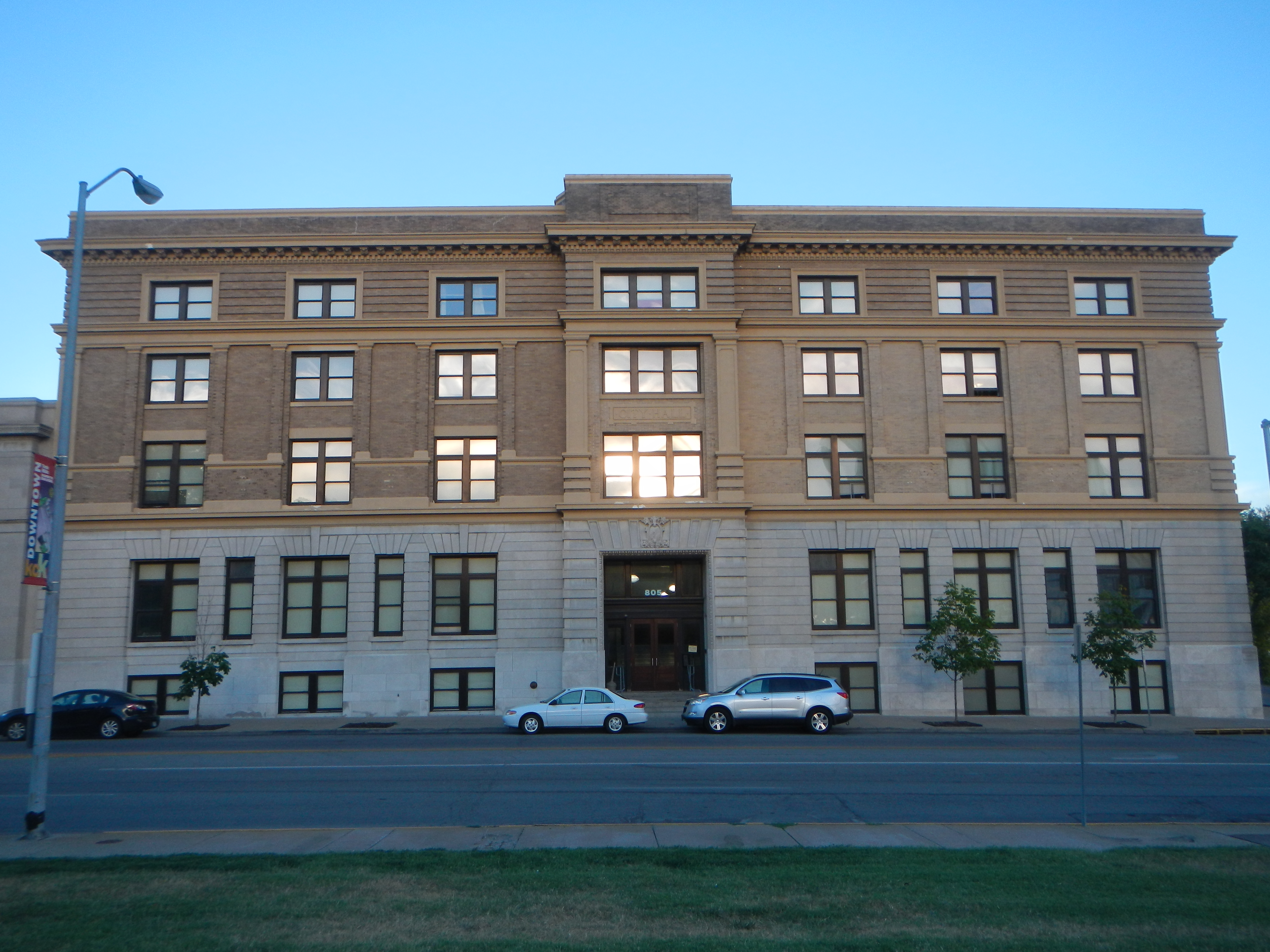

- Location within Kansas Location within the United States
- Location: 805 and 815 N. Sixth St., Kansas City, Kansas
- Coordinates: 39°06′59″N 94°37′55″W
- Area: 0.8 acres (0.32 ha)
- Built: 1910-11, 1929-30
- Architect: Rose, William W.; Peterson, David B.; Keyser, Charles E.
- Architectural style: Renaissance Revival
- NRHP reference No.: 86000857 (original); 100007283 (increase)

Significant dates
- Added to NRHP: April 25, 1986
- Boundary increase: January 6, 2022

The Kansas City, Kansas City Hall and Fire Headquarters is a pair of buildings at 805 and 815 N. Sixth St. in Kansas City, Kansas. The buildings are also known as Old City Hall and Main Fire Station. They were listed on the National Register of Historic Places in 1986.

The city hall portion was designed in the Renaissance Revival style by architects William W. Rose and David B. Peterson, of Rose & Peterson, and built in 1910-1911. It is five stories tall, upon a high basement, though only four stories can usually be seen from street level. The fifth floor is a penthouse level holding a jail.

The Fire Headquarters portion was designed by Charles E. Keyser, also in the Renaissance Revival style, and built as an annex to the city hall in 1929-1930. It is two stories tall, also with a high basement. The basement included offices which housed the Kansas Film Censor Board for many years.
