= Burt County Courthouse =

- U.S. National Register of Historic Places
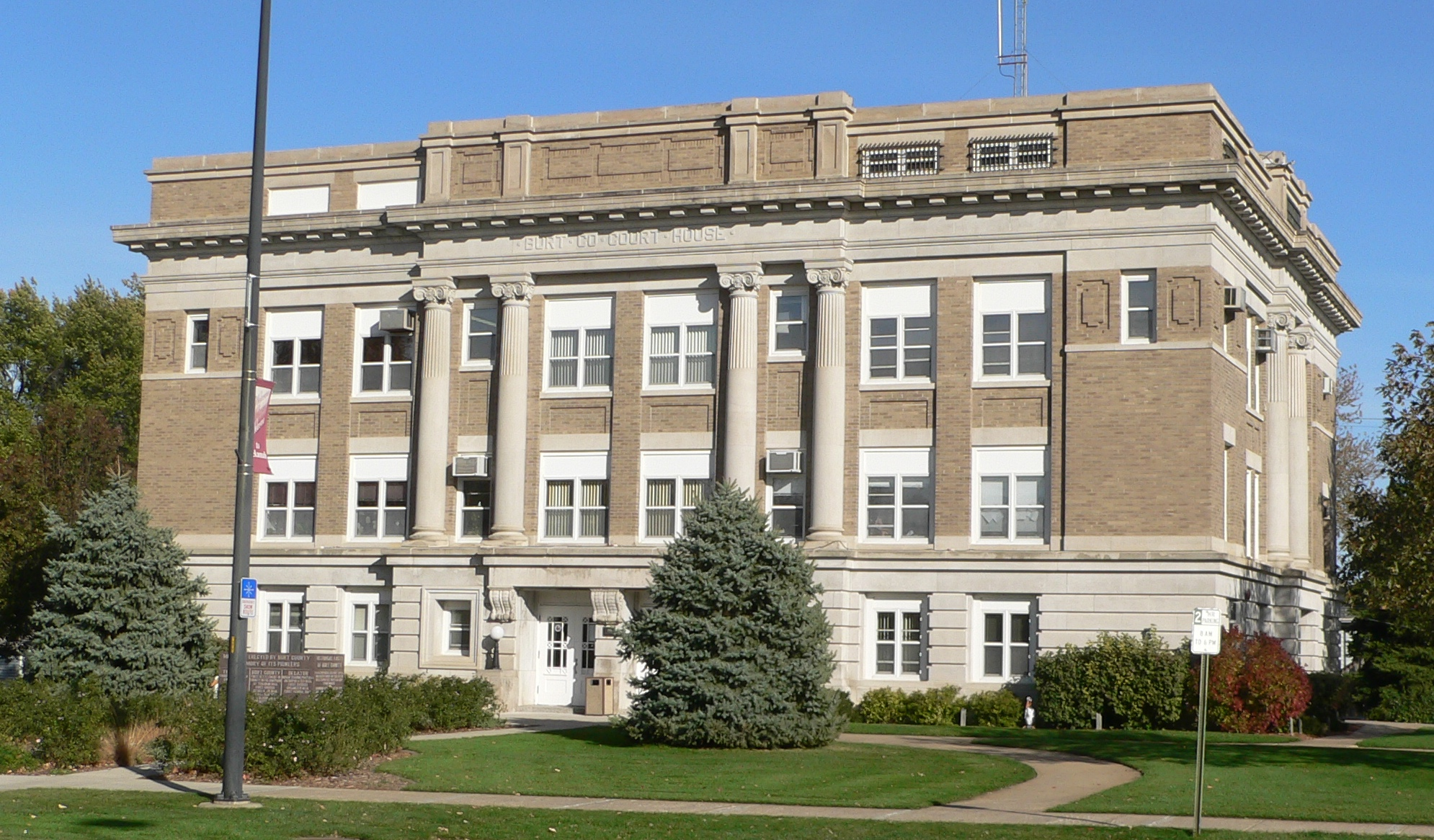
- The courthouse in 2010

- Location within Nebraska Location within the United States
- Location: 13th Street between M and N Streets, Tekamah, Nebraska
- Coordinates: 41°46′43″N 96°13′13″W
- Area: 1 acre (0.40 ha)
- Built: 1916
- Architect: Rose & Peterson
- Architectural style: Beaux Arts
- MPS: County Courthouses of Nebraska MPS
- NRHP reference No.: 89002223
- Added to NRHP: January 10, 1990

The Burt County Courthouse is a historic building in Tekamah, Nebraska, and the courthouse for Burt County, Nebraska. It was built in 1916-1917 to replace the old 1878 courthouse. It was designed in the Beaux Arts style by Rose & Peterson. It has been listed on the National Register of Historic Places since January 10, 1990.

== Artwork ==
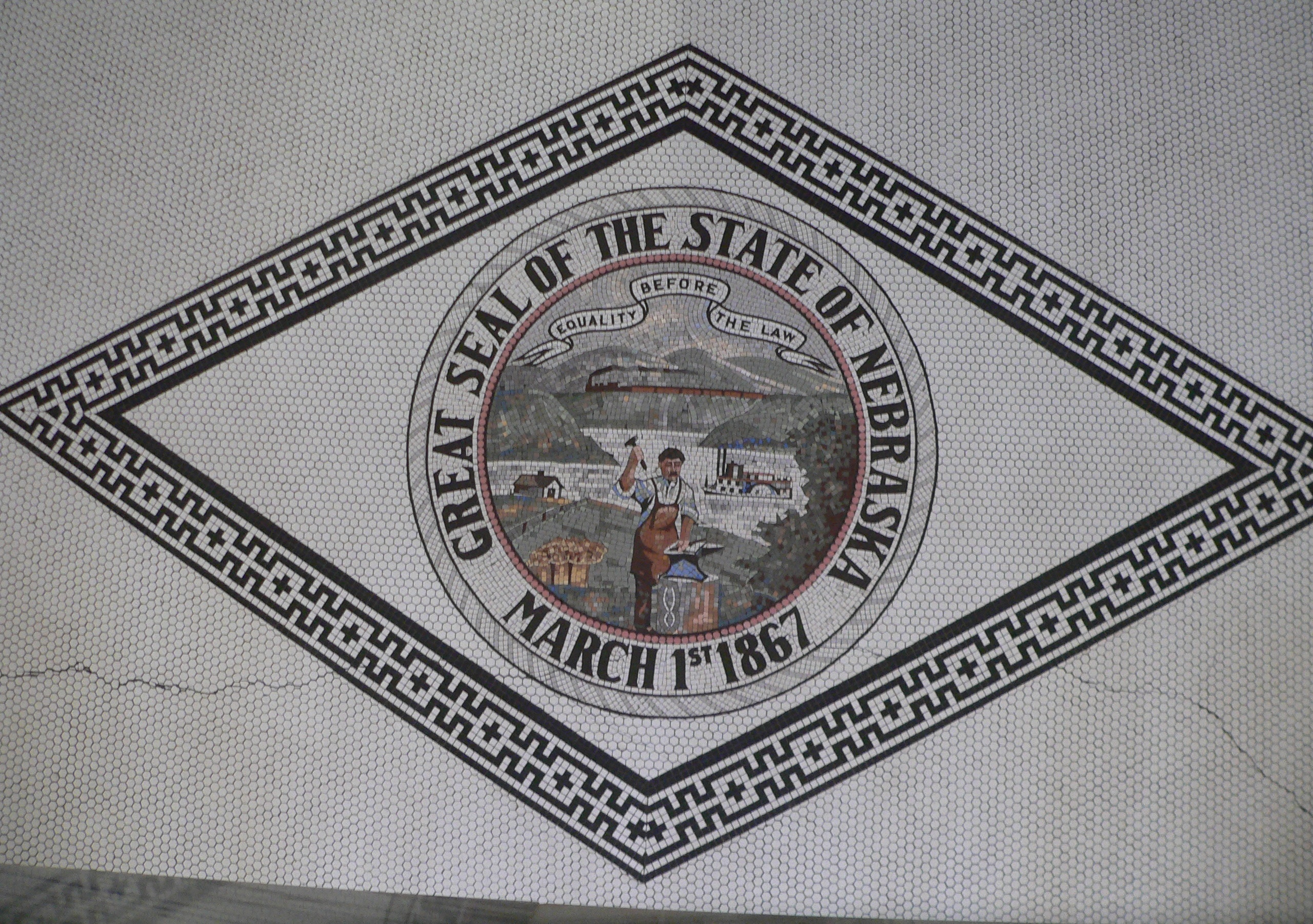
Seal of Nebraska floor mosaic in the courthouse

The courthouse contains a floor mosaic of the Seal of Nebraska dating from the construction of the building. The walls are painted with more recent murals by local artists commemorating military and government service by people in Burt County over its history.
