= Rose & Peterson =

Former architectural firm in Kansas City, Kansas

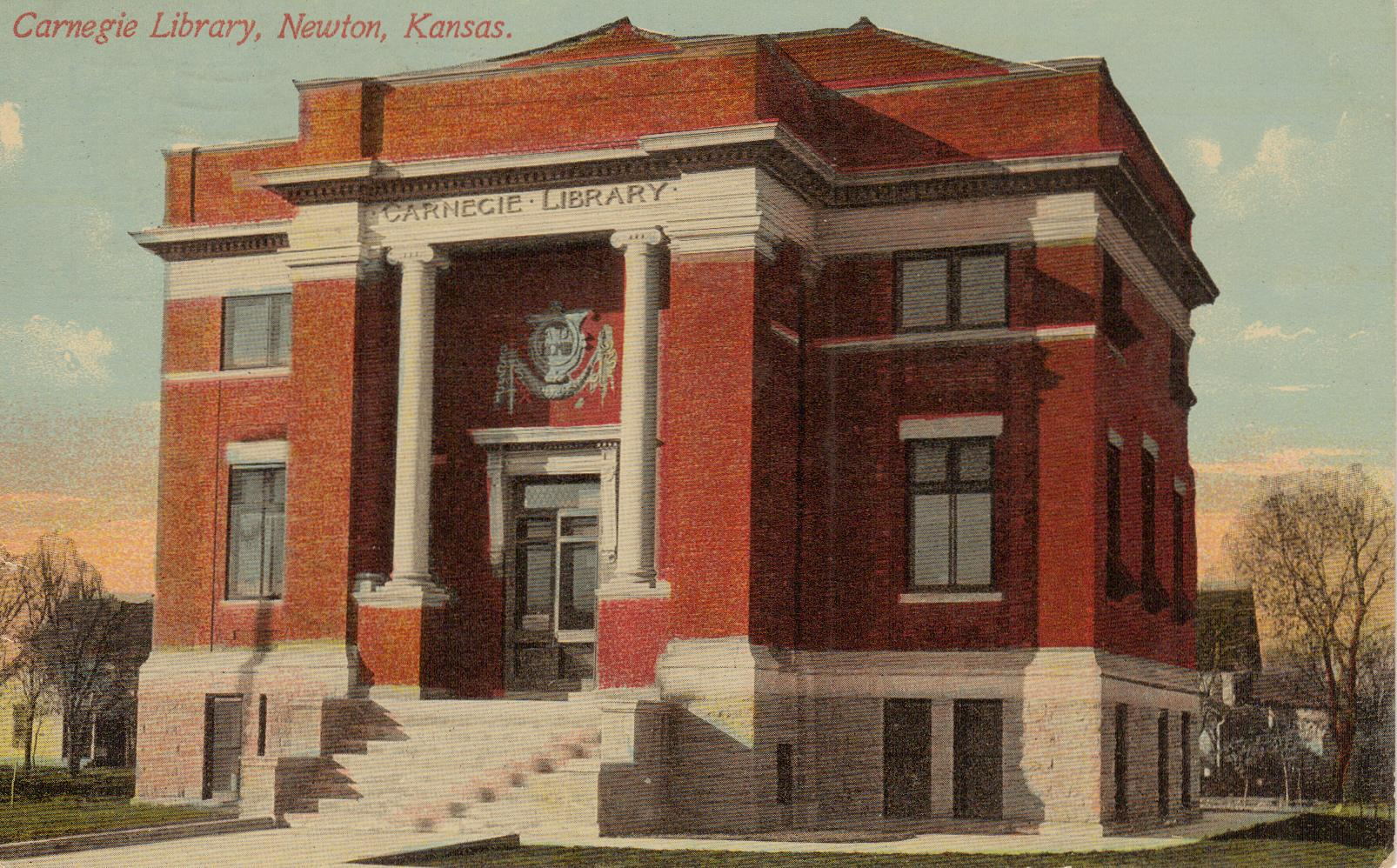
Carnegie Library (Newton, Kansas), before 1913

Rose & Peterson was an architectural firm in Kansas City, Kansas. It was a partnership of William Warren Rose (1864–1931) and David Burton Peterson (1875–1937).

Rose served as mayor of Kansas City during 1905–07, and accomplished the creation of a municipal water system.

A number of their works are listed on the U.S. National Register of Historic Places.

Works include (with attribution):

- Box Butte County Courthouse, Box Butte Ave. between E. 5th and 6th Sts., Alliance, Nebraska (Rose & Peterson), NRHP-listed
- Burt County Courthouse, 13th St. between M and N Sts., Tekamah, Nebraska (Rose & Peterson), NRHP-listed
- Northeast Junior High School, 400 Troup Ave., Kansas City, Kansas (Rose & Peterson), NRHP-listed
- Soldiers and Sailors Memorial Building, 600 N. 7th St., Kansas City, KS (Rose & Peterson), NRHP-listed
- Argentine Carnegie Library, Twenty-eighth St. and Metropolitan Ave., Kansas City, KS (Rose, William W.; Peterson, David B.), NRHP-listed
- Carnegie Library (Newton, Kansas), 203 Main St., Newton, KS (Rose, W. W.), NRHP-listed
- Kansas City, Kansas City Hall and Fire Headquarters, 805 and 815 N. Sixth St., Kansas City, KS (Rose, William W.; Peterson, David B.), NRHP-listed
- Manhattan Carnegie Library Building, Fifth and Poyntz, Manhattan, KS (Rose, William Warren), NRHP-listed
- Scottish Rite Temple (Kansas City, Kansas), 803 N. 7th St., Kansas City, KS (Rose, William W.), NRHP-listed
- Hamlin County Courthouse, 300 4th St., Hayti, SD (Rose, Wm. & Peterson, D.B.), NRHP-listed
- Lowell Elementary School, 1040 Orville Ave., Kansas City, KS (Rose, William W.; Peterson, David B.), NRHP-listed
- Kansas City, Kansas City Hall and Fire Headquarters, 805 and 815 N. Sixth St., Kansas City, KS (Peterson, David B.), NRHP-listed
- One or more works in Newton Main Street Historic District I, 200 through 214 and 203 through 301 N. Main St., Newton, KS (Rose, William), NRHP-listed
