= H.W. Gates Funeral Home =

Historic landmark in Kansas City, Kansas, United States

- U.S. National Register of Historic Places
- The building in 2021

- Location within Kansas Location within the United States
- Location: 1901 Olathe Boulevard; Kansas City, Kansas; United States
- Coordinates: 39°3′16″N 94°36′27″W
- Architect: Fred S. Wilson
- Architectural style: Neoclassical
- NRHP reference No.: 10000430
- Added to NRHP: July 6, 2010

The H.W. Gates Funeral Home is a historical landmark in Kansas City, Kansas, United States, that is listed on the National Register of Historic Places (NRNP).

== Description ==
The building is located at 1901 Olathe Bouelevard and was established in the mid-1890s by Horatio W. and Mary Gates. That Gates family was among the first licensed embalmers in the state, and they built this Neoclassical-style funeral home in 1922 to house their growing business. Designed by Architect Fred S. Wilson in 1922, it served as the Gates family residence as well as their place of business. The 2 1/2-story building was built in the Neoclassical style. The Gates Funeral Home was run by three generations over almost 100 years in the Rosedale neighborhood of Kansas City.

== See also ==
- National Register of Historic Places listings in Wyandotte County, Kansas
