= Manhattan Carnegie Library Building =

- U.S. National Register of Historic Places
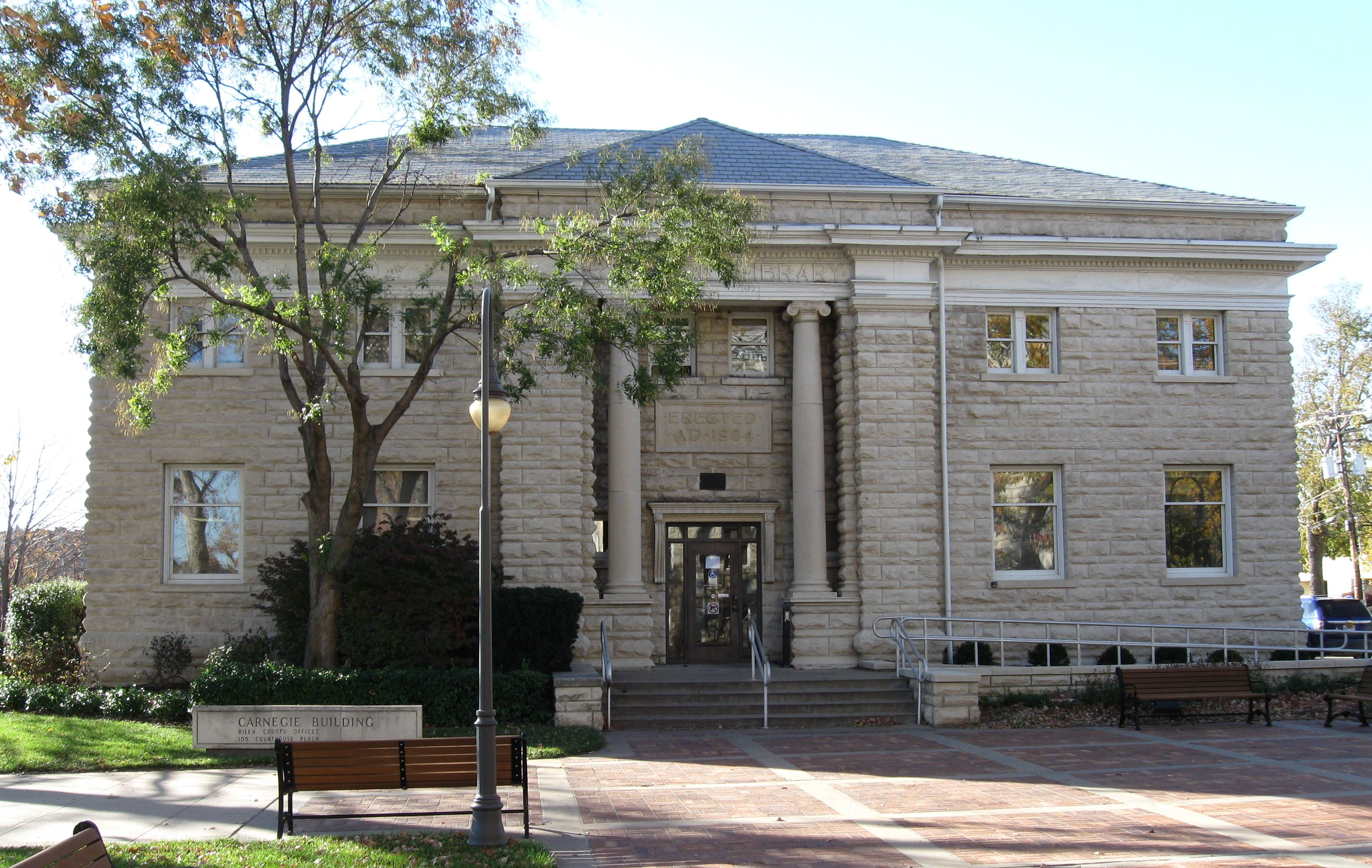

- Location within Kansas Location within the United States
- Location: Fifth and Poyntz, Manhattan, Kansas
- Coordinates: 39°10′43″N 96°33′55″W
- Area: less than one acre
- Built: 1904
- Built by: Scanneman, P.N.
- Architect: Rose, William Warren
- Architectural style: Classical Revival
- MPS: Carnegie Libraries of Kansas TR
- NRHP reference No.: 87000970
- Added to NRHP: June 25, 1987

The Manhattan Carnegie Library Building in Manhattan, Kansas, United States, is a Carnegie Library built in 1904. It was listed on the National Register of Historic Places in 1987.

It is a two-story rusticated limestone block building, about 25 by 50 feet (7.6 m × 15.2 m) in plan, with Classical Revival style. It is now used as the annex for the Riley County Courthouse.
