= Scottish Rite Temple (Kansas City, Kansas) =

- U.S. National Register of Historic Places
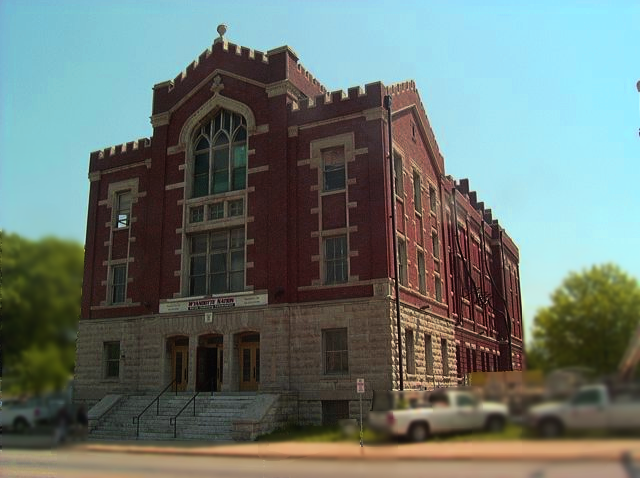
- Scottish Rite Temple

- Location within Kansas Location within the United States
- Location: Kansas City, Kansas
- Coordinates: 39°6′50″N 94°37′34″W
- Built: 1908-1909
- Architect: William W. Rose
- NRHP reference No.: 85002127
- Added to NRHP: September 11, 1985

The Scottish Rite Temple is located at 803 North 7th Street Trafficway in Kansas City, Kansas. It was designed by architect W. W. Rose. Construction began in 1908 and it was completed in 1909. It was listed on the National Register of Historic Places in 1985.

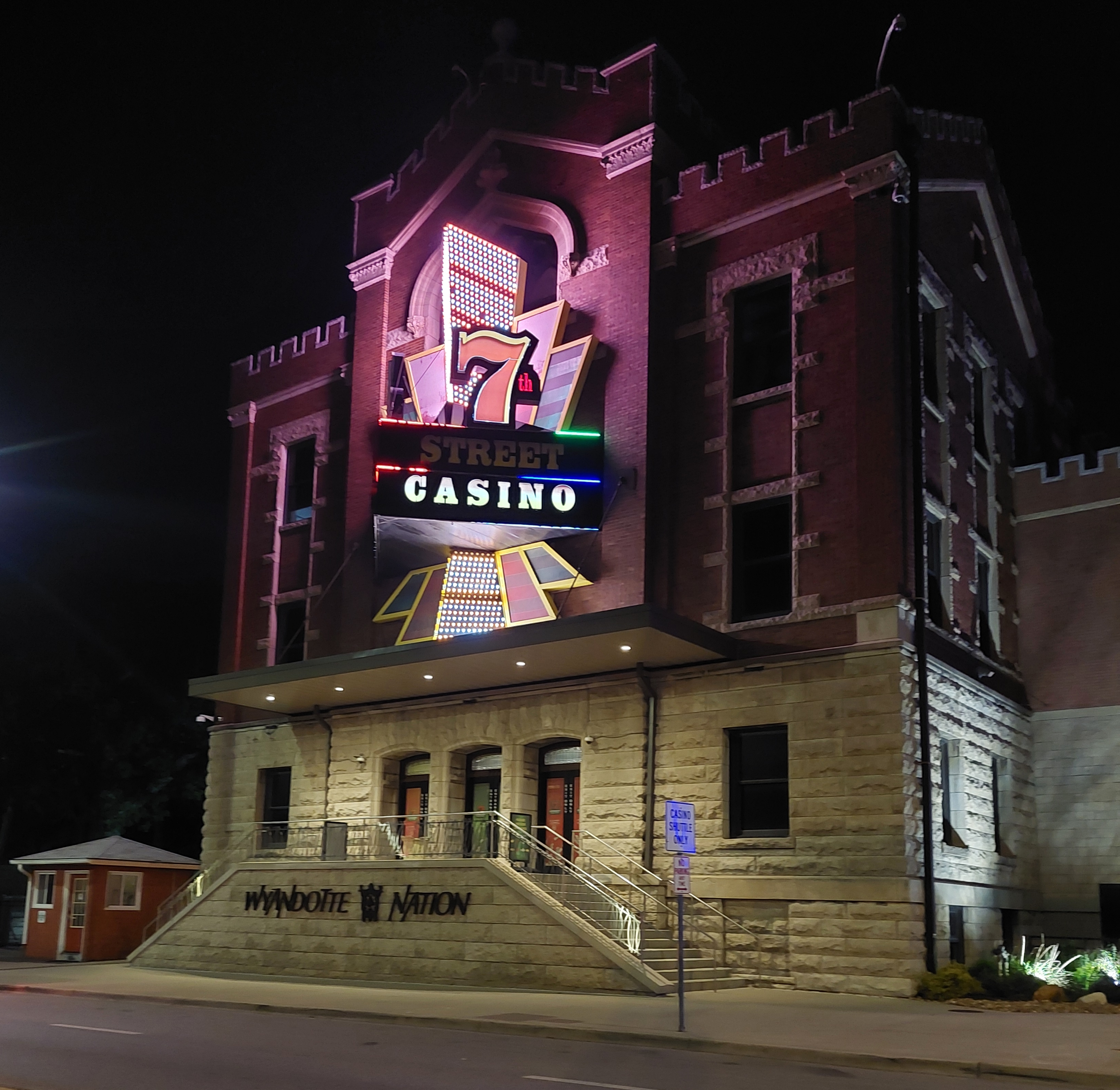
The casino at night

It was placed on the Kansas City, Kansas Historic Landmark on December 1, 1983. It was placed on the Register of Historic Kansas Places on May 4, 1985. The Wyandotte Nation's 7th Street Casino opened in the building on January 10, 2008.

It is a three-story brick and stone building.

It was the largest meeting place in Kansas City until the 1924 construction of the Soldiers and Sailors Memorial Building (also designed by W.W. Rose, also NRHP-listed).

== See also ==
- Kansas City Scottish Rite Temple, built 1928-30
