= Shawnee Street Overpass =

Bridge in Kansas, U.S.

- U.S. National Register of Historic Places
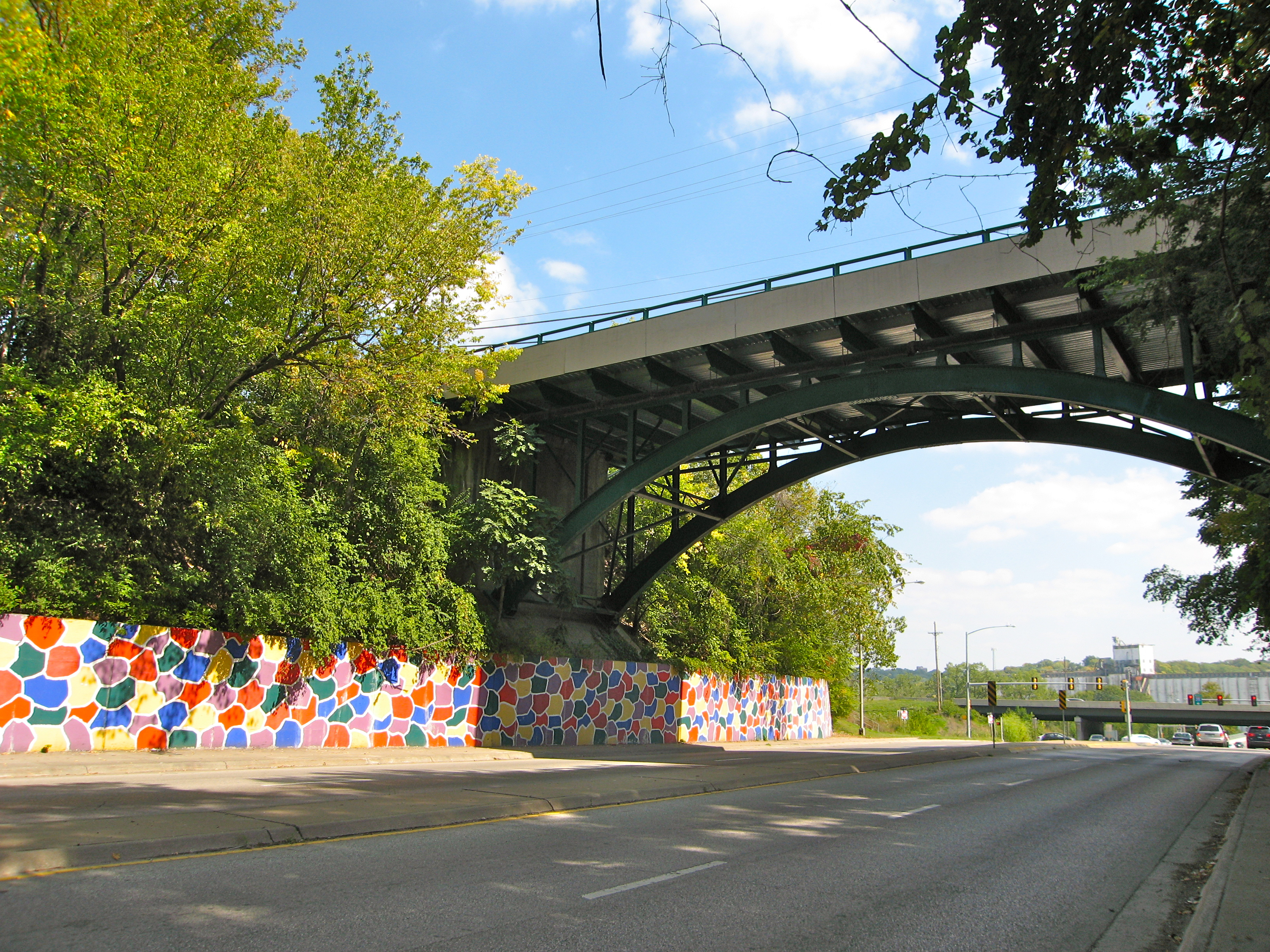

- Location within Kansas
- Location: Kansas City, KS
- Coordinates: 39°4′18.58″N 94°37′14.74″W
- Built: 1932; 94 years ago
- Architect: Kansas City Structural Steel
- NRHP reference No.: 84001245
- Added to NRHP: March 8, 1984

The Shawnee Street Overpass (also known as the Shawnee Road Bridge) is an overpass in Kansas City, Kansas, United States. The bridge allows traffic Shawnee Road to go over South 7th Street, a section of U.S. Route 169. It was completed in 1932; the engineer of the bridge is unknown. It was added to the Register of Historic Kansas Places on August 27, 1983. It was placed on the National Register of Historic Places on March 8, 1984.

The bridge was fully rebuilt in 2005.
