= Gates–Daves House =

Historic house in Alabama, United States

- U.S. National Register of Historic Places
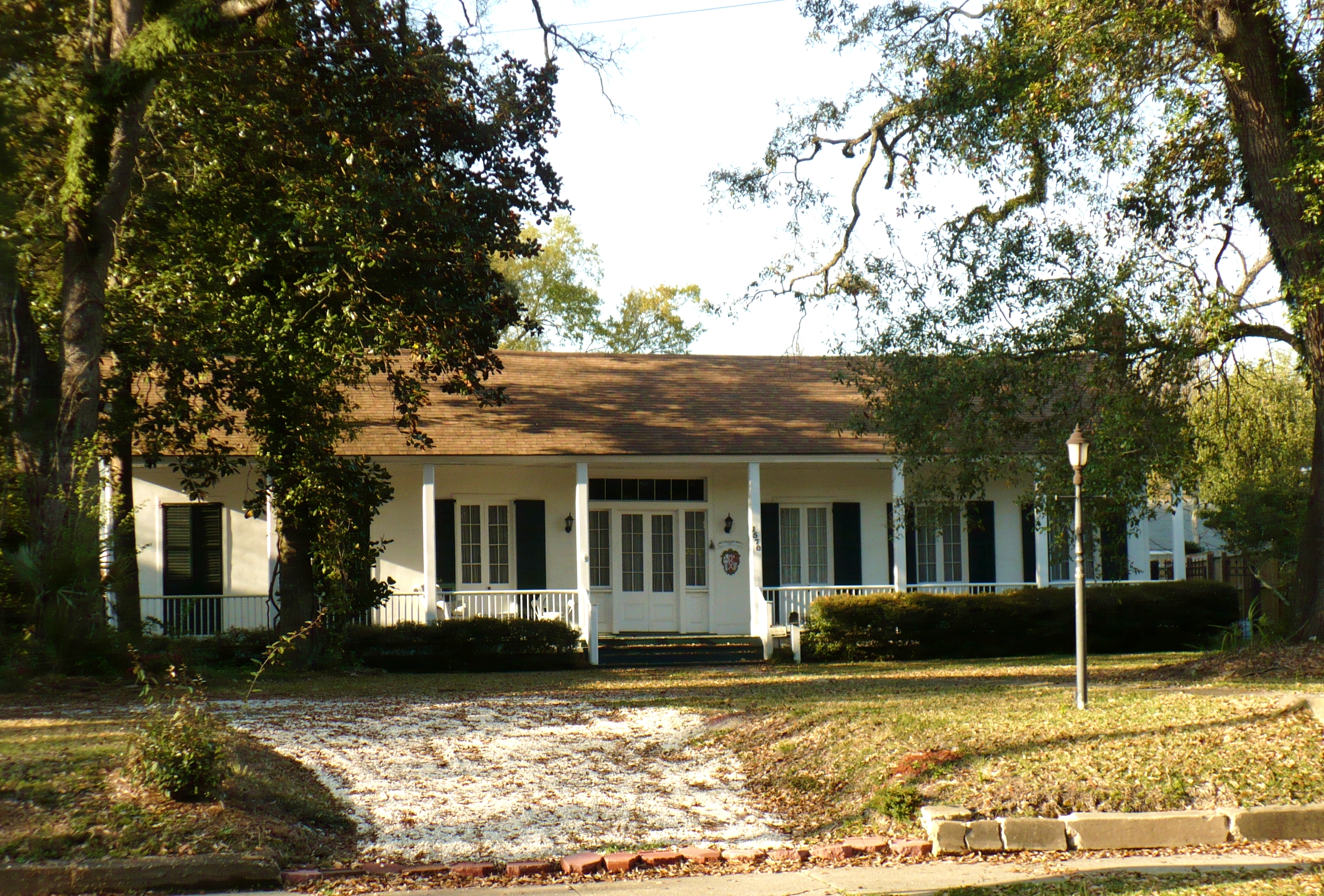

- Location within Mobile, Alabama Location within Alabama Location within the United States
- Location: 1570-1572 Dauphin Street; Mobile, Alabama
- Coordinates: 30°41′15″N 88°4′31″W
- Built: 1841
- Architectural style: Creole plantation
- NRHP reference No.: 74000427
- Added to NRHP: June 20, 1974

The Gates–Daves House, also known as The Daves Place, is a historic residence in Mobile, Alabama. The one-story structure was built in 1841 with a Creole architectural influence, the best remaining example of its type in Mobile. It was placed on the National Register of Historic Places on June 20, 1974, due to its architectural significance.

== History ==
The Gates–Daves House stands on a portion of a Spanish land grant deeded to Antonio Espejo during Mobile's colonial period. In 1841 the property was purchased by Hezekiah Gates from Charles Dellinger for $3500, local tradition maintains that the house was constructed that same year. Gates's widow, Adele then sold the house to Camellia Bull in 1850 and she in turn sold to Thomas K. Daves in 1856.

== Architectural characteristics ==
The house is a wood-frame structure on low brick piers. It originally comprised a main block measuring 57 feet (17 m) wide and 27 feet (8.2 m) deep, with projecting rear wings. The rear portion was remodeled in the 20th century. The unaltered front portion features a seven bay facade with French doors set into each bay, the central door is surrounded by sidelights and a transom window.
