= Rainbow Boulevard (Kansas City, Kansas) =

Roadway in Kansas, USA

Rainbow Boulevard is a main roadway located in southeastern Wyandotte County and northeastern Johnson County, Kansas. It is an undivided four-lane roadway with a posted speed limit of 35 mph that runs north–south through the Kansas City metropolitan area.

Its northern terminus is just south of Interstate 35 at Southwest Boulevard in Kansas City, Kansas. Its southern terminus is at Shawnee Mission Parkway in Mission Woods, Kansas.

== Name ==
Rainbow Boulevard was named to commemorate the World War I veterans of Rosedale, Kansas, and of the Kansas City metropolitan area. Upon America entering the war, it was decided that the first division of National Guard troops to be called up should be drawn from as many states as possible. The new division was designated the 42nd United States Infantry Division and allotments for twenty-six states were drawn up. This mixture prompted Secretary of War Baker to nickname the 42nd the Rainbow Division.

== Highway route ==
=== Current Highways ===
- U.S. Route 169 - US 169 has always existed along Rainbow Boulevard since its commissioning. It continues south from the 7th Street Trafficway, the name of Rainbow north of Southwest Blvd., and follows the entire length of Rainbow to Shawnee Mission Parkway, where it duplexes with U.S. Route 56 and heads west.

== Cities traversed ==
- Kansas City, Kansas
- Westwood, Kansas
- Westwood Hills, Kansas
- Mission Woods, Kansas
