= Kansas City Steak Company =

Steak processor

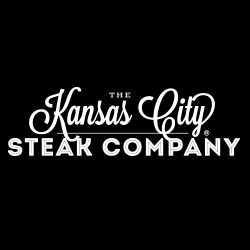
- Company type: Private
- Industry: Food
- Founded: 1932; 94 years ago
- Headquarters: Kansas City, Missouri, U.S.
- Key people: David Grosenheider (president, Consumer Division)
- Products: Steak, Poultry, Seafood
- Website: www.kansascitysteaks.com

Kansas City Steak Company based in Kansas City, Missouri, manufactures and markets premium beef (including USDA Prime beef), poultry, seafood, and other foods for foodservice and home delivery.

== History ==
Kansas City Steak Company was founded by Giovanni Scavuzzo during the Great Depression. He opened the S&S Meat Company butcher shop in 1932 with sons Santo, Edward and Carlo. The retail store operated for nearly 50 years.

In 1980, the family decided to focus entirely on foodservice, delivering meat to hotels and restaurants around the Kansas City, Missouri area.

When Ed Scavuzzo, great-grandson of the company's founder, joined the business in 1984, he focused on a new venture: a mail order catalog. Capitalizing on Kansas City’s reputation for premier steaks, he called the mail order portion of the business Kansas City Steak Co.

The catalog business grew during the 1980s but only accounted for 8-10 percent of the company’s revenues. In 1995, Kansas City Steak Company signed a deal with televised home shopping channel QVC.

Today, managed by David Grosenheider (president, consumer division), The Kansas City Steak Company distributes meat products to restaurants across the United States and delivers packaged gourmet products nationwide.

== Products ==
Kansas City Steak Company uses Midwestern corn-fed beef to create and sell Filet Mignon, Kansas City strips, top sirloin, T-bones, Porterhouse and ribeye steaks, beef roasts and Steakburgers. The company's offerings include their Private Stock line of USDA Prime beef and American Style Kobe beef. A selection of poultry, pork, seafood and desserts complete the company's product offerings.
