= Memorial Hall (Kansas City, Kansas) =

Auditorium in Kansas, United States

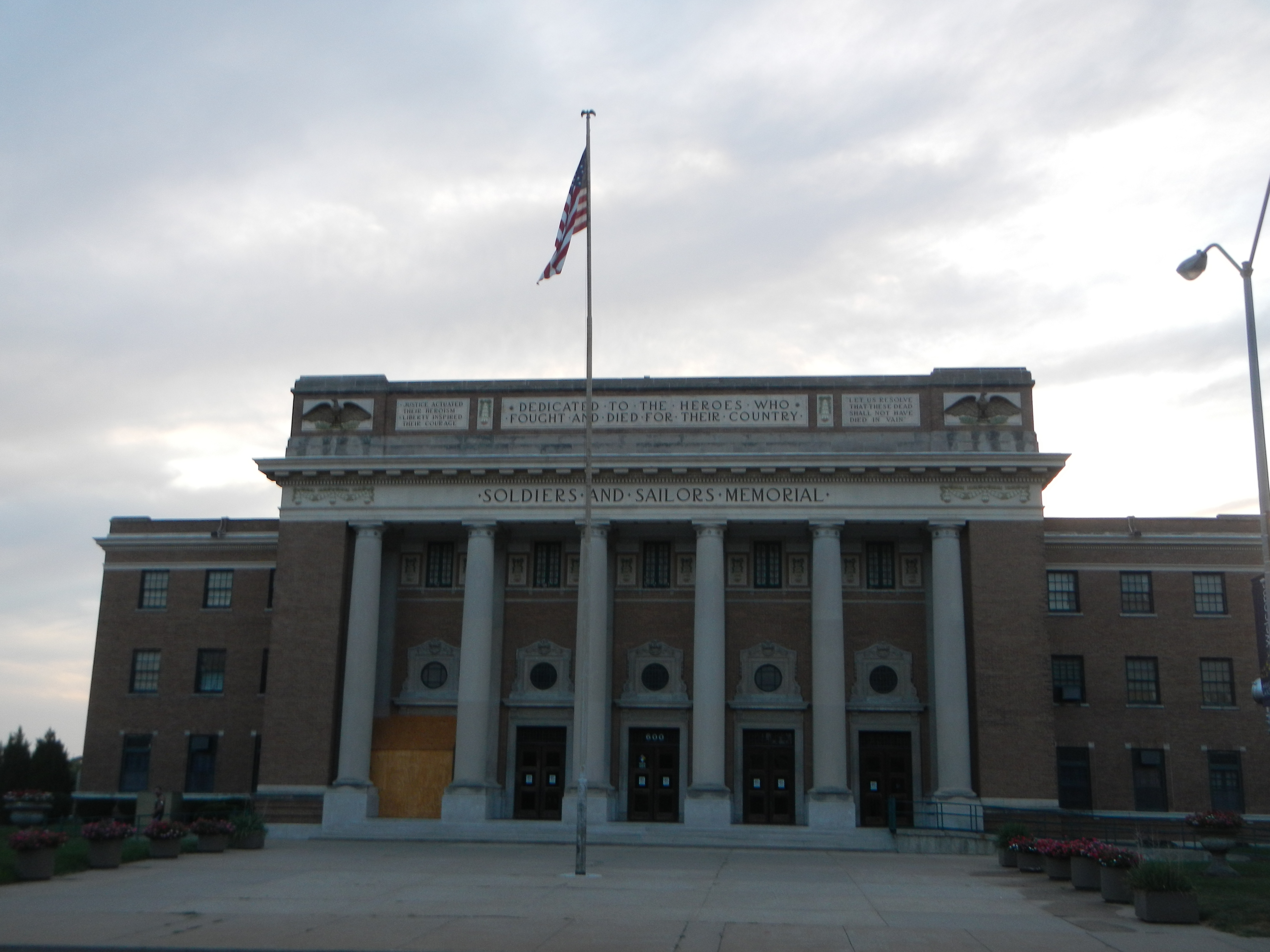
- Interactive map of Memorial Hall
- Full name: Soldiers and Sailors Memorial Building
- Location: 600 North 7th Street; Kansas City, Kansas 66101; United States
- Coordinates: 39.112352°N 94.62761°W
- Capacity: 3,500
- Acreage: 2.2 acres (0.89 ha)

Construction
- Built: 1923; 103 years ago
- Opened: 1925; 101 years ago
- Architects: David Burton Peterson, Rose & Peterson Architects
- Project manager: David Burton Peterson

Tenant
- Kansas City Steers (ABL) (1961-1963)

Memorial Hall, or Soldiers and Sailors Memorial Building, is a multi-purpose auditorium located in Kansas City, Kansas. The 3,500-seat auditorium, which has a permanent stage, is used for public assemblies, concerts and sporting events. It was listed on the National Register of Historic Places in 1985. It was designed by architects Rose & Peterson in Georgian style.

== Establishment ==
This venue was built in 1923 then opened in 1925 as a combination civic auditorium and war memorial for World War I veterans.

== Events ==
Many iconic rock bands in the 1960s and 1970s played here. During its September 11, 1972 concert at Memorial Hall, Pink Floyd performed its first Kansas City metro concert and new concept album, The Dark Side of the Moon, five months before the record-setting album's release. REO Speedwagon recorded parts of their first live album, 1977's Live: You Get What You Play For, including the album's closing track, "Golden Country," at the venue on October 31, 1976. Side 4 of Peter Gabriel's 1983 double-LP, Plays Live, including the songs "Shock the Monkey", "Humdrum", "On the Air", and "Biko", was recorded at Memorial Hall on December 4, 1982.

=== Roller Derby ===
Memorial hall is home to the 20+ year WFTDA sanctioned Kansas City Roller Warriors various roller derby teams. KCRW often hosts out of town and international roller derby teams from around the country and globe. The league is made up of 100+ volunteers consisting of KC metro and surrounding residents that volunteer their time, effort and passion to making KCRW a successful organization. Memorial Hall hosted some games of the Kansas City Steers of the American Basketball League from 1961 to 1963.

=== Professional Wrestling ===
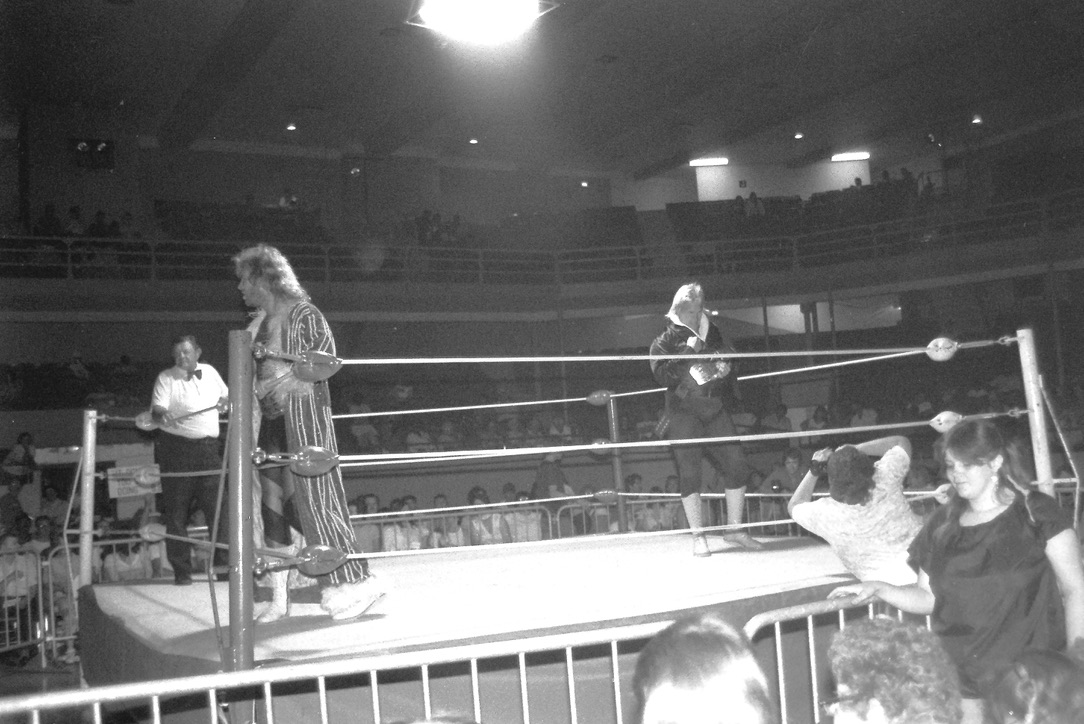
John Tatum and Jack Victory at Memorial Hall in 1988

The earliest documented Pro Wrestling event at Memorial Hall took place on February 23, 1931, when Charlie Fischer defeated Billy Wolfe in 39 minutes.

From the early 30's until the mid-1940s, Professional Wrestling ran twice a week all year long at Memorial Hall. From 1946- 1987, Professional Wrestling was held once a week, all year round.

Professional wrestling was a Thursday-night tradition at the venue in the 1970s and 80's, presented by Central States Wrestling with cards often taped for the All-Star Wrestling telecast the following Sunday.

After Bob Geigel closed down his World Wrestling Alliance, World Championship Wrestling ran there five times between 1990 and 1997.

On April 23, 2009, the movie "K.C. On The Mat: The History of Professional Wrestling in Kansas City," premiered at Memorial Hall. The documentary focuses heavily on the importance of Memorial Hall. Legends of the past like Harley Race, Butch Reed, Roger Kirby and Bob Geigel all attended the premier.

=== Other Events ===
The Kansas City, Kansas Public Schools district holds an annual convocation for staff at the venue each August. All district staff are present for this event.

== Notable Concerts and Events ==
Nirvana played with Mudhoney and Jawbreaker on 10/21/93

February 2, 1989, the World Wrestling Alliance and All Japan Pro Wrestling partnered in presenting "The International Bash" featuring the only match ever between the Rock 'n' Roll Express and The British Bulldogs. The two teams wrestled to a thirty-minute draw with former NWA World Champion Pat O'Connor serving as special referee.

Mötley Crüe played May 17, 1984 as part of their Shout at the Devil tour

Ric Flair defeated Dusty Rhodes to win the NWA Worlds Heavyweight Championship for his first time on September 17, 1981

Peter Gabriel played December 4, 1982 Security Tour

The Grateful Dead played eight times between 1969 and 1979 - the first of these shows taking place on February 5, 1969, and the last on December 11, 1979 .

Blue Öyster Cult and New York Dolls played on September 20, 1974

Janis Joplin played two shows (6pm and 8pm) on June 14, 1970

Led Zeppelin played 2 Shows on November 5, 1969 (7:00pm & 9:30pm) with tickets costing $3.50, $4.50, and $5.50. Jon Bonham was tired by the 2nd show. He kept passing out at the drum kit, being held up at times by roadies.

Michael Hayes (wrestler) defeated Buddy Roberts in a Steel cage match on July 16, 1988.

Patsy Cline, George Jones, and others played three "standing room only" shows on March 3, 1963. This would be Patsy Cline's final performance as she died in an airplane crash 2 days later.

== See also ==
- 1925 in architecture
