= Judge Louis Gates House =

Historic house in Kansas, United States

- U.S. National Register of Historic Places
- The house in 2021

- Location within Kansas Location within the United States
- Location: 4146 Cambridge St., Kansas City, Kansas
- Coordinates: 39°3′7.9″N 94°36′31.2″W
- Area: 1 acre (0.40 ha)
- Built: 1923
- Architect: Clarence Shepard
- Architectural style: Prairie School
- NRHP reference No.: 80001477
- Added to NRHP: December 1, 1980

The Judge Louis R. Gates House is located at 4146 Cambridge Street in Kansas City, Kansas. Clarence E. Shepard was the architect of this example of a Prairie School residence. It was placed on the Register of Historic Kansas Places on July 3, 1979, and on the National Register of Historic Places on December 1, 1980. It was designated a Kansas City Historic Landmark on August 26, 1982.

It is a two-story Prairie School house with a hipped roof, wide eaves, and a side entrance porch. The main portion is 25 by 38 feet (7.6 m × 11.6 m) in plan; a 7 by 15 feet (2.1 m × 4.6 m) one-story extension to the rear holds a breakfast room and a rear entrance.
