= Kansas City, Kansas =

City in Kansas, United States

- Consolidated city-county
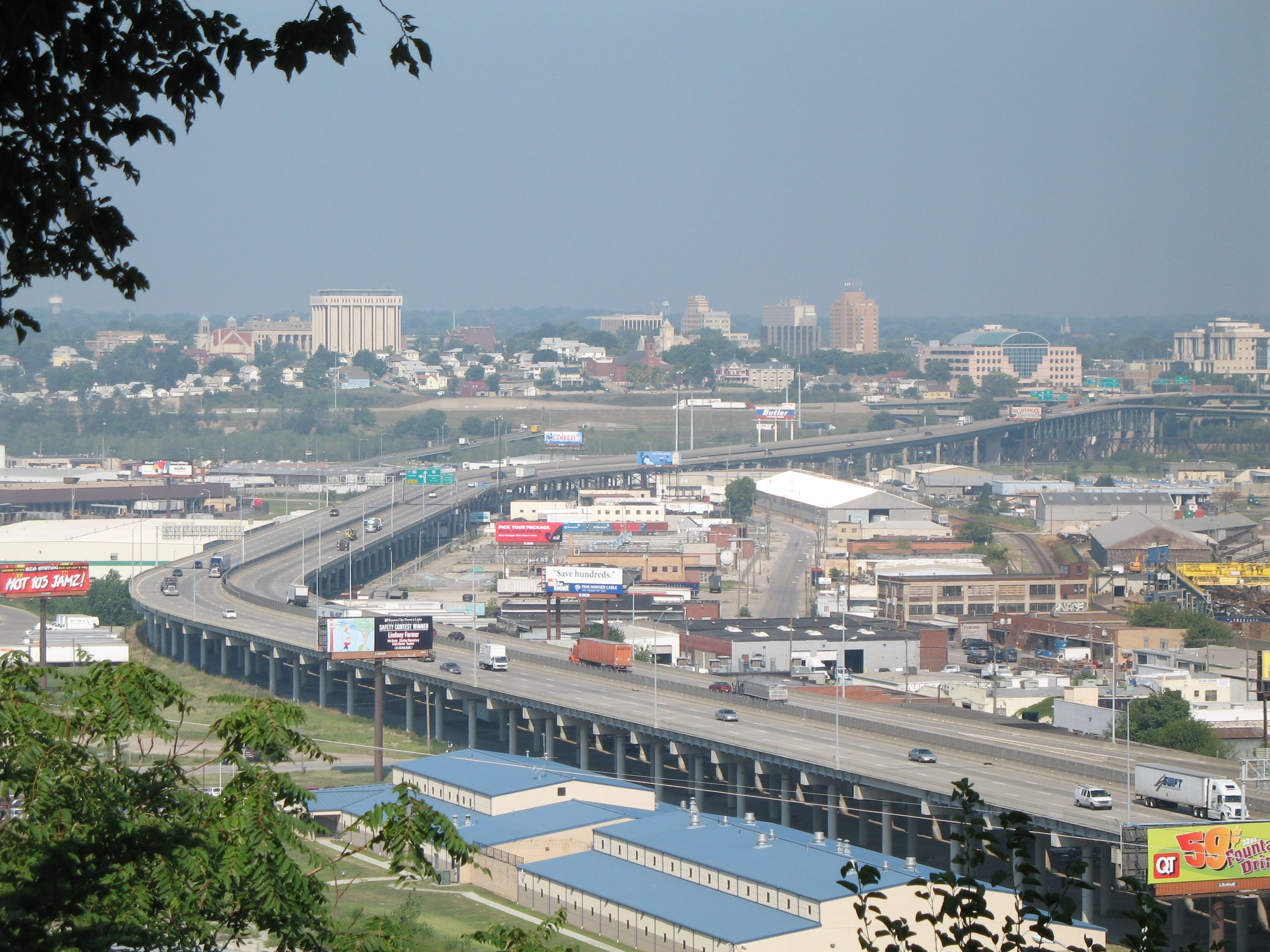
- Cityscape of Kansas City, Kansas

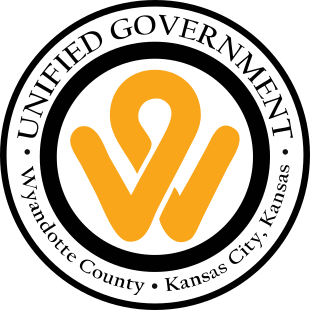
- Flag Seal
- Nickname: "KCK"
- Location within Wyandotte County and Kansas
- Interactive map of Kansas City, Kansas
- Coordinates: 39°6′24″N 94°40′35″W
- Country: United States
- State: Kansas
- County: Wyandotte
- Incorporated: 1872, 1886
- Named for: Kansas City, Missouri

Government
  - Type: Mayor–Council
  - Mayor: Christal E. Watson

Area
  - Total: 128.31 sq mi (332.31 km^{2})
  - Land: 124.74 sq mi (323.07 km^{2})
  - Water: 3.57 sq mi (9.24 km^{2})
- Elevation: 869 ft (265 m)

Population (2020)
  - Total: 156,607
  - Estimate (2024): 156,752 ▲
  - Density: 1,255.5/sq mi (484.75/km^{2})
- Time zone: UTC-6 (CST)
  - Summer (DST): UTC-5 (CDT)
- ZIP Codes: 66101–66113, 66115, 66117–66119, 66160
- Area code: 913
- FIPS code: 20-36000
- GNIS ID: 478635
- Website: wycokck.org

Kansas City (commonly known as KCK) is the third-most populous city in the U.S. state of Kansas and the county seat of Wyandotte County. It is an inner suburb of the older and more populous Kansas City, Missouri, after which it is named. As of the 2020 census, the population of the city was 156,607, making it one of four principal cities in the Kansas City metropolitan area. It is situated at Kaw Point, the junction of the Missouri and Kansas rivers. It is part of a consolidated city-county government known as the "Unified Government". It is the location of the University of Kansas Medical Center and Kansas City Kansas Community College.

== History ==
Kansas City can trace its origins back to the earlier city of Wyandotte (also called "Wyandotte City"), which was incorporated by an act of the Kansas Territorial legislature on January 29, 1859. In October 1872, "old" Kansas City, Kansas, was incorporated under its current name. The first city election was held on October 22 of that year by order of Judge Hiram Stevens of the Tenth Judicial District and resulted in the election of Mayor James Boyle. The mayors of the city after its organization were James Boyle, C. A. Eidemiller, A. S. Orbison, Eli Teed, and Samuel McConnell. In June 1880, the Governor of Kansas, John St. John, proclaimed the city of Kansas City a city of the second class with Mayor McConnell present.

In March 1886, "new" Kansas City, Kansas, was formed through the consolidation of five municipalities: "old" Kansas City, Armstrong, Armourdale, Riverview, and Wyandotte. The oldest city of the group was Wyandotte, which was formed in 1857 by Wyandot Native Americans and Methodist missionaries.

In the 1890s, the city saw an explosive growth in population as a streetcar suburb of Kansas City, Missouri. This growth continued until the 1930s. It was one of the nation's 100 largest cities for many U.S. Census counts, from 1890 to 1960, including 1920, when it had a population of over 100,000 residents for the first time.

As with adjacent Kansas City, Missouri, the percentage of the city's most populous ethnic group, non-Hispanic White, has declined from 76.3% in 1970 to 40.2% in 2010. In 1997, voters approved a proposition to unify the city and county governments, creating the Unified Government of Wyandotte County.

== Geography ==
According to the United States Census Bureau, the city has a total area of 128.38 square miles (332.50 km^{2}), of which, 124.81 square miles (323.26 km^{2}) is land and 3.57 square miles (9.25 km^{2}) is water.

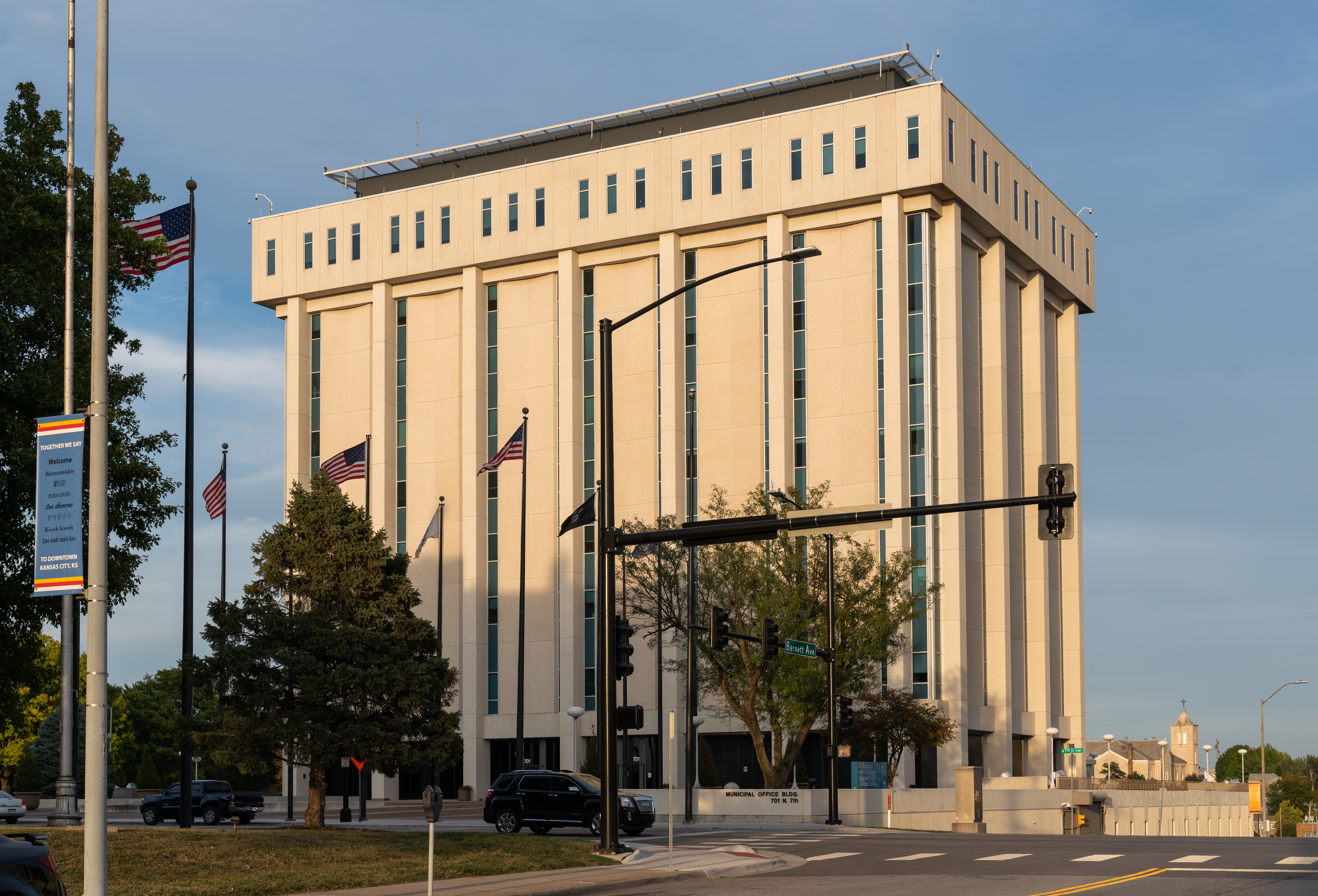
Kansas City Municipal Office Building (City Hall) at 701 North 7th Street (2018)

=== Neighborhoods ===
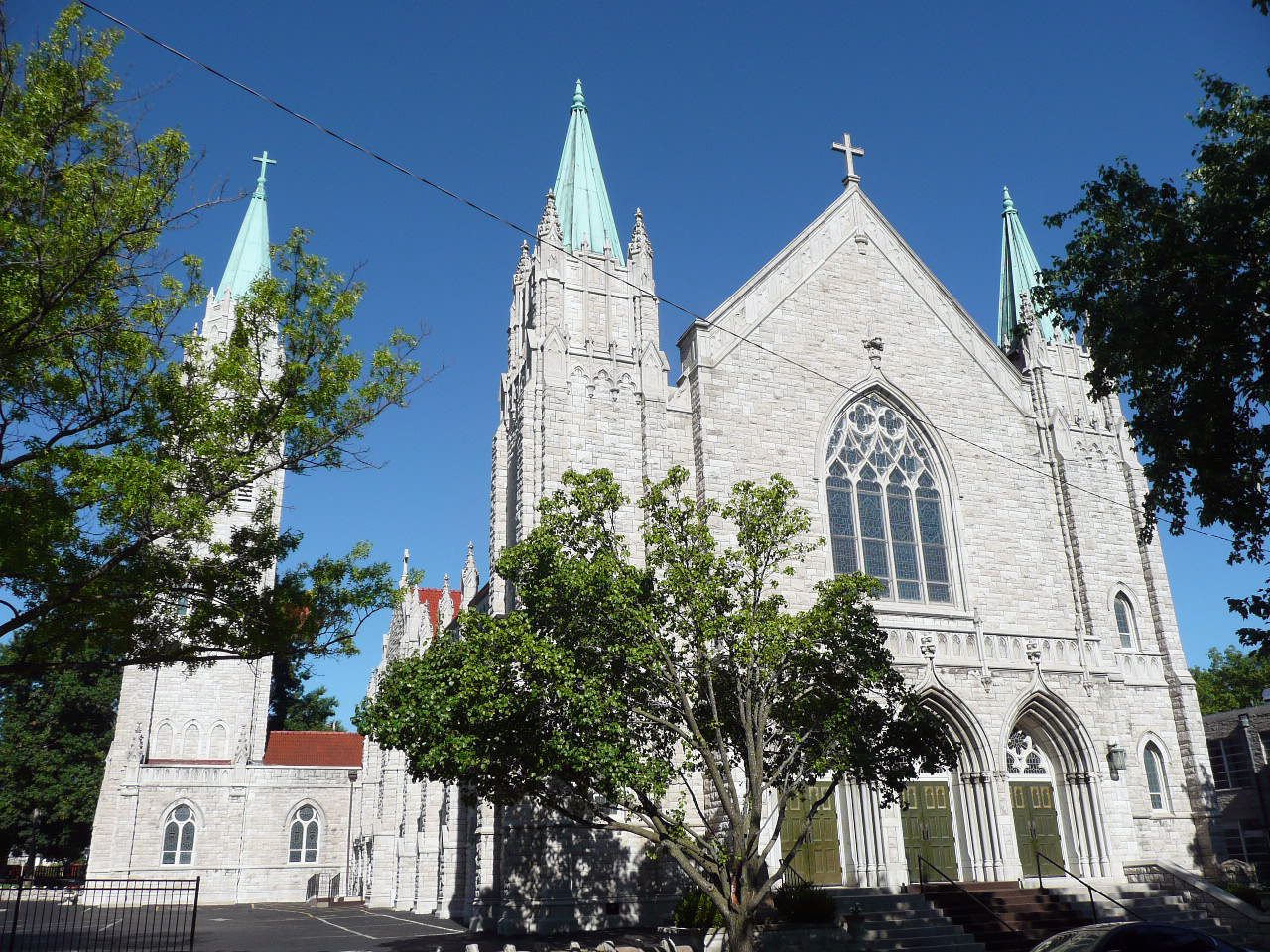
The Cathedral of Saint Peter

Neighborhoods of Kansas City, Kansas, include the following:

- Downtown
- Argentine – former home to the silver smelter for which it was named; it was consolidated with Kansas City in 1910
- Armourdale – formerly a city, it was consolidated with the city of Kansas City in 1886
- Armstrong – a small town sitting on the northern bluff of the Kansas River, absorbed in the merger of Wyandotte, Kansas City, and Armourdale
- Arrickary Subdivision
- Bethel – a neighborhood located generally along Leavenworth Rd., between 72nd and 77th Streets. It was never incorporated as a municipality
- Fairfax District – an industrial area along the Missouri River
- Hanover Heights
- Historic Westheight
- Muncie
- Maywood – until the late 1990s, Maywood was a quiet, isolated residential area; it is now part of the "Village West" project that includes the Legends shopping and entertainment district, the Sporting Park soccer stadium, Monarchs' Community America baseball park, the Kansas Speedway racetrack and Hollywood Casino at Kansas Speedway
- McGrew Grove
- Nearman
- Northeast Neighborhoods
- Parkwood
- Piper
- Polish Hill
- Pomeroy – a late-19th—early-20th-century Train Depot, Trading Post, Saw Mill, and river landing for barges to load and unload
- Quindaro Bluffs
- Riverview – like Armstrong, a small town on the northern river bluff, absorbed in the merger of Wyandotte, Kansas City, and Armourdale
- Rosedale – consolidated with Kansas City in 1922
- Stony Point
- Strawberry Hill
- Turner – community around the Wyandotte-Johnson County border to the Kansas River north-south, and from I-635 to I-435 east-west
- Vinewood
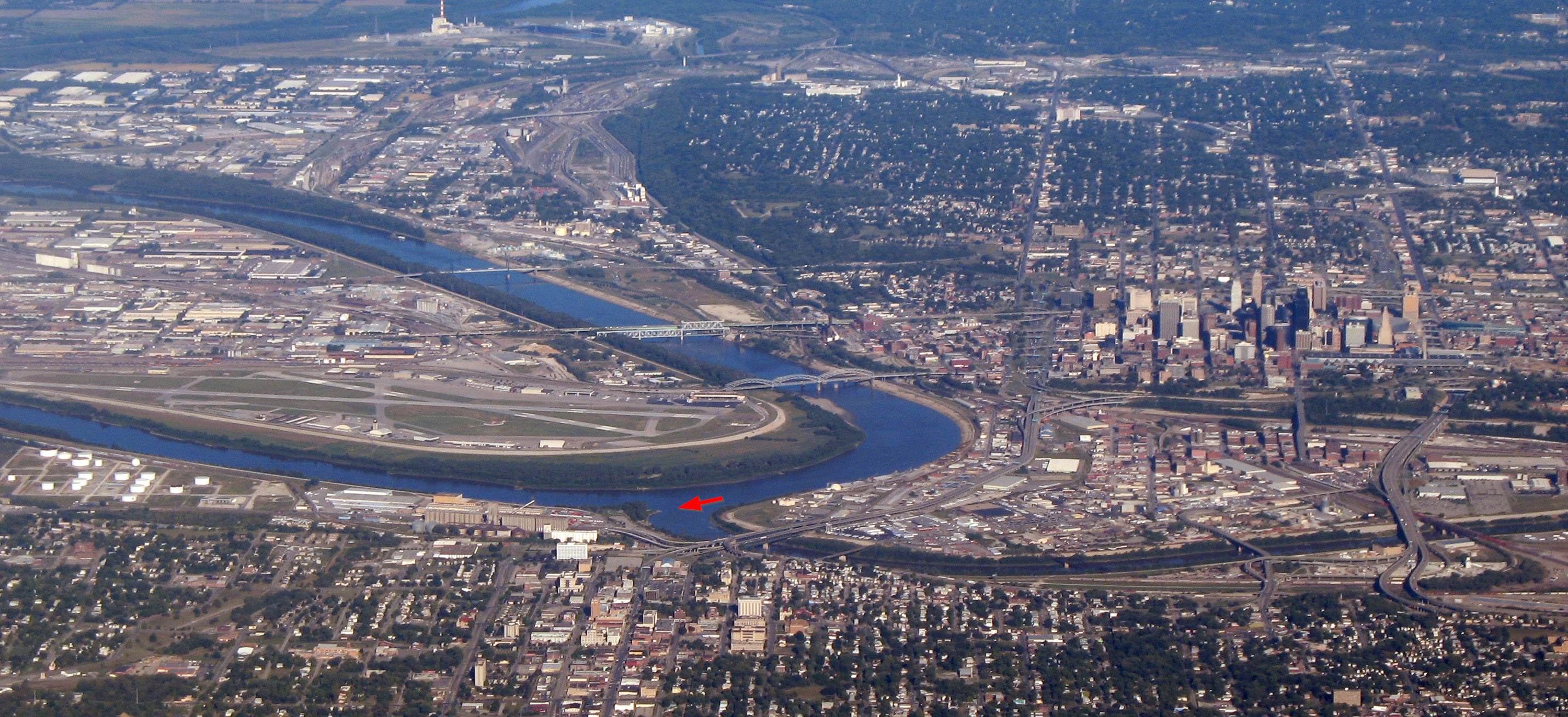
  Kaw Point Park from the west (2007, highlighted by red arrow)
- Wolcott
- Welborn

=== Parks and parkways ===
- City Park

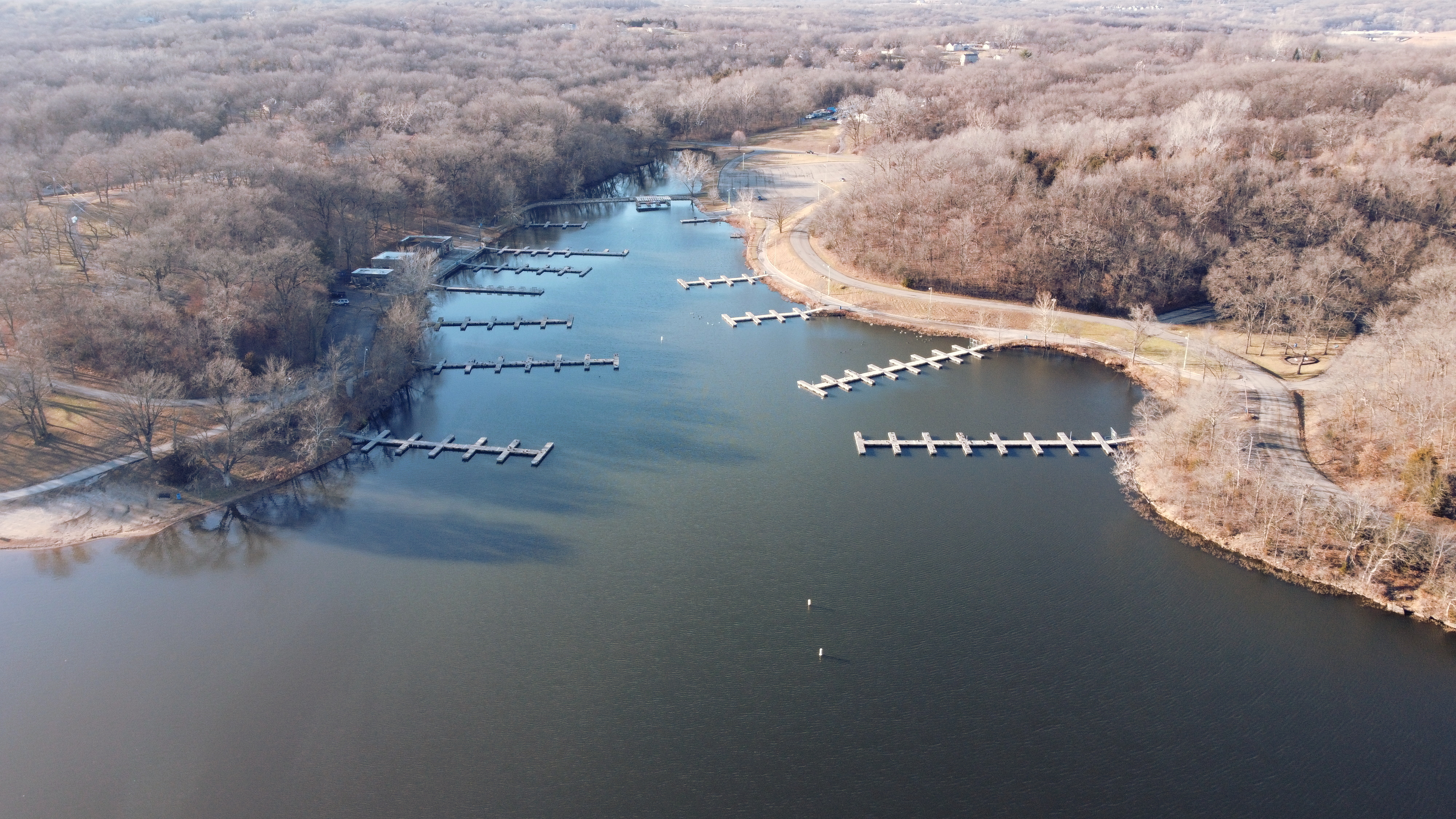
Wyandotte County Lake Park

- Wyandotte County Lake Park
- Big Eleven Park
- Boston Daniels' Park (Dedicated to the first Black Chief of Police in the United States)
- Kaw Point Park

=== Climate ===
Kansas City lies in the Midwestern United States, as well as near the geographic center of the country, at the confluence of the longest river in the country, the Missouri River, and the Kansas River (also known as the Kaw River). The city lies in the humid continental climate (Köppen Dfa) zone, with four distinct seasons and moderate precipitation, and is part of USDA plant hardiness zone 6. Being located in the center of North America, far removed from a significant body of water, there is significant potential for extremes of hot and cold swings in temperature throughout the year. Unless otherwise stated, normal figures below are based on data from 1981 to 2010 at Downtown Airport. The warmest month of the year is July, with a 24-hour average temperature of 81.0 °F (27.2 °C). The summer months are hot but can get very hot and moderately humid, with moist air riding up from the Gulf of Mexico. High temperatures surpass 100 °F (38 °C) on 5.6 days of the year and 90 °F (32 °C) on 47 days. The coldest month of the year is January, with an average temperature of 31.0 °F (−0.6 °C). Winters are cold, with 22 days where the high is at or below the freezing mark and 2.5 nights with a low at or below 0 °F (−18 °C). The official record maximum temperature is 113 °F (45 °C), set on August 14, 1936, at Downtown Airport, while the official record minimum temperature is −23 °F (−31 °C), set on December 22 and 23, 1989. Normal seasonal snowfall is 13.4 inches (34 cm) at Downtown Airport and 18.8 in (48 cm) at Kansas City International Airport. The average window for freezing temperatures is October 31 to April 4, while for measurable (0.1 in or 0.25 cm) snowfall, it is November 27 to March 16 as measured at Kansas City International Airport. Precipitation, both in frequency and total accumulation, shows a marked uptick in late spring and summer.

Kansas City is situated on the edge of the "Tornado Alley", a broad region where cold air from the Rocky Mountains in Canada collides with warm air from the Gulf of Mexico, leading to the formation of powerful storms, especially during the spring. A few areas of the Kansas City Metropolitan Area have had some severe outbreaks of tornadoes at different points in the past, including the Ruskin Heights tornado in 1957, the May 2003 tornado outbreak sequence, and the tornado outbreak of May 25–30, 2019. The region can also fall victim to sporadic ice storms during the winter months, such as the 2002 ice storm during which hundreds of thousands lost power for days and (in some cases) weeks. Kansas City and its outlying areas are also subject to flooding, including the Great Flood of 1951 and the Great Flood of 1993.

Climate data for Kansas City, Missouri (Downtown Airport), 1991–2020 normals, (Note: Mean monthly maxima and minima (i.e. the expected highest and lowest temperature readings at any point during the year or given month) calculated based on data at said location from 1991 to 2020.) extremes 1934–present)
Month	Jan	Feb	Mar	Apr	May	Jun	Jul	Aug	Sep	Oct	Nov	Dec	Year
Record high °F (°C)	76 (24)	83 (28)	95 (35)	94 (34)	103 (39)	108 (42)	112 (44)	113 (45)	109 (43)	98 (37)	83 (28)	75 (24)	113 (45)
Mean maximum °F (°C)	62.9 (17.2)	68.4 (20.2)	78.6 (25.9)	84.3 (29.1)	90.1 (32.3)	95.4 (35.2)	100.0 (37.8)	99.9 (37.7)	93.8 (34.3)	86.0 (30.0)	73.5 (23.1)	65.2 (18.4)	101.7 (38.7)
Mean daily maximum °F (°C)	39.9 (4.4)	45.1 (7.3)	56.6 (13.7)	66.8 (19.3)	76.2 (24.6)	85.8 (29.9)	90.2 (32.3)	88.6 (31.4)	80.4 (26.9)	68.2 (20.1)	54.5 (12.5)	43.9 (6.6)	66.3 (19.1)
Daily mean °F (°C)	31.0 (−0.6)	35.8 (2.1)	46.4 (8.0)	56.5 (13.6)	66.7 (19.3)	76.5 (24.7)	81.0 (27.2)	79.2 (26.2)	70.7 (21.5)	58.4 (14.7)	45.4 (7.4)	35.3 (1.8)	56.9 (13.8)
Mean daily minimum °F (°C)	22.2 (−5.4)	26.4 (−3.1)	36.2 (2.3)	46.3 (7.9)	57.2 (14.0)	67.2 (19.6)	71.9 (22.2)	69.9 (21.1)	61.0 (16.1)	48.7 (9.3)	36.3 (2.4)	26.7 (−2.9)	47.5 (8.6)
Mean minimum °F (°C)	2.7 (−16.3)	8.4 (−13.1)	16.4 (−8.7)	31.0 (−0.6)	42.6 (5.9)	55.1 (12.8)	62.4 (16.9)	60.1 (15.6)	46.4 (8.0)	32.4 (0.2)	19.7 (−6.8)	8.2 (−13.2)	−0.7 (−18.2)
Record low °F (°C)	−14 (−26)	−13 (−25)	−3 (−19)	16 (−9)	32 (0)	44 (7)	52 (11)	48 (9)	34 (1)	21 (−6)	5 (−15)	−19 (−28)	−19 (−28)
Average precipitation inches (mm)	1.02 (26)	1.53 (39)	2.08 (53)	3.89 (99)	5.10 (130)	5.33 (135)	4.38 (111)	4.68 (119)	3.78 (96)	3.24 (82)	1.80 (46)	1.30 (33)	38.13 (969)
Average snowfall inches (cm)	3.4 (8.6)	3.2 (8.1)	0.4 (1.0)	0.1 (0.25)	0.0 (0.0)	0.0 (0.0)	0.0 (0.0)	0.0 (0.0)	0.0 (0.0)	0.3 (0.76)	0.1 (0.25)	3.5 (8.9)	11.0 (28)
Average precipitation days (≥ 0.01 in)	4.6	4.8	6.8	9.3	11.0	9.5	7.9	7.8	7.6	7.0	5.2	4.6	86.1
Average snowy days (≥ 0.1 in)	2.2	1.6	0.4	0.1	0.0	0.0	0.0	0.0	0.0	0.1	0.1	1.9	6.4
Source: NOAA

Climate data for Kansas City Int'l, Missouri (1991–2020 normals, extremes 1888–present) (Note: Official records for Kansas City kept at downtown/Weather Bureau Office from July 1888 to December 1933; Downtown Airport from January 1934 to September 1972; and Kansas City Int'l since October 1972. For more information see ThreadEx.)
Month	Jan	Feb	Mar	Apr	May	Jun	Jul	Aug	Sep	Oct	Nov	Dec	Year
Record high °F (°C)	75 (24)	83 (28)	93 (34)	95 (35)	103 (39)	108 (42)	112 (44)	113 (45)	109 (43)	98 (37)	83 (28)	74 (23)	113 (45)
Mean maximum °F (°C)	62.0 (16.7)	67.5 (19.7)	78.8 (26.0)	84.5 (29.2)	88.9 (31.6)	93.5 (34.2)	97.9 (36.6)	98.1 (36.7)	92.6 (33.7)	85.9 (29.9)	72.6 (22.6)	64.3 (17.9)	99.7 (37.6)
Mean daily maximum °F (°C)	38.4 (3.6)	43.6 (6.4)	55.4 (13.0)	65.5 (18.6)	75.0 (23.9)	84.2 (29.0)	88.3 (31.3)	87.1 (30.6)	79.2 (26.2)	67.2 (19.6)	53.5 (11.9)	42.3 (5.7)	65.0 (18.3)
Daily mean °F (°C)	29.0 (−1.7)	33.6 (0.9)	44.5 (6.9)	54.6 (12.6)	64.6 (18.1)	74.1 (23.4)	78.2 (25.7)	76.7 (24.8)	68.4 (20.2)	56.4 (13.6)	43.6 (6.4)	33.1 (0.6)	54.7 (12.6)
Mean daily minimum °F (°C)	19.5 (−6.9)	23.6 (−4.7)	33.6 (0.9)	43.7 (6.5)	54.3 (12.4)	64.0 (17.8)	68.1 (20.1)	66.3 (19.1)	57.5 (14.2)	45.6 (7.6)	33.6 (0.9)	23.9 (−4.5)	44.5 (6.9)
Mean minimum °F (°C)	−1.5 (−18.6)	4.3 (−15.4)	13.3 (−10.4)	27.8 (−2.3)	39.4 (4.1)	51.6 (10.9)	58.3 (14.6)	56.0 (13.3)	41.9 (5.5)	28.5 (−1.9)	16.3 (−8.7)	4.4 (−15.3)	−5.2 (−20.7)
Record low °F (°C)	−20 (−29)	−22 (−30)	−10 (−23)	12 (−11)	27 (−3)	42 (6)	51 (11)	43 (6)	31 (−1)	17 (−8)	1 (−17)	−23 (−31)	−23 (−31)
Average precipitation inches (mm)	1.16 (29)	1.48 (38)	2.36 (60)	4.05 (103)	5.32 (135)	5.25 (133)	4.58 (116)	4.24 (108)	4.04 (103)	3.25 (83)	2.00 (51)	1.57 (40)	39.30 (998)
Average snowfall inches (cm)	4.9 (12)	5.9 (15)	1.7 (4.3)	0.3 (0.76)	0.0 (0.0)	0.0 (0.0)	0.0 (0.0)	0.0 (0.0)	0.0 (0.0)	0.3 (0.76)	1.1 (2.8)	4.0 (10)	18.2 (46)
Average extreme snow depth inches (cm)	3.2 (8.1)	3.4 (8.6)	1.9 (4.8)	0.1 (0.25)	0.0 (0.0)	0.0 (0.0)	0.0 (0.0)	0.0 (0.0)	0.0 (0.0)	0.1 (0.25)	0.6 (1.5)	2.4 (6.1)	5.3 (13)
Average precipitation days (≥ 0.01 in)	6.8	6.7	9.5	11.3	12.1	10.2	9.0	8.4	8.3	8.1	6.8	6.5	103.7
Average snowy days (≥ 0.1 in)	4.4	3.1	1.7	0.4	0.0	0.0	0.0	0.0	0.0	0.2	1.0	3.0	13.8
Average relative humidity (%)	68.8	69.6	66.7	62.9	68.0	69.2	67.4	70.0	70.4	67.1	69.7	71.0	68.4
Average dew point °F (°C)	16.5 (−8.6)	21.4 (−5.9)	31.6 (−0.2)	40.6 (4.8)	52.0 (11.1)	61.5 (16.4)	65.8 (18.8)	64.4 (18.0)	56.7 (13.7)	43.5 (6.4)	32.5 (0.3)	21.0 (−6.1)	42.3 (5.7)
Mean monthly sunshine hours	183.7	174.3	223.9	257.8	285.0	305.5	329.3	293.9	240.5	213.6	155.3	147.1	2,809.9
Percentage possible sunshine	61	58	60	65	64	68	74	69	64	62	52	50	63
Average ultraviolet index	2	3	5	7	8	9	10	9	7	4	3	2	6
Source: NOAA (relative humidity, dew point, and sun 1972–1990)

== Demographics ==
Historical population
Census	Pop.	Note	%±
1880	3,200		—
1890	38,316		1,097.4%
1900	51,418		34.2%
1910	82,331		60.1%
1920	101,177		22.9%
1930	121,857		20.4%
1940	121,458		−0.3%
1950	129,553		6.7%
1960	121,901		−5.9%
1970	168,213		38.0%
1980	161,087		−4.2%
1990	149,767		−7.0%
2000	146,866		−1.9%
2010	145,786		−0.7%
2020	156,607		7.4%
2025 (est.)	157,805		0.8%
U.S. Decennial Census; 2010–2020

Historical racial profile	2020	2010	1990	1970	1950
White	41.0%	52.2%	65.0%	78.9%	79.4%
—Non-Hispanic	34.5%	40.2%	61.9%	76.3%	N/A
Black or African American	21.5%	26.8%	15.8%	10.7%	9.9%
Hispanic or Latino (of any race)	34.6%	27.8%	7.1%	3.2%	N/A
Asian	4.85%	2.7%	1.2%	0.1%	−

=== 2020 census ===
Kansas City, Kansas – Racial and ethnic composition Note: the US Census treats Hispanic/Latino as an ethnic category. This table excludes Latinos from the racial categories and assigns them to a separate category. Hispanics/Latinos may be of any race.
Race / Ethnicity (NH = Non-Hispanic)	Pop 2000	Pop 2010	Pop 2020	% 2000	% 2010	% 2020
White alone (NH)	71,870	58,655	53,962	48.94%	40.23%	34.46%
Black or African American alone (NH)	43,865	38,403	33,105	29.87%	26.34%	21.14%
Native American or Alaska Native alone (NH)	830	702	619	0.57%	0.48%	0.40%
Asian alone (NH)	2,477	3,815	7,512	1.69%	2.62%	4.80%
Native Hawaiian or Pacific Islander alone (NH)	39	136	347	0.03%	0.09%	0.22%
Other race alone (NH)	212	179	537	0.14%	0.12%	0.34%
Mixed race or Multiracial (NH)	2,934	3,374	6,381	2.00%	2.31%	4.07%
Hispanic or Latino (any race)	24,639	40,522	54,144	16.78%	27.80%	34.57%
Total	146,866	145,786	156,607	100.00%	100.00%	100.00%

The 2020 United States census counted 156,607 people, 57,079 households, and 36,392 families in Kansas City. The population density was 1,255.5 per square mile (484.7/km^{2}). There were 63,446 housing units at an average density of 508.6 per square mile (196.4/km^{2}).

The U.S. Census accounts for race by two methodologies. "Race alone" and "Race alone less Hispanics" where Hispanics are delineated separately as if a separate race.

The racial makeup (including Hispanics in the racial counts) was 40.98% (64,177) white or European American (34.46% non-Hispanic white), 21.53% (33,715) black or African-American, 1.14% (1,786) Native American or Alaska Native, 4.85% (7,590) Asian, 0.24% (370) Pacific Islander or Native Hawaiian, 16.07% (25,172) from other races, and 15.2% (23,797) from two or more races.

The racial and ethnic makeup (where Hispanics are excluded from the racial counts and placed in their own category) was 34.46% (53,962) White alone (non-Hispanic), 21.14% (33,105) Black alone (non-Hispanic), 0.40% (619) Native American alone (non-Hispanic), 4.80% (7,512) Asian alone (non-Hispanic), 0.22% (347) Pacific Islander alone (non-Hispanic), 0.34% (537) Other Race alone (non-Hispanic), 4.07% (6,381) Multiracial or Mixed Race (non-Hispanic), and 34.57% (54,144) Hispanic or Latino.

Of the 57,079 households, 34.9% had children under the age of 18; 38.2% were married couples living together; 30.7% had a female householder with no spouse or partner present. 29.2% of households consisted of individuals, and 10.2% had someone living alone who was 65 years of age or older. The average household size was 2.7, and the average family size was 3.5. The percent of those with a bachelor's degree or higher was estimated to be 12.0% of the population.

27.1% of the population was under the age of 18, 9.3% from 18 to 24, 28.0% from 25 to 44, 22.9% from 45 to 64, and 12.6% who were 65 years of age or older. The median age was 34.3 years. For every 100 females, there were 99.9 males. For every 100 females ages 18 and older, there were 101.8 males.

The 2016–2020 5-year American Community Survey estimates show that the median household income was $46,424 (with a margin of error of ±$1,298) and the median family income was $54,955 (±$2,431). Males had a median income of $32,908 (±$1,298) versus $26,001 (±$789) for females. The median income for those above 16 years old was $29,809 (±$1,006). Approximately, 15.5% of families and 19.2% of the population were below the poverty line, including 27.6% of those under the age of 18 and 9.6% of those ages 65 or over.

=== 2010 census ===
According to the 2010 census, there were 145,786 people, 53,925 households, and 35,112 families residing in the city. The population density was 1,168.1 inhabitants per square mile (451.0/km^{2}). There were 61,969 housing units at an average density of 496.5 per square mile (191.7/km^{2}). The median age in the city was 32.5 years. 28.4% of residents were under the age of 18; 9.7% were between the ages of 18 and 24; 27.7% were from 25 to 44; 23.7% were from 45 to 64; and 10.5% were 65 years of age or older. The gender makeup of the city was 49.4% male and 50.6% female.

There were 53,925 households, of which 37.0% had children under the age of 18 living with them, 39.1% were married couples living together, 18.9% had a female householder with no husband present, 7.0% had a male householder with no wife present, and 34.9% were non-families. 28.8% of all households were made up of individuals, and 8.9% had someone living alone who was 65 years of age or older. The average household size was 2.68 and the average family size was 3.32.

The racial composition of Kansas City, Kansas, as of 2010, was as follows:

- White: 52.2%
- Black or African American: 26.8%
- Native American: 0.8%
- Asian: 2.7%
- Pacific Islander: 0.1%
- Other races: 13.6%
- Two or more races: 3.8%
- Hispanic or Latino (of any race): 27.8%
- Non-Hispanic Whites: 40.2%

== Economy ==
Bureau of Labor Statistics data shows that employment in Wyandotte County, Kansas, increased 4% from March 2011 to March 2012. The sharp rise in the number of workers resulted in Wyandotte County ranking 19th in the nation and 1st in the Kansas City metropolitan area for job growth as of September 28, 2012.

Kansas City is the home to the General Motors Fairfax Assembly Plant, which manufactures the Chevrolet Malibu and the Cadillac XT4. The Federal Bureau of Prisons maintains its North Central Region Office in the city. In addition, Associated Wholesale Grocers and Kansas City Steak Company are based within the city. The largest employer is the University of Kansas Hospital. The adjoining University of Kansas Medical Center, including the schools of medicine, nursing, and allied health, is also among the city's largest employers (with a student population of about 3,000).

Village West is a business and entertainment district located at the intersection of Interstates 70 and 435. Anchored by the Kansas Speedway, tenants include Hollywood Casino, The Legends At Village West, AMC Theatres IMAX, Cabela's, Nebraska Furniture Mart, Great Wolf Lodge, Monarchs Stadium, the home stadium of the Kansas City Monarchs of the American Association of Professional Baseball, over three dozen restaurants, and Sporting Park, the home stadium of the Sporting Kansas City Major League Soccer franchise. Schlitterbahn Vacation Village, a 370-acre (1.5 km^{2}) resort and waterpark, opened across I-435 from Village West in June 2009; however, it has been closed since the end of the 2018 season.

On March 30, 2011, Google announced that Kansas City had been selected as the site of an experimental fiber-optic network that it would build at no cost to the city. Kansas City was chosen from a field of 1,100 U.S. communities that had applied for the network. The network became operational in 2012. Piper, Kansas, became the first full community in the nation (based on actual residential votes and pre-registration counts) to have residential broadband internet network infrastructures using fiber-optic communication of 1 Gbit/s download and upload speeds provided by Google Fiber.

=== Largest employers ===
According to the city's 2026 Annual Comprehensive Financial Report, published on 30 June 2026 the largest employers in the city are:

#	Employer	# of employees
1	University of Kansas Health System	8,500+
2	University of Kansas Medical Center	5,400–5,499
3	Amazon Fullfillment Centers	4,000–4,499
4	Kansas City, Kansas Public Schools	3,000–3,499
5	UPS	2,500–2,999
6	Unified Government of Wyandotte County and Kansas City, KS	2,000–2,499
7	BNSF Railway	2,000–2,499
8	Urban Outfitters	1,000–1,499
9	General Motors	1,000–1,499
10	Providence Medical Center	1,000–1,499

== Government ==
=== City government ===
Kansas City, Kansas, has a consolidated city-county government in which the city and county have been merged into one jurisdiction. As such, it is simultaneously a city, which is a municipal corporation, and a county, which is an administrative division of a state. The Kansas Legislature passed enabling legislation in 1997, and voters approved the consolidation proposal the same year.

The Kansas City, Kansas Police Department was founded in 1898. By 1918, the department had begun taking photographs and fingerprints of all the people its officers had arrested.

The Kansas City, Kansas Fire Department was founded on December 25, 1883. The fire department is part of the Firefighter's Relief Association and the International Association of Fire Fighters. IAFF Local 64 is a charter member and was organized on February 28, 1918. The department has 18 fire stations in the city and covers an area of approximately 127 square miles. The department also has specialty teams, including heavy rescue, hazardous materials, foam team, water rescue, tactical medic, trench rescue, high angle/rope rescue, and technical urban search and rescue. The fire department has four public service programs: a citizens assist program, fire prevention, safe place, and a smoke detector program.

Mayor/CEO

- Christal E. Watson

Board of Commissioners

- At-Large District 1: Melissa Bynum
- At-Large District 2: Andrew Kump
- District 1: Jermaine Howard
- District 2: William J. Burns
- District 3: Christian Ramirez
- District 4: Evelyn Hill
- District 5: Carlos Pacheco
- District 6: Philip J. Lopez
- District 7: Chuck Stites
- District 8: Andrew Davis

=== Law enforcement ===
Kansas City
- Crime rates* (2012)

Violent crimes
- Homicide: 15
- Rape: 85
- Robbery: 277
- Aggravated assault: 500
- Total violent crime: 877

Property crimes
- Burglary: 1,772
- Larceny-theft: 4,558
- Motor vehicle theft: 1,208
- Arson: 69
- Total property crime: 7,538
- Note: Reported crimes per 100,000 population Source: 2012 FBI UCR Data

The Kansas City Police Department (Kansas) performs law enforcement in the city. The department was established in 1898 with a staff of 46.

Of the statistics available in 2000 based on data collected by the Federal Bureau of Investigation (FBI) as part of its Uniform Crime Reporting Program, which represent from arrests made by State and local law enforcement agencies as reported to the FBI, there were a total of 696 incidents.

==== Golubski scandal ====
Retired KCK police detective Roger Golubski had been accused of sexual assault, protecting organized crime, and obtaining convictions on falsified evidence and coerced perjury.

Lamonte McIntire was exonerated and released in October 2017 after 23 years in prison for a double murder. His mother claimed Golubski tried to force her into a sexual relationship. When she refused, Golubski framed her son. Detectives working the case refused to collect basic evidence. Former KCK Police Chief Terry Ziegler and other supervisors knew about this.

On September 15, 2022, Golubski was indicted by a federal grand jury in Topeka, Kansas, and arrested on six counts of sexual assault under color of law. Another three-count federal indictment was unsealed November 14, almost two months later: Golubski and three other men—Cecil Brooks, LeMark Roberson, and Richard Robinson—were charged with conspiring, decades ago, to keep young women as sex slaves. At the time of this indictment, Brooks was in a federal prison in Fort Worth, Texas; the locations of the others were unavailable.

Golubski did not face trial for the federal case regarding the alleged abuse and assault of women. He failed to show up to the beginning of his trial on December 2, 2024, and was found dead at his home, the result of a self-inflicted gunshot wound.

== Education ==
=== Colleges and universities ===
Public

- Kansas City Kansas Community College
- University of Kansas Medical Center (home of KU's Schools of Medicine, Nursing and Health Professions)

Private

- Donnelly College

=== School districts ===
Public

- Kansas City USD 500
- Piper USD 203
- Turner USD 202

Private

- Catholic Archdiocese of Kansas City

=== Secondary schools ===
- Bishop Ward High School
- Fairfax Learning Center
- J. C. Harmon High School
- Kansas City Kansas Community College: Technical Education Center
- Piper High School, Kansas City in Piper
- F.L. Schlagle High School
- Kansas State School for the Blind (KSSB)
- Sumner Academy of Arts & Science
- Turner High School
- Washington High School
- Wyandotte High School in Kansas City

=== Public libraries ===
The Kansas City, Kansas Public Library system has five branch libraries spread throughout Wyandotte County: the Main Library, South Branch Library, Turner Community Library, West Wyandotte Library, and the Mr. & Mrs. F.L. Schlagle Environmental Library in Wyandotte County Lake Park. The system was formed in 1895. In 1899, it came under the authority of the Kansas City, Kansas Public School District Board of Education.

== Transportation ==
River transportation was important to early Kansas City, Kansas, as its location at the confluence of the Missouri and Kansas Rivers afforded easy access to trade. Kansas City Area Transportation Authority provides transportation for 60k riders daily. A portion of I-70 was the first project in the United States completed under the provisions of the new Federal-Aid Highway Act of 1956 (though not the first constructed or to begin construction).

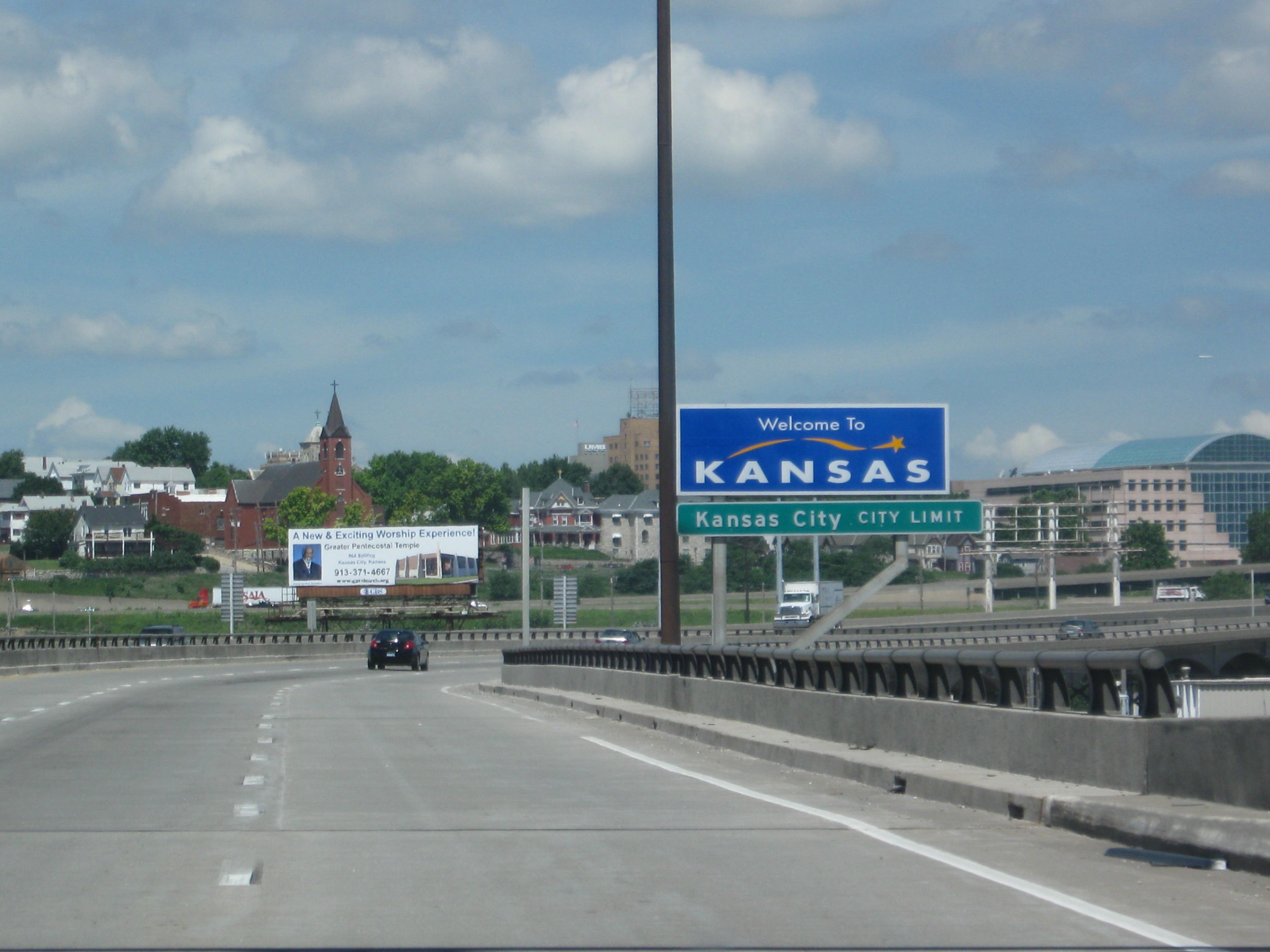
Interstate 70 as it enters Kansas, crossing the Kansas River (2010)

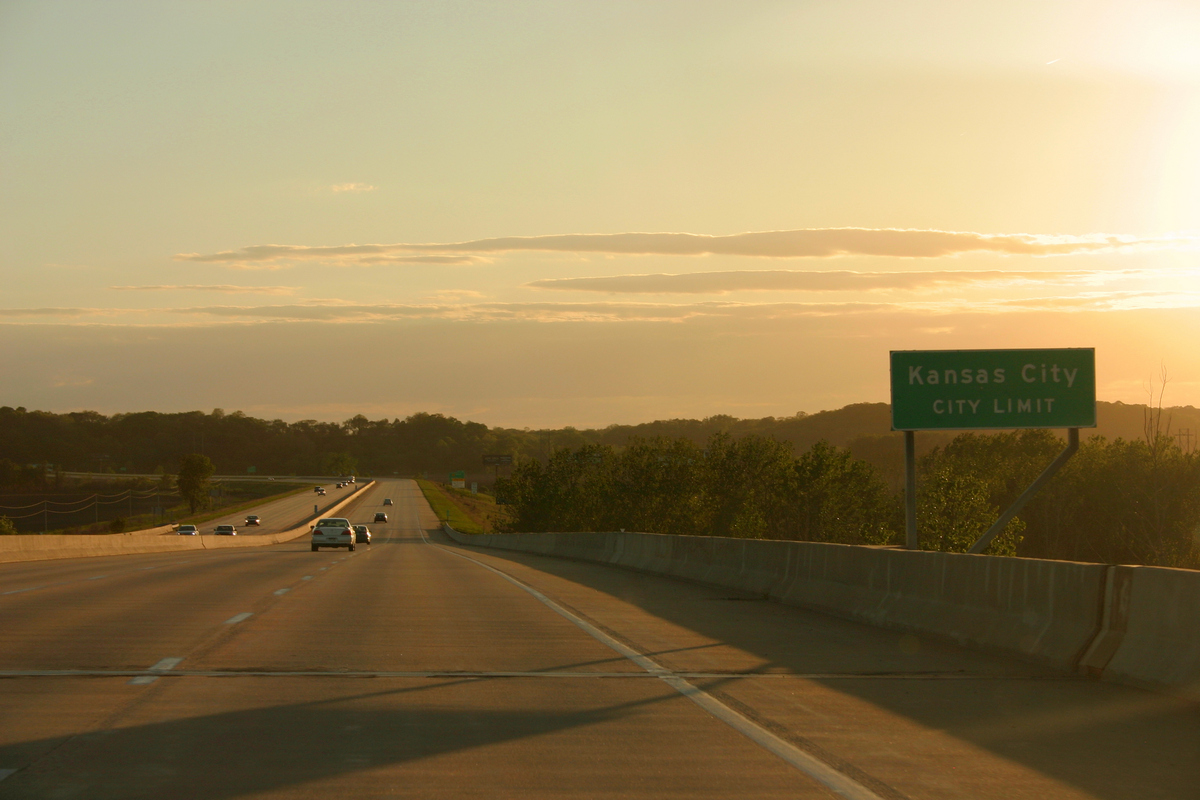
City limits of Kansas City, Kansas

=== Major highways ===
- I-35 – To Des Moines, Iowa, to the north and Wichita, Kansas, to the south.
- I-70 – To St. Louis, Missouri, to the east and Topeka, Kansas/Denver, Colorado, to the west.
- I-435 – A bi-state loop through the Missouri and Kansas suburbs, providing access to Kansas City International Airport
- I-635 – Connects the Kansas suburbs with Kansas City, Kansas, and Riverside, Missouri, just north of Kansas City, Missouri
- I-670 – A southern bypass of I-70 and Southern portion of the downtown loop. Signed as East I-70 when exiting from I-35 while traveling north
- US-24 / US-40 – Combination of the US-24 and US-40 highways that pass through Kansas City
- K-5 – A minor freeway bypassing the north of Kansas City, Kansas, connecting the GM Fairfax plant with I-635. K-5 continues as Leavenworth Road west to I-435 then on to Leavenworth, Kansas
- K-7 – A freeway linking Leavenworth County, Kansas; Wyandotte County, Kansas; and Johnson County, Kansas
- K-32 – A highway that links Leavenworth County, Kansas, Wyandotte County, and Douglas County, Kansas
- US-169, 7th Street Trafficway
- South 18th Street Expressway
- State Avenue and Parallel Parkway
- Kansas Avenue and the Turner Diagonal

=== Airports ===
The nearest airport is Kansas City International Airport.

=== Rail ===
Passenger rail service is provided by Amtrak at the nearby Kansas City Union Station via the Southwest Chief and Missouri River Runner.

=== Bus ===
- RideKC - The local transit provider
- Greyhound Lines - Intercity bus serving the 47th Street Transit Center

== Culture ==
Kansas City, Kansas, has a number of buildings that are listed on the National Register of Historic Places. The city is home to the Roman Catholic Archdiocese of Kansas City in Kansas, which covers 12,500 square miles (32,000 km^{2}) in eastern Kansas.

Memorial Hall is a 3,500-seat indoor arena/auditorium located in the city's downtown. The venue, which has a permanent stage, is used for public assemblies, concerts, and sporting events. In 1887, John G. Braecklein constructed a Victorian home for John and Margaret Scroggs in the area of Strawberry Hill. It is a fine example of the Queen Anne style architecture erected in Kansas City, Kansas.

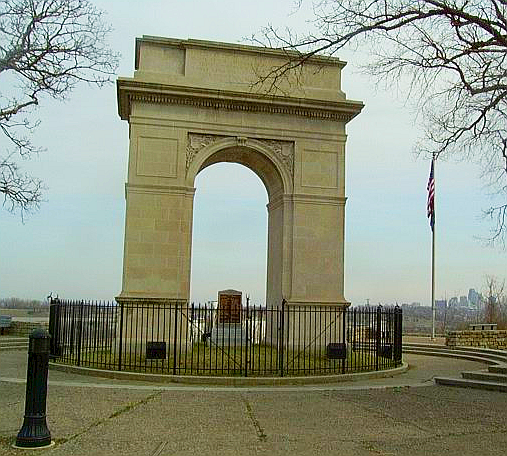
Rosedale Arch, a replica of the Arc de Triomphe, at the top of Memorial Drive (39°3′49.8″N 94°36′54.2″W).

The Rosedale Arch, dedicated to the men of Kansas City, Kansas, who served in World War I, is a small-scale replica of France's famous Arc de Triomphe. It is located on Mount Marty in Rosedale, overlooking the intersection of Rainbow and Southwest Boulevards.

Wyandotte High School is a public school building located at 2501 Minnesota Avenue. Built in 1936 as a Works Progress Administration project, the school was later designated as a Historical Landmark by the city in 1985 and placed on the National Register of Historic Places on April 30, 1986. In 1889, the Wyandotte County Museum and Historical Society was established as a permanent repository of the county's history. The Argentine Carnegie Library, the only Carnegie library that exists in the metropolitan area, was built in 1917. The library has moved the collections and staff from Argentine to the new South Branch, at 3104 Strong Ave., a few blocks to the west and north, which opened September 26, 2012. The library has turned over the building to the Kansas City, Kansas, US$500.

Other points of interest in the Kansas City, Kansas, area include Fire Station No. 9, Granada Theater, Hanover Heights Neighborhood Historic District, Huron Cemetery, Judge Louis Gates House, Kansas City, Kansas Hall, Kansas City, Kansas Fire Headquarters, Great Wolf Lodge, Schlitterbahn Vacation Village, Quindaro Townsite, Sauer Castle, Scottish Rite Temple, Shawnee Street Overpass, Soldiers and Sailors Memorial Building, St. Augustine Hall, Theodore Shafer House, Trowbridge Archeological Site, Westheight Manor and Westheight Manor District, White Church Christian Church, Wyandotte County Courthouse and the Muncie area.

=== Media ===
Kansas City, Kansas, is part of a bi-state media market that comprises 32 counties in northeastern Kansas and northwestern Missouri. The Kansas City media market (ranked 32nd by Arbitron and 31st by Nielsen) includes 10 television stations and 30 FM and 21 AM radio stations. Due to its close proximity to the Topeka media market, most of the television and radio stations from that city are receivable over-the-air in portions of the Kansas City, Kansas, area. KCTV, the market's CBS affiliate, is licensed to Kansas City, Missouri, but operates out of Kansas City, Kansas.

==== Newspapers ====
Kansas City, Kansas, is served by the Kansan, a daily newspaper which ceased its print publication and became an online-only paper in 2009. Newspapers serving the city's suburbs include The Record (serving Turner, Argentine, and Rosedale), Piper Press (serving Piper), and The Wyandotte West (weekly publication for western Wyandotte County).

Weekly newspapers include alternative publication The Pitch, faith-oriented newspaper The Kansas City Metro Voice, The Wyandotte Echo (which focuses on legal news), The Call (which is focused on the African-American community), business newspaper Kansas City Business Journal, and the bilingual publication Dos Mundos.

==== Broadcast media ====
The major U.S. broadcast television networks have affiliates in the Kansas City market, including WDAF-TV 4 (Fox), KCTV 5 (CBS), KMBC-TV 9 (ABC), KCPT 19 (PBS), KCWE 29 (The CW), KSHB-TV 41 (NBC) and KSMO-TV 62 (MyNetworkTV). Other television stations in the market include Saint Joseph, Missouri-based KTAJ-TV 16 (TBN), KCKS-LD 25, Lawrence, Kansas-based KMCI-TV 38 (independent), Spanish-language station KUKC-LD 20 (Univision), and KPXE-TV 50 (Ion Television).

== Sports ==
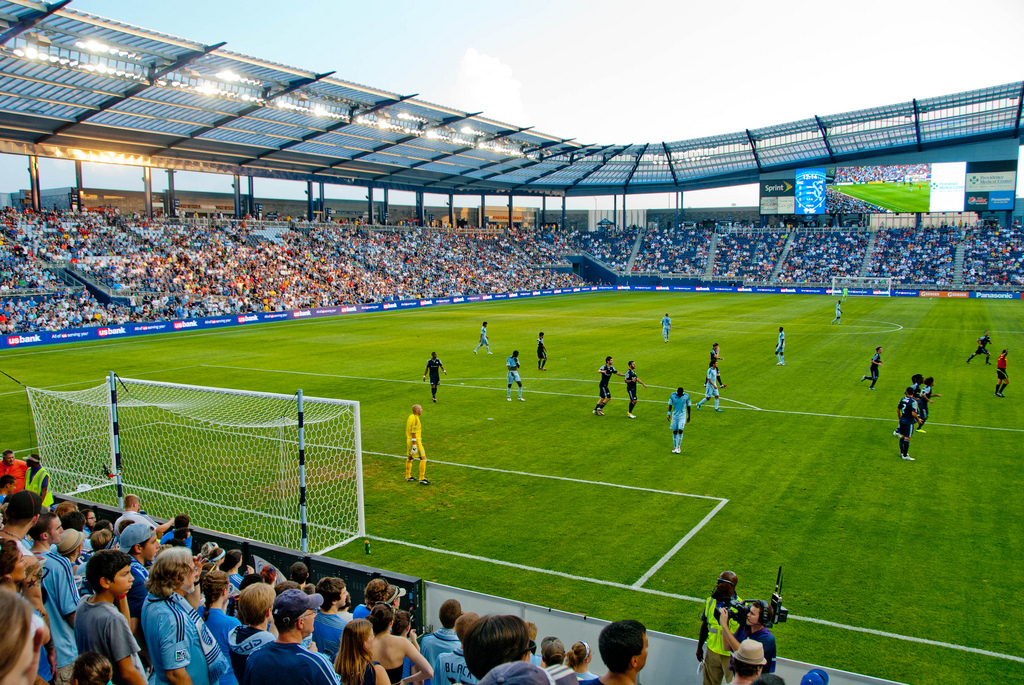
Kansas City's Sporting Park hosts Sporting Kansas City of Major League Soccer (2011)

=== Sporting Kansas City ===
The Major League Soccer franchise Sporting Kansas City (which was originally known as the Kansas City Wiz for its inaugural year in 1996 and the Kansas City Wizards from 1997 to 2010) currently plays its home games at Sporting Park in the Village West district. The team originally planned to move to Trails Stadium, a planned stadium facility in Kansas City, Missouri, in 2011, but the project was scuttled in 2009. The developer of the planned venue moved the project to the Village West area, near Legends Field, and received the needed approvals in January 2010.

=== Kansas City Current ===
The Kansas City Current replaced the now defunct National Women's Soccer League team FC Kansas City, which ceased operations in 2017. The Current played its inaugural season at Legends Field before moving for the 2022 season to Children's Mercy Park. The team's ownership committed to building a soccer specific stadium across the state line in Kansas City, Missouri, on the Berkley Riverfront Park, which broke ground on October 6, 2022, with a goal to open by March 2024.

=== Kansas City Monarchs ===
The Kansas City Monarchs is an independent baseball team in the American Association, which moved to Kansas City, Kansas, in 2003 and, through 2019, played its home games at Legends Field, located adjacent to the Village West development in western Wyandotte County. The team was previously a member of the Northern League (which was not affiliated with Major League Baseball), until it dissolved following the 2010 season. While the remaining Northern League teams became members of the North American League as part of the Northern League's merger with the Golden Baseball League and United Baseball League, the T-Bones joined many other former Northern League teams in the relatively new American Association of Independent Professional Baseball. The T-Bones won the Northern League Championship in 2008 and the American Association Championship in 2018. The Unified Government evicted it from its stadium on October 14, 2019, for nonpayment of rent and utilities.

=== Auto racing ===
The Kansas Speedway is an auto racetrack adjacent to the Village West area in western Wyandotte County. The speedway, which is used for races that are part of the NASCAR Cup Series and other racing series, is a 1.5 miles (2.4 km) tri-oval with turns which bank at a 15° angle. The track held its first race on June 2, 2001, when the Winston West Series contested the Kansas 100. The top-level NASCAR Cup Series holds the annual Hollywood Casino 400 at the track. The IndyCar Series previously ran the RoadRunner Turbo Indy 300 from 2001 to 2010, with IndyCar driver Scott Dixon setting the overall lap record for all series.
