= List of hospitals in St. Louis =

This is a list of hospitals in St. Louis, including those in St. Louis County, sorted by name. A list of hospitals in Missouri is also available.

== Hospital Systems present in Greater St. Louis ==
- BJC HealthCare
- HSHS
- Mercy
- OSF HealthCare
- SSM Health

== Hospitals in Greater St. Louis ==
- Alvin J. Siteman Cancer Center - St. Louis
- Barnes-Jewish Hospital - St. Louis, Missouri
- Barnes-Jewish West County Hospital - Creve Coeur, Missouri
- Christian Hospital - St. Louis
- St. Luke's Des Peres Hospital - Des Peres, Missouri
- Kindred Hospital - St. Louis - St. Louis
- Mercy Hospital St. Louis - Creve Coeur, Missouri
- Mercy Hospital South - Unincorporated South St. Louis County, Missouri (Tesson Ferry Township)
- Mercy Rehabilitation Hospital - Chesterfield, Missouri
- Metropolitan Saint Louis Psychiatric Center - St. Louis
- Missouri Baptist Medical Center - Town and Country, Missouri
- Ranken Jordan Pediatric Specialty Hospital - Maryland Heights, Missouri
- The Rehabilitation Institute of St. Louis - St. Louis
- St. Louis Behavioral Medicine Institute - St. Louis
- St. Louis Children's Hospital - St. Louis, Missouri
- Saint Louis University Hospital - St. Louis
- St. Louis VA Medical Center - St. Louis
- St. Luke's Hospital - Chesterfield, Missouri
- Select Specialty Hospital - St. Louis
- Shriners Hospitals for Children - St. Louis
- SSM Health Cardinal Glennon Children's Hospital - St. Louis, Missouri
- SSM Health DePaul Hospital - Bridgeton, Missouri
- SSM Health St. Clare Hospital - Unincorporated South St. Louis County, Missouri (Queeny Township)
- SSM Health St. Mary's Hospital - Richmond Heights, Missouri

== University Medical Centers in Greater St. Louis ==
- Saint Louis University Medical Center - St. Louis
- Washington University Medical Center - St. Louis
