= List of hospitals in Missouri =

This is a list of hospitals in Missouri.

Hospital	County	City	Bed count	Founded	Notes
Alvin J. Siteman Cancer Center		St. Louis			
Audrain Medical Center	Audrain	Mexico			
Barnes-Jewish Hospital		St. Louis			
Barnes-Jewish Saint Peters Hospital		St. Peters			
Barnes–Jewish West County Hospital	St. Louis	Creve Coeur	108		Formerly Faith Hospital
Barton County Memorial Hospital	Barton	Lamar			
Bates County Memorial Hospital	Bates	Butler			
Boone Hospital Center	Boone	Columbia			
Bothwell Regional Health Center		Sedalia			
Cameron Regional Medical Center		Cameron			
Capital Region Medical Center	Cole	Jefferson City			
Cardinal Glennon Children's Hospital		St. Louis	195	1956	
Carondelet Health	Jackson	Blue Springs			
Carondelet Health		Kansas City			
Cass Medical Center	Cass	Harrisonville			
Cedar County Memorial Hospital	Cedar	El Dorado Springs			
Centerpoint Medical Center		Independence			
CenterPointe Hospital	St. Charles	St. Charles			
Children's Mercy Hospital		Kansas City			
Children's Mercy Northland		Kansas City			
Christian Hospital	St. Louis	Florissant			
Christian Hospital		St. Louis			
Citizens Memorial Healthcare	Polk	Bolivar			
Columbia Regional Hospital	Boone	Columbia			
Cooper County Memorial Hospital	Cooper	Boonville			
Cox Branson		Branson			
Cox Monett		Monett			
Cox North	Greene	Springfield			
Cox South	Greene	Springfield			
Cox Walnut Lawn	Greene	Springfield			
CoxHealth	Greene	Springfield			
Crittenton Behavioral Health		Kansas City			
Crossroads Regional Medical Center		Wentzville			
Deaconess Incarnate Word Health System		St. Louis			
Doctors Hospital of Springfield	Greene	Springfield			
Eastern Missouri State Hospital	St. Louis	Florissant			
Ellett Memorial Hospital		Appleton City			
Ellis Fischel Cancer Center	Boone	Columbia			
Excelsior Springs Medical Center		Excelsior Springs			
Fairfax Community Hospital	Atchison	Fairfax			
Fitzgibbon Hospital		Marshall			
Freeman Cancer Institute		Joplin			
Freeman Health System		Joplin			
Freeman Heart Institute		Joplin			
Freeman Neosho Hospital		Neosho			
Freeman Orthopaedics & Sports Medicine		Joplin			
Fulton Medical Center		Fulton			
Fulton State Hospital		Fulton			
General Leonard Wood Army Community Hospital		Fort Leonard Wood			
Golden Valley Memorial Hospital		Clinton			
Hannibal Regional Hospital	Marion	Hannibal			
Harry S. Truman Memorial Veterans' Hospital	Boone	Columbia			
Hawthorn Children's Psychiatric Hospital		St. Louis			
HCA Midwest Division		Kansas City			
Heartland Behavioral Health Services	Vernon	Nevada			
Mosaic Life Car at St. Joseph	Buchanan	St. Joseph	352	1924	
Hedrick Medical Center		Chillicothe			
Hermann Area District Hospital		Hermann			
I-70 Community Hospital		Sweet Springs			
Memorial Hospital Jefferson	Jefferson	Festus			
John J. Cochran Veterans Hospital		St. Louis	355	1952	
John J. Pershing VA Medical Center		Poplar Bluff			
Kansas City VA Medical Center		Kansas City			
Kindred Hospital		Kansas City			
Kindred Hospital		St. Louis			
Lafayette Regional Health Center		Lexington			
Lake Regional Health System		Osage Beach			
Lakeland Regional Hospital	Greene	Springfield			
Lee's Summit Hospital		Lee's Summit			
Liberty Hospital		Liberty			
Madison Medical Center		Fredericktown			
Mercy McCune-Brooks Hospital		Carthage			Formerly known as McCune-Brooks Regional Hospital
Mercy Hospital Joplin		Joplin			Formerly St. John's Regional Medical Center
Mercy Hospital St. John's	Lawrence	Aurora			Formerly Aurora Hospital
Mercy hospital Springfield		Springfield			
Mercy Hospital St. Louis		Creve Coeur			
Mercy Hospital South		Sappington			Formerly St. Anthony's Medical Center
Mercy Hospital Washington		Washington			
Metropolitan Saint Louis Psychiatric Center		St. Louis			
Mid Missouri Mental Health Center	Boone	Columbia			
Mineral Area Regional Medical Center		Farmington			
Missouri Baptist Hospital-Sullivan		Sullivan			
Missouri Baptist Medical Center		Town and Country			
Missouri Delta Medical Center		Sikeston			
Missouri Rehabilitation Center		Mount Vernon			
Missouri Southern Healthcare		Sikeston			
Moberly Regional Medical Center		Moberly			
Nevada Regional Medical Center	Vernon	Nevada			
North Kansas City Hospital		North Kansas City			
Northeast Missouri Rural Health Network (NMRHN)		Kirksville			
Northeast Regional Medical Center		Kirksville			
Northwest Medical Center	Gentry	Albany			
Ozarks Community Hospital	Greene	Springfield			
Ozarks Medical Center		West Plains			
Parkland Health Center		Bonne Terre			
Parkland Health Center		Farmington			
Pemiscot Memorial Health Systems		Hayti			
Perry County Memorial Hospital		Perryville			
Pershing Memorial Hospital		Brookfield			
Phelps Health		Rolla			Formerly Phelps County Regional Medical Center
Pike County Memorial Hospital		Louisiana		1927	
Progress West Hospital		O'Fallon			
Putnam County Memorial Hospital		Unionville			
Ranken Jordan Pediatric Bridge Hospital	St. Louis	Maryland Heights			
Ray County Memorial Hospital		Richmond			
The Rehabilitation Institute		Kansas City			
The Rehabilitation Institute of St. Louis		St. Louis			
Research Belton Hospital		Belton			
Research Medical Center		Kansas City			
Research Medical Center-Brookside Campus		Kansas City			
Research Psychiatric Center		Kansas City			
Reynolds County General Memorial Hospital	Reynolds	Ellington			
Ripley County Memorial Hospital	Ripley	Doniphan			
Rusk Rehabilitation Center	Boone	Columbia			
Sac-Osage Hospital		Osceola			
Saint Alexius Hospital		St. Louis			
Mosaic Medical Center	Nodaway	Maryville			Formerly Saint Francis Hospital
Saint Francis Medical Center		Cape Girardeau			
Ste. Genevieve County Memorial Hospital	Ste. Genevieve	Ste. Genevieve			
Saint John's Aurora Community Hospital	Lawrence	Aurora			
Saint John's Breech Regional Medical Center		Lebanon			
Saint John's Health System	Greene	Springfield			
Saint John's Hospital		Cassville			
Saint John's Regional Health Center	Greene	Springfield			
Saint John's Saint Francis Hospital		Mountain View			
Saint Joseph Health Center		St. Charles			
Saint Joseph Hospital of Kirkwood		Kirkwood			
Saint Joseph Hospital West		Lake St. Louis			
St. Joseph Medical Center		Kansas City			
St. Louis Behavioral Medicine Institute		St. Louis			
St. Louis Children's Hospital		St. Louis			
Saint Louis University Health Science Center		St. Louis			
Saint Louis University Hospital		St. Louis			
St. Louis VA Medical Center		St. Louis			
Saint Luke's East Hospital		Lee's Summit			
Saint Luke's Health System		Kansas City			
St. Luke's Hospital		Chesterfield	493	1866	
Saint Luke's Hospital		Kansas City			
Saint Luke's North Hospital–Barry Road		Kansas City			
Saint Luke's North Hospital–Smithville		Smithville			
Saint Mary's Health Center	Cole	Jefferson City			
Saint Mary's Hospital of Blue Springs	Jackson	Blue Springs			
Salem Memorial District Hospital		Salem			
Samaritan Hospital		Macon			
Scotland County Memorial Hospital	Scotland	Memphis			
Select Specialty Hospital		St. Louis			
Shriners Hospitals for Children		St. Louis			
Southeast Missouri Community Treatment Center		Farmington			
Southeast Missouri Hospital		Cape Girardeau			
SouthPointe Hospital		St. Louis			
SSM Health DePaul Hospital	St. Louis	Bridgeton		1828	
SSM Health Care		St. Louis			
SSM Rehab		St. Louis			
SSM Saint Mary's Health Center		Richmond Heights			
Sullivan County Memorial Hospital		Milan			
Tenet St. Louis		St. Louis			
Texas County Memorial Hospital		Houston			
Three Rivers Healthcare		Poplar Bluff			
University Health Truman Medical Center		Kansas City			
University Health Lakewood Medical Center		Kansas City			
United States Medical Center for Federal Prisoners	Greene	Springfield		1933	
University of Missouri Hospital	Boone	Columbia			
University of Missouri Women's and Children's Hospital	Boone	Columbia			
University of Missouri Children's Hospital	Boone	Columbia			
University of Missouri Health Care	Boone	Columbia			
Washington County Memorial Hospital		Potosi			
Washington University Medical Campus		St. Louis		1962	
Western Missouri Medical Center		Warrensburg			
Western Missouri Mental Health Center		Kansas City			
Wright Memorial Hospital		Trenton			

== Defunct hospitals ==
Hospital	County	City	Bed count	Founded	Notes
Buchanan County Infirmary	Buchanan	St. Joseph		1919	
Firmin Desloge Hospital		St. Louis	206	1932	Closed in 2020.
George Dimmitt Memorial Hospital	Polk	Humansville		1929	
Homer G. Phillips Hospital		St. Louis	177	1937	Closed in 1979. Currently used as senior living apartments.
O'Reilly General Hospital	Greene	Springfield	3,426	1941	Closed in 1952.
Nevada State Hospital	Vernon	Nevada		1937	
St. Alexius Hospital		St. Louis	178	1869	Closed in 2023.
St. Elizabeth Hospital		Hannibal		1915	
St. Vincent's Hospital		Normandy		1858	
Two Rivers Psychiatric Hospital		Kansas City	105	1986	Closed in 2019.
