= Mineral Area Regional Medical Center =

- Capella Healthcare

Geography
- Location: Farmington, Missouri, United States
- Coordinates: 37°48′01″N 90°26′24″W

Organization
- Type: Specialist

Services
- Beds: 98
- Speciality: Osteopathy

History
- Opened: 1952

Links
- Website: www.mineralarearegional.com
- Lists: Hospitals in Missouri

Mineral Area Regional Medical Center was a 98-bed osteopathic hospital located in Farmington, Missouri. An affiliate of Capella Healthcare, Mineral Area Regional Medical Center is accredited by the American Osteopathic Association's Healthcare Facilities Accreditation Program.

Founded in 1952 by a group of seven area physicians as a not-for-profit, community hospital, it was sold in 2006 to Community Health Systems, a for-profit company. In 2008, Community Health sold the facility to Capella. On May 1, 2015 BJC HealthCare, owner of Farmington's other hospital, Parkland Health Center, took ownership of Mineral Area Hospital. BJC soon renamed the hospital to 'Parkland Health Center - Weber Road' (Parkland's original location became 'Parkland Health Center - Liberty Road') after they assumed ownership. After only nine months of ownership, BJC closed the former Mineral Area Regional Medical Center on January 19, 2016, consolidating operations into Parkland's Liberty Road campus.

== Mineral Area School of Radiologic Technology ==
Mineral Area Regional Medical Center was home to the Mineral Area School of Radiologic Technology from 1983 to 2009. The School was founded at the hospital in 1983 and began its affiliation with Mineral Area College in 1996. As of July 2009, the School moved to the Mineral Area College campus in Park Hills, Missouri.
