= Sisters of Charity Hospital =

Sisters of Charity Hospital can refer to:

- Sisters of Charity Hospital (Zagreb) in Croatia
- Sisters of Charity Hospital (Buffalo) in the United States
- The Hospital of the Sisters of Charity, the original name of SSM Health DePaul Hospital in the United States
