= Mercy Hospital South =

- Mercy
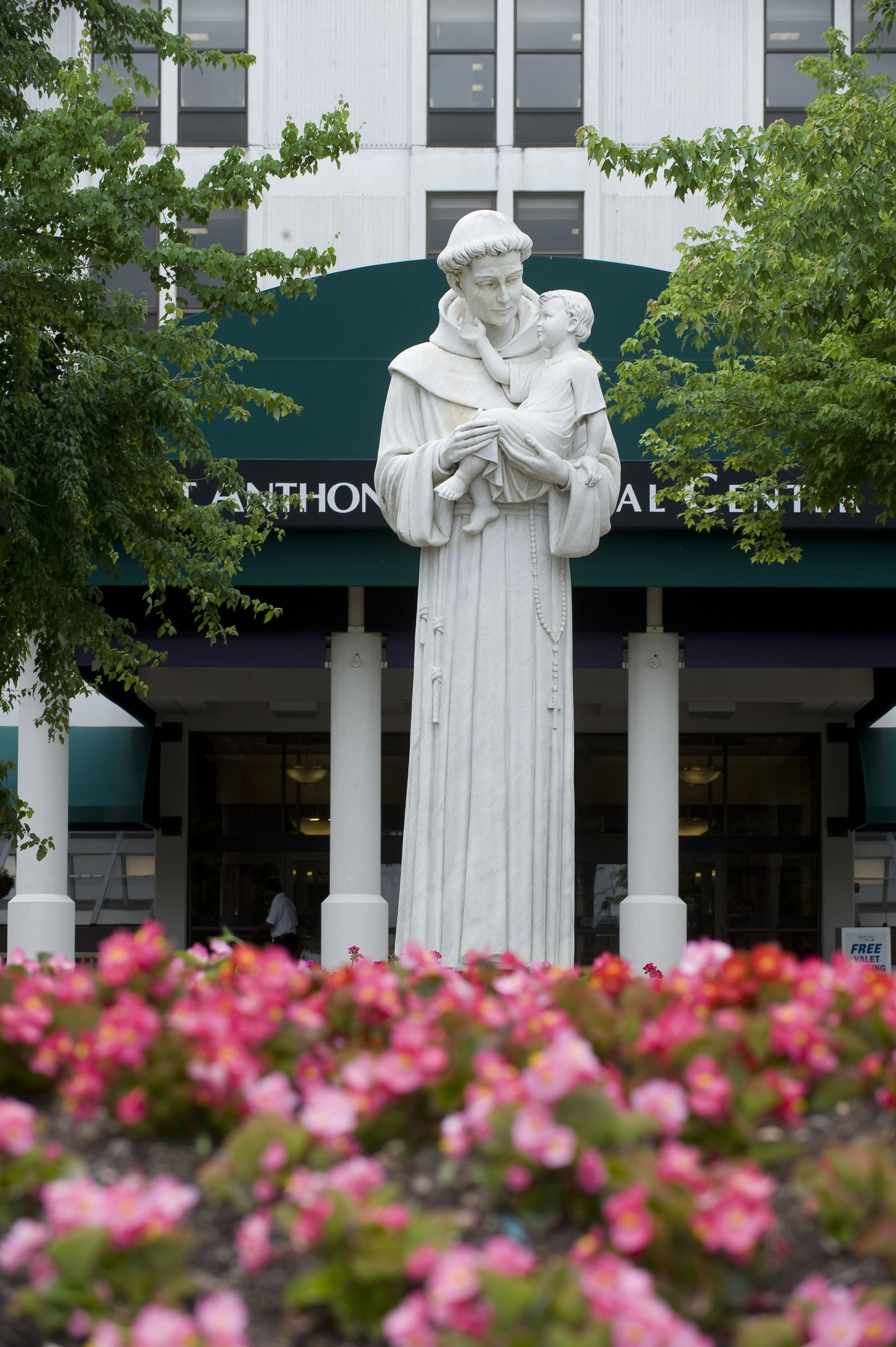
- A statue of St. Anthony of Padua at the hospital's entrance

Geography
- Location: 10010 Kennerly Road, Sappington, Missouri 63128, Missouri, United States
- Coordinates: 38°30′25″N 90°22′49″W

Organization
- Type: Community
- Network: Mercy

Services
- Emergency department: Level II Trauma certification
- Beds: 767

History
- Founded: 1900

Links
- Website: www.mercy.net
- Lists: Hospitals in Missouri

Mercy Hospital South, formerly St. Anthony's Medical Center, is the third-largest medical center in Greater St. Louis and an affiliate of Mercy. It earned Joint Commission advanced certification as a Comprehensive Stroke Center, is the busiest stroke center in Missouri, and is the only designated Level II Trauma Center in either South St. Louis County or Jefferson County. The hospital is located in unincorporated Sappington, Missouri, just south of I-270 along Tesson Ferry Road (Missouri Route 21).

It serves families in St. Louis County, St. Louis City, and Jefferson County, as well as Franklin County, St. Francois County, Ste. Genevieve County, and Washington County in Missouri, along with Monroe County, Randolph County and St. Clair County in Illinois. Mercy Hospital South has 767 licensed beds and about 500 staffed beds.

== History ==
In 1900, the Franciscan Sisters, Daughters of the Sacred Hearts of Jesus and Mary, based in Wheaton, Illinois, opened St. Anthony's Hospital at Grand and Chippewa in south St. Louis City. The facility was named after Anthony of Padua, an early disciple of Francis of Assisi, who patterned his life and healing ministry after the example set by Jesus Christ.

Following St. Louis' first polio epidemic in 1946, St. Anthony's Hospital was designated by the National Foundation for Infantile Paralysis (NFIP) as its Midwest Center for polio treatment. In 1947, convalescent children who had survived polio under the auspices of the NFIP—later known as the March of Dimes—and its city and county chapters were brought to this hospital. It became one of the country's largest polio rehabilitation centers, treating more than 100 polio patients per day. In 1954, the incidence of new cases of polio tapered off and the hospital began offering twice-yearly Salk polio vaccine clinics.

In 1967, the Franciscan Sisters transferred ownership and control of the hospital to a board of community leaders, making St. Anthony's the first Catholic hospital in the St. Louis area to be administered by a lay board. In 1975, St. Anthony's Medical Center opened at its present location at 10010 Kennerly Road. In 2017, St. Anthony's joined Mercy, which operates across four states and includes Mercy Hospital St. Louis. St. Anthony's officially changed names to Mercy Hospital South on October 1, 2018 to match the Mercy branding.

== Mercy Hospice - St. Louis de Greeff Hospice House ==
Mercy Hospice - St. Louis de Greeff Hospice House, commonly called the de Greeff Hospice House, provides traditional hospice care to terminally ill individuals who do not have a caregiver available to care for them at home. It is located on the campus of Mercy Hospital South. Patients requiring de Greeff Hospice House services may have a caregiver who is unable to care for them any longer, symptoms that cannot be managed at home or no caregiver or resources to hire outside help.

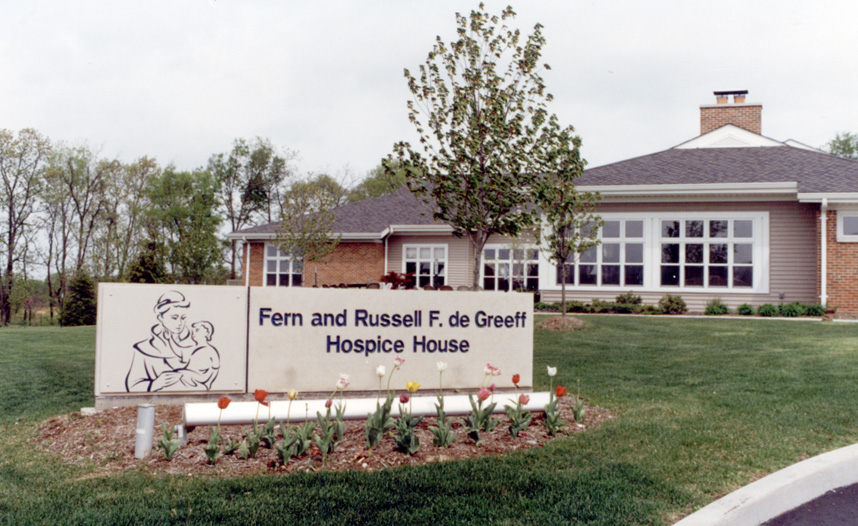
de Greeff Hospice House at Mercy Hospital South.

=== History ===
In 1998, Russell de Greeff was diagnosed with terminal cancer and was admitted to St. Anthony's Medical Center. He and his wife, Fern, saw a need and established an endowment for a freestanding hospice house to care for terminally ill individuals who had no one to care for them in their homes. Russell de Greeff died in June 1998, one year before the hospice house opened in 1999.

In 2006, the Hospice House expanded to care for 18 patients from the original 10 patients. Fern de Greeff died at age 100 in January 2010. Her name is now synonymous with generosity and hospice care in St. Louis.

== Awards and recognition ==
- In 2011, St. Anthony's Medical Center earned the highest level of accreditation available as a Chest Pain Center with PCI (Percutaneous Coronary Intervention) from the Society of Chest Pain Centers.
- In 2007, St. Anthony's was recognized for patient safety by an independent health ranking firm.
- In 2006, St. Anthony's Medical Center was recognized with a Missouri Team Quality Award.
