= MoBap =

MoBap may refer to:

- Missouri Baptist University, an educational institution in St. Louis, Missouri
- Missouri Baptist Medical Center, a hospital in St. Louis
