= John J. Cochran Veterans Hospital =

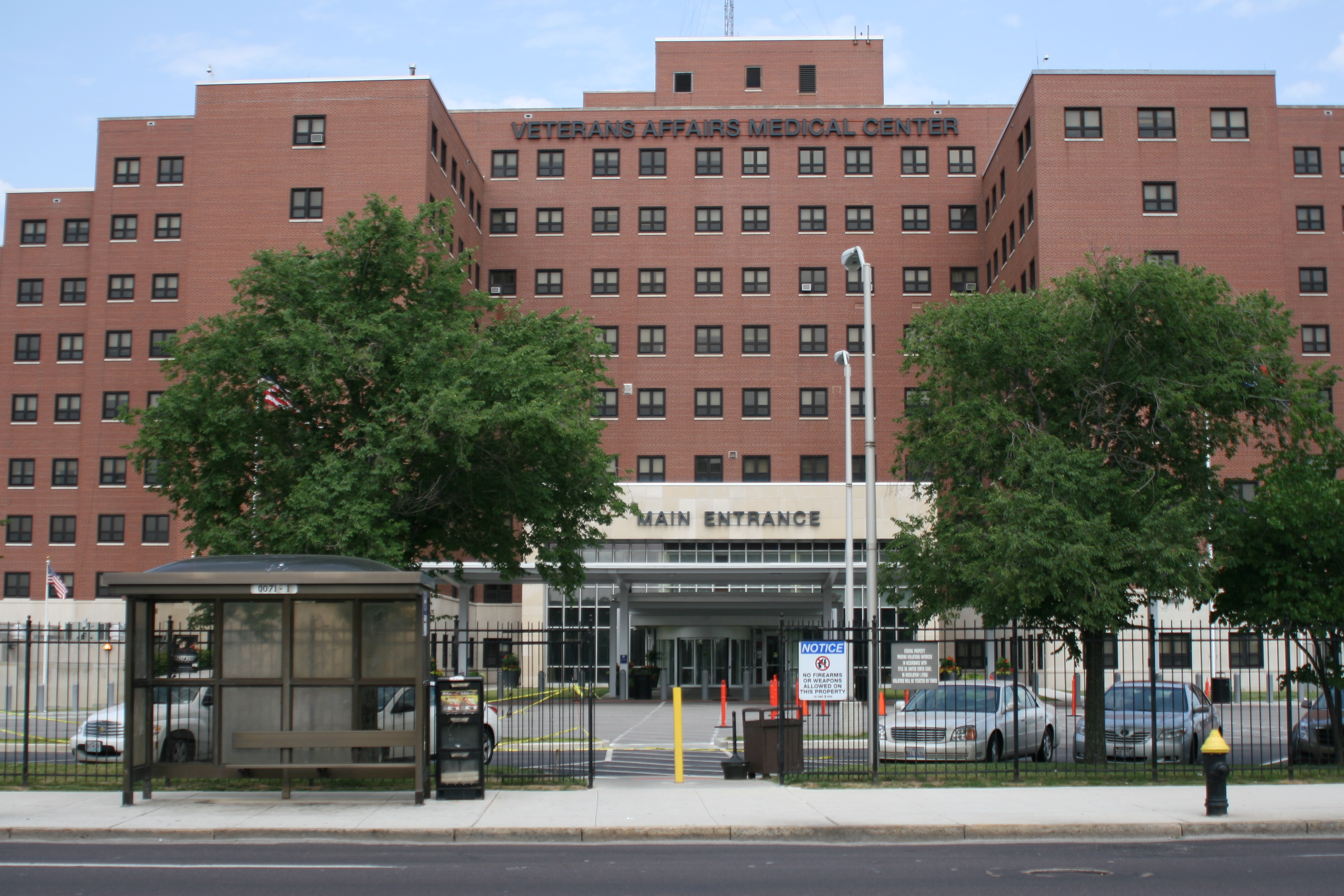

Geography
- Location: 915 North Grand Boulevard, St. Louis, Missouri, United States
- Coordinates: 38.643°N 90.231°W

Organization
- Network: VA St Louis Healthcare System

Services
- Beds: 355

History
- Opened: 1952

Links
- Website: www.va.gov/st-louis-health-care/locations/john-j-cochran-veterans-hospital/
- Lists: Hospitals in Missouri

John J. Cochran Veterans Hospital is a 355-bed hospital located in St. Louis, Missouri. It is one of two divisions of the VA St. Louis Health Care System (VASTLHCS), a healthcare provider under the United States Department of Veterans Affairs (VA). The other division is St. Louis VA Medical Center-Jefferson Barracks. The facility serves nearly 72,000 veterans in the St. Louis metropolitan area and surrounding regions, delivering a wide range of medical, mental health, and rehabilitative services to eligible veterans.

== Location ==
The hospital is located at 915 North Grand Boulevard, St. Louis, Missouri. It is centrally located in the main metropolitan area of St. Louis and positioned to help the underserved population in the urban area.

== History ==
The John Cochran Division of the VA St. Louis Health Care System was named in honor of John J. Cochran, a U.S. Representative from Missouri. The hospital originally opened in 1952.

== Services provided ==
John Cochran Veterans Hospital is a full-service facility offering a variety of care services, which include:

- Primary care
- Mental health care
- Rehabilitation
- Women's health
- Spinal cord injury treatment
- Prosthetics
- Audiology and speech
- Palliative care and hospice
- Chiropractic
- Emergency care

== Affiliations ==
John J. Cochran Veterans Hospital is affiliated with Washington University School of Medicine and the St. Louis University School of Medicine. It is also affiliated with St. Louis College of Pharmacy, Southern Illinois University School of Dentistry, and University of Missouri-St. Louis School of Optometry. These affiliations support medical education, residency programs, and research partnerships, enabling the hospital to be a training ground for future healthcare professionals.

== Research ==
The hospital is actively involved in clinical research, particularly in areas related to veteran health. Over 125 active research studies are in progress. It collaborates with academic institutions to conduct research and improve healthcare delivery for veterans.

== Accreditations ==
John J. Cochran Veterans Hospital is accredited by the Joint Commission, which is a non-profit organization that accredits healthcare organizations and programs in the United States. The hospital meets national standards for healthcare quality and safety.

== Controversies ==
In recent years, John J. Cochran Veterans Hospital has faced scrutiny for issues such as extended wait times, dental equipment sterilization practices, and outdated infrastructure.

== Future plans ==
There are ongoing plans to upgrade and modernize the facilities at John J. Cochran Veterans Hospital. The overall would likely cost over $1 billion. Over the upcoming decades, there will be construction of multiple new buildings, adding 700,000 square feet of new building space, including a 142-room tower with private inpatient rooms.

== See also ==
- List of hospitals in St. Louis
