= Boone Hospital Center =

Coordinates: 38°56′57″N 92°18′56″W

- Boone Health
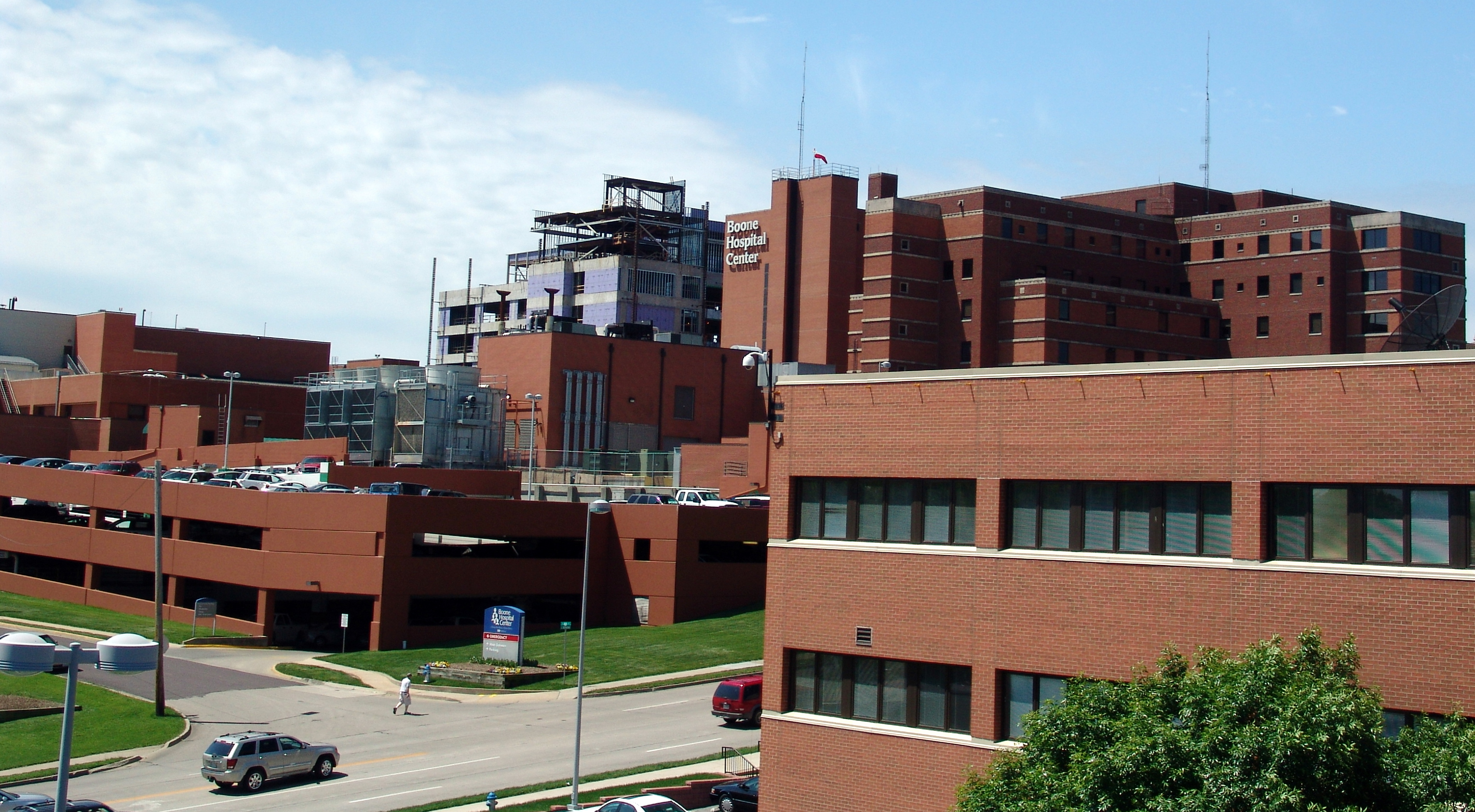

Geography
- Location: Columbia, Missouri, United States

Organization
- Care system: Tertiary
- Type: General

Services
- Emergency department: Level I stroke & STEMI center
- Beds: 394

History
- Founded: 1921

Links
- Lists: Hospitals in Missouri

Boone Hospital Center is a hospital in Columbia, Missouri. It is currently a county-owned, not-for-profit hospital administered by Boone Health. The hospital is a regional referral center, providing services to 25 Mid-Missouri counties. It employs over 2000 people, making it one of the largest employers in Columbia. As of 2026, the hospital and associated health system is currently pending sale to for-profit Ardent Health with an anticipated closing date in the first quarter of 2027.

== History ==
Built in 1921, the original Boone County Hospital was a 40-bed facility serving the citizens of Boone and surrounding counties. Due to increased demand, an addition to the facility was opened in 1954, called the Nifong Wing, after Dr. Frank Nifong, a prominent Columbia physician and fundraiser for the hospital. Voters also agreed in 1955 to fund a $3 million, 200-bed expansion that was completed in 1959. This new 6-story east wing brought the total number of patient beds to 250.

By 1962, the hospital had an average of 158 patients every day within the facility and space was becoming an issue. In 1973, a new 4-story patient care tower that added much needed space for patients as well as additional parking for visitors was completed. Its top 2 floors remained unfinished until funds were available.

In 1974, workers began $290,000 worth of remodeling in the hospital wing, updating crucial aspects of the facility infrastructure. Also completed in 1974 was a 16-bed psychiatric unit staffed by 6 specially trained nurses, which opened on the 2nd floor. This facility operated until 2008, when an economic downturn forced employee layoffs.

In 1975, Boone County Hospital made great strides in the ground-breaking field of nuclear medicine with the purchase of two pieces of supplementary equipment for its "gamma camera." Thanks to this new acquisition doctors were able to get clear images of internal organs through the use of radioisotope solution injections. Shortly thereafter, it was announced that Boone County Hospital would be one of the first facilities in the nation to acquire a whole body scanner, which represented the very latest in radiological diagnosis.

A 2-story wing was added in 1978. This housed radiology, surgery, diagnostic treatment, emergency care and obstetrics. In addition, the top 2 floors of the patient tower were completed, along with 120 new parking spaces and 2 new elevators.

In 1982, Boone Hospital Center opened a clinic in Centralia, Missouri to better serve the residents of northern Boone County.

Boone's board of trustees voted in 1988 to approve a 10-year lease agreement with Christian Health Services, thereby relinquishing county government's central role in the hospital's operation yet maintaining ownership of the plant and property. In 1993, Christian Health Services merged with Barnes and Jewish hospitals in St. Louis to form BJC HealthCare. In 2006, the board of trustees voted to continue the lease agreement with BJC Healthcare through 2015.

In 1990, the hospital's trustees purchased 24 acres (97,000 m^{2}) of land across Broadway in Stephens Park and unveiled an ambitious long-range expansion plan for the existing hospital facility as well as the 24 acres (97,000 m^{2}). The first phase of the plan remodeled the front entrance and lobby, created a new out-patient surgery waiting area, cardiac catheterization facilities and a women's health center. Medical office buildings were constructed on the property to the north of the hospital, called the Broadway Medical Plaza, and were connected to the hospital by a covered pedestrian walkway that now spanning Broadway.

In 2005, the hospital became the first facility in Mid-Missouri to receive the Magnet designation from the American Nurses Credentialing Center, and it also was honored as one of the nation's "Top 100 Hospitals" by Thomson Reuters in 2010.

The Wound Clinic at BHC received two hyperbaric chambers in 2008. Previously, the University of Missouri Hospital had the only hyperbaric chambers in mid-Missouri.

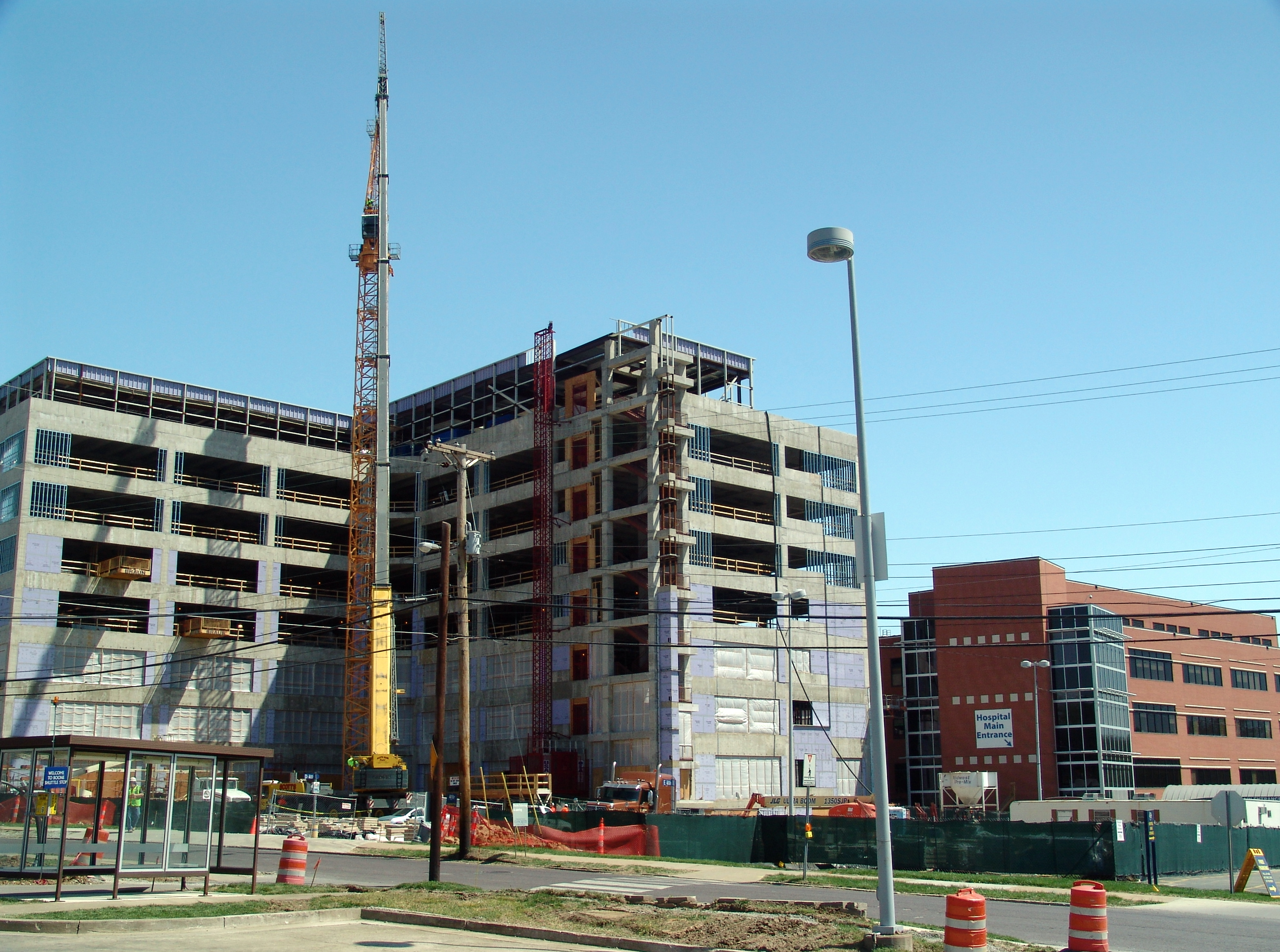
The patient care tower currently under construction

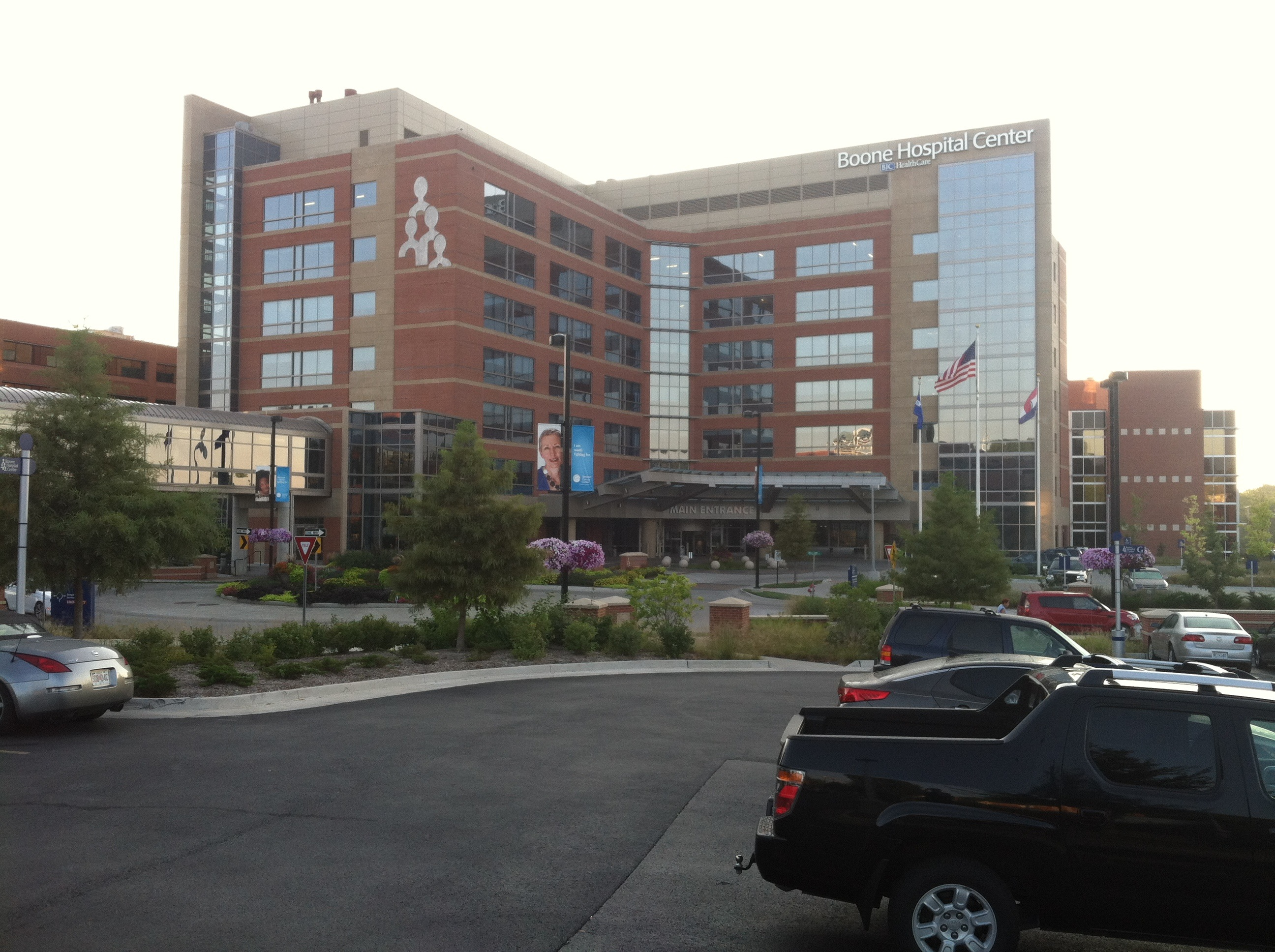
Completed construction and new main entrance

In 2009, the hospital opened the Spine Center, a specialized-care unit on the 5th floor. The 14,784-square-foot (1,373.5 m^{2}) facility features 20 private rooms, a room for physical and occupational therapy, a family/relaxation room, a redesigned nurses’ station, and a classroom for pre-operation classes. The project cost $1.8 million and was paid for with hospital operating funds.

Boone Hospital Center completed a 940-space parking garage on its west side in 2010 and broke ground on a new 7-story, 128-room patient tower. The entire project, including landscaping along William Street, will cost about $125 million. BHC funded the project by selling $100 million in municipal bonds, and the remaining $25 million will be paid for by funds designated by the hospital's board of trustees. The tower was finished in spring 2011.

In 2010, Boone Hospital Center unveiled the first "high-field" open MRI machine in Mid-Missouri. This machine can be used for patients too large to fit into a traditional closed MRI or those who suffer from claustrophobia issues.

In 2021, Boone Hospital Center separated from BJC HealthCare to become an independent organization.

In 2026, Boone Health announced an agreement to be acquired by the for-profit healthcare company Ardent Health for approximately $47 million. The acquisition includes Boone Hospital Center, Boone Health Medical Group, and 19 additional care locations and their associated real estate. The transaction is expected to be completed in the first quarter of 2027.

== Emergency services ==
Boone Hospital operates 5 ambulances in Boone County. They are located at bases in Centralia, the northeast side of Columbia (Vandiver), the north-central side of Columbia (Prathersville), the southeast side of Columbia (Lenoir Woods), and on the Boone Hospital grounds. They, along with the University of Missouri Hospital ambulance service, provide emergency care for the entire county.

== Affiliated entities ==
- Wellaware
