= Robert A. Barnes =

US businessman

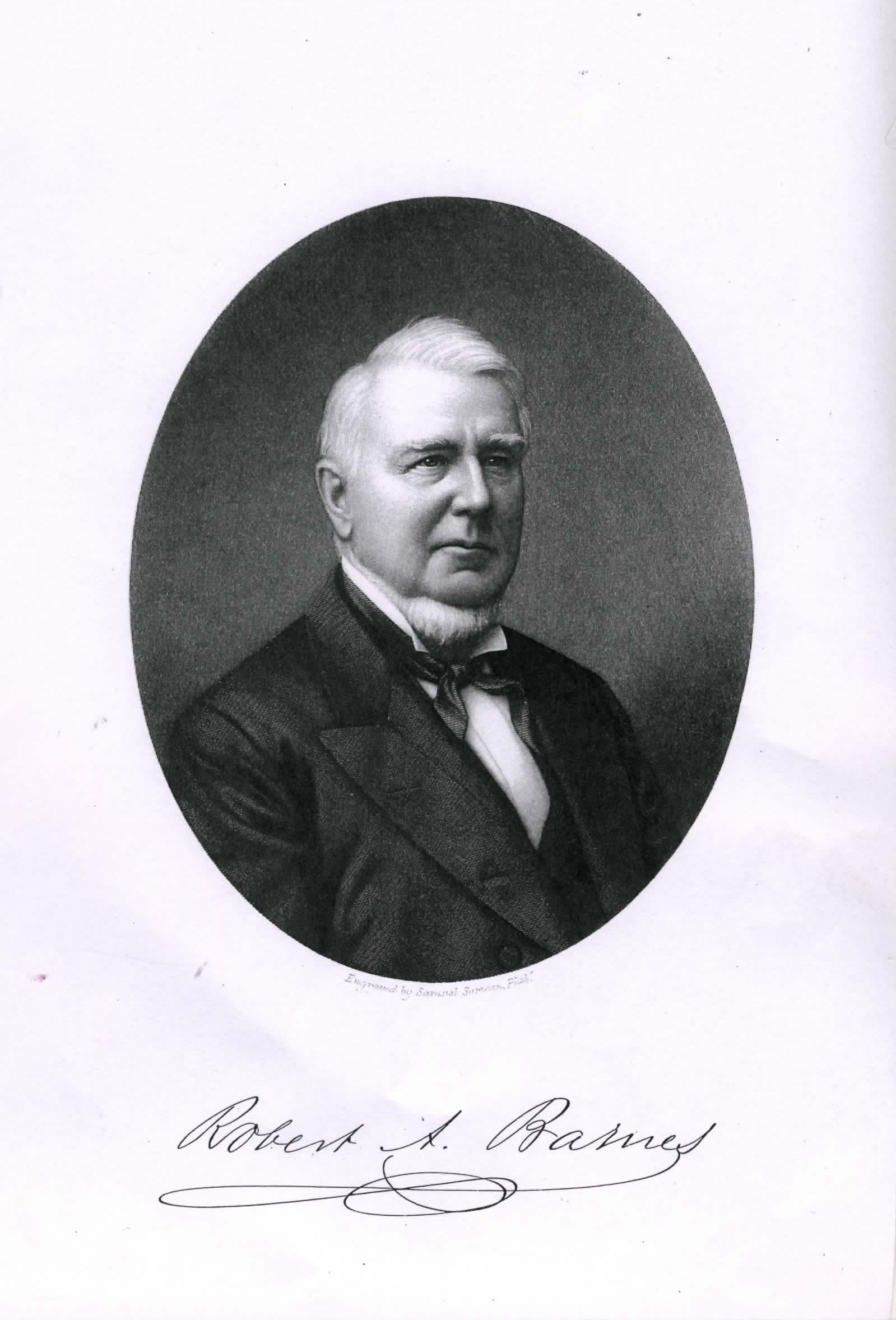
- Born: November 29, 1808; Washington, D.C., U.S.
- Died: April 2, 1892 (aged 83); St. Louis, Missouri, U.S.
- Occupations: Banker and Executive
- Spouse: Louise DeMun (m. 1845)

Robert Augustus Barnes (November 29, 1808 – April 2, 1892) was a self-made businessman in the St. Louis area. He is best known for his donation which helped found Barnes-Jewish Hospital.

== Life ==
Barnes was born in Washington, D.C., but moved to Louisville, Kentucky at the age of thirteen after the death of his father. He moved to St. Louis in 1830 and began working in a mercantile house. Soon afterwards, he began his own grocery business and held partnerships with prominent St. Louis businessmen. In 1845, he married Louise DeMun. The couple had two children together, although neither child lived past infancy.

In the early 1840s, Barnes became the president of the Bank of the State of Missouri. He stayed with the bank for 26 years while simultaneously working as an executive in other St. Louis-based companies, such as the St. Louis Railroad Company.

== Legacy ==
Robert Barnes was a philanthropist during his lifetime, but his greatest contribution came after this death. Because he had no children with whom to leave his fortune, he instead chose to leave a one million dollar bequest in his will for the foundation of a hospital. Barnes wanted to build "a modern general hospital for sick and injured persons, without distinction of creed..." His generosity, together with funds raised from the Jewish community in St. Louis, gave rise to what is now the Barnes-Jewish Hospital in St. Louis, Missouri.
