= St. Joseph Medical Center (Kansas City, Missouri) =

- Prime Healthcare

Geography
- Location: Kansas City, Missouri, United States
- Coordinates: 38°56′11″N 94°36′14″W

Organization
- Care system: Private
- Type: Community
- Religious affiliation: Catholic
- Affiliated university: California University of Science and Medicine

Services
- Emergency department: Yes
- Beds: 310

Helipads
- Helipad: FAA LID: MO21

History
- Founded: October 15, 1874

Links
- Website: www.stjosephkc.com
- Lists: Hospitals in Missouri

St. Joseph Medical Center is a 310-bed hospital in Kansas City, Missouri, US.

== History ==
At the request of local physician Dr. Jefferson Griffith and Father Bernard Donnelly, six sisters from Sisters of St. Joseph of Carondelet, led by Mother Celeste O'Reilly, arrived in Kansas City, Missouri in 1874 to establish a hospital. The sisters purchased the Waterman home, a 10-room residence at Pennsylvania Avenue and 7th Street in Quality Hill and opened Saint Joseph's Hospital on October 15, 1874. In 1917, Saint Joseph's Hospital moved to a new 250-bed facility located at 2510 East Linwood Boulevard. The hospital moved to its present-day location near I-435 and State Line Road in 1977. Prime Healthcare purchased St. Joseph Medical Center from Ascension in 2015; however, the hospital remained affiliated with the Diocese of Kansas City–Saint Joseph.

In December 2018, the hospital opened a 23-bed geriatric behavioral health unit on the fifth floor of the patient towers. As of 2026, the unit had been closed, and Prime Healthcare's geriatric psychiatry services in the area were consolidated with St. John Hospital in Leavenworth, Kansas.

In July 2025, St. Joseph Medical Center established an ACGME-accredited internal medicine residency program. The three-year categorical program, part of the Prime Healthcare South Consortium, was approved for 13 residents per postgraduate year. It is affiliated with the California University of Science and Medicine (CUSM) School of Medicine.
