= Two Rivers Psychiatric Hospital =

Defunct hospital in Missouri, U.S.

Geography
- Location: 5121 Raytown Road, Kansas City, Missouri, United States
- Coordinates: 39°01′47″N 94°28′05″W

Services
- Beds: 105

History
- Opened: 1986
- Closed: 2019

Links
- Lists: Hospitals in Missouri

Two Rivers Behavioral Health System was a 105-bed psychiatric hospital located in Kansas City, Missouri.

Opened in October 1986, the facility was operated as a private, for-profit, psychiatric hospital and was owned by Universal Health Services.

Two Rivers Behavioral Health System had a broad range of in-patient, partial hospitalization, and intensive outpatient services comprising the following units or programs:

- The National Center for Trauma-Based Disorders
- Dual Diagnosis and Addictions
- Spectrum Adult Services
- Renaissance Older Adult Program
- Child and Adolescent Program

The National Center for Trauma-Based Disorders had both trauma stabilization and trauma treatment programs as well as a program for those with trauma and co-occurring eating disorders and addictions.

Two Rivers Psychiatric Hospital was at one time one of two private, free-standing psychiatric hospitals in the Kansas City area, the other being the Research Medical Center's Research Psychiatric Center.

In September 2008 the Centers for Medicare and Medicaid Services (CMS) terminated Two Rivers' participation in Medicare. United Health appealed the decision and eventually agreed to a settlement requiring Two Rivers to retain an outside monitor for six months.

The hospital announced it was closing effective February 9, 2019 after a decision made by its then corporate parent, Universal Health Services.
