= Western Missouri Medical Center =

Geography
- Location: 403 Burkarth Road, Warrensburg, Missouri, United States
- Coordinates: 38°45′57″N 93°43′20″W

Services
- Emergency department: Yes
- Beds: 72

History
- Founded: 1963

Links
- Website: www.wmmc.com
- Lists: Hospitals in Missouri

Western Missouri Medical Center (WMMC) is an acute aid service located in Warrensburg, Missouri. A non-profit county health center, WMMC provides medical care services to people of Johnson County and west central Missouri.

WMMC provides regional clinic locations that covers primary care, specialty care, emergency services and express care.

== Locations ==
Primary care includes family practices in Warrensburg, Higginsville, Concordia and Knob Noster.

Internal medicine, sports medicine, specialty practices, and pediatric clinics are located on the main campus.
