= Barnes-Jewish Hospital =

- BJC HealthCare

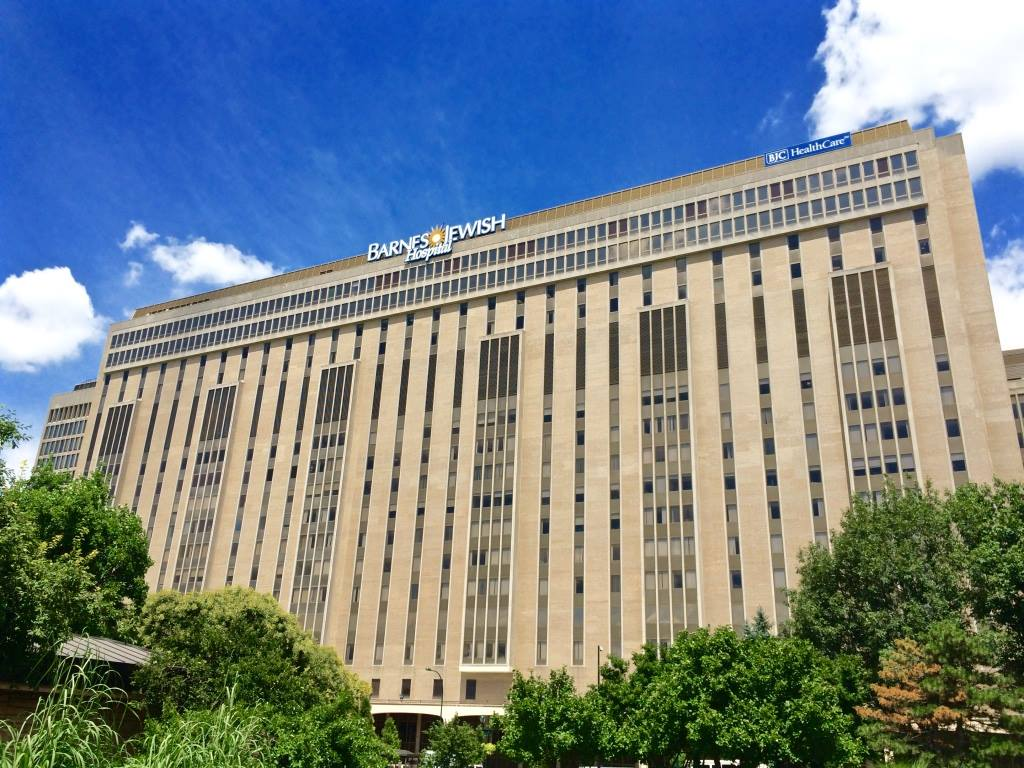

Geography
- Location: St. Louis, Missouri, United States

Organization
- Type: Teaching
- Affiliated university: Washington University School of Medicine

Services
- Emergency department: Level I trauma center
- Beds: 1,266

Helipads
- Helipad: FAA LID: MO91

History
- Opened: 1902

Links
- Website: www.barnesjewish.org
- Lists: Hospitals in Missouri

Barnes-Jewish Hospital is the largest hospital in the U.S. state of Missouri. Located in the Central West End neighborhood of St. Louis, it is the adult teaching hospital for Washington University School of Medicine and a major component of Washington University Medical Center.

U.S. News & World Report ranked Barnes-Jewish among the top hospitals in the nation in its annual report in 2018 and 2022.

== Capacity ==
Barnes-Jewish Hospital is a member of BJC HealthCare and is located on the campus of the Washington University Medical Center. Barnes-Jewish is the largest private employer in Greater St. Louis, employing 10,125 people in 2018, including 1,723 attending physicians. It is responsible for the education of 1,129 interns, residents, and fellows.

As of 2018, the hospital had 1,266 beds with a staff of 12,125.

== History ==
Barnes-Jewish was formed by the merger of two hospitals, Barnes Hospital and The Jewish Hospital of St. Louis. Each hospital was built in the early 1900s in proximity to each other on the eastern edge of Forest Park. Although the hospitals were initially linked by an affiliation agreement in 1993, the two were legally merged in 1996.

Barnes Hospital was founded at the bequest of wholesale grocer and banker, Robert Barnes, who died in 1892. In coordination between Barnes executors and St. Louis philanthropist Robert Brookings, the hospital was intended as an affiliate for the Washington University School of Medicine. Barnes hospital opened on December 7, 1914, at its current location on Kingshighway Boulevard. The hospital was designed by architect Theodore Link and initially had a 373-bed capacity. It was at this time that the St. Louis Children's Hospital, and in 1915 the reorganized school of medicine, were relocated adjacent to Barnes Hospital.

Jewish Hospital was founded in 1902 by leaders of the St. Louis Jewish community in order to care for "the sick and disabled of, 'any creed or nationality.'" The hospital was originally located on 5414 Delmar Boulevard. Due to the increasing number of patients and need for expansion, in 1926 the hospital was relocated two blocks north of the Barnes Hospital/Washington University Medical School complex.

== Heliport ==
Barnes Jewish Hospital Heliport
- IATA: none; ICAO: none; FAA LID: MO91

Summary
- Airport type: Helipad
- Owner: Privately-owned
- Operator: Barnes-Jewish Hospital
- Location: St Louis, Missouri, U.S.
- Elevation AMSL: 513 ft / 156 m
- Coordinates: 38°38′10.5400″N 090°15′57.2900″W
- Website: https://www.barnesjewish.org
- Interactive map of Barnes Jewish Hospital Heliport

Helipads
Number	Length		Surface
Number	ft	m	Surface
H1	40	40	Concrete

The heliport is available for emergency air ambulance service.

== Rankings and achievements ==
Barnes-Jewish Hospital has been named on U.S. News & World Report's Honor Roll of America's best hospitals several times. Barnes-Jewish is a center for multiple specialties ranked among the best nationally, including cancer; digestive disorders; ear, nose and throat; and urology. In 2016, Barnes-Jewish Hospital received a two star rating from Medicare hospital quality rankings.

Becker's Hospital Review ranked Barnes-Jewish Hospital as one of 100 Great Hospitals in March 2012 and 2014, 100 Hospitals With Great Heart Programs in January 2013, and 100 Hospitals and Health Systems With Great Oncology Programs, along with the affiliated Alvin J. Siteman Cancer Center, in February 2013.

In 2023, Barnes-Jewish Hospital received the Magnet Recognition Program designation for nursing excellence from the American Nurses Credentialing Center (ANCC).
