= Creve Coeur, Missouri =

City in St. Louis County, Missouri, United States

- City
- City of Creve Coeur
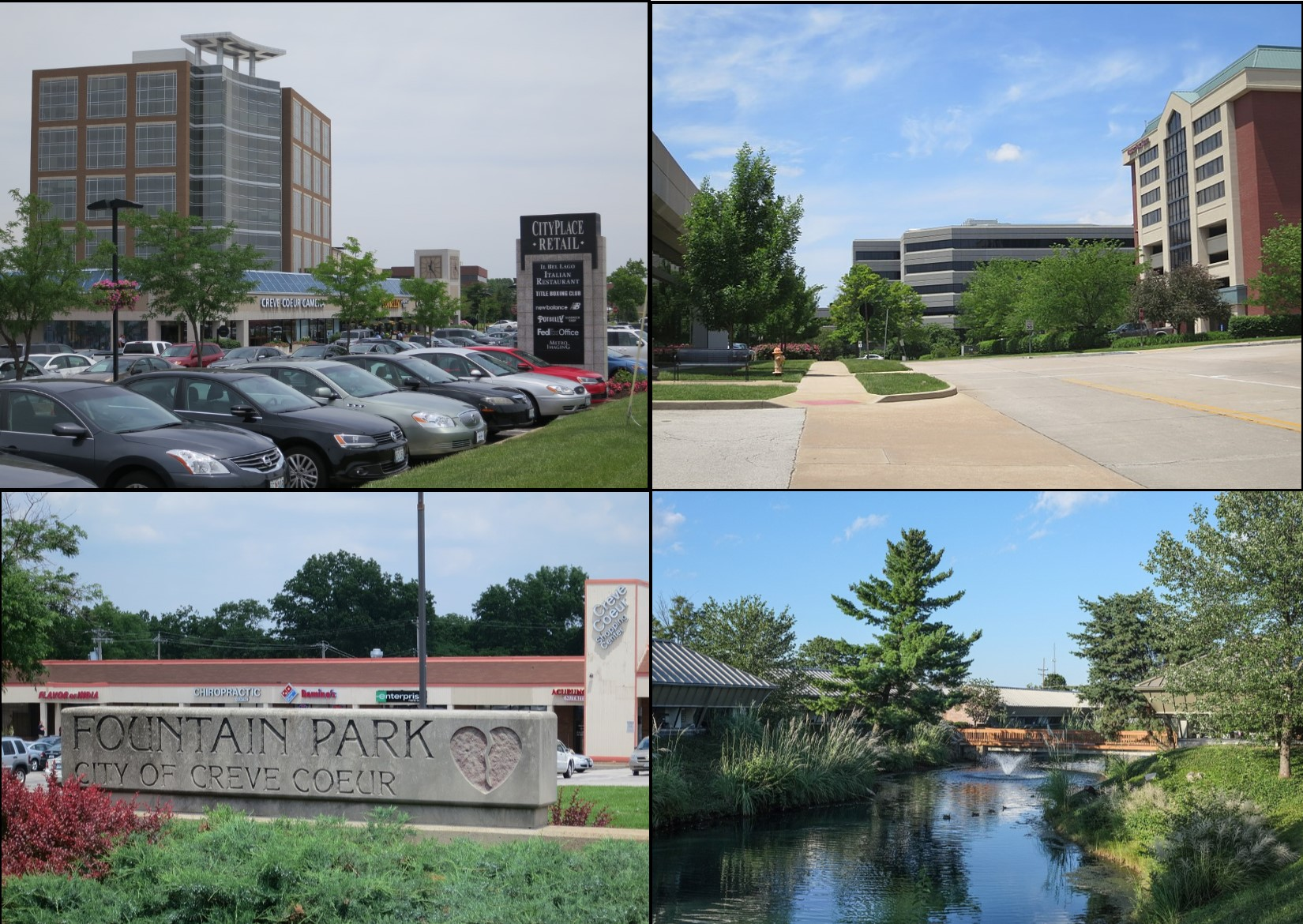
- From top left, left to right: City Place Plaza, Drury Inn and headquarters, Fountain Park, Office park

- Flag Seal

- Location of Creve Coeur, Missouri

- Location within Missouri Location within the United States
- Coordinates: 38°39′43″N 90°26′35″W
- Country: United States
- State: Missouri
- County: St. Louis
- Townships: Creve Coeur, Missouri River, Maryland Heights

Government
  - Mayor: Robert Hoffman

Area
  - Total: 10.27 sq mi (26.61 km^{2})
  - Land: 10.27 sq mi (26.61 km^{2})
  - Water: 0 sq mi (0.00 km^{2})
- Elevation: 614 ft (187 m)

Population (2020)
  - Total: 18,834
  - Density: 1,832.9/sq mi (707.69/km^{2})
- Time zone: UTC-6 (Central (CST))
  - Summer (DST): UTC-5 (CDT)
- ZIP Code: 63141
- FIPS code: 29-17272
- GNIS feature ID: 2393674
- Website: www.crevecoeurmo.gov

Creve Coeur (/ˈkriːv kɔːr/ KREEV kor or /ˈkrɛv kɔːr/ KREV kor) is a city in St. Louis County, Missouri, United States, that is part of Greater St. Louis. Its population was 18,834 at the 2020 census. Creve Coeur borders and shares a ZIP Code (63141) with the neighboring city of Town and Country. It is home to the headquarters of Drury Hotels, and was the home of Monsanto until its acquisition by Bayer in 2018.

== History ==
The name crève-cœur (French: [krɛv.kœʁ]; French for 'heartbreak') is said to derive from Creve Coeur Lake. According to the city's website, the tale goes that the lake "formed itself into a broken heart" after an Indian princess's unrequited love for a French fur trapper led her to jump "from a ledge overlooking" the lake.

Written accounts and archaeological finds show that Native Americans inhabited the Creve Coeur area from 9500 BC to 1800 AD. French explorers began farming and fishing in the area in the early 18th century, and fur trappers settled there in the early 19th century. When the area was acquired by the United States through the Louisiana Purchase in 1803, the Lewis and Clark Expedition came through Creve Coeur. During the American Civil War, men from the area served on both sides of the conflict, but most residents were southern sympathizers.

Creve Coeur was incorporated in 1949. Although cabins more than 200 years old (including two still in Conway Park) are in the community, it grew primarily as a stopping point along Olive Boulevard (now Route 340) between University City and Creve Coeur Lake. It expanded faster following construction of Interstate 270 and U.S. Route 40.

The lake and its associated park of the same name, which was the first county park in St. Louis County, is now part of Maryland Heights to the north of Creve Coeur.

== Geography ==
According to the United States Census Bureau, the city has a total area of 10.27 square miles (26.60 km^{2}), all land.

== Demographics ==
Ranked third in highest assessed value in St. Louis County the median income for a household in the city was $94,852, and the median income for a family was $99,100. Males had a median income of $65,106 versus $39,102 for females. The per capita income for the city was $59,496. About 1.8% of families and 2.9% of the population were below the poverty line, including 1.8% of those under age 18 and 2.7% of those age 65 or over.

=== Racial and ethnic composition ===
Creve Coeur city, Missouri – Racial and ethnic composition Note: the US Census treats Hispanic/Latino as an ethnic category. This table excludes Latinos from the racial categories and assigns them to a separate category. Hispanics/Latinos may be of any race.
Race / Ethnicity (NH = Non-Hispanic)	Pop 2000	Pop 2010	Pop 2020	% 2000	% 2010	% 2020
White alone (NH)	14,461	13,936	13,225	87.64%	78.15%	70.22%
Black or African American alone (NH)	566	1,264	1,690	3.43%	7.09%	8.97%
Native American or Alaska Native alone (NH)	32	31	22	0.19%	0.17%	0.12%
Asian alone (NH)	991	1,798	2,356	6.01%	10.08%	12.51%
Native Hawaiian or Pacific Islander alone (NH)	1	3	6	0.01%	0.02%	0.03%
Other race alone (NH)	19	35	154	0.12%	0.20%	0.82%
Mixed race or Multiracial (NH)	138	305	719	0.84%	1.71%	3.82%
Hispanic or Latino (any race)	292	461	662	1.77%	2.59%	3.51%
Total	16,500	17,833	18,834	100.00%	100.00%	100.00%

Historical population
Census	Pop.	Note	%±
1950	2,040		—
1960	5,122		151.1%
1970	8,967		75.1%
1980	11,743		31.0%
1990	12,304		4.8%
2000	16,500		34.1%
2010	17,833		8.1%
2020	18,834		5.6%
U.S. Decennial Census 2010 2020

=== 2020 census ===
As of the 2020 census, Creve Coeur had a population of 18,834, with 8,358 households and 4,817 families. The median age was 44.3 years; 17.6% of residents were under the age of 18 and 24.2% were 65 years of age or older. For every 100 females there were 92.1 males, and for every 100 females age 18 and over there were 89.2 males age 18 and over. 100.0% of residents lived in urban areas, while 0.0% lived in rural areas. Of the 8,358 households, 22.5% had children under the age of 18 living in them; 49.3% were married-couple households, 18.3% were households with a male householder and no spouse or partner present, and 28.1% were households with a female householder and no spouse or partner present. About 35.7% of all households were made up of individuals and 15.6% had someone living alone who was 65 years of age or older. There were 8,988 housing units, of which 7.0% were vacant. The homeowner vacancy rate was 1.6% and the rental vacancy rate was 8.3%.

Racial composition as of the 2020 census
Race	Number	Percent
White	13,401	71.2%
Black or African American	1,708	9.1%
American Indian and Alaska Native	36	0.2%
Asian	2,361	12.5%
Native Hawaiian and Other Pacific Islander	6	0.0%
Some other race	271	1.4%
Two or more races	1,051	5.6%
Hispanic or Latino (of any race)	662	3.5%

=== 2016–2020 American Community Survey ===
The 2016–2020 5-year American Community Survey estimates show that the median household income was $95,699 (with a margin of error of +/- $12,124) and the median family income was $135,721 (+/- $21,279). Males had a median income of $80,089 (+/- $9,116) versus $38,887 (+/- $5,271) for females. The median income for those above 16 years old was $52,941 (+/- $7,199). Approximately, 2.1% of families and 4.5% of the population were below the poverty line, including 9.9% of those under the age of 18 and 2.7% of those ages 65 or over.

=== 2010 census ===
As of the census of 2010, 17,833 people, 7,654 households, and 4,717 families were living in the city. The population density was 1,736.4 inhabitants per square mile (670.4/km^{2}). The 8,433 housing units had an average density of 821.1 per square mile (317.0/km^{2}). The racial makeup of the city was 79.9% White, 7.2% African American, 0.2% Native American, 10.1% Asian, 0.7% from other races, and 1.9% from two or more races. Hispanics or Latinos of any race were 2.6% of the population.

Of the 7,654 households, 26.0% had children under 18 living with them, 53.2% were married couples living together, 6.2% had a female householder with no husband present, 2.2% had a male householder with no wife present, and 38.4% were not families. About 32.8% of all households were made up of individuals, and 12.4% had someone living alone who was 65 or older. The average household size was 2.26, and the average family size was 2.91.

The median age in the city was 44.3 years; 20.9% of residents were under 18; 7.4% were between 18 and 24; 22.6% were from 25 to 44; 28.5% were from 45 to 64; and 20.7% were 65 or older. The gender makeup of the city was 48.2% male and 51.8% female.

=== 2000 census ===
As of the census of 2000, 16,500 people, 6,988 households, and 4,465 families were living in the city. The population density was 1,628.9 people/sq mi (628.9/km^{2}). The 7,496 housing units had an average density of 740.0/sq mi (285.7/km^{2}). The racial makeup of the city was 88.79% White, 3.45% African American, 0.21% Native American, 6.02% Asian, 0.56% from other races, and 0.97% from two or more races. Hispanics or Latinos of any race were 1.77% of the population.

Of the 6,988 households, 25.6% had children under 18 living with them, 57.6% were married couples living together, 4.6% had a female householder with no husband present, and 36.1% were not families. About 30.9% of all households were made up of individuals, and 10.8% had someone living alone who was 65 or older. The average household size was 2.29, and the average family size was 2.89.

In the city, the age distribution was 21.0% under 18, 6.9% from 18 to 24, 25.0% from 25 to 44, 27.9% from 45 to 64, and 19.2% who were 65 or older. The median age was 43 years. For every 100 females, there were 93.2 males. For every 100 females age 18 and over, there were 91.5 males.

== Government ==
The City of Creve Coeur's Charter was adopted in 1976, providing for a council-city administrator form of government. The mayor is elected by the voters while the city council consists of eight members (two members representing each of four wards, council members are elected to serve staggered two-year terms). The mayor is elected at large for a three-year term. The city administrator is hired by the city council and is responsible for the day-to-day operations of the city. Creve Coeur has 104 government employees.

The city is located in the 2nd Congressional District, 7th and 24th State Senate District, and 82nd and 87th State Representative Districts.

=== Ratings and accreditations ===
The City of Creve Coeur's Standard & Poor bond rating is AAA, one of only four such rated cities in Missouri. The city's police department is accredited through the Commission on Accreditation for Law Enforcement Agencies.

== Education ==
About 68% of Creve Coeur residents have college degrees; 33% have graduate or professional degrees.

=== Primary and secondary schools ===
The western portion of Creve Coeur is part of the public Parkway School District. The eastern portion is served by the Ladue School District. Pattonville School District covers a northeast portion of the city limits of Creve Coeur. Public schools in Creve Coeur include Ladue Schools West Campus, Spoede Elementary School (Ladue Schools), Bellerive Elementary School (Parkway District), and Northeast Middle School (Parkway District).

Creve Coeur has a number of parochial elementary and middle schools including Our Lady of the Pillar, Saul Mirowitz Jewish Community School (formerly Solomon Schechter Day School), and St. Monica; and four private high schools (Saint Louis Priory School, De Smet Jesuit, Chaminade College Preparatory School, and Whitfield School). The Catholic schools are of the Archdiocese of St. Louis.

=== Colleges and universities ===
Missouri Baptist University is located within the city of Creve Coeur along with Covenant Theological Seminary.

== Health care ==
Health-care facilities in Creve Coeur include Barnes-Jewish West County Hospital, which is home to a satellite facility of the Alvin J. Siteman Cancer Center. Creve Coeur also contains Mercy Hospital St. Louis.

== Economy ==
Creve Coeur is recognized as a key node for technology, life and bio sciences, and medical services in the St. Louis region. It is home to Bayer, the Donald Danforth Plant Science Center & the Bio Research and Development Growth Park, all located in the 39 North Agtech Innovation District.

Isle of Capri Casinos moved its headquarters to Creve Coeur from Biloxi, Mississippi, in 2006. The state of Missouri and the city of Creve Coeur had offered Isle of Capri more than $4.2 million in tax incentives. In addition, Correctional Medical Services, Drury Hotels, have their headquarters in Creve Coeur.

Adam's Mark previously had its headquarters in the city.

=== Top 10 employers ===
According to the city's 2011 Comprehensive Annual Financial the top employers in the city are:

#	Employer	# of Employees
1	Mercy Hospital St. Louis	6,272
2	Monsanto Corporation	3,700
3	Thomson Reuters (Markets) LLC	1,000
4	SSM Health Care	450
5	Daugherty Business Solutions	365
6	Plaza Motor Company	350
7	Busey Bank (formerly Pulaski Bank)	300
8	Tubular Steel	262
9	Rock-Tenn	240
10	Ceridian	218

=== Notable businesses ===
According to St. Louis Business Journal Book of Lists 2012, Creve Coeur is home to several leading businesses in the St. Louis region.

St. Louis Book of Lists Category	Creve Coeur Business
Largest Employer	Mercy Hospital (#8)
Largest Hospital	Mercy Hospital (#2), Barnes–Jewish West County Hospital (#21)
Fastest Growing Private Companies	Advanced ICU Care (#6), The Outsource Group/(#16), #2Marcone Supply (23)

=== Technology ===
Five of the top 15 largest information technology consulting firms in St. Louis are located in Creve Coeur, including the top two: TEKsystems, Computer Sciences, Daugherty Business Solutions, Volt Workforce Solutions, Bradford & Galt, Envision, and iBridge Solutions

=== Life and plant sciences ===
Two of the top 10 largest life science research organizations in St. Louis are located in Creve Coeur: Bayer and Donald Danforth Plant Science Center

== Organizations ==
The American Association of Orthodontists has its headquarters in the city.

== Attractions ==
The City of Creve Coeur maintains six parks with amenities including playgrounds, walking trails, tennis courts, and athletic fields. The City of Creve Coeur also operates the Dielmann Recreation Complex, which includes a 9-hole golf course and ice arena.

== Transportation ==
- Lambert–St. Louis International Airport (STL) is 11 miles away. Creve Coeur Airport, in the adjacent suburb of Maryland Heights, serves business and private aircraft.

== Notable people ==
- Michael S. Engel (born 1971), paleontologist and entomologist
- Christian Gray, American football player
- Jon Hamm, actor
- Brad Lander, politician
- Sklar Brothers, comedians and actors
- Jayson Tatum, NBA player for the Boston Celtics
- Matthew Tkachuk, Hockey Player

== See also ==
- List of cities in Missouri
