= Creve Coeur Township, St. Louis County, Missouri =

Township in St. Louis County, Missouri, U.S

Coordinates: 38°40′30″N 90°25′10″W

Creve Coeur Township is a township in St. Louis County, Missouri, which means in French "broken heart".
