= Citizens Memorial Healthcare =

Citizens Memorial Healthcare (CMH) is a fully integrated rural healthcare system. CMH provides comprehensive care to the residents of eight counties in southwest Missouri. CMH refers to two affiliated corporate entities. Citizens Memorial Hospital District is a Missouri public hospital. Citizens Memorial Health Care Foundation is a 501(c)3 non-profit corporation.

CMH provides the following services: hospital inpatient, outpatient, emergency department, ambulance, outpatient surgery, physical therapy, occupational therapy, speech therapy, primary care clinics, walk-in clinics and specialty clinics.

CMH serves the residents of Polk, southern Benton, Cedar, Dade, Dallas, Hickory, northern Greene and St. Clair counties, along with residents in the surrounding geographical area. CMH is one of the 10 largest employers in southwest Missouri with 2,100 employees.

== History ==
Citizens Memorial Hospital opened in 1982. The hospital received accreditation from the Joint Commission on Accreditation of Hospital with no deficiencies in 1983. Recognizing the needs for healthcare in the hospital's service area, CMH expanded to add home health services, home medical equipment programs, mammography equipment, hospice services, and ambulance services within the first 5 years.

In 1986, the Citizens Memorial Health Care Foundation was established as a not-for-profit 501(c)3 entity. The Foundation aids and assists CMH in program and endowment development and operates a number of healthcare services. Within the next two years, CMH completed the third phase of construction, adding an outpatient wing, recovery rooms, clinic rooms, a registration area, community rooms and an area for rehabilitation services.

By 1990, CMH was designated as a Level III Trauma Center. CMH also opened a residential care facility, satellite home medical equipment stores and physician clinics. Over the next five years, CMH continued to grow, adding more physician clinics, a Wellness Center, a long term skilled nursing facility and neurology services.

CMH continued to expand services by becoming the home of Polk County's 911 service, adding a mobile MRI unit, health transit services and additional long-term care facilities. CMH also partners with community groups to provide much needed services to the area, including a dialysis center and the Barceda Families program.

In 2002, CMH upgraded the technology infrastructure to support an Electronic Medical Record. This allows patients to enter the system at any CMH facility and have a comprehensive medical record that is accessible to authorized clinicians throughout the system.

CMH has continued to grow to meet the needs of the community. In 2008, CMH opened the Carrie J. Babb Cancer Center (with Central Care Cancer Center), and the Douglas Medical Center, which houses physician clinics, rehabilitation services and an Ambulatory Surgical Center.

== Structure ==
The Citizens Memorial Healthcare (CMH) System includes an 86-bed acute care hospital, 34 physician clinics, six long-term care facilities, one residential care facility and several independent living units.

CMH has 140 physicians on staff.

CMH represents several specialties including: allergy, anesthesiology, cardiology, counseling, emergency medicine, endocrinology, general surgery, geriatric wellness, gynecology, hematology, hospitalist, nephrology, neurology, obstetrics, occupational medicine, oncology, ophthalmology, orthopedics, otolaryngology, pain management, pathology, pediatrics, physical medicine, plastic surgery, podiatry, primary care/family practice, psychiatry, psychology, pulmonology, radiation oncology, radiology, rheumatology, sleep medicine, sports medicine, surgery, therapy services (including physical, occupational and speech therapy), urology and women's services.

Citizens Memorial Healthcare is directed by CEO/Executive Director Michael Calhoun.

== IT Awards – Project Infocare ==
CMH implemented an Electronic Medical Record (or EMR) in 2003. The implementation project and resulting system is known as Project Infocare. CMH maintains a completely electronic medical record and has eliminated the use of paper medical charts. Because of this, CMH was awarded the prestigious Davies Award of Excellence, a national award recognizing achievement in medical record technology. CMH is the first rural and first non-academic hospital to win the HIMSS award.

CMH was also named to the Hospital & Health Networks Most Wired–Small & Rural Hospital list in 2005, 2006 and 2007. And, to the Most Wired Top 100 list in 2008.

CMH has received numerous grants to expand the system and to demonstrate the value of the EMR. A grant received in 2007 will allow CMH to create a national model program to track and measure quality health standards in the ambulatory care setting.

== Quality awards ==
Citizens Memorial Healthcare has been awarded numerous quality awards throughout the system. In 1993, CMH was selected as one of the top ten rural hospitals in the United States. Citizens Memorial Healthcare Facility and Butterfield Residential Care Center were the first two long-term care facilities in the nation to receive OSHA's VPP Star Status. Today, all five CMH long-term care facilities and Butterfield Residential Care Center are recognized with VPP status.

CMH's long-term care facilities also have been recognized for quality of care. Parkview Healthcare Facility received the prestigious Primaris Nursing Home Quality Award in recognition of care quality and innovative efforts to promote and advance continual improvement.

Ash Grove Healthcare Facility received the American Health Care Association (AHCA)/National Center for Assisted Living (NCAL) Step I Quality Award. Of more than 16,000 long-term care facilities in the United States, only three in Missouri received the award in 2007.

CMH Home Care Services was nominated as a finalist for the Primaris quality award and was nominated as a finalist in the Springfield Business Journal for top home care agencies in southwest Missouri.

CMH Home Care has received additional quality awards including the Home Care Elite award from OCS, which is given to agencies who are considered in the top 25% of all agencies in the United States related to quality of care and financial performance.

== Community events and involvement ==
CMH connects with the community through a wide variety of health and outreach programs, working with local schools and business partners CMH also partners with Bolivar Technical College to help ensure a well-trained and qualified staff for CMH.

CMH offers the Medical Excellence Scholarship Fund. Through this fund, CMH provides financial assistance to local students who are working toward careers in healthcare and who will then return to work in the CMH rural area after their schooling is complete. To date, the fund has provided more than $1 million in assistance to approximately 250 students.

CMH hosts Health Expos to provide the community with low cost labs and health assessments. CMH also hosts several community events with a focus on healthcare, including: Hey Lady Have a Heart, Polk County Community Connections, Dallas County Resource Group, Dade County Community Connections, School Health Expos, Alzheimer's Memory Walk, CMH School Nurse Coalition and many more.
