= Barnes–Jewish West County Hospital =

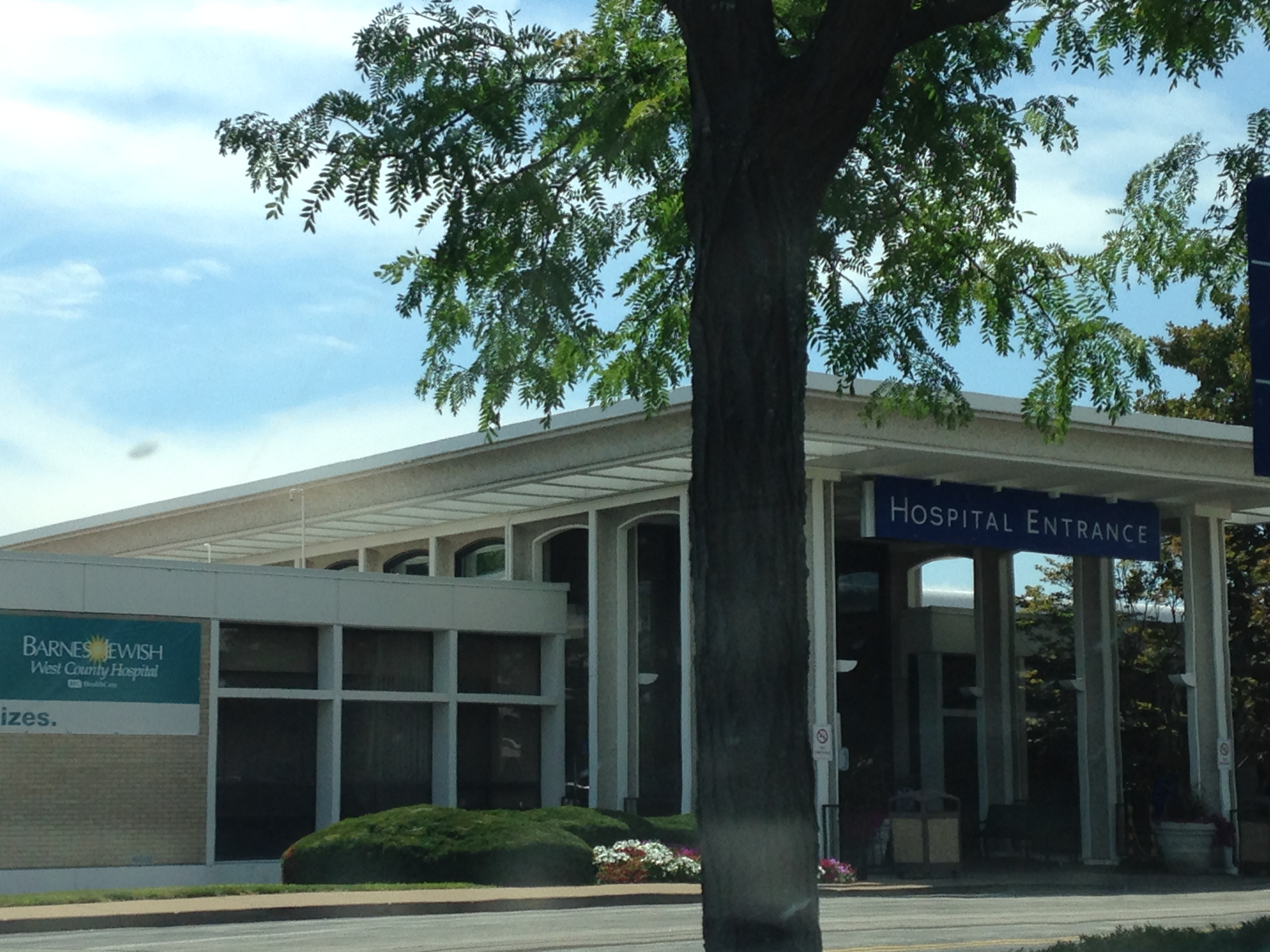

Geography
- Location: 12634 Olive Blvd., Creve Coeur, Missouri, United States
- Coordinates: 38.676270°N 90.467938°W

Organization
- Type: Community
- Network: BJC HealthCare

Services
- Beds: 108

Links
- Website: www.barnesjewishwestcounty.org
- Lists: Hospitals in Missouri

Barnes–Jewish West County Hospital (named Faith Hospital until its purchase by BJC HealthCare) is a 108-bed hospital within Greater St. Louis in the western St. Louis County, Missouri suburb of Creve Coeur. The hospital is located along the major arterial Olive Boulevard (Missouri Route 340), one mile west of Interstate 270.

The campus consists of Washington University School of Medicine and private practice physicians. Barnes–Jewish West County Hospital is a member of BJC HealthCare and employs nearly 500 healthcare professionals. It's also a site of the Alvin J. Siteman Cancer Center.

== In media ==
The hospital was featured in Trauma: Life in the E.R.
