= Mercy Hospital St. Louis =

Coordinates: 38°38′43″N 90°26′46″W

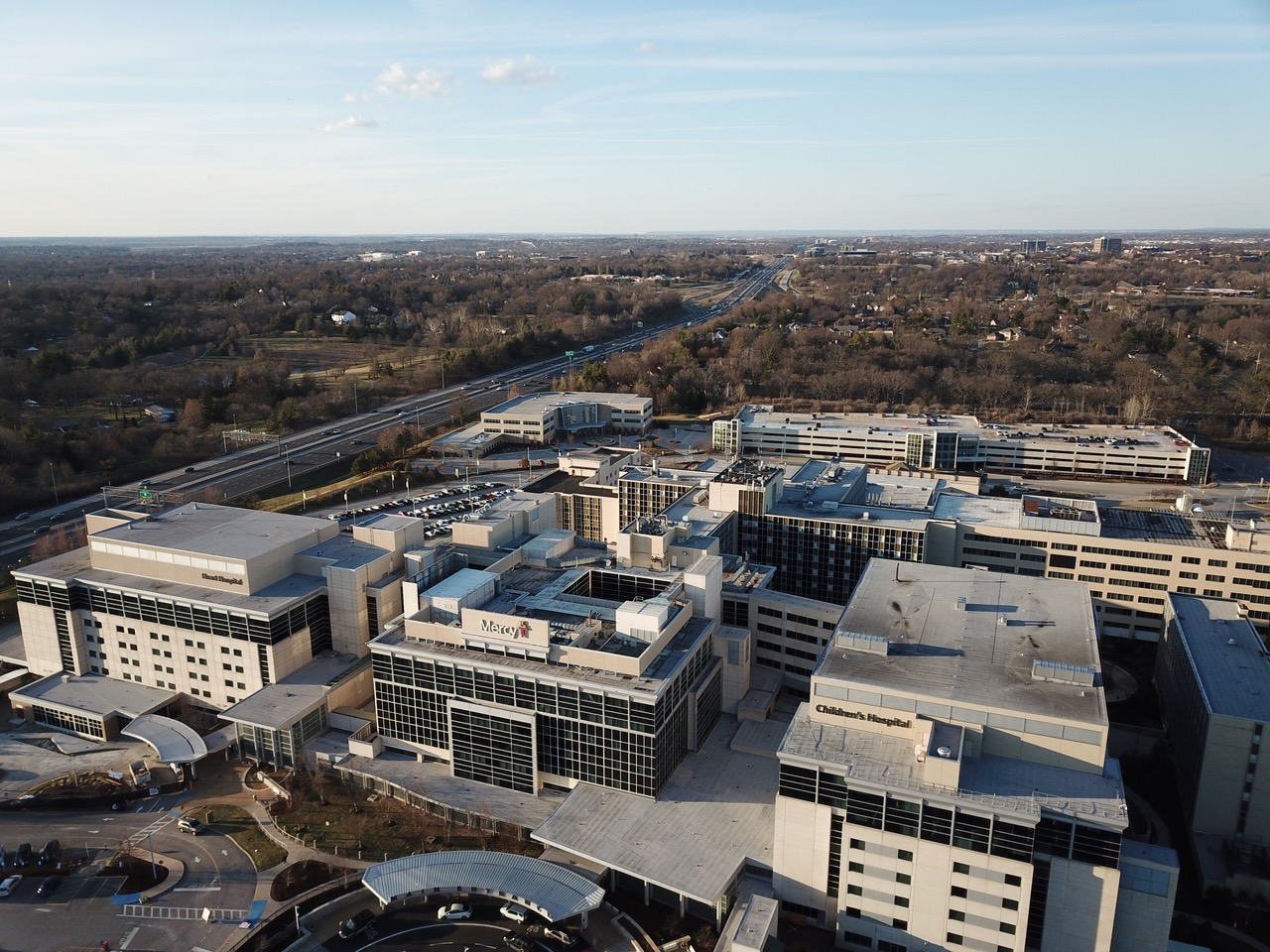
- Mercy Hospital St. Louis in 2018

Geography
- Location: 615 S New Ballas Rd, Creve Coeur, Missouri, United States

Organization
- Type: General

Services
- Emergency department: Level I trauma center
- Beds: 1,252

History
- Opened: 1871

Links
- Website: www.mercy.net
- Lists: Hospitals in Missouri

Mercy Hospital St. Louis is a Catholic hospital operating in Creve Coeur, Missouri, United States, sponsored by the Sisters of Mercy.

== History ==
Mercy Hospital, originally known as St. John's Infirmary, was founded by the Sisters of Mercy in 1871 in downtown St. Louis as a 25-bed hospital in a school building. In 1963, the hospital's current location was founded in Creve Coeur, Missouri. Since then, it has expanded, treating patients in the St. Louis region and other parts of Missouri. In 2018, Mercy Hospital announced plans to open ten primary health care facilities in the St. Louis Metropolitan Area, along with 20 urgent health care centers.

In 2020, the first coronavirus patient in Missouri, a Washington University student returning from Italy, was quarantined at Mercy Hospital.

== Capacity ==
Mercy Hospital has a level IV neonatal intensive care unit as well as the only Level I Trauma center in St. Louis County, Missouri. The hospital also has the David C. Pratt Cancer Center, a heart and vascular hospital, the only pediatric children's hospital in St. Louis County, and a low-risk birthing center.

Mercy Hospital St. Louis is part of the greater organization Mercy Health.

The hospital has 823 licensed beds and 715 staffed beds. It has been recognized by Newsweek on its list of America's Best Hospitals for Specialty Care and America's Best Maternity Hospitals in 2026.

It has a HIMSS State 7 Ranking, making it one of the most technologically advanced hospitals in the country, with an extensive electronic health care system. In 2018, the hospital's children wing earned a gold seal of approval for pediatric asthma, making it the only asthma-certified children hospital in the state.
