= St. Elizabeth Hospital (Hannibal, Missouri) =

Defunct hospital in Missouri, U.S.

- U.S. National Register of Historic Places
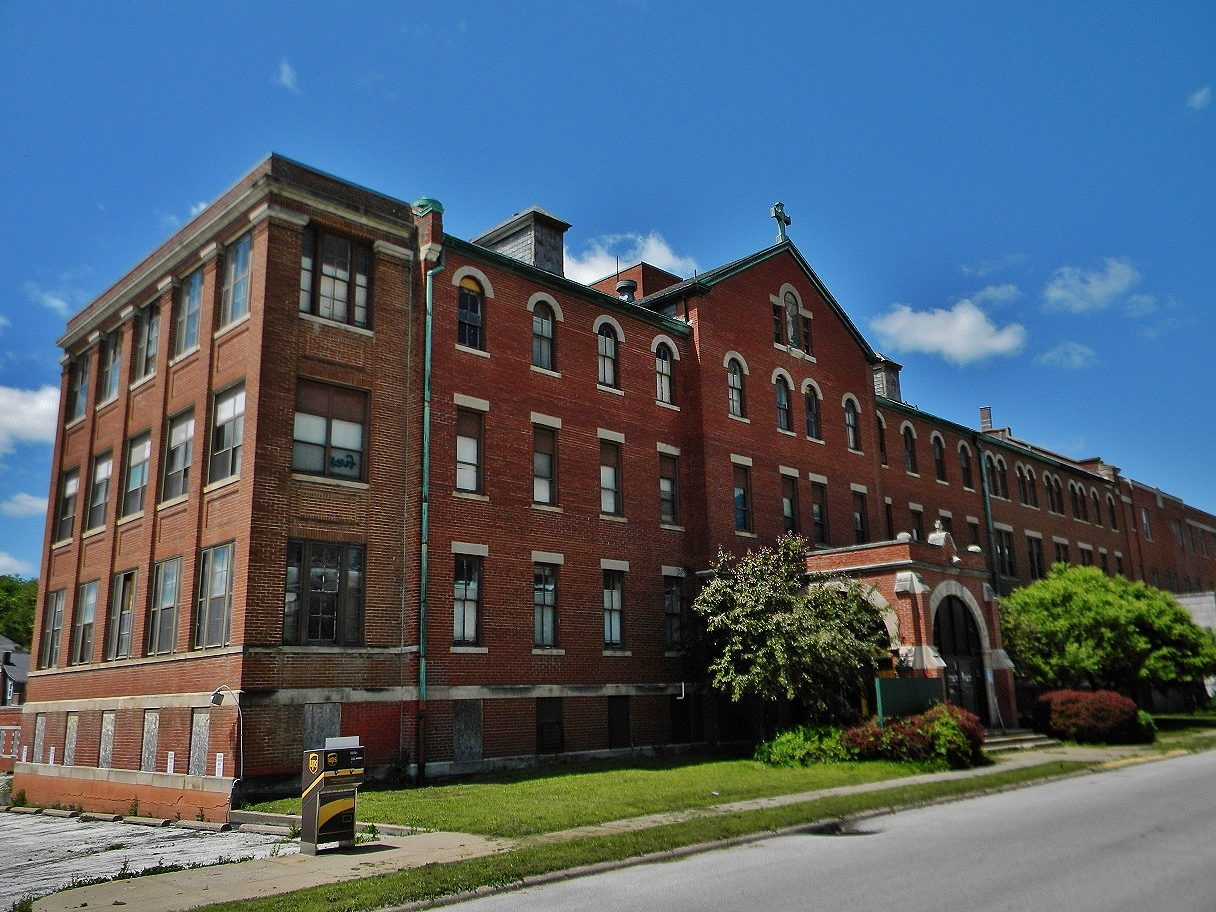
- St. Elizabeth Hospital, May 2016

- Location within Missouri Location within the United States
- Location: 109 Virginia St., Hannibal, Missouri
- Coordinates: 39°42′14″N 91°22′51″W
- Area: less than one acre
- Built: 1915
- Architect: Monnot, C.L.
- Architectural style: Second Renaissance Revival
- NRHP reference No.: 12000500
- Added to NRHP: August 14, 2012

St. Elizabeth Hospital is a historic hospital complex located at Hannibal, Marion County, Missouri. The complex was built in six stages between 1915 and 1973. The original section was built in 1915, and is a three-story with raised basement, Second Renaissance Revival style rectangular red brick building. It features a Palladian style window, large round arched openings on the 1 1/2-story brick portico, and limestone highlights. A sun porch wing was added in 1922 and a chapel wing in 1940.

It was added to the National Register of Historic Places in 2012.
