= St. Luke's Hospital (Chesterfield, Missouri) =

Coordinates: 38.652035°N 90.503342°W

Geography
- Location: 232 S Woods Mill Rd, Chesterfield, Missouri, United States

Organization
- Type: General

Services
- Beds: 493

History
- Founded: 1866

Links
- Website: www.stlukes-stl.com
- Lists: Hospitals in Missouri

St. Luke's Hospital is a general hospital serving West St. Louis County. St. Luke's Hospital is a 493-bed hospital with more than 27 locations in the St. Louis area. St. Luke's has centers for brain, spine, cancer, pulmonary, maternity care, orthopedics, and 60 other specialties.

In 2018, St. Luke's was ranked the seventh-best hospital in Missouri and the fourth-best in the St. Louis area.

== History ==
St. Luke's Hospital was founded in February 1866 as a 25-bed infirmary in St. Louis County. In 2018, St. Luke's entered into an agreement to purchase the nearby Des Peres Hospital. As of 2018, the hospital is affiliated with Cleveland Clinic's Heart and Vascular Institute.
