= Ranken Jordan Pediatric Bridge Hospital =

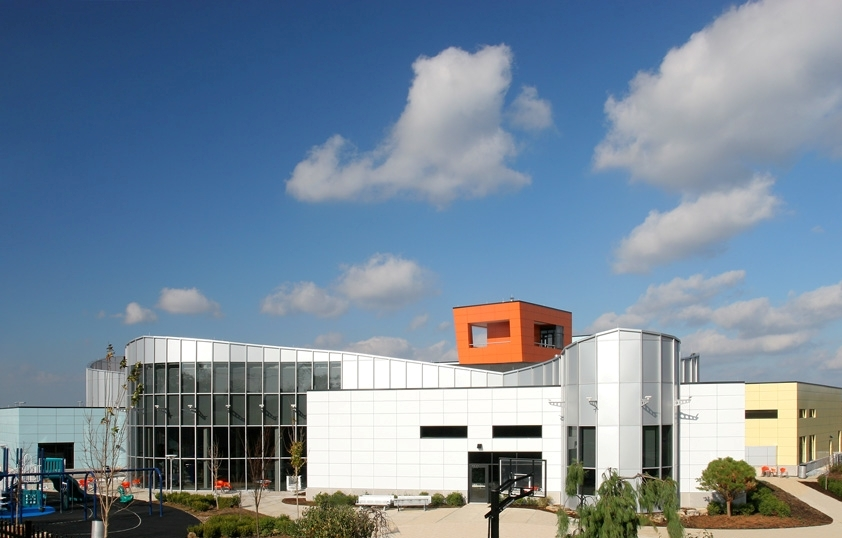
- SE side of Ranken Jordan

Geography
- Location: Maryland Heights, Missouri, United States
- Coordinates: 38°42′36″N 90°24′55″W

Organization
- Care system: Private
- Type: Specialist
- Affiliated university: None

Services
- Emergency department: Sub-acute specialty pediatric
- Beds: 60
- Speciality: Pediatrics

History
- Founded: April 9, 1941

Links
- Website: www.rankenjordan.org
- Lists: Hospitals in Missouri

Ranken Jordan Pediatric Bridge Hospital is a private, not-for-profit, speciality pediatric rehabilitation hospital located in Maryland Heights, Missouri. Ranken Jordan was financed on donations and private investment. The hospital treats infants, children, teens, and young adults aged 0–21.

== Services ==
Ranken provides care for children with complex medical conditions such as brain injuries or complications due to premature birth, as well as interdisciplinary, specialized care, rehabilitation, and treatment for children 2-weeks to 21 years of age. Ranken Jordan is equipped with nursing care, education facilitation services, physical, occupational, speech, respiratory, and recreation therapies, outpatient therapy evaluations and treatment services, comprehensive, interdisciplinary child development programming and social services.

The facility treats children with injuries and illnesses including, but not limited to:

- Brain injuries
- Burns
- Complications from prematurity
- Complications from obesity
- Neuromuscular diseases
- Orthopedic injuries
- Ventilator dependency
- Paralysis

The facility includes: 60 inpatient pediatric beds, therapy gym and aqua therapy pool, developmental testing and child-centered activity areas, computer center, art therapy room, music and movement room, life skills kitchen, and a fully accessible playground both indoor and outdoor. Ranken Jordan is currently the only pediatric specialty hospital in Missouri, and one of only five such facilities in the nation. Children are admitted by referrals from other pediatric health care facilities and from children's hospitals.

== History ==
Ranken Jordan began as a small facility in St. Louis, Missouri in 1941 through the philanthropy of founder Mary Ranken Jordan. It was a small facility located in a rural area. Children came to convalesce from polio, osteomyelitis and bone tuberculosis. Located west of Lindbergh Boulevard, the facility had no air conditioning. Many summer nights, the children would sleep on porch roofs, built especially for that purpose. As the children's bodies healed, they went on their way and others arrived to fill the beds. Mary Ranken Jordan visited regularly to have tea and talk with the children, all of whom she knew by name. The total expenses for the first year of Ranken Jordan were just over $15,100. Sixty-five years later, the average cost to run Ranken Jordan for a single day is $8,200. Mary Ranken-Jordan died in 1962 and left a sizable endowment to maintain her dream. In 2004, the hospital opened its current location in Maryland Heights.

== Administrative leadership ==
- Shawn Dryden – President and Chief Executive Officer
- John Clagg – Chief Financial Officer
- Nick Holekamp, MD – Vice President & Chief Medical Officer

== See also ==
- Gillette Children's Specialty Healthcare
- NACHRI
