= SSM Health DePaul Hospital =

- Sisters of St. Mary/SSM Health

Geography
- Location: 12303 DePaul Drive; Bridgeton, Missouri, United States
- Coordinates: 38°45′3″N 90°26′1″W

Organization
- Care system: SSM Health

History
- Founded: 1828; 198 years ago

Links
- Website: https://www.ssmhealth.com/locations/st-louis/depaul-hospital-st-louis
- Lists: Hospitals in Missouri

SSM Health DePaul Hospital is a hospital in Bridgeton, Missouri which is part of SSM Health. Founded in 1828, it was the first Catholic hospital in the United States and the nation's first hospital west of the Mississippi River.

== History ==
DePaul Hospital was founded in St. Louis, Missouri as The Hospital of the Sisters of Charity. The hospital was founded by four religious sisters of Daughters of Charity of Saint Vincent de Paul, who had travelled to Saint Louis from Emmitsburg, Maryland. The original building was a three-room log cabin donated by local merchant John Mullanphy. In 1832 a three-story building was constructed. William Carr Lane, as mayor of St. Louis, designated the hospital as the city's official hospital until 1846, when a municipal hospital was built. The hospital was eventually renamed the St. Louis Mullanphy Hospital in honor of the Mullanphy family.

In the 1970s, the Mullanphy Hospital moved to their present location in Bridgeton.
