= St. Louis Children's Hospital =

Coordinates: 38.6375°N 90.2651°W

- BJC HealthCare

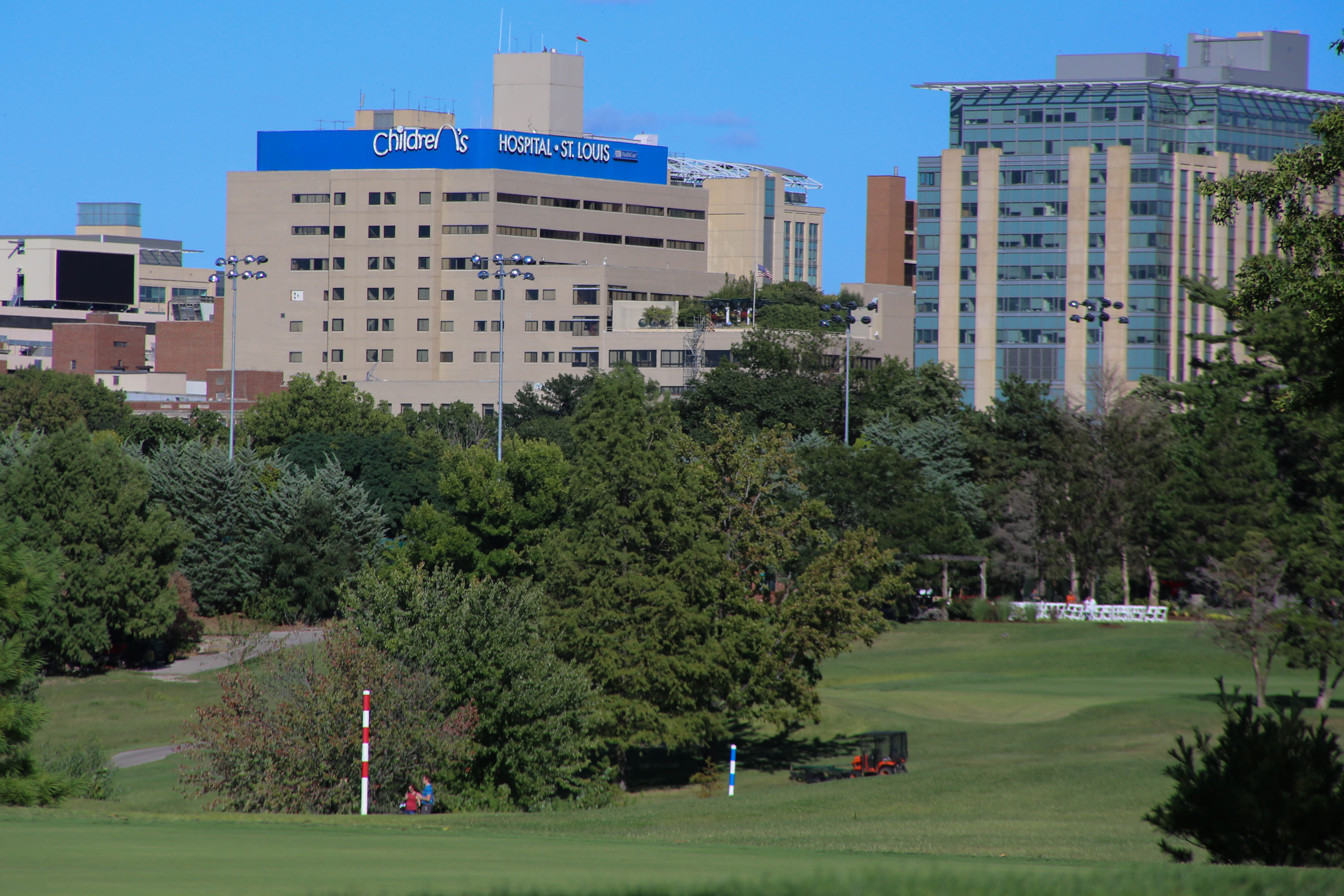

Geography
- Location: 1 Children's Place, St. Louis, Missouri, United States

Organization
- Care system: Non-Profit
- Type: Pediatric
- Affiliated university: Washington University School of Medicine

Services
- Emergency department: Level 1 Pediatric Trauma Center
- Beds: 402

History
- Founded: Founded in 1879, St. Louis Children's Hospital is the oldest pediatric hospital west of the Mississippi River and the 7th oldest in the United States.

Links
- Website: https://www.stlouischildrens.org/
- Lists: Hospitals in Missouri

St. Louis Children's Hospital is a dedicated pediatric hospital in St. Louis, Missouri, and has a primary service region covering six states. As the pediatric teaching hospital for Washington University School of Medicine, St. Louis Children's Hospital offers nationally recognized programs for physician training and research. The hospital has 402 licensed beds, 3,423 employees, 881 physician staff members, and 1,300 auxiliary members and volunteers. The hospital treats infants, children, teens, and young adults aged 0–21.

== History ==
St. Louis Children's Hospital admitted its first two patients in 1879. It was located in a small rented house at 2834 Franklin Avenue. It was the first children's hospital west of the Mississippi River and the seventh oldest in the country. In 1878, Appoline Blair, the widow of Civil War general and U.S. Senator Frank Blair conversed with friends about the need for a hospital dedicated to the care of poor children. Knowing that women assumed most of the care for children, they believed that keeping children healthy would improve women's health as well. Blair encouraged her friends to support the hospital and a female Board of Managers was formed. They supported the daily administration of the hospital and a "gentlemen's advisory board" was responsible for the financial and legal side. After occupying the rented house for a year, the organization raised funds to buy a building on Franklin Avenue. With accommodations limited to fifteen beds, patients with chronic, incurable, or infectious diseases were not admitted. The hospital served patients between two and fourteen years. Eventually the hospital could not turn away children with infectious diseases and the hospital added an isolation ward.

The hospital outgrew its space within a few years and more money was raised to build a new hospital, which opened in 1884 at Jefferson Avenue and Adams Street. The new space could accommodate sixty patients and had a separate ward for infectious cases. A kindergarten was established in the hospital in 1894. A dispensary treated outpatients. The dispensary treated African American children, but it is likely the hospital did not.

In 1907, the hospital started a training program for nurses. Three years later, the nursing school was moved to Washington University (Wash U).

Children's Hospital's relationship with Washington University would prove useful for both institutions. In the early 1900s, Washington University's Medical School was undergoing a re-working after receiving a poor rating during a review in 1909; the medical school was noted to be lacking in full-time faculty and dedicated teaching hospitals. Mrs. Robert Jones, president of the Board of Managers of Children's Hospital saw this as an opportunity. Mrs. John Fowler donated $125,000 to build a new hospital, which was eventually constructed adjacent to the new Barnes hospital on Kingshighway. The Wash U medical school contributions would help solve staffing issues at Children's, and the orthopedic and pediatric hospitals together would help meet the university's need for an affiliated teaching hospitals.

St. Louis Children's Hospital was the first hospital in Missouri to implant the Berlin heart, a ventricular assist device that serves as a bridge to transplant by supporting cardiac function. Today, St. Louis Children's Hospital's clinical and community outreach programs serve more than 250,000 patients annually.

In November 2020, Dwayne "The Rock" Johnson collaborated with Microsoft and billionaire Bill Gates to donate Xbox Series X consoles to St. Louis Children's Hospital along with 19 other children's hospitals throughout the country.

In late November 2020 the hospital announced that they were increasing the age limit of admission to include adult patients to better help with the COVID-19 surge of the adjacent Barnes-Jewish Hospital. Leaders from the hospital said that they were already prepared as the hospital had been treating young adult patients for years already.

== Services ==
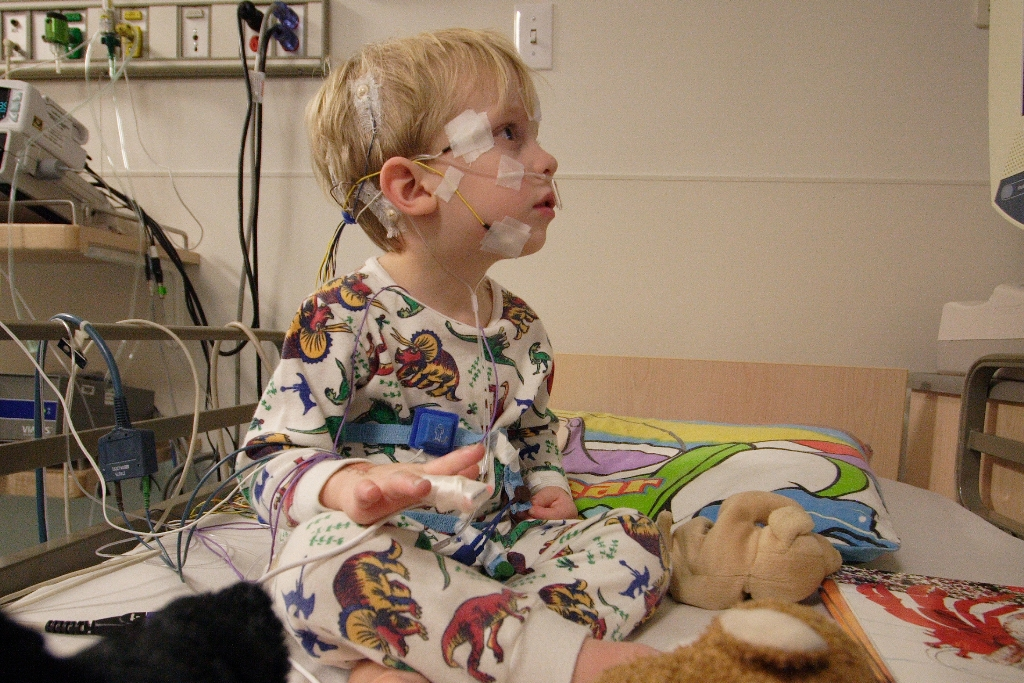
Pediatric polysomnography patient Children's Hospital

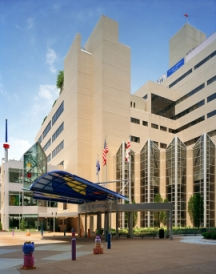
The entrance to St. Louis Children's Hospital.

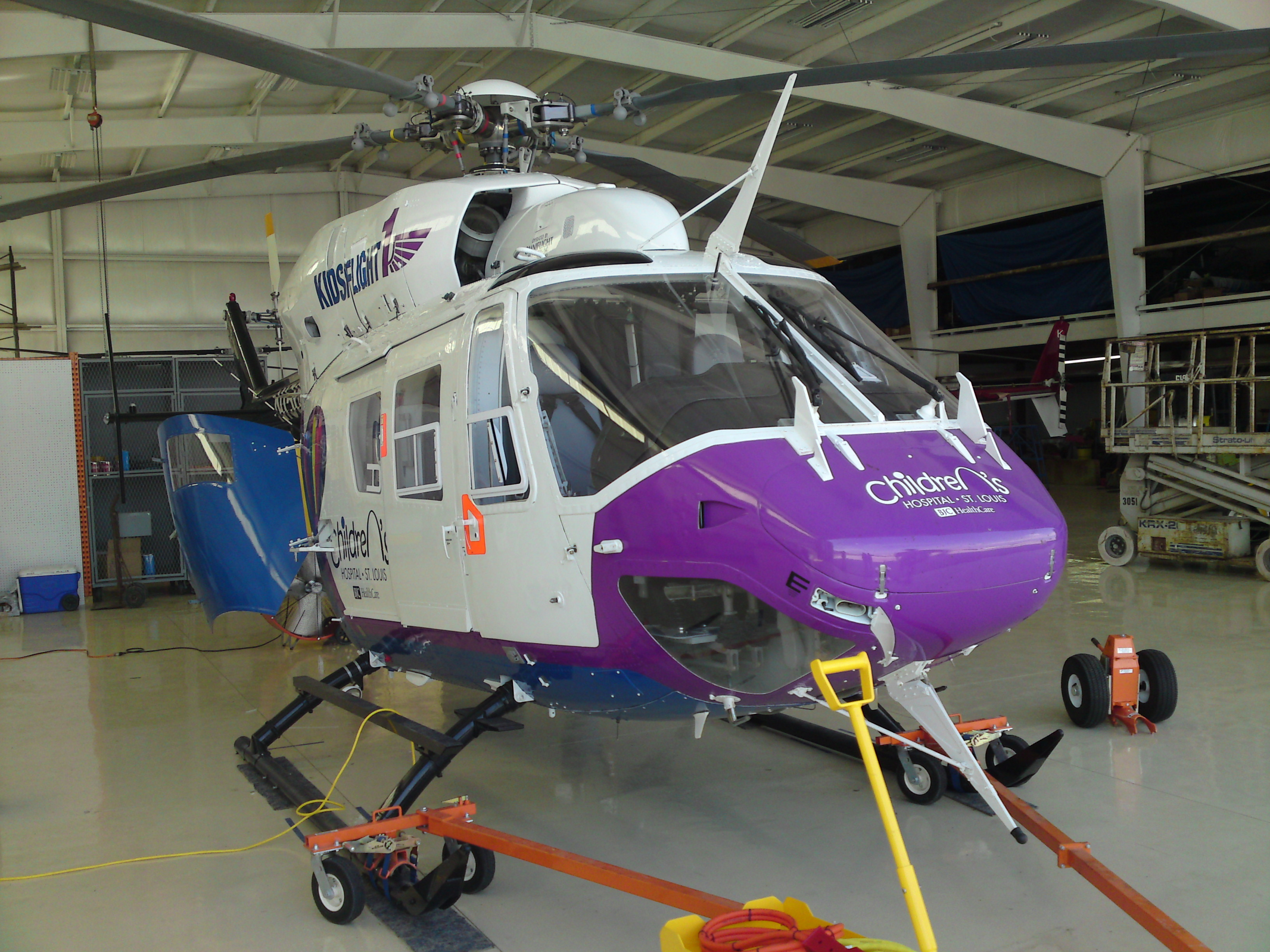
Kidsflight 1 is a MBB/Kawasaki BK 117 helicopter operated by the SLCH transport team

- The hospital offers comprehensive services in every pediatric medical and surgical specialty. It extends its services to children and families in the community through numerous health workshops and educational partnerships. Advocacy efforts have included programs on nutrition and fitness, childhood immunizations, injury prevention, firearm safety, car seat and helmet safety, and smoking prevention and cessation.
- The hospital is one of the largest pediatric organ transplant centers, ranking 6th in the country by total number of transplants performed since 1988 (n=1,319). Transplant programs for heart, lung, liver, kidney, and bone marrow are offered. Notably, St. Louis Children's is home to the world's largest pediatric lung transplant program; approximately 400 lung and lung-heart transplants have been performed.
- The hospital's Center for Cerebral Palsy Spasticity performs more selective dorsal rhizotomy surgeries than any facility in the United States. In January 2019, Dr. T.S. Park performed his 4,000th selective dorsal rhizotomy procedure.
- The hospital offers comprehensive EEG/Epilepsy services. The Epilepsy center consists of a 4-bed outpatient clinic, and a state-of-the-art 9-bed EEG-Video Monitoring Unit. The Epilepsy Center has the facilities to utilize a variety of diagnostic techniques (e.g., SPECT, fMRI, 3T MRI, DTI, PET, MEG, WADA, and ECoG) when evaluating patients for epilepsy surgery.
- The hospital has an imaging center named after sports announcer Joe Buck. It is called the Joe Buck Imaging Center and offer radiology services with a team of radiologists on site.

== Awards and accomplishments ==
Child magazine has named St. Louis Children's Hospital on its list of the nation's '10 Best' pediatric hospitals four consecutive times. In 2008, the magazine ranked Children's newborn medicine and orthopedics program #3; pulmonary medicine and emergency medicine ranked #4; and cardiac services ranked #6.

U.S. News & World Report has repeatedly named St. Louis Children's Hospital on its list of the Best Pediatric Hospitals in America.

- 2008: 6th in neurology and neurosurgery, 11th in neonatal care, 12th in respiratory disorders, 17th in general pediatrics, cancer care, heart and heart surgery, and 23rd in digestive disorders.
- 2009-2011: one of ten hospitals to make the U.S. News Honor Roll by ranking in all 10 specialties evaluated (cancer, diabetes and endocrine disorders, digestive disorders, heart and heart surgery, kidney disorders, neonatal care, neurology and neurosurgery, orthopedics, respiratory disorders, and urology).

In October 2005, Children's Hospital received the nation's highest honor for nursing excellence, the Magnet designation from the American Nurses Credentialing Center (ANCC). To date, only 170 of almost 5,000 hospitals nationwide – 3 percent – have Magnet status. In January 2010, St. Louis Children's Hospital was redesignated as a Magnet hospital by the ANCC Magnet Recognition Program. Only 2 percent of hospitals nationally have achieved Magnet redesignation.

== Children's Discovery Institute ==
In 2006, St. Louis Children's Hospital and Washington University School of Medicine collaborated to establish the Children's Discovery Institute with a goal of accelerating cures for childhood disease in four areas: congenital heart disease, cancer, lung and respiratory disorders, and musculoskeletal diseases.

As one of the country's top recipients in research grants, the School of Medicine's Department of Pediatrics received more than $24 million for pediatric research in 2005, ranking it in the top seven in the country. When combined with grants awarded to other pediatric disciplines, grants exceeded $30 million, placing the medical school's pediatric services as a consistent leader in National Institute of Health funding.
