= Missouri Baptist Medical Center =

- BJC HealthCare

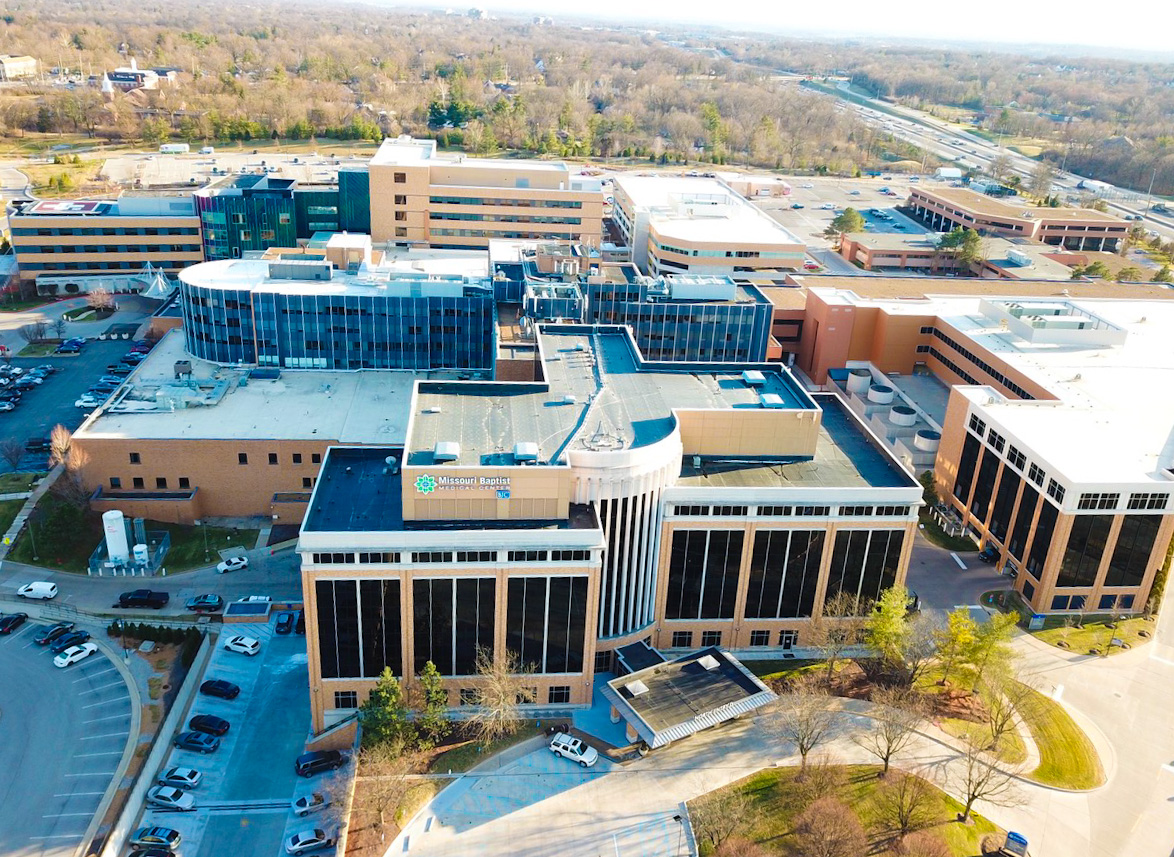
- Missouri Baptist Medical Center, 2018

Geography
- Location: 3015 N Ballas Rd, Town and Country 63131, Missouri, United States
- Coordinates: 38°38′10″N 90°26′49″W

Organization
- Type: General

Services
- Beds: 489 (2006)

History
- Opened: 1886

Links
- Website: www.missouribaptist.org
- Lists: Hospitals in Missouri

Missouri Baptist Medical Center, known locally as MoBap, is a hospital in Town and Country, Missouri. Its origins were in 1884 when Dr. William H. Mayfield opened his home to patients. In 1886 it opened as the Missouri Baptist Sanitarium. In 1892, it offered ambulance service via horse and carriage. A Nursing Training School opened in 1895.

As of 2006, the facility had 489 beds and 3000 employees. It is part of BJC HealthCare.
