= Mercy (healthcare organization) =

American Catholic health care organization

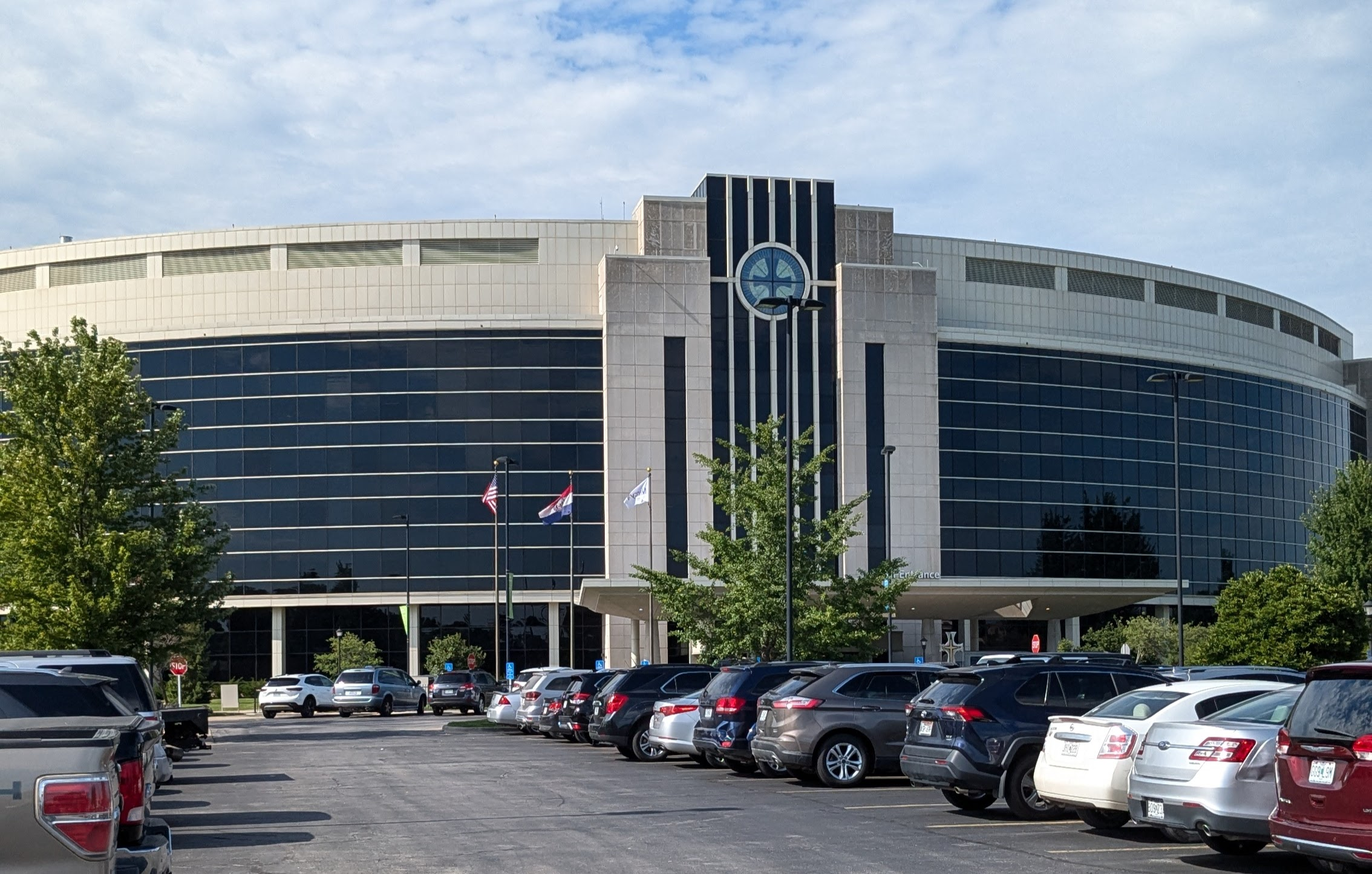
- Mercy Hospital in Springfield, Missouri
- Industry: Healthcare
- Founded: 1871
- Founder: Religious Sisters of Mercy
- Headquarters: 14528 S. Outer Forty Rd., Chesterfield, Missouri, United States
- Area served: Missouri, Arkansas, Oklahoma, Kansas, Texas, Louisiana and Mississippi
- Number of employees: 40,000
- Website: mercy.net

Mercy is an American nonprofit Catholic healthcare organization founded in 1871 by the Sisters of Mercy. It is located in the Midwestern United States with headquarters within Greater St. Louis in the west St. Louis County, Missouri suburb of Chesterfield. Mercy is the seventh largest Catholic health care system in the United States.

Mercy has more than 55 acute care and specialty hospitals. It employs more than 50,000 caregivers and more than 5,000 physicians and advanced practitioners.

== Locations ==
Mercy operates in Missouri, Illinois, Arkansas, Oklahoma and Kansas, and has ministry outreach programs in Texas, Louisiana and Mississippi. Mercy's largest hospital complexes are in Greater St. Louis; Springfield, Missouri; Joplin, Missouri; Northwest Arkansas; Fort Smith, Arkansas; and Oklahoma City.

== Leadership ==
Steve Mackin is the current CEO of Mercy as of April 1, 2022. Lynn Britton served as the president and CEO of Mercy since January 2009.
