= BJC HealthCare =

American healthcare organization

- Founded: 1993; 33 years ago
- Type: Healthcare provider
- Headquarters: 4901 Forest Park Avenue, St. Louis, Missouri, U.S.
- Services: 28 hospitals
- President and CEO: Richard Liekweg
- Senior Vice President and CFO: Kevin Roberts
- Parent organization: BJC Health System
- Revenue: $10 billion
- Website: www.bjc.org

BJC HealthCare is a non-profit health care organization based in St. Louis, Missouri. BJC includes two nationally recognized academic hospitals – Barnes–Jewish Hospital and St. Louis Children's Hospital, which are both affiliated with the Washington University School of Medicine.

On January 1, 2024, it completed the merger of its operations with those of Saint Luke's Health System, forming BJC Health System.

== History ==
BJC HealthCare was created in 1993 when Barnes–Jewish Inc. merged with Christian Health Services. In 1994, Missouri Baptist Medical Center and St. Louis Children's Hospital joined BJC HealthCare. In addition to operating 12 hospitals in Missouri and Illinois, BJC HealthCare operates BJC Home Care Services, which offers hospice, home infusion and medical equipment services; BJC Corporate Health Services, including BarnesCare, an occupational health organization; BJC Behavioral Health, offering behavioral health services to children and adults; and BJC Medical Group.

== Facilities ==
=== Barnes–Jewish Hospital ===
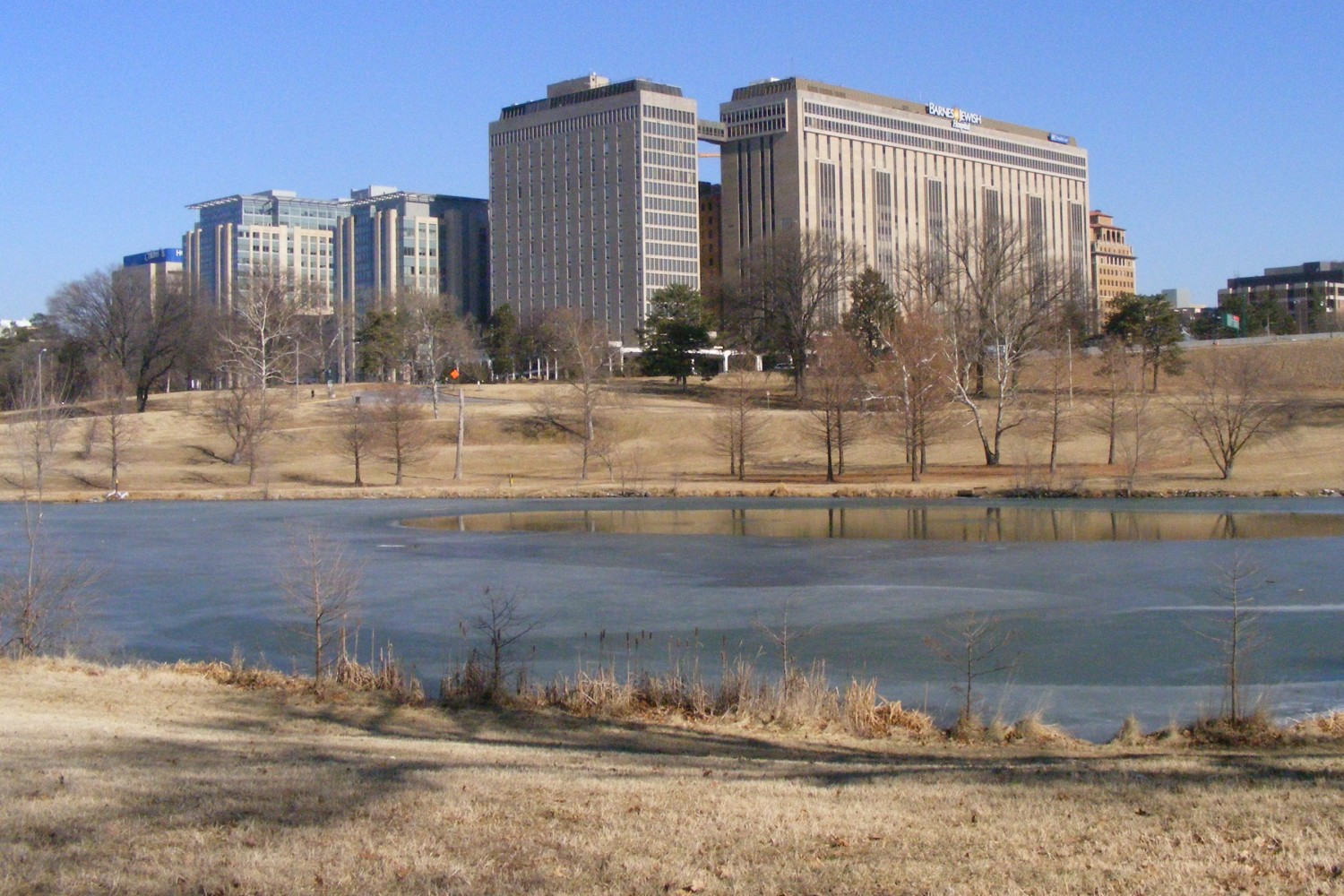
Barnes-Jewish Hospital

Barnes–Jewish Hospital is the largest hospital in the St. Louis area and in the state of Missouri. It is the adult teaching hospital for Washington University School of Medicine and is one of three Level I trauma centers in St. Louis.

Barnes–Jewish was formed by the 1996 merger of two hospitals, Barnes Hospital and The Jewish Hospital of St. Louis. The current facility houses the Charles F. Knight Emergency and Trauma Center.

Barnes–Jewish Hospital also contains the Center for Advanced Medicine and the Alvin J. Siteman Cancer Center, a partnership between Barnes-Jewish Hospital and the Washington University School of Medicine. The Siteman Cancer Center is the only cancer center in Missouri that holds Comprehensive Cancer Center designation from the National Cancer Institute.

Barnes–Jewish Hospital has earned a place on U.S. News & World Report's Honor Roll several times. In 2012, the hospital was ranked 6th in the country by U.S. News & World Report. Barnes–Jewish Hospital received a 2-star rating from medicare in 2016.

=== Alton Memorial Hospital ===
Alton Memorial Hospital is a 206-bed hospital located in Alton, Illinois, serving the River Bend area of southwestern Illinois. The facility offers the area's only balloon angioplasty program, open MRI through Twin Rivers MRI Center, CT services, PET imaging, and nuclear medicine and other advanced medical imaging services, as well as cardiac and pulmonary rehabilitation. The hospital also operates a 24-hour emergency center and the region's only hospital-based ALS ambulance service.

Alton Memorial Hospital recently opened a new 76-bed patient care tower. The Duncan Wing houses the hospital's Surgical Care Unit (12 beds), Intermediate Care Unit (32 beds) and Medical Care Unit (32 beds). Six observation rooms also are available on the ground floor.

Alton Memorial Hospital was also a recipient of a 2009-2010 Hospital Value Index: Best in Value Award by a Data Advantage LLC study.

=== Barnes–Jewish St. Peters Hospital ===
Barnes–Jewish St. Peters Hospital (BJSPH) is a 111-bed facility in St. Peters that serves St. Charles, Lincoln and Warren counties. The hospital has a 16-bed emergency department, as well numerous other patient services, including cardiology and pulmonary services. In 2004, the hospital completed an $18.5 million expansion that included new cardiology and women's centers, in addition to the Outpatient Surgery and Endoscopy Center. Construction was also begun in 2008 on a two-story $28 million expansion project to add 64 additional patient rooms, a new inpatient pharmacy and medical office space to the facility.

Barnes–Jewish St. Peters also houses a satellite facility of the Alvin J. Siteman Cancer Center, which is a partnership between BJSPH and the Washington University School of Medicine. The hospital received a 2009 HealthGrades Outstanding Patient Experience Award for being in the top 10 percent in the nation for patient satisfaction.

=== Barnes–Jewish West County ===
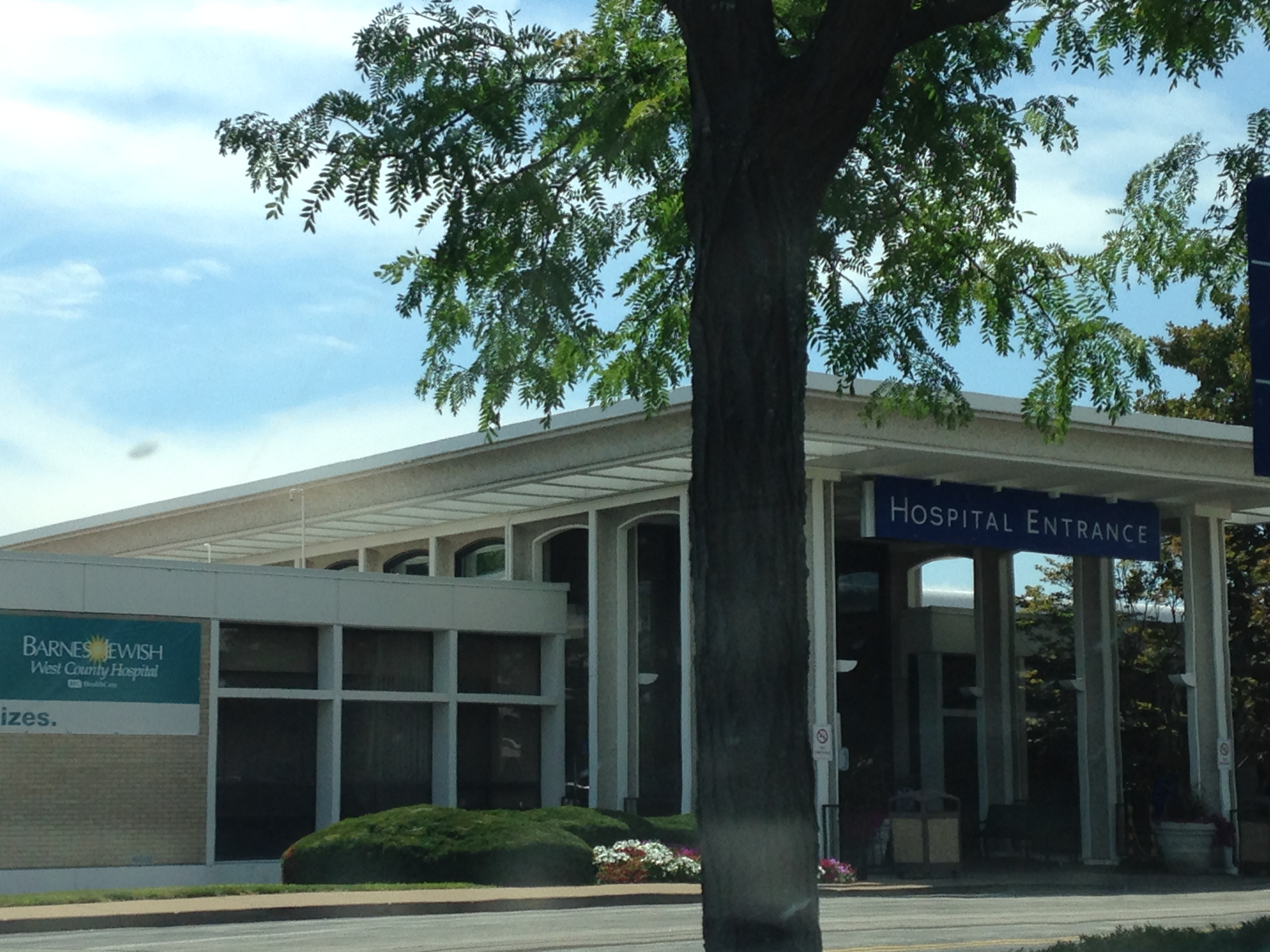
Barnes-Jewish West County Hospital

Barnes–Jewish West County Hospital (on the site of the former Faith Hospital) is a 108-bed hospital in St. Louis County, Missouri. The hospital recently underwent an $11.2 million renovation that included adding a new emergency department, updating operating rooms and renovating each patient room and public space. The campus consists of Washington University School of Medicine and private practice physicians. Barnes–Jewish West County Hospital is a member of BJC HealthCare and employs nearly 500 health care professionals. The campus also includes a satellite facility of the Alvin J. Siteman Cancer Center.

=== St. Louis Children's Hospital ===
St. Louis Children's Hospital is a 390-bed pediatric hospital that provides services to the St. Louis metropolitan area and a primary service region covering six states. The facility is the pediatric teaching hospital for Washington University School of Medicine. It is the only Pediatric Level I Trauma Center in Missouri. Founded in 1879, SLCH is the oldest pediatric hospital west of the Mississippi River and the seventh oldest in the United States.

St. Louis Children's Hospital offers every possible pediatric specialty and sees more than 275,000 patients each year. The facility has performed more pediatric lung transplants than any other institution in the world, was the first hospital to administer insulin to a pediatric patient in the United States, and performed the first split-liver transplant on a child. The SLCH transport team, which covers hospitals primarily in Missouri and Illinois, is composed of a specially trained physician, a critical care nurse, and a paramedic, with respiratory therapists accompanying the team as needed, and can be en route within 30 minutes.

In 2009, Parents magazine ranked St. Louis Children's Hospital No. 5 on its list of the 10 Best Children's Hospitals in the country. Also in 2010, the hospital was named by U.S. News & World Report to its Honor Roll of America’s Best Children’s Hospitals, as it has been for the past eight years.

In 2013, U.S. News Best Children's Hospitals 2013-14 ranked St. Louis Children's Hospital No. 6 out of the 179 considered for evaluation. The Neurology & Neurosurgery specialty ranked the highest for the hospital at #2 in the U.S.

=== Missouri Baptist Medical Center ===
Missouri Baptist Medical Center is a 489-bed hospital located at Interstate-270 and Highway 40/I-64 in West St. Louis County. Missouri Baptist Medical Center was founded in 1886 and joined BJC HealthCare in 1994. The hospital offers a wide spectrum of medical and surgical services, specializing in obstetrics, heart services, cancer services and orthopedics.

In addition to a 20-bed emergency department for adults, MBMC has a full-size emergency department for children, with nine beds plus six more for longer term, in-patient care. The ER is staffed with nurses and physicians who specialize in pediatric medicine.

In 2010 Thomson Reuters named Missouri Baptist Medical Center a "Top 100" hospital for the second year in a row.

Missouri Baptist Medical Center has also received high marks by HealthGrades, a health care rating organization. In 2010, the hospital was rated No. 1 for overall Cardiac Services in Missouri, as well as receiving the Cardiac Care Excellence Award and Coronary Intervention Excellence Award for 2009 and 2010.

=== Missouri Baptist Sullivan Hospital ===
Missouri Baptist Sullivan Hospital is a 75-bed facility located in Sullivan, Missouri, that serves the citizens of Crawford, Franklin and Washington counties. The facility serves almost 22,000 patients yearly and offers pulmonary, cancer, cardiac, behavioral, OB/Gyn, and rehabilitative care.

=== Progress West Hospital ===
The newest hospital in BJC HealthCare, Progress West Hospital is a 72-bed facility located in southern St. Charles County. The hospital opened in 2007 and has many technological advances, including the Patient Touch Technology (PTT) system, online express registration and Vocera communication system. Progress West offers a wide array of cardiac, surgical, birthing, and orthopedic services, along with an emergency department and a six-bed Intensive Care Unit (ICU). Progress West has a branch of St. Louis Children's Hospital located on site and was also the first hospital in the St. Louis area to use social media to alert patients to emergency department wait times.

=== Parkland Health Center ===
Parkland Health Center comprises two former independent community hospitals, Farmington Community Hospital and Bonne Terre Hospital. All are located in St. Francois County. Farmington Community and Bonne Terre Hospitals merged in 1991. BJC took ownership of Mineral Area Regional Medical Center on May 1, 2015, but closed the hospital, which was renamed Parkland Health Center-Weber Road on January 19, 2016, leaving Parkland as the only hospital in St. Francois County.

Parkland Health Center-Bonne Terre is a critical access hospital that houses specialists in the areas of cardiology, ENT, gastroenterology, neurology, Ob/Gyn, oncology, orthopedics, podiatry, pulmonary medicine, urology and vascular medicine. The hospital also contains an emergency department, oncology department and sleep apnea lab.

Parkland Health Center–Liberty Road is a 130-bed hospital with services for maternity and pediatrics, laboratory and radiology, cardiac rehabilitation, a cardiopulmonary department, surgical, physical therapy, diabetes clinic and renal dialysis clinic. The hospital also contains an emergency department and bariatric chamber for hyperbaric medicine.

In 2010 Parkland Health Center was ranked in America's Best 16 Community Hospitals by Becker's Hospital Review. It was the only facility in Missouri to be so honored.

=== Christian Hospital ===
Christian Hospital is a community hospital located at the interchange of Interstate 270 and Highway 367 in north St. Louis County, Missouri. Founded in 1903, Christian Hospital is one of the founding members of BJC HealthCare and specializes in heart surgery, neurological and stroke services, and diabetes care. Christian Hospital operates one of the busiest emergency departments in the state, as well as an EMS department that provides ALS ambulance service to north St. Louis County.

Christian Hospital has been ranked in the top 10 percent nationally for medical excellence in stroke care (2016, 2015, 2014), and ranked in the top seven percent nationally for clinical quality excellence for heart failure treatment (2015). In 2014, the Joint Commission rated Christian Hospital a “Top Performer on Key Quality Measures” for achieving excellence in accountability measures of performance for heart attack, heart failure, pneumonia and surgical care. Additionally, Christian Hospital has received awards for its EMS, Community Health Access Program (CHAP) and other community outreach efforts.

Christian Hospital's Northwest HealthCare campus in Florissant, Missouri, includes a satellite facility of the Alvin J. Siteman Cancer Center.

=== Northwest HealthCare ===
Northwest HealthCare is an outpatient subsidiary of Christian Hospital located in Florissant, Missouri. Services include: emergency department, sleep lab, bone density testing, mammography, ultrasound and MRI. A satellite facility of the Alvin J. Siteman Cancer Center opened on the Northwest HealthCare campus in 2019.

=== The Rehabilitation Institute of St. Louis ===
A joint venture between BJC HealthCare and HealthSouth, The Rehabilitation Institute of St. Louis is a 96-bed rehabilitation hospital. Founded in 2001, the institute offers inpatient, outpatient and community rehabilitation services for survivors of stroke, brain injury, spinal cord injury, amputations, orthopedic conditions, and cancer. The facility is also affiliated with Washington University School of Medicine.

=== Memorial Hospital Belleville ===
Protestant Memorial Medical Center (dba Memorial Hospital Belleville) is a 222-bed acute care hospital built in 1958, located at 4500 Memorial Dr., Belleville, Illinois. Located on the West End, the hospital has 1,979 employers making it the largest employer in the city. BJC and Memorial formed a strategic affiliation that went into effect at the beginning of 2016 that created a new nonprofit parent organization, Memorial Regional Health Services (MRHS), that was jointly owned by the two health systems. According to the terms of the affiliation agreement, BJC could exercise its right to obtain sole ownership of MRHS after five years and upon achievement of certain conditions. BJC met those conditions within two years and assumed sole ownership of Memorial and Memorial East Hospitals on January 1, 2018.

The hospital has a 108-bed skilled nursing facility on its campus and as of 2007 was the busiest emergency room in the Metro East with 50,000 annual visits.

Prior to partnering with, then acquiring Memorial Hospital, BJC originally planned to construct Progress East Hospital, a twin to Progress West Hospital in O'Fallon, Missouri, and in 2007 purchased approximately 110 acres on Frank Scott Parkway East fronting Interstate 64 just east of Green Mount Road.

=== Memorial Hospital Shiloh ===
A 94-bed sister hospital of Memorial Hospital Belleville, opened in 2016 to serve the growing O'Fallon/Shiloh area and was originally known as Memorial Hospital East. Memorial Hospital Shiloh is located 8 miles east of the Belleville campus in Shiloh, Illinois, adjacent to Interstate 64 and has 545 employees. A satellite facility of the Alvin J. Siteman Cancer Center opened on the Memorial Hospital Shiloh campus in 2020.
