= Oswego Community Hospital =

- HMC/CAH
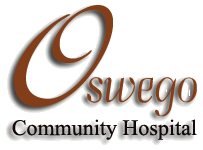

Geography
- Location: Oswego, Kansas, United States
- Coordinates: 37°09′33″N 95°06′40″W

Organization
- Care system: Private
- Type: Critical access

Services
- Emergency department: 24 hr. ER, ExpressCare
- Beds: 12

Links
- Website: https://oswegocommunityhospital.com
- Lists: Hospitals in Kansas

Oswego Community Hospital (OCH) was a federally and state-designated 12 bed critical access hospital located in Oswego, Kansas, and one of several hospitals that fell victim to an alleged fraudulent billing scheme that the U.S. Department of Justice says was executed by EmpowerHMS, the hospital's former operator.

== History ==
In 2007 Oswego Medical Center was purchased by HMC/CAH Consolidated, Inc. and the name changed to Oswego Community Hospital. The facility had in recent years been previously sponsored by and affiliated with Mt. Carmel Regional Medical Center of Pittsburg, Kansas with help from St. John's Regional Medical Center in Joplin, Missouri.

At some point in the past decade, EmpowerHMS purchased Oswego Community Hospital. During this time, a sponsorship agreement was signed with Labette County-owned, privately funded Labette Health of Parsons, Kansas, in December 2010, bringing the only two hospitals in Labette County together with a cooperative agreement. OCH provided a wide variety of services, including General Medical care, Senior Mental Health programs, a 24-hour Emergency Department, ExpressCare, multiple daytime walk-in clinics, a wound care program, various radiology, sexual assault and abuse help, laboratory, observation, physical therapy, dietary services, respiratory care, Swing Bed, a pharmacy, pastoral care, and out-patient services. A portable CT Scanner and MRI truck were also available on-call, and OCH had contracted with EagleMed to provide emergency air transport to more qualified hospitals.

On February 13, 2019, Oswego Community Hospital abruptly closed its doors, "citing [a] failure to expand Medicaid" and "low patient volumes." However, later in 2019, Kansas Attorney General Derek Schmidt announced his office had executed a search warrant as part of a broader investigation of the hospital's operator, EmpowerHMS. In June 2020, federal indictments were unsealed, revealing that several persons associated with EmpowerHMS were indicted by the U.S. Department of Justice for their alleged role in a $1.4 billion fraudulent billing scheme.

In April 2020, the hospital's assets, including the former hospital site, a former clinic location, and other real estate, were purchased out of bankruptcy by Oswego NeuroPsych Hospital, Inc.

== Current Services ==
The hospital is not currently operational. During the COVID-19 pandemic, Oswego NeuroPsych Hospital, Inc., lent personal protective equipment, including portable ventilators and other equipment, to the Kansas Department of Emergency Management.

== Future Operations ==
On April 15, 2020, local newspaper Labette Avenue reported that Oswego NeuroPsych Hospital, Inc., intended to reopen the former hospital in Oswego.

As of 2024, Haskell Regional Hospital of Stigler, Oklahoma had re-opened at least two of the former hospitals clinics, one in Oswego and another in Chetopa. The Oswego location offers Primary Care Medicine, Ultrasounds, Full-service Lab, Covid Testing, Diabetic Clinic, Foot Exams, Wound Clinic, Weight Loss Management, Hormone Replacement Therapy, Birth Control, Infusion Therapy, Skin Cancer Screening Sports Physicals, Pre-employment Physicals, Trigger Point Injections, and Free Blood Pressure Checks.
