= List of presidential trips made by George W. Bush (2007) =

This is a list of presidential trips made by George W. Bush during 2007, the seventh year of his presidency as the 43rd president of the United States. International trips are highlighted in blue.

This list excludes trips made within Washington, D.C., the U.S. federal capital in which the White House, the official residence and principal workplace of the president, is located. It also excludes the capital's immediate surroundings in Maryland and Virginia, such as Andrews Air Force Base in Maryland, where the president typically boards Air Force One for all trips outside the area. Also excluded are trips to Camp David, the country residence of the president, and to the Bush family's Prairie Chapel Ranch near Crawford and Walker's Point Estate in Kennebunkport, Maine.

== January ==
State or country	Areas visited	Dates	Details
Georgia	Fort Benning	January 11	Spoke to soldiers on the reconstruction of Iraq.
Delaware	Wilmington	January 24	Discussed the future of energy at the DuPont Building.
Missouri	Lee's Summit	January 25	Took questions on health care policy at Saint Luke's East Hospital.
Maryland	Cambridge	January 26	Addressed the House Republican Conference at the Hyatt Regency Chesapeake Bay.
Illinois	Peoria, East Peoria	January 30	Breakfast with local small-business owners. Toured headquarters of Caterpillar Inc.
New York	New York	January 31	Spoke on the national economy at Federal Hall National Memorial.

== February ==
State or country	Areas visited	Dates	Details
Virginia	Williamsburg	February 3	Spoke to the House Democratic Caucus Issues Conference at the Kingsmill Resort.
Virginia	Manassas	February 6	Toured Micron Technology offices.
Virginia	Luray	February 7	Spoke about National Parks Centennial Initiative at Shenandoah National Park.
Tennessee	Chattanooga	February 21	Took questions about health care policy at the Chattanooga Convention Center.
North Carolina	Franklinton	February 22	Toured a local Novozymes biotechnology facility.

== March ==
State or country	Areas visited	Dates	Details
Mississippi	Long Beach, Biloxi	March 1	Toured recovery efforts from Hurricane Katrina.
Louisiana	New Orleans	March 1	Toured recovery efforts from Hurricane Katrina. Visited Samuel J. Green Charter School.
Indiana	New Albany	March 2	Visited Silver Street Elementary School.
Kentucky	Louisville	March 2	Attended National Republican Senatorial Committee fundraising dinner for Mitch McConnell.
Alabama	Enterprise	March 3	Toured damage from the 2007 Enterprise tornado.
Brazil	São Paulo	March 8–9	Met with President Luiz Inácio Lula da Silva.
Uruguay	Montevideo	March 9–11	Met with President Tabaré Vázquez.
Colombia	Bogotá	March 11	Met with President Álvaro Uribe.
Guatemala	Guatemala City, Santa Cruz Balanyá, Iximche	March 11–12	Informal visit; met with President Óscar Berger; visited the Iximche archaeological site.
Mexico	Mérida, Uxmal	March 12–14	Met with President Felipe Calderón; visited the Uxmal archaeological site.
Kansas	Kansas City	March 20	Toured General Motors Fairfax Assembly & Stamping plant.
Missouri	Claycomo	March 20	Toured Ford Kansas City Assembly Plant.

== April ==
State or country	Areas visited	Dates	Details
California	Fort Irwin	April 4	Spoke to soldiers at the Fort Irwin National Training Center.
Texas	Fort Hood	April 8	Celebrated Easter Sunday with troops.
Arizona	Yuma	April 9	Viewed construction of Mexican border fencing under the Secure Fence Act of 2006.
Virginia	Blacksburg	April 17	Addressed Virginia Tech students at a memorial convocation at Cassell Coliseum, following the Virginia Tech shooting the previous day.
Ohio	Tipp City	April 19	Visited Tippecanoe High School.
Michigan	East Grand Rapids	April 20	Addressed a local chapter of the World Affairs Councils of America.
New York	New York	April 24	Spoke at the Harlem Village Academy Charter School.
Florida	Kendall	April 28	Gave the commencement address at Miami Dade College's Kendall Campus.

== May ==
State or country	Areas visited	Dates	Details
Florida	Tampa	May 1	Spoke at MacDill Air Force Base.
Kansas	Greensburg	May 9	Toured damage from the Greensburg tornado five days earlier.
Pennsylvania	Latrobe	May 11	Gave the commencement address at Saint Vincent College.
Virginia	Williamsburg	May 13	Celebrated the 400th anniversary of the foundation of Jamestown colony.
Connecticut	New London	May 23	Gave the commencement address at the United States Coast Guard Academy.
Georgia	Brunswick, Glynco	May 29	Toured damage from the Bugaboo Fire. Visited the local Federal Law Enforcement Training Center.
New Jersey	Edison	May 30	Spoke to New Jersey Republican Committee.

== June ==
State or country	Areas visited	Dates	Details
Czech Republic	Prague	June 4–5	Met with President Václav Klaus and Prime Minister Mirek Topolánek. Addressed Conference on Democracy and Security.
Germany	Heiligendamm	June 5–8	Attended the 33rd G8 summit. Met with Chinese President Hu Jintao.
Poland	Gdańsk, Jurata	June 8	Met with President Lech Kaczyński.
Italy	Rome	June 8–10	Met with President Giorgio Napolitano and Prime Minister Romano Prodi.
Vatican City	Apostolic Palace	June 9	Audience with Pope Benedict XVI.
Albania	Tirana	June 10	Met with President Alfred Moisiu and Prime Minister Sali Berisha, becoming the first U.S. president to visit the country.
Bulgaria	Sofia	June 10–11	Met with President Georgi Parvanov and Prime Minister Sergei Stanishev.
Kansas	Wichita	June 15	Visited the Boys & Girls Club of South Central Kansas.
Alabama	Athens, Mobile	June 21	Spoke on energy at the Browns Ferry Nuclear Plant. Attended a fundraising reception for Jeff Sessions in 2008 Senate election.
Rhode Island	Newport	June 28	Spoke at the Naval War College.

== July ==
State or country	Areas visited	Dates	Details
West Virginia	Martinsburg	July 4	Celebrated Independence Day at West Virginia Air National Guard hangar.
Ohio	Parma, Cleveland	July 10	Toured a local GrafTech International Ltd. manufacturing facility. Addressed the Greater Cleveland Partnership.
Tennessee	Nashville	July 19	Visited a local business, Nashville Bun Company. Took questions at Gaylord Opryland Resort & Convention Center.
South Carolina	Charleston	July 24	Spoke to troops at Charleston Air Force Base.
Pennsylvania	Philadelphia	July 26	Addressed an American Legislative Exchange Council summit.

== August ==
State or country	Areas visited	Dates	Details
Minnesota	Minneapolis	August 4	Toured the site of the I-35W Mississippi River bridge, which had collapsed three days earlier.
Canada	Montebello	August 20–21	Attended North American Leaders' Summit with Prime Minister Stephen Harper and Mexican president Felipe Calderón.
Minnesota	Minneapolis	August 21	Spoke about ongoing replacement of the I-35W Mississippi River bridge at the Minneapolis/St. Paul Air Reserve Station.
Missouri	Riverside, Kansas City	August 22	Addressed the Veterans of Foreign Wars National Convention.
Washington	Bellevue	August 27	Attended a fundraising reception for David G. Reichert for 2008 House campaign.
Nevada	Reno	August 28	Addressed the American Legion National Convention.
Louisiana	New Orleans	August 29	Toured recovery efforts on the second anniversary of Hurricane Katrina.
Mississippi	Bay St. Louis	August 29	Toured recovery efforts on the second anniversary of Hurricane Katrina.

== September ==
State or country	Areas visited	Dates	Details
Iraq	Al Asad Airbase	September 3	Met with Gen. David Petraeus, Secretary of State Condoleezza Rice, Secretary of Defense Robert Gates, senior U.S. officials, Iraqi political leaders. Addressed U.S military personnel.
Australia	Sydney	September 3–8	Attended the APEC Australia 2007 summit.
Hawaii	Honolulu	September 8	Visited wounded troops at Hickam Air Force Base during stopover on return from APEC summit.
New York	New York	September 24–26	Addressed 62nd United Nations General Assembly.

== October ==
State or country	Areas visited	Dates	Details
Pennsylvania	West Hempfield Township	October 3	Toured a local business, Jay Group, Inc.
Maryland	Emmitsburg	October 7	Visited the National Fallen Firefighters Memorial.
Florida	Miami	October 12	Spoke at the Radisson Miami Hotel.
Arkansas	Rogers	October 15	Toured a local business, Stribling Packaging, Inc. Took questions on the 2008 United States federal budget at the John Q. Hammons Convention Center.
Maryland	St. Michaels	October 20	Signed Executive Order 13449, Protection of Striped Bass and Red Drum Fish Populations.
California	San Diego, Escondido	October 25	Toured areas damaged by the October 2007 California wildfires.

== November ==
State or country	Areas visited	Dates	Details
South Carolina	Fort Jackson	November 2	Addressed a basic training graduation ceremony
Texas	San Antonio	November 8	Visited wounded troops at Brooke Army Medical Center.
Indiana	New Albany	November 13	Toured a local business, Sam's Tavern. Spoke on the federal budget at The Grand.
Virginia	Charles City	November 19	Visited Berkeley Plantation, said to have been the site of the first Thanksgiving in 1619
Maryland	Annapolis	November 27	Hosted the Annapolis Conference, a peace negotiation between President of the Palestinian National Authority Mahmoud Abbas and Prime Minister of Israel Ehud Olmert.
Maryland	Mount Airy	November 30	Observed World AIDS Day at Calvary United Methodist Church.

== December ==
State or country	Areas visited	Dates	Details
Nebraska	Omaha	December 5	Campaigned for Mike Johanns for 2008 Senate election at Eppley Airfield. Spoke on health care at OneWorld Community Health Center.
Virginia	Fredericksburg	December 17	Took questions on the national economy at the local Rotary International club.
