= Saint Luke's Northland Hospital =

Saint Luke's Northland Hospital can refer to several hospitals including:

- Saint Luke's North Hospital–Barry Road
- Saint Luke's North Hospital–Smithville
