= Oswego High School =

Oswego High School may refer to one of several high schools in the United States:

- Oswego High School (New York)
- Oswego Junior Senior High School (Kansas)
- Oswego East High School, Oswego, Illinois
- Oswego High School (Illinois)
- Lake Oswego High School, Oregon
