= K67 =

K67 or K-67 may refer to:

- K-67 (Kansas highway), a state highway in Kansas
- K67 kiosk, modular kiosk design from Yugoslavia
- HMS Snowdrop (K67), a UK Royal Navy ship
- Oswego Municipal Airport, Kansas, United States (ICAO, FAA code: K67)
