= Oswego Public Library (disambiguation) =

Oswego Public Library is a library in Oswego, Kansas

Oswego Public Library may also refer to:

- Oswego City Library, a historic place in Oswego County, New York
- Oswego Public Library, a library in Oswego, Illinois
