= Oswego, Kansas =

City in Labette County, Kansas

- City and County seat
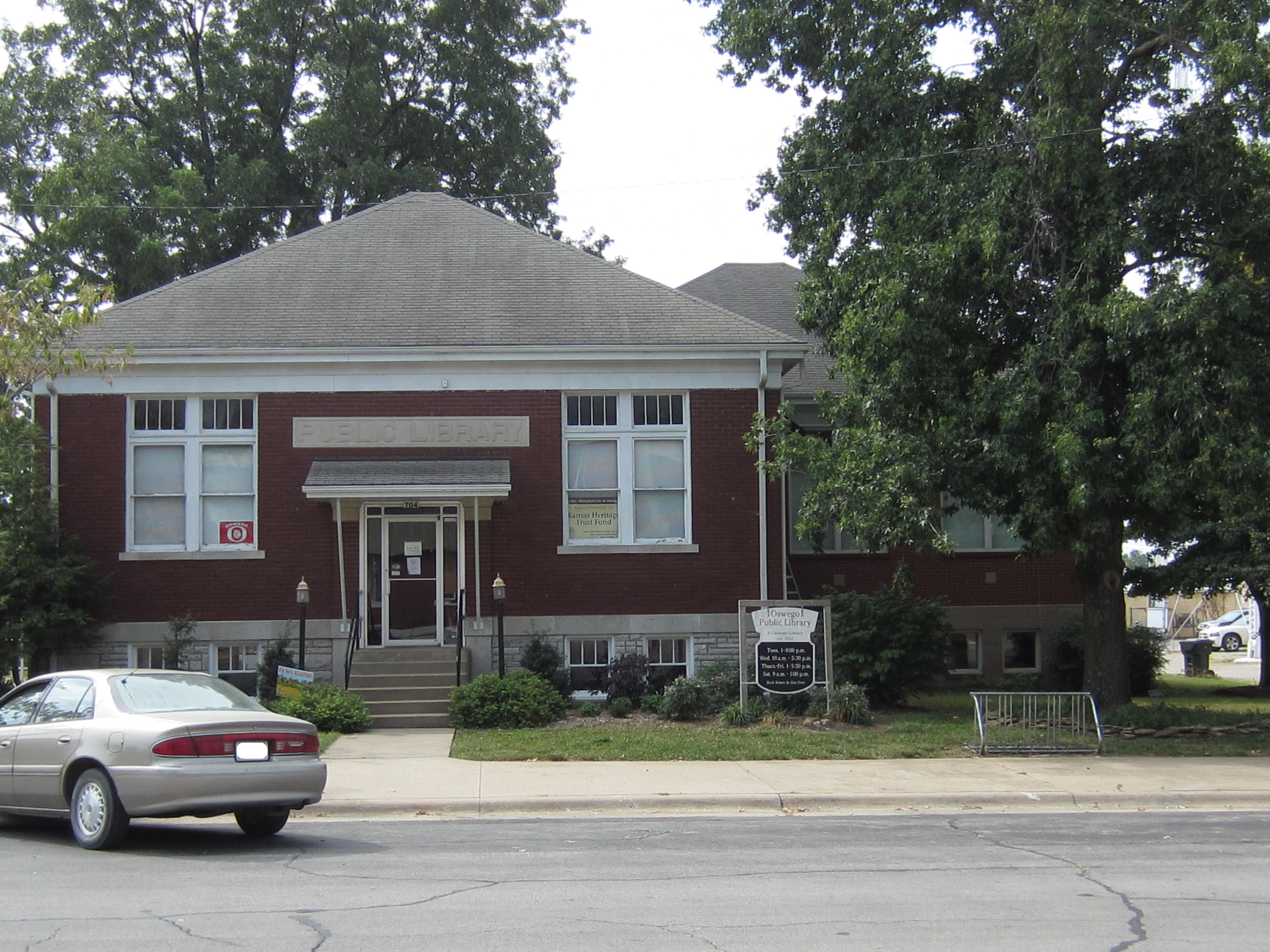
- Oswego Carnegie Library (2013)

- Location within Labette County and Kansas

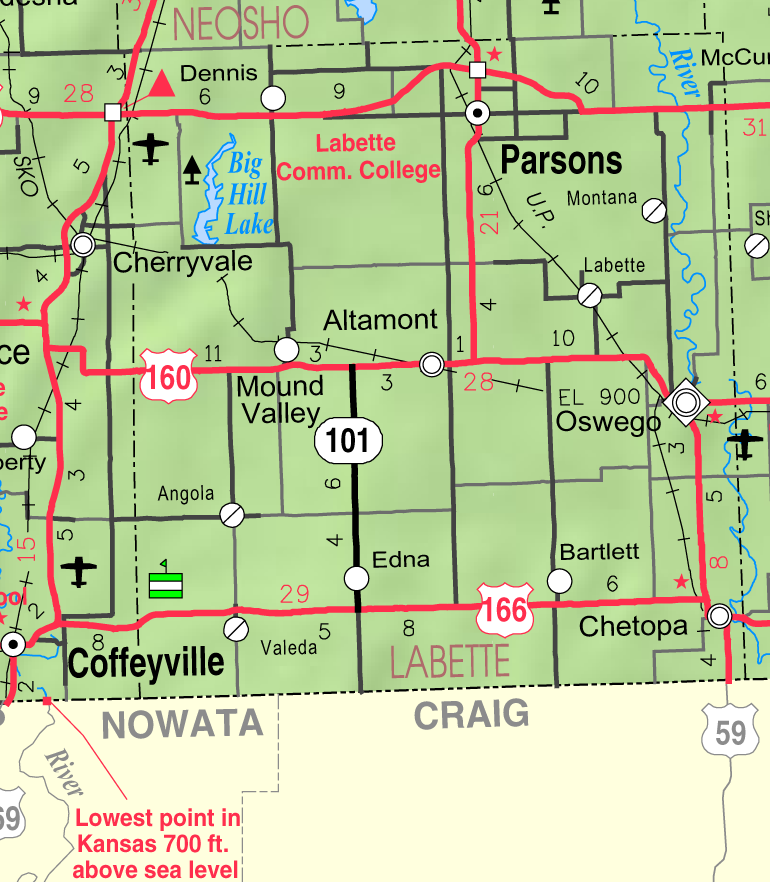
- KDOT map of Labette County (legend)
- Coordinates: 37°10′4″N 95°6′34″W
- Country: United States
- State: Kansas
- County: Labette
- Founded: 1865
- Incorporated: 1867
- Named for: Oswego, New York

Government
  - Type: Mayor–Council
  - Mayor: Bill Cunningham

Area
  - Total: 2.47 sq mi (6.40 km^{2})
  - Land: 2.41 sq mi (6.24 km^{2})
  - Water: 0.066 sq mi (0.17 km^{2})
- Elevation: 912 ft (278 m)

Population (2020)
  - Total: 1,668
  - Density: 692/sq mi (267/km^{2})
- Time zone: UTC-6 (CST)
  - Summer (DST): UTC-5 (CDT)
- ZIP Code: 67356
- Area code: 620
- FIPS code: 20-53450
- GNIS ID: 469468
- Website: oswegokansas.com

Oswego is a city in and the county seat of Labette County, Kansas, United States, and situated along the Neosho River. As of the 2020 census, the population of the city was 1,668.

== History ==
Oswego is located on the site of an Osage village called No tse Wa spe, which means "Heart Stays" or more loosely translated, "Quiet Heart." Jesuit Missionaries from Osage Mission (now St. Paul, Kansas) who worked among the Osages called the village "Little Town," probably because the band of Osages who lived in the village were of the "Little Osage" division of the Osage People. More specifically, the Osage Village of Little Town was described as "Little Town Above" by the Jesuits, to distinguish it from another village, which was sometimes located just to the east of Little Town, called "Little Town Below." While Osage villages were moved quite often (according to weather, hunting conditions, and sanitary conditions) Little Town Above was generally located on the bluff overlooking the Neosho River, where Oswego sits today. Little Town Below often sat near Horseshoe Lake, in the Neosho River Valley about a mile due east of Oswego. During the 1850s, Little Town was often referred to as "White Hair's Town," in honor of a resident of the village named Iron Hawk. Iron Hawk was named Grand Tsi Shu Chief (or Peace Chief) of the Osage Nation (through the 19th Century, it was traditional for the Osage Chief to take the name "White Hair".)

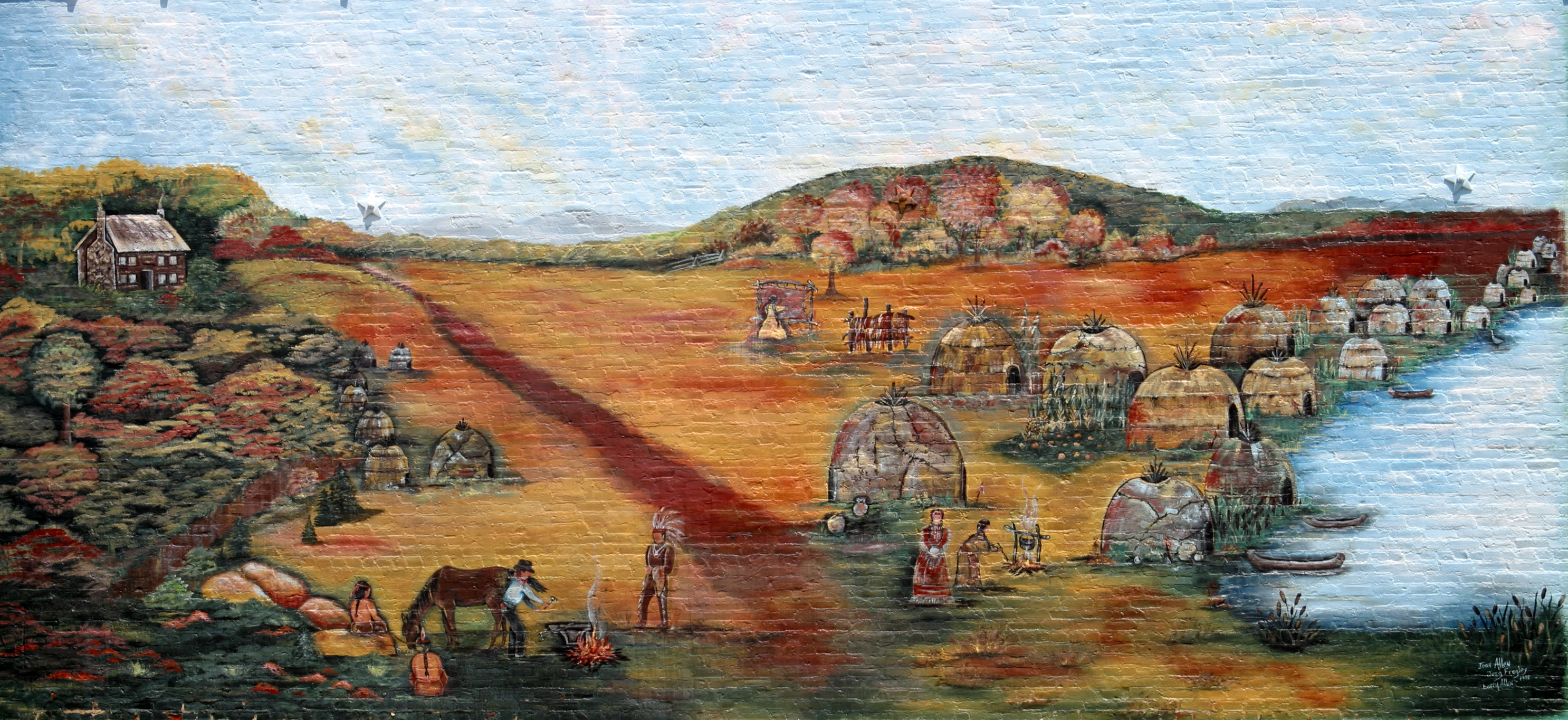
Several murals can be found around the city. The most famous is this reproduction of E. Marie Horner's "The Village of White Hair" depicting the relationship between white trader John Mathews and the Osage, led by Chief White Hair.

A study of the baptismal records of the Jesuits at Osage Mission reveals that several white or mixed white and Osage families lived in or near Little Town before the Civil War. Several mixed white and Cherokee families also lived in or near the present site of Little Town, likely just east of the village in the Cherokee Neutral Lands or to the south, near Chetopa.

One family of mixed Osage blood that lived at Little Town before the Civil War was the John Allen Mathews family, who operated a blacksmith/gunsmith shop on the site and ran a trading post here, as well as one at Osage Mission and one at Fort Gibson. Mathews first purchased the trading post at Little Town from Augustus Chouteau in either 1838 or 1843, depending upon the source. Mathews was married to Mary Ann Williams until her death and then to her sister Sarah Jane Williams, daughters of William Sherley Williams, better known as "Old Bill Williams" and his Osage wife, A-Ci'n-Ga or Wind Blossom.

Mathews was a slaveholder from Kentucky, as evidenced by the baptismal records of the Osage Mission. Before the Civil War, Mathews was involved in driving off settlers from the adjacent Cherokee Neutral Lands and in stirring Southern sympathies among Native Americans living on the frontier. Early in the spring of 1861, Mathews was commissioned a captain in the Confederate Army and given orders to organize a company of soldiers from among sympathetic Native Americans, specifically, the Quapaw. In June 1861, he held a meeting at the house of Larkin McGhee in the nearby Osage village of Chetopa and organized a company of Osages and mixed-blood Cherokees for the Confederate Army. One of his sons, John Mathews, Jr. joined this company. September 8, 1861, Mathews led another company, this one made up of Osages, mixed-blooded Osages and Cherokees, and border ruffians. This second company raided and looted Humboldt, Kansas, capturing no less than a dozen freed slaves. James Lane put a $1000.00 bounty on the head of Mathews, who was soon betrayed by a man who worked at his ranch. The man helped James G. Blunt and the Kansas 6th Volunteer Cavalry (and the Humboldt Home Guard) track down Mathews. He was killed at the house of William Blythe, rented by Lewis Rogers, just southeast of Chetopa on the Cherokee Neutral Lands.

The next day, local residents were tried by James G. Blunt in an impromptu court martial. Mathews' ranch and trading post at Little Town were subsequently burned. The ranch had consisted of a two story double log cabin (covered with burr siding and sporting plastered walls), a blacksmith shop, a stable, slaves quarters, a well house, a smoke house, a woodshed, and other outbuildings, as well as two race tracks. He had title to 100 acres (0.40 km^{2}) on the bluff and 30 acres (120,000 m^{2}) below. He had no less than 100 head of cattle and 50 horses. His possessions and the stock of the trading post (including 50 buffalo robes and six bear skins) were distributed among the volunteers who had tracked him down. Little Town and many houses at Chetopa were also burned. The site of Little Town remained unoccupied by whites during the war. Most, but not all, of the Osages fled Kansas during the Civil War. Mathews's own children fled to Texas and Kentucky.

In 1865, a number of settlers located at this point and called the town "Little Town." Two years later, the Oswego town company was organized and so named for Oswego, New York, whence many of the settlers had come. Lots were given away to every person who would erect a building, with the result that the town grew very rapidly. The organization of Oswego as a city of the third class took place in February 1870. The town was made a city of the second class by proclamation of the governor in 1880.

The first frame house was put up by Dr. William S. Newlon in September 1865. The first frame store building was erected by Thomas J. Buntain, though the first store was opened in a log building in 1865 by Rexford & Elsbee. The post office was established in 1867 with Nelson Carr as postmaster. At that time, there were two provision stores, since Oswego was on the military road. M. George had opened a blacksmith shop and D.W. Clover a hotel, which was not only an inn for the public, but the county headquarters, a political rendezvous and a news center. This was the second hotel, the first having been built in 1866 by William A. Hogaboom. In 1868, Mr. Shanks operated the first pottery and made several kilns of stoneware; a cotton gin was set up the same year. The first bank was opened in 1868 by W. M. Johnson, who was forced two years later to make an assignment of all that he had to satisfy his creditors. The second bank was started in July 1870 by B. F. Hibart and H. L. Taylor, which was a success. The State Bank of Oswego started business a few weeks later, but discontinued after a short time, as there was not business enough for two banks. In September 1870, a steam sawmill was erected by Macon, Krell & Cowell.

The first newspaper was the Oswego Register, established in 1868 by E.R. Trask. The first church was the Congregational, organized in May 1868; the Presbyterian church was founded in July of the same year. The first school was opened in 1867. The public library association was organized in 1877 and continues in the form of Oswego Public Library, a Carnegie Library, today. The telephone system was put into operation in 1882, the waterworks in 1887, and the first electric lights were turned on July 12, 1888 (but were turned off a few months later).

In 2011, the City Council voted to annex city-owned Oswego Municipal Airport into the city limits, expanding Oswego into neighboring Cherokee County.

== Geography ==
Oswego is located approximately 12 miles (19 km) north of the Oklahoma state line and 30 miles (48 km) west of the Missouri line. It is situated along the southern bluffs overlooking the Neosho River valley at the junction of U.S. Route 59 and U.S. Route 160. According to the United States Census Bureau, the city has a total area of 2.30 square miles (5.96 km^{2}), of which 2.24 square miles (5.80 km^{2}) is land and 0.06 square miles (0.16 km^{2}) is water.

=== Climate ===
The climate in this area is characterized by hot, humid summers and generally mild to cool winters. According to the Köppen Climate Classification system, Oswego has a humid subtropical climate, abbreviated "Cfa" on climate maps.

Climate data for Oswego, Kansas, 1991–2020 normals, extremes 1981–present
Month	Jan	Feb	Mar	Apr	May	Jun	Jul	Aug	Sep	Oct	Nov	Dec	Year
Record high °F (°C)	74.3 (23.5)	82.2 (27.9)	93.8 (34.3)	91.6 (33.1)	91.3 (32.9)	100.4 (38.0)	107.0 (41.7)	108.7 (42.6)	105.5 (40.8)	93.4 (34.1)	83.9 (28.8)	78.0 (25.6)	108.7 (42.6)
Mean maximum °F (°C)	66.3 (19.1)	70.8 (21.6)	78.6 (25.9)	82.4 (28.0)	86.9 (30.5)	92.6 (33.7)	97.4 (36.3)	98.4 (36.9)	93.4 (34.1)	84.7 (29.3)	75.2 (24.0)	66.9 (19.4)	99.4 (37.4)
Mean daily maximum °F (°C)	43.3 (6.3)	48.5 (9.2)	58.2 (14.6)	67.6 (19.8)	75.8 (24.3)	84.9 (29.4)	89.7 (32.1)	89.4 (31.9)	81.6 (27.6)	70.2 (21.2)	57.5 (14.2)	46.6 (8.1)	67.8 (19.9)
Daily mean °F (°C)	33.4 (0.8)	37.8 (3.2)	47.1 (8.4)	56.6 (13.7)	66.0 (18.9)	75.2 (24.0)	79.7 (26.5)	78.6 (25.9)	70.5 (21.4)	58.8 (14.9)	46.8 (8.2)	36.9 (2.7)	57.3 (14.1)
Mean daily minimum °F (°C)	23.4 (−4.8)	27.2 (−2.7)	36.0 (2.2)	45.6 (7.6)	56.2 (13.4)	65.5 (18.6)	69.6 (20.9)	67.7 (19.8)	59.3 (15.2)	47.3 (8.5)	36.1 (2.3)	27.3 (−2.6)	46.8 (8.2)
Mean minimum °F (°C)	5.6 (−14.7)	10.4 (−12.0)	18.6 (−7.4)	29.7 (−1.3)	40.9 (4.9)	54.0 (12.2)	60.6 (15.9)	57.4 (14.1)	44.4 (6.9)	30.9 (−0.6)	20.1 (−6.6)	9.9 (−12.3)	1.3 (−17.1)
Record low °F (°C)	−11.8 (−24.3)	−15.4 (−26.3)	−0.6 (−18.1)	21.8 (−5.7)	33.2 (0.7)	44.6 (7.0)	51.9 (11.1)	47.9 (8.8)	29.8 (−1.2)	16.8 (−8.4)	8.5 (−13.1)	−16.1 (−26.7)	−16.1 (−26.7)
Average precipitation inches (mm)	1.69 (43)	1.83 (46)	3.20 (81)	4.86 (123)	7.06 (179)	5.52 (140)	4.09 (104)	3.98 (101)	4.51 (115)	3.87 (98)	2.91 (74)	2.33 (59)	45.85 (1,163)
Average precipitation days (≥ 0.01 in)	5.9	5.6	8.3	9.6	11.2	9.5	8.5	7.3	6.9	7.6	6.4	5.5	92.3
Source: PRISM

== Demographics ==
Historical population
Census	Pop.	Note	%±
1870	1,196		—
1880	2,531		111.6%
1890	2,574		1.7%
1900	2,208		−14.2%
1910	2,317		4.9%
1920	2,386		3.0%
1930	1,845		−22.7%
1940	1,953		5.9%
1950	1,997		2.3%
1960	2,027		1.5%
1970	2,200		8.5%
1980	2,218		0.8%
1990	1,870		−15.7%
2000	2,046		9.4%
2010	1,829		−10.6%
2020	1,668		−8.8%
U.S. Decennial Census

=== 2020 census ===
As of the 2020 census, Oswego had a population of 1,668, with 678 households and 427 families. The median age was 42.3 years. 23.0% of residents were under the age of 18, 7.6% were from 18 to 24, 22.3% were from 25 to 44, 24.8% were from 45 to 64, and 22.4% were 65 years of age or older. For every 100 females there were 101.2 males, and for every 100 females age 18 and over there were 96.2 males age 18 and over.

The population density was 692.7 per square mile (267.4/km^{2}). There were 797 housing units at an average density of 331.0 per square mile (127.8/km^{2}). Of all housing units, 14.9% were vacant; the homeowner vacancy rate was 3.3%, and the rental vacancy rate was 7.9%.

Of households, 26.3% had children under the age of 18 living in them. Of all households, 45.9% were married-couple households, 18.1% were households with a male householder and no spouse or partner present, and 27.3% were households with a female householder and no spouse or partner present. About 31.9% of all households were made up of individuals, and 17.5% had someone living alone who was 65 years of age or older.

0.0% of residents lived in urban areas, while 100.0% lived in rural areas.

Racial composition as of the 2020 census
Race	Number	Percent
White	1,441	86.4%
Black or African American	27	1.6%
American Indian and Alaska Native	44	2.6%
Asian	2	0.1%
Native Hawaiian and Other Pacific Islander	3	0.2%
Some other race	19	1.1%
Two or more races	132	7.9%
Hispanic or Latino (of any race)	66	4.0%

Non-Hispanic White residents were 84.83% of the population.

=== Demographic estimates ===
The average household size was 2.1 and the average family size was 2.7. The percent of those with a bachelor's degree or higher was estimated to be 12.8% of the population.

=== Income and poverty ===
The 2016–2020 5-year American Community Survey estimates show that the median household income was $42,237 (with a margin of error of +/- $5,158) and the median family income was $48,333 (+/- $8,546). Males had a median income of $36,065 (+/- $3,660) versus $21,083 (+/- $4,872) for females. The median income for those above 16 years old was $30,337 (+/- $3,138). Approximately, 5.5% of families and 9.8% of the population were below the poverty line, including 10.3% of those under the age of 18 and 9.0% of those ages 65 or over.

=== 2010 census ===
As of the census of 2010, there were 1,829 people, 763 households, and 476 families residing in the city. The population density was 816.5 inhabitants per square mile (315.3/km^{2}). There were 869 housing units at an average density of 387.9 per square mile (149.8/km^{2}). The racial makeup of the city was 91.3% White, 1.5% African American, 3.2% Native American, 0.1% Asian, 0.4% from other races, and 3.5% from two or more races. Hispanic or Latino of any race were 2.6% of the population.

There were 763 households, of which 32.0% had children under the age of 18 living with them, 46.4% were married couples living together, 12.3% had a female householder with no husband present, 3.7% had a male householder with no wife present, and 37.6% were non-families. 33.4% of all households were made up of individuals, and 19.8% had someone living alone who was 65 years of age or older. The average household size was 2.30 and the average family size was 2.90.

The median age in the city was 39.9 years. 24.2% of residents were under the age of 18; 9% were between the ages of 18 and 24; 23.5% were from 25 to 44; 23.7% were from 45 to 64; and 19.5% were 65 years of age or older. The gender makeup of the city was 49.6% male and 50.4% female.

== Education ==
=== Primary and secondary education ===
The community is served by Oswego USD 504 public school district with four schools, serves more than 500 students.

- Oswego Junior Senior High School, grades 7-12 (following a major expansion of the Tomahawk Trail campus, the former Oswego Middle School (grades 6-8) and the former Oswego High School (grades 9-12) were combined into a single attendance center serving grades 7-12).
- Service Valley Charter Academy, a public agricultural charter school, grades K–8
- Neosho Heights Elementary School, grades PK–6

=== College ===
Parsons, Kansas-based Labette Community College holds classes on the Oswego High School site.

Pittsburg State University, an NCAA Division II school in the Kansas Board of Regents system, is located approximately thirty miles away in nearby Pittsburg, Kansas.

=== Museums ===
The Oswego Historical Museum and Genealogy Department, owned by the Oswego Historical Society, Inc., offers guided museum tours featuring period-style theme rooms, genealogical research, and tours of an original log cabin, a partially reconstructed building original to the Oswego townsite.

=== Libraries ===
Each of the USD 504 building sites includes a library for student access. These school libraries provided extended services such as inter-library loan through Southeast Kansas Library System and access to Internet2 and online databases through Kan-ed, a service sponsored by the State of Kansas.

The community of Oswego is served by the Oswego Public Library (OPL), a Carnegie Library. OPL offers a vast collection of books, DVDs, periodicals, audio books, and videos. Internet access is also available through the use of patron-access computers or the Library's free Wi-Fi access.

== Medical ==
Until 2019, Oswego was served by Oswego Community Hospital (OCH), a twelve-bed Critical Access hospital administered by HMC/CAH, Inc. and supported by Via Christi Hospital (Pittsburg) of Pittsburg, Kansas and Labette Health of Parsons. OCH had a contractual agreement with Eagle-Med to provide Air Ambulance services to any local or regional hospital.

On February 13, 2019, Oswego Community Hospital abruptly closed its doors, "citing [a] failure to expand Medicaid" and "low patient volumes." However, later in 2019, then-Kansas Attorney General Derek Schmidt announced his office had executed a search warrant as part of a broader investigation of the hospital's operator, EmpowerHMS. In June 2020, federal indictments were unsealed, revealing that several persons associated with EmpowerHMS were indicted by the U.S. Department of Justice for their alleged role in a $1.4 billion fraudulent billing scheme. In April 2020, the hospital's assets, including the former hospital site, a former clinic location, and other real estate, were purchased out of bankruptcy by Oswego NeuroPsych Hospital, Inc.

Labette Health of Parsons, in conjunction with the Labette County Health Department, provides emergency ambulatory services to the hospital best-qualified to treat each patient.

Labette Health and Via Christi Hospital of Pittsburg, Kansas provide the closest Level III Trauma Centers, the only two emergency rooms to achieve Level III rating in the State of Kansas.

Two Level II Trauma Centers, Mercy Hospital Joplin and Freeman Health System, are located approximately thirty-five miles away in the regional hub of Joplin, Missouri, while the closest Level I Trauma Centers are in Tulsa, Oklahoma.

== Recreation ==
Oswego is home to five city-maintained parks.

- Riverside Park
- Schmoker Park
- John Mathews Park (Little Town Well)
- Hobart Young Park
- Thomas Park (Log Cabin)

=== Riverside Park ===
Riverside Park is Oswego's flagship park property. Located on 80 acres (320,000 m^{2}) near the north boundary of the city, Riverside Park overlooks the 100-foot (30 m) bluff that defines Oswego. It is home to the Labette County Fairgrounds, the 10,000-square-foot (930 m^{2}) Oswego Community Center, the historic Oswego City Pool, shelter houses, walking trails, RV campgrounds, and playground equipment. Riverside Park also includes tennis courts, horseshoe pits, and two baseball/softball fields, as well as ample parking.

Many of the stone structures were built in the 1930s as part of a series of State of Kansas public works employment projects.

==== Oswego City Pool ====
Built in 1935 to service the entire Southeast Kansas region, Oswego City Pool continues to serve the citizens of Oswego using its historic facilities. In the late 2000s, the National Park Service provided a grant to the City of Oswego to replace the concrete deck surrounding the pool, as well as the protective chain link fence. Work was also done to replace the aging diving board stands and water slide.

==== Oswego Community Center ====
Built in 2006 as part of Community Development Grant funded through the Kansas Department of Commerce, the 10,000-square-foot (930 m^{2}) facility plays host to a number of community events, including weddings, county fair exhibits, and community luncheons.

==== Labette County Fairgrounds ====
Encompassing the southern portion of Riverside Park, the Labette County Fairgrounds are host to many barns, exhibit halls, and Memorial Stadium. The Stadium was once used by the Oswego High School football program, and now used for the Fair's demolition derby.

=== Oswego Golf Course ===
Located just north of Oswego on U.S. Highway 59, Oswego Golf Course provides a nine-hole green. It was featured on television in 2006 by Jim Huber when PGA on Tour visited the course.

== Media ==
Labette Avenue is a weekly paper that covers mostly local stories and events. The newspaper is a continuation of the historic Oswego Independent and other local weekly newspapers. Labette Avenue is based in Oswego and serves the rural areas of Labette County, Kansas.

The daily Parsons Sun, of nearby Parsons, Kansas, also covers Oswego. The nearest major newspaper is the Joplin Globe.

Oswego is located in the Joplin-Pittsburg broadcast market area and receives the majority of its television and radio signals from those two cities. KGGF 690 AM Coffeyville covers SE Kansas and Broadcasts from its tower site in Mound Valley.

== Transportation ==
=== Rail ===
Oswego is served by the Union Pacific Railroad and the South Kansas and Oklahoma Railroad, a shortline railroad operating on former Frisco Railway trackage that provides direct connections to BNSF Railway and the Kansas City Southern Railway.

=== Road ===
U.S. Federal Highways U.S. 160 and U.S. 59 meet in Oswego. The city is located approximately 35 miles (56 km) from Interstate 44.

=== Air ===
Oswego Municipal Airport, located approximately 3 miles (4.8 km) outside the central business district, serves the general aviation needs of Oswego and the surrounding area. Fuel is available for purchase on-site.

== Notable people ==
- Arthur Evans, third president of Henry Kendall College and then the second president of the University of Oklahoma.
- Candy Loving, model and Playboy Playmate of the Month for January 1979, born in Oswego.
- Bishop Perkins, United States Representative and Senator.
- Carson Robison, country music singer and songwriter.
- William Steel, father of Crater Lake National Park in Oregon, his family lived on a farm near Oswego.

== See also ==
- Great Flood of 1951
