= Mariano Valdés Chávarri =

Spanish cardiologist and academic (1947–2021)

- Born: 1947; Madrid, Spain
- Died: 27 February 2021 (aged 74); El Palmar, Spain
- Occupation: Cardiologist

Mariano Valdés Chávarri (1947 – 27 February 2021) was a Spanish cardiologist and academic.

== Biography ==
Born in Madrid, Chávarri spent 35 years teaching in Murcia. He earned a doctoral degree in medicine from the University of Valencia and was the first to launch an angioplasty program in Spain for the treatment of myocardial infarction. He completed his training in internal medicine at the University of Valencia Hospital and in various American institutions, such as the Mid America Heart Institute, Menorah Medical Center, and the Bethany Medical Center, all in Kansas City, Missouri and Kansas City, Kansas.

Back in Spain, Chávarri served as chair of the pathology department at the University of Murcia and was head of the cardiology service department at the Hospital Clínico Universitario Virgen de la Arrixaca. He retired in 2017 but continued private practice until his death.

Mariano Valdés Chávarri died of COVID-19 during the COVID-19 pandemic in Spain in El Palmar on 27 February 2021, at the age of 74.
