= Olathe (disambiguation) =

Olathe is a city in Kansas and a large suburb of Kansas City.

Olathe may also refer to:

- Olathe, Colorado
- Olathe Township, Johnson County, Kansas
- Olathe Medical Center, in Olathe, Kansas
- Olathe School District, in Olathe, Kansas
- The Olathe News
- Naval Air Station Olathe, in Gardner, Kansas
