= AdventHealth Shawnee Mission =

- AdventHealth

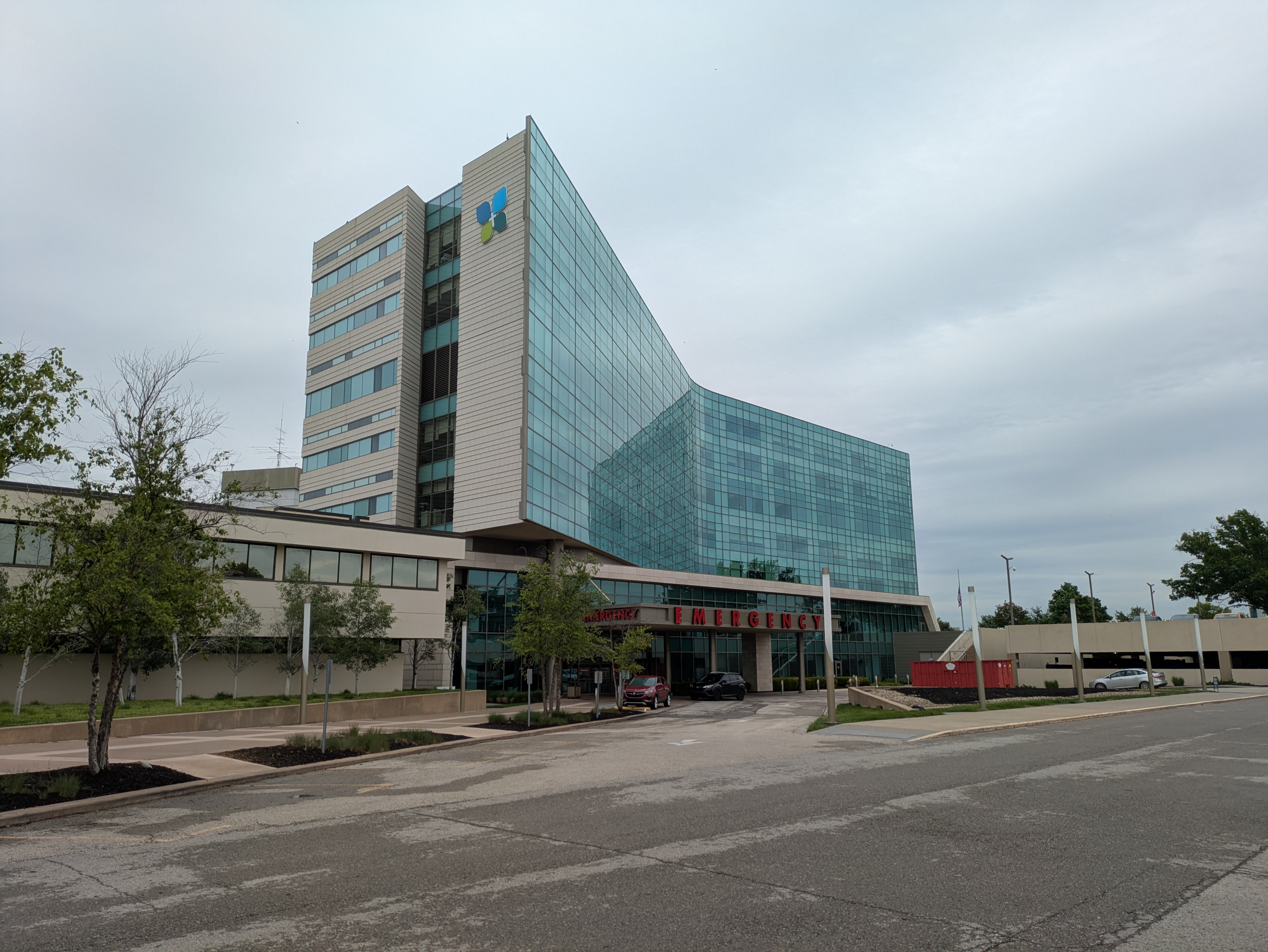
- Emergency department entrance in 2026

Geography
- Location: 9100 West 74th Street, Merriam, Kansas, United States
- Coordinates: 38°59′42″N 94°41′29″W

Organization
- Care system: Private hospital
- Type: General hospital and Teaching Hospital
- Religious affiliation: Seventh-day Adventist Church

Services
- Standards: Joint Commission
- Emergency department: Yes
- Beds: 504

Helipads
- Helipad: Aeronautical chart and airport information for 9KS2 at SkyVector

History
- Former names: Shawnee Mission Hospital; Shawnee Mission Medical Center
- Opened: May 1962

Links
- Website: www.adventhealth.com/hospital/adventhealth-shawnee-mission
- Lists: Hospitals in Kansas

Shawnee Mission Medical Center, Inc. (doing business as AdventHealth Shawnee Mission) is a non-profit hospital campus in Merriam in Johnson County, Kansas, United States owned by AdventHealth. The medical facility is a tertiary, psychiatric hospital, and teaching hospital that has multiple specialties. The hospital operates facilities in Lenexa, Olathe, Overland Park and Shawnee. It became part of Adventist Health System Sunbelt Healthcare Corporation in November 2002.

== History ==
=== 1955-1996 ===
In 1955, local leaders, medical professionals from the Johnson County Medical Society, and members of the New Haven Seventh-day Adventist Church in Overland Park, Kansas, came together to address the developing population's healthcare needs in Johnson County. J. C. Nichols donated land by Interstate 35 to the church for a medical facility. In 1961, the 102-bed nursing home, Pleasantview Health and Vocation Institute opened, later the facility was known as Shawnee Mission Health Center. In May 1962, the church opened Shawnee Mission Hospital with 65 acute care beds and two operating theaters. In 1966, an additional 70 acute-care beds, as well as more space for expanded diagnostic and therapeutic services were added.

In 1971, Shawnee Mission Hospital was renamed Shawnee Mission Medical Center, and increased the number of beds to 187. In 1972, ownership of the hospital was transferred to the Seventh-day Adventist Church, and it was placed under the direction of the Central (now Mid-America) Union Conference. The bed count at the time was 241, and due to the urgent need for acute care, these beds were converted to acute care beds in January 1975. By 1982, the total number of acute care beds had risen to 383. New maternity, cardiac care, women's services, and outpatient facilities were added in 1991 and 1992. In 1996, Shawnee Mission Medical Center became affiliated with Saint Luke's Health System.

=== 2002-2014 ===
On November 1, 2002, Shawnee Mission Medical Center split from Saint Luke's and became a part of the Altamonte Springs, Florida-based Adventist Health System.

In 2008, construction workers began building a $114 million, eight-story patient tower that added 265,000 square foot (24,600 m^{2}), it would include a new emergency department, coronary care unit (CCU), intensive care unit (ICU), surgery floor, and main entrance. The emergency department was tripled in size and capacity, and four operating theaters were added. In late January 2009, the patient tower opened and the last two floors were completed in early March 2011 for $20 million.

In early December 2011, construction workers began building a 90,000 square foot (8,400 m^{2}) birthing center to replace the older birth center on the hospital campus. On February 27, 2013, there was a grand opening of the new Shawnee Mission Birth Center, which tripled the size of the previous birth center. It opened to patients the next day. A 24-bed Level III Neonatal Intensive Care Unit (NICU) with private, single-family rooms was included in the expansion. In early April 2013, construction began on the ground floor of the Santa Fe medical office building for a $5.5 million outpatient cancer center. In January 2014, the Shawnee Mission Cancer Center opened to patients, it offered oncology, infusion therapy and radiation therapy. On March 12, Shawnee Mission Medical Center announced that their network of facilities would adopt the name of Shawnee Mission Health.

=== 2015-2025 ===
On June 22, 2015, construction workers began to renovate the cafeteria at Shawnee Mission Medical Center for $25 million, it was expected to be completed in the fall of 2016. Another $10 million would be spent to update equipment.

On March 22, 2016, the foundation of Shawnee Mission Health started a philanthropy campaign to raise $15 million for the B.E. Smith Family Center. Doug and Nan Smith were the first to give a grant for the construction of the new family center. On June 7, 2017, a grant of $1 million was donated by the Hall Family Foundation for the new family center. On March 22, 2018, construction workers started building the B. E. Smith Family Center on the hospital campus. On August 6, 2018, there was a topping out for the family center. On April 30, 2019, the 62 square foot (5.8 m^{2}) building opened to house its Britain Development programs for children with developmental disabilities and Early Learning programs for children of employees at AdventHealth Shawnee Mission. The building is the first in the world to have the Variety KC Compass harness system.

On November 15, 2017, Shawnee Mission Health became the 17th member of MD Anderson Cancer Network, and it became the first in Kansas. It remained affiliated until 2023, when MD Anderson ended its Certified Member program.

On January 2, 2019, Shawnee Mission Health rebranded to AdventHealth Shawnee Mission.

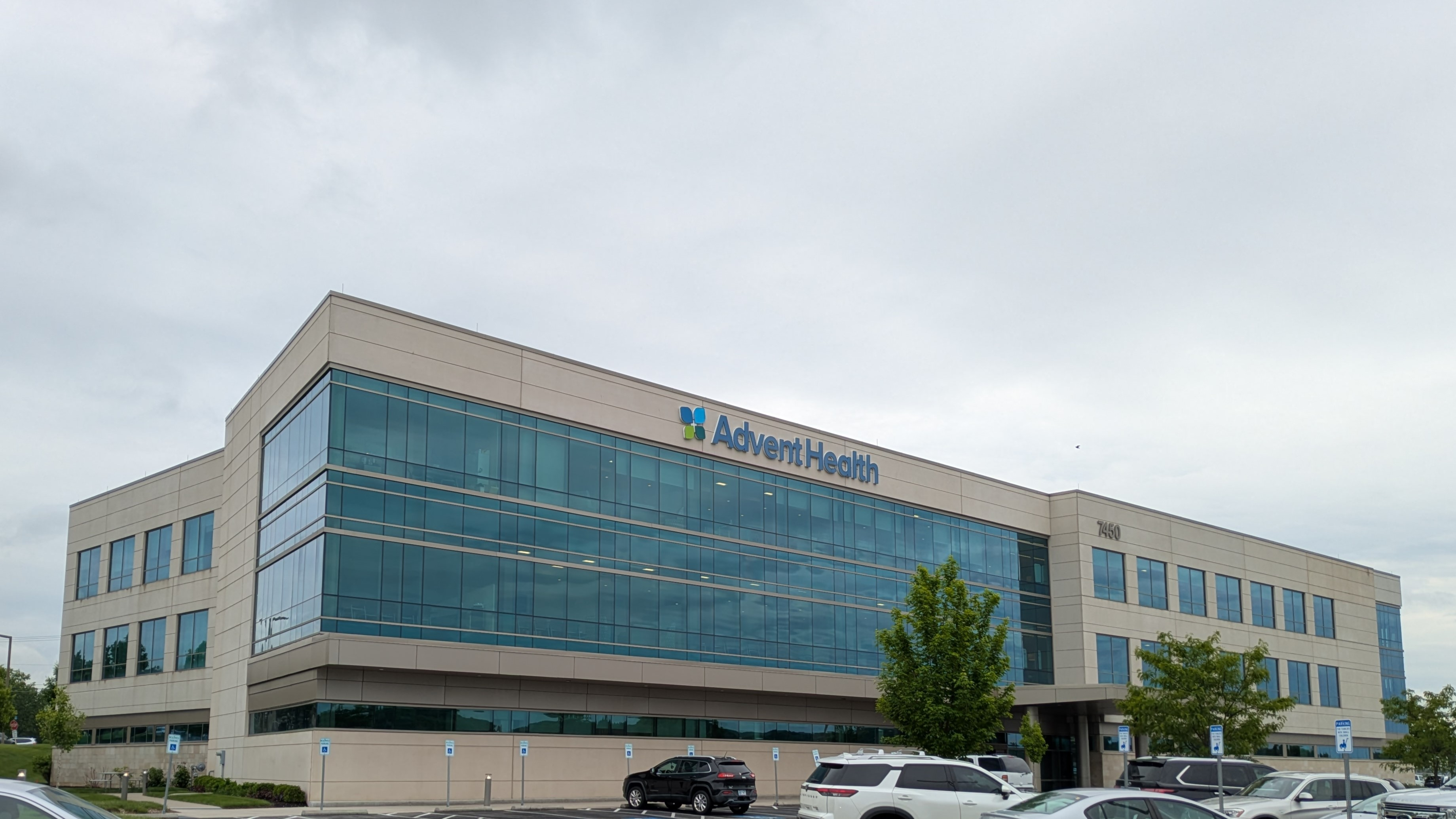
Gateway Medical Office Building

On January 1, 2021, all hospitals were required to have their chargemaster on its website by the Centers for Medicare & Medicaid. By late August, AdventHealth Shawnee Mission had failed to comply with the Hospital Price Transparency Law. It was not until July 28, 2023, that the hospital was in full compliance with the law.

In early 2022, AdventHealth Shawnee Mission began a two phase renovation project to update the original patient tower. The renovations cost over $30 million to renovate patient rooms, employee area, exteriors, waiting areas and lobby elevators. Renovations are expected to be completed in November 2023.

On May 5, 2022, AdventHealth Shawnee Mission announced their plans for a new three-story, 71,000 square foot (6,600 m^{2}) cancer center adjacent to the hospital to replace their older cancer center. They planned to demolish a two-story parking garage on campus for the new building. And planned for a new parking lot with 229 spaces. In late May, the Merriam City Council approved the plans for the new cancer center by the hospital. The new cancer center would cost $76.5 million to build and it will double the number of patients being treated. On July 18, demolition of the two-story parking garage began and the official groundbreaking of the cancer center was in October. On June 12, 2023, the cancer center was halfway completed, and in October of that year, the hospital was certified as a Comprehensive Cardiac Center by The Joint Commission. On May 2, 2024, there was a grand opening for the facility and on May 13, AdventHealth Cancer Institute Shawnee Mission began to treat patients. It is the only cancer center in the area that offers MRI-guided radiation therapy. The facility was designed by Hoefer Welker.

On August 20, 2025, it was announced that AdventHealth Cancer Institute Shawnee Mission became the first national affiliate of the University of Chicago Medicine Cancer Network.

== Lawsuits ==
In May 2025, AdventHealth Shawnee Mission sued Blue Cross and Blue Shield of Kansas City in Jackson County Circuit Court for $2 million, it is accusing them of wrongfully rejecting 350 medical diagnosis done by their physicians. The hospital claimed that the insurance providers use of AI has almost caused all of its appeals to be rejected. The hospital also accused the insurance providers criteria of being outdated and dubious in violation of state and federal law. On July 2, the lawsuit was moved to the United States District Court for the Western District of Missouri.

In late June 2025, a Johnson County jury awarded an Overland Park man $6.7 million, after he had filed a wrongful death claim against the hospital and two health care providers. Under state law that amount was reduced to $1,000,000. His wife committed suicide three days after leaving AdventHealth Shawnee Mission in April 2021.

== Off campus facilities ==
In 2007, Shawnee Mission Medical Center opened the Shawnee Mission Outpatient Pavilion in Lenexa, and in 2014 it was rebranded to Shawnee Mission Health Prairie Star. In 2019, it was rebranded to AdventHealth Lenexa, currently the facility goes by the name AdventHealth Prairie Star, due to AdventHealth Lenexa City Center.

In 2015, Shawnee Mission Health and Centra Care began a partnership to open six urgent care centers, the first location that opened was in Overland Park in September. The second location opened in Lenexa. In early September 2016, the third location opened in Olathe, and a fourth location opened in Shawnee. The fifth and sixth locations never came to be.

On February 1, 2017, Shawnee Mission Health opened its outpatient pavilion Shawnee Mission Health-Overland Park on the south side of Overland Park. Later on October 7, 2021, AdventHealth South Overland Park opened on the site.

In 2018, Shawnee Mission Health hired Turner Construction to build a medical office building with an emergency department in Overland Park, Kansas. On February 11, 2020, AdventHealth College Boulevard ER opened for $35 million.

== Awards and recognitions ==
The hospital received a grade A from The Leapfrog Group from fall 2013 to May 2023, it received a grade B from November 2024 to May 2026. In late November 2017, Shawnee Mission Medical Center received the HIMSS Analytics Stage 7 Award for its electronic health record. AdventHealth Shawnee Mission received from the Centers for Medicare & Medicaid Services a five-star rating from 2020 to 2023.

== See also ==
- List of Seventh-day Adventist hospitals
