= Mercy Hospital Columbus =

- Mercy (healthcare organization)

Geography
- Location: Columbus, Kansas, United States
- Coordinates: 37°10′21″N 94°50′35″W

Organization
- Care system: Private
- Type: Critical access

Services
- Emergency department: 24-hour emergency department
- Beds: 18

History
- Opened: 1917

Links
- Website: https://www.mercy.net/practice/mercy-hospital-columbus
- Lists: Hospitals in Kansas

Mercy Hospital Columbus is an 18-bed critical access hospital located in Columbus, Kansas. The hospital is part of the Sisters of Mercy Health System and is affiliated with Mercy Hospital Joplin in nearby Joplin, Missouri.

== History ==
Originally known as Maude Norton Hospital, Mercy Hospital Columbus was founded in 1917 by William Norton and cared for its first patients in the Norton Mansion. In 1952, the Norton Mansion was replaced with a modern hospital facility, which served Columbus until 1967 when a new addition was constructed. In 1999, the hospital affiliated with St. John's Regional Medical Center (Missouri) and joined Catholic Health Initiatives, changing its name to St. John's Maude Norton Hospital. In 2009, the hospital followed St. John's to the Sisters of Mercy Health System. Mercy renamed the hospital Mercy Maude Norton Hospital in 2012, and in 2014, the hospital became Mercy Hospital Columbus.

== Current Services ==
Mercy Hospital Columbus operates a 24-hour emergency department and offers medical services in a variety of practice areas, including family medicine, home health and hospice, imaging, industrial medicine, laboratory testing, mammography, physical therapy, and respiratory therapy. The hospital also provides access to visiting clinics in several speciality areas, including cardiology, podiatry, and cardiac, thoracic, and vascular surgery.
