= Ascension Via Christi St. Francis =

- Ascension Via Christi Health
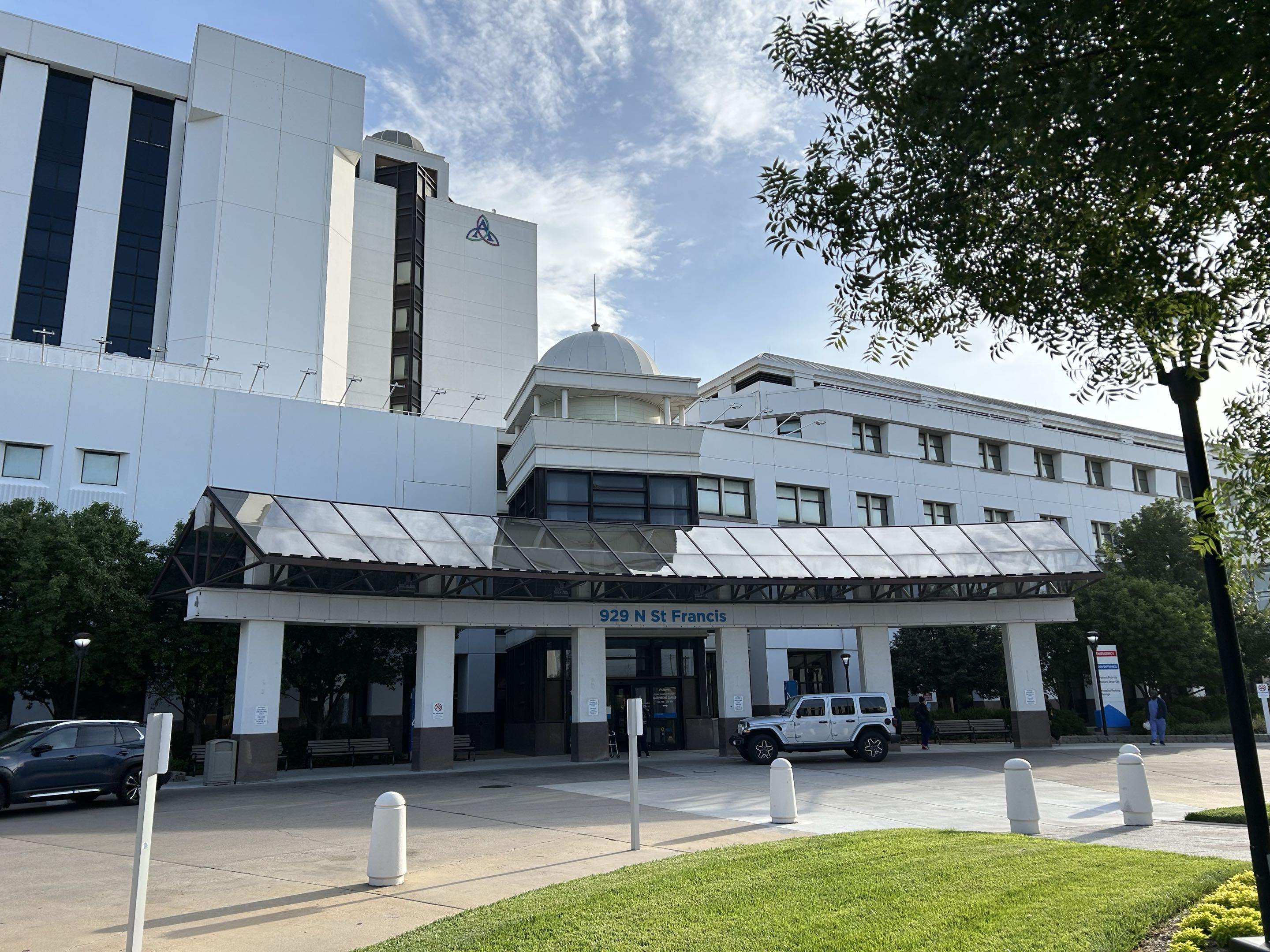
- Ascension Via Christi St. Francis in 2026

Geography
- Location: 929 St Francis, Wichita, Kansas, United States
- Coordinates: 37°41′56″N 97°19′55″W

Organization
- Religious affiliation: Catholic
- Affiliated university: Kansas City University; University of Kansas School of Medicine

Services
- Emergency department: Level I trauma center
- Beds: 421

Helipads
- Helipad: FAA LID: 22KS

History
- Opened: 1889

Links
- Website: healthcare.ascension.org/locations/kansas/kswic/wichita-ascension-via-christi-st-francis
- Lists: Hospitals in Kansas

Ascension Via Christi St. Francis is a non-profit, 421-bed teaching hospital in Wichita, Kansas owned and operated by Ascension Via Christi Health.

== History ==
In the 1880s, Mother M. Frances Streitel of the Sisters of the Sorrowful Mother in Rome, Italy began sending Sisters to America. The Sisters discovered a derelict 12-bed, three-story mansion called St. Francis Hospital in Wichita, Kansas in 1889. The Sisters quickly took over operations, and the hospital turned a profit. In 1893, the Sisters purchased a new building and began expanding the services of St. Francis Hospital. The hospital's Chapel of the Sorrowful Mother was dedicated in 1947.

Francis Hospital was renamed St. Francis Regional Medical Center in 1982. In 2009, the hospital's name was changed to Via Christi Hospital on St. Francis, and was renamed Via Christi St. Francis in 2013.

== Facilities ==
The hospital is an American College of Surgeons-verified Level I trauma center. The hospital also operates a Regional Burn Center.
