= Montana, Kansas =

Unincorporated community in Labette County, Kansas

- Unincorporated community
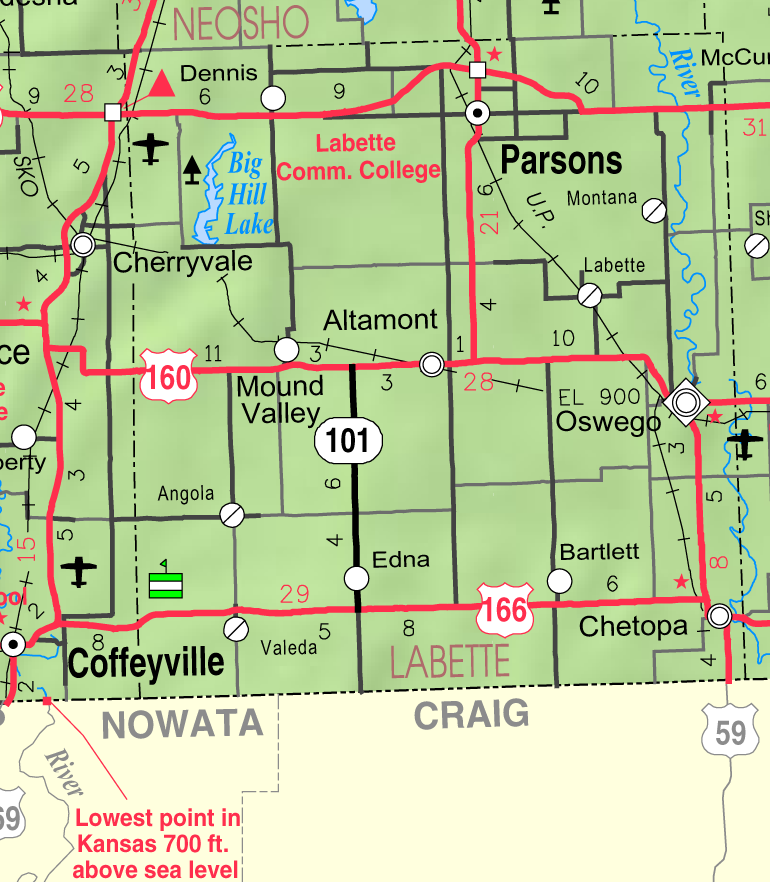
- KDOT map of Labette County (legend)

- Location within Kansas Location within the United States
- Coordinates: 37°16′31″N 95°07′27″W
- Country: United States
- State: Kansas
- County: Labette
- Founded: 1868
- Platted: 1868
- Named for: Montana Territory
- Time zone: UTC-6 (CST)
  - Summer (DST): UTC-5 (CDT)
- Area code: 620

Montana is an unincorporated community in Labette County, Kansas, United States. It was one of the first settlements in Labette County. Unlike other early communities which eventually became ghost towns, Montana remained in existence, but did not grew in size due to a railroad never being built through it.

== History ==
A post office was established at Montana in 1866. Montana was laid out about 1868. The community was named after the Montana Territory.

== Education ==
The community is served by Oswego USD 504 public school district.
