= Saint Luke's Hospital of Kansas City =

- Saint Luke's Health System
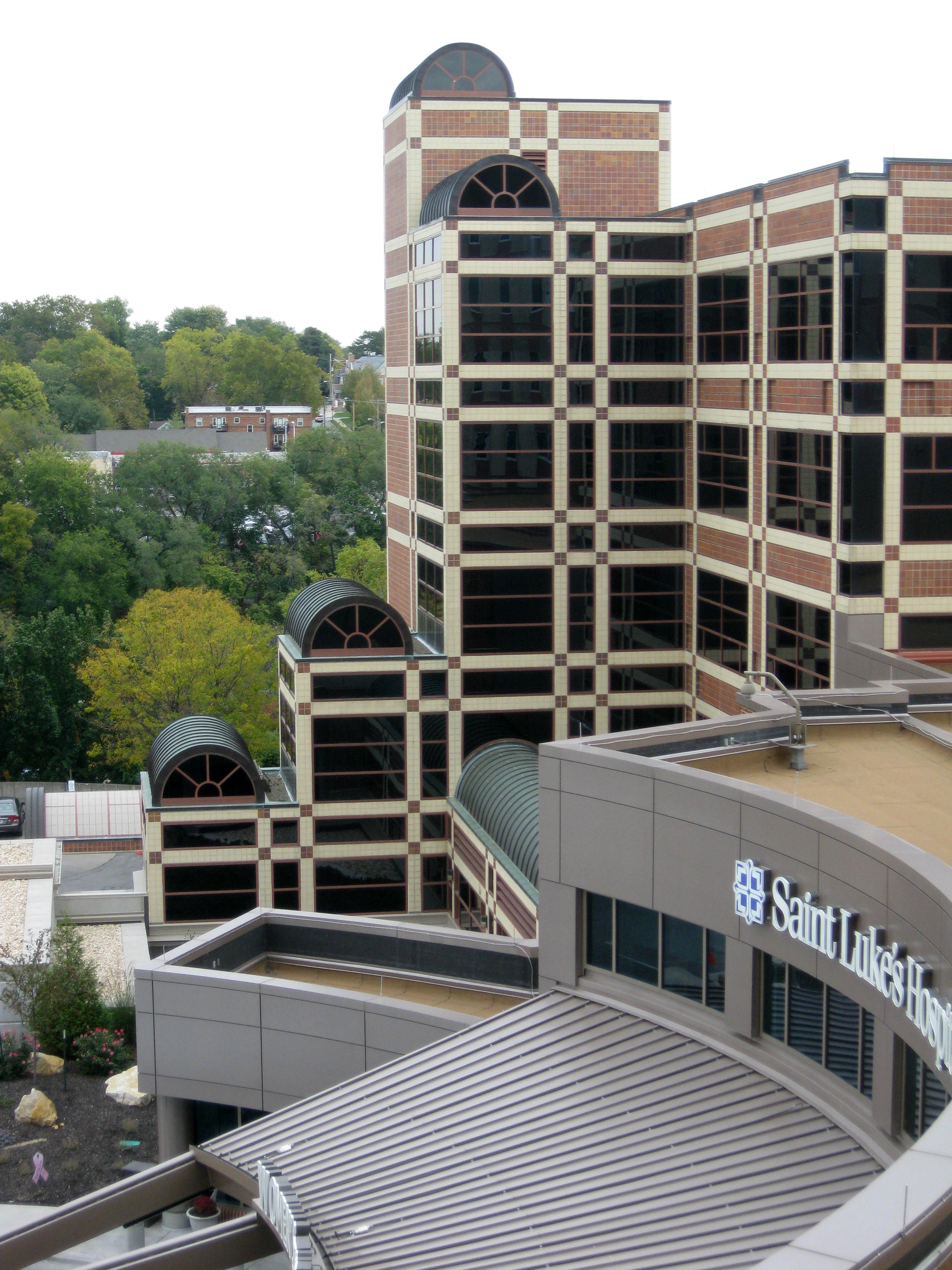
- St. Lukes Hospital

Geography
- Location: Kansas City, Missouri, United States
- Coordinates: 39°02′51″N 94°35′25″W

Organization
- Affiliated university: University of Missouri–Kansas City; Saint Luke's College of Nursing and Health Sciences
- Network: Saint Luke's Health System

Services
- Emergency department: Level I trauma center

Helipads
- Helipad: FAA LID: 5MO5

History
- Opened: 1882

Links
- Website: www.saintlukeskc.org/locations/saint-lukes-hospital-kansas-city
- Lists: Hospitals in Missouri

Saint Luke's Hospital of Kansas City is a tertiary care hospital located at 4401 Wornall Road in Kansas City, Missouri. It is part of the Saint Luke's Health System.

== History ==
The origins of Saint Luke's Hospital of Kansas City began in 1882, when Episcopal priest Henry David Jardine, businessperson F. T. Hadlond, and other Kansas Citians created the Church Charity Association of Kansas City and an Articles of Agreement for benevolent, scientific, educational, and charitable purposes. This led to the establishment of All Saints Hospital, located at Tenth and Campbell streets, on May 10, 1885, by Bishop Charles Franklin Robertson of the Episcopal Diocese of Missouri, but it closed in the 1890s.

In October 1902, the first Saint Luke's hospital opened on the second and third floors of a store at Fifth and Delaware streets as a branch of Episcopalian charities. Dr. Herman E. Pearse provided the furniture and fixtures. The next year, in 1903, the hospital formed a nursing school, which was the predecessor of the Saint Luke's College of Nursing and Health Sciences. The hospital contained 12 beds, a kitchen, an operating room, a laboratory, a reception area, and living quarters for the superintendent of nurses and two students. Saint Luke's stayed in the Delaware Street facility for a year before moving to a house on Fortieth Street and Baltimore Avenue. The hospital was relocated in 1906 to Samuel Scott's large brick home on the southeast corner of Eleventh and Euclid streets, where it remained for approximately 17 years. The hospital later moved to its current location on Country Club Plaza near Mill Creek Parkway and Wornall Road. The new St. Luke's hospital, on a 4-acre tract of ground extending from the west side of J.C. Nichols parkway at Forty-fourth street to Wornall road on the west, opened March 1, 1923. The 150-bed facility was a modern brick fireproof building, designed in the Georgian tradition by Keene and Simpson, architects.

On October 9, 2011, St. Luke's unveiled their new $330 million Mid America Heart Institute.

== Facilities ==
It is known for its Mid America Heart Institute, Mid America Brain and Stroke Institute, and neonatal intensive care services. It is a level 1 trauma center, which provides the most intensive level of trauma care.
