= AdventHealth Lenexa City Center =

AdventHealth Lenexa
- AdventHealth
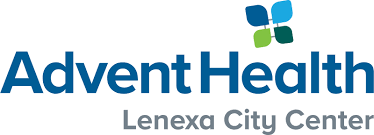

Geography
- Location: 16950 West 86th Street, Lenexa, Kansas, United States
- Coordinates: 38.9738°N 94.7816°W

Organization
- Care system: Private hospital
- Type: General hospital
- Religious affiliation: Seventh-day Adventist Church

Services
- Emergency department: Yes
- Beds: 96

Helipads
- Helipad: No

History
- Constructed: April 13, 2023
- Opened: July 15, 2025

Links
- Website: www.adventhealth.com/hospital/adventhealth-lenexa-city-center
- Lists: Hospitals in Kansas

AdventHealth Lenexa is a non-profit hospital campus in Lenexa, Kansas, United States owned by AdventHealth, it is the first hospital in the city.

== History ==
On April 3, 2019, AdventHealth Shawnee Mission applied with Lenexa for a new 25 acres (10 ha) hospital campus. In early July, the Lenexa City Council approved the plan for the medical campus at Lenexa City Center.

On February 17, 2021, it was announced that AdventHealth would be delaying the construction of its medical campus due to the COVID-19 pandemic. In early November, plans for the hospital campus were reignited. Copaken Brooks changed the height of the future hospital to five stories after residents on the northside, and almost all of the planning commissioners were against its height. Originally AdventHealth Lenexa City Center was to be eight stories and have 200-beds. Also the height of the two medical office buildings changed and the campus went from thirteen buildings to eleven buildings. Also many residents were concerned about traffic at a nearby roundabout and noise produced by helicopters landing at a helipad. The hospital campus will also have a, parking garage, clinic, health club, hotel, retail building and mixed used buildings.

In late June 2022, the Lenexa City Council approved the changes for the hospital campus. And gave AdventHealth permission to start building its hospital campus AdventHealth Lenexa City Center.

On April 13, 2023, there was a groundbreaking for the 244,000 square foot (22,700 m^{2}), AdventHealth Lenexa City Center, and its 56,000 square foot (5,200 m^{2}), three story medical office building. They are part of a first phase project that would cost $247 million to build.

On June 12, 2024, there was a topping out for the very first hospital in Lenexa, Kansas at AdventHealth Shawnee Mission. On July 15, 2025, AdventHealth Lenexa City Center opened with 44 beds, and would later add another 54 beds, increasing the hospitals capacity to 96. The medical facility was designed by HKS, Inc. and built by GE Johnson Construction Company.

== See also ==
- List of Seventh-day Adventist hospitals
