= AdventHealth South Overland Park =

- AdventHealth

Geography
- Location: 7820 West 165th Street, Overland Park, Kansas, United States
- Coordinates: 38°49′58″N 94°40′48″W

Organization
- Care system: Private hospital
- Type: General hospital
- Religious affiliation: Seventh-day Adventist Church

Services
- Standards: Joint Commission
- Emergency department: Yes
- Beds: 85

Helipads
- Helipad: Yes

History
- Constructed: October 3, 2019
- Opened: October 7, 2021

Links
- Website: www.adventhealth.com/hospital/adventhealth-south-overland-park
- Lists: Hospitals in Kansas

AdventHealth South Overland Park, Inc. is a non-profit hospital campus in Overland Park, Kansas owned by AdventHealth.

== History ==
On January 24, 2019, AdventHealth Shawnee Mission announced that it was constructing a new $150 million 193,000 square foot (17,900 m^{2}) hospital in Overland Park, Kansas with 85 beds. It expected that the new hospital would create 200 full-time jobs. On October 3, 2019, GE Johnson Construction Company began building AdventHealth South Overland Park. Rocks had to be broken at the 14.5 acres (5.9 ha) site of the hospital, all total 12,000 cubic yards were removed and crushed to make AB3 or moved to the south side of the hospital.

AdventHealth South Overland Park would open with 38 beds, and have enough land for the hospital to expand to 150 beds in the future. It was being constructed adjacent to AdventHealth South Overland Park ER which opened in 2017, the campus also includes a medical office building that opened the same year as the emergency department. Laura Kelly was at the grand opening of the new hospital. On October 7, 2021, AdventHealth South Overland Park opened. It became the first new hospital to open in the Kansas City metropolitan area in 15 years.

== Awards and recognitions ==
AdventHealth South Overland Park received a grade A from The Leapfrog Group in November 2025 and May 2026.

== See also ==
- List of Seventh-day Adventist hospitals
