= Oswego USD 504 =

Public school district in Oswego, Kansas

Address
- 719 4th St. Oswego, Kansas, 67356; United States
- Coordinates: 37.1674°N 95.1084°W

District information
- Type: Public
- Grades: K to 12
- Schools: 3

Other information
- Website: usd504.org

Oswego USD 504 is a public unified school district headquartered in Oswego, Kansas, United States. The district includes the communities of Oswego, Montana, and nearby rural areas.

== Schools ==
The school district operates the following schools:

Oswego Junior Senior High School

Oswego Junior-Senior High School is the combination of the former Oswego Middle School, an attendance center that closed in May 2015 and previously served Grades 6-8, and Oswego High School, which has operated from the OJSHS campus on Tomahawk Trail in Oswego, Kansas, since 1994. Oswego Middle School was located in an historic 1921 building near uptown Oswego, Kansas and moved into a new addition to the Tomahawk Trail campus in August 2015.

Service Valley Charter Academy

Service Valley Charter Academy is located in rural Labette County, Kansas, and serves students from Kindergarten through Grade 8. Service Valley is a public charter school with a curriculum that incorporates hands-on agricultural science education into all subjects. Students at Service Valley operate an on-site farm and care for and market produce and livestock.

Neosho Heights Elementary School

Neosho Heights Elementary School is located in Oswego, Kansas, and serves students from preschool through Grade 6. The attendance center was named after the Neosho River, which bounds the city of Oswego on its northern and eastern sides.

== See also ==
- Kansas State Department of Education
- Kansas State High School Activities Association
- List of high schools in Kansas
- List of unified school districts in Kansas
