= Saint Luke's South Hospital =

- Saint Luke's Health System
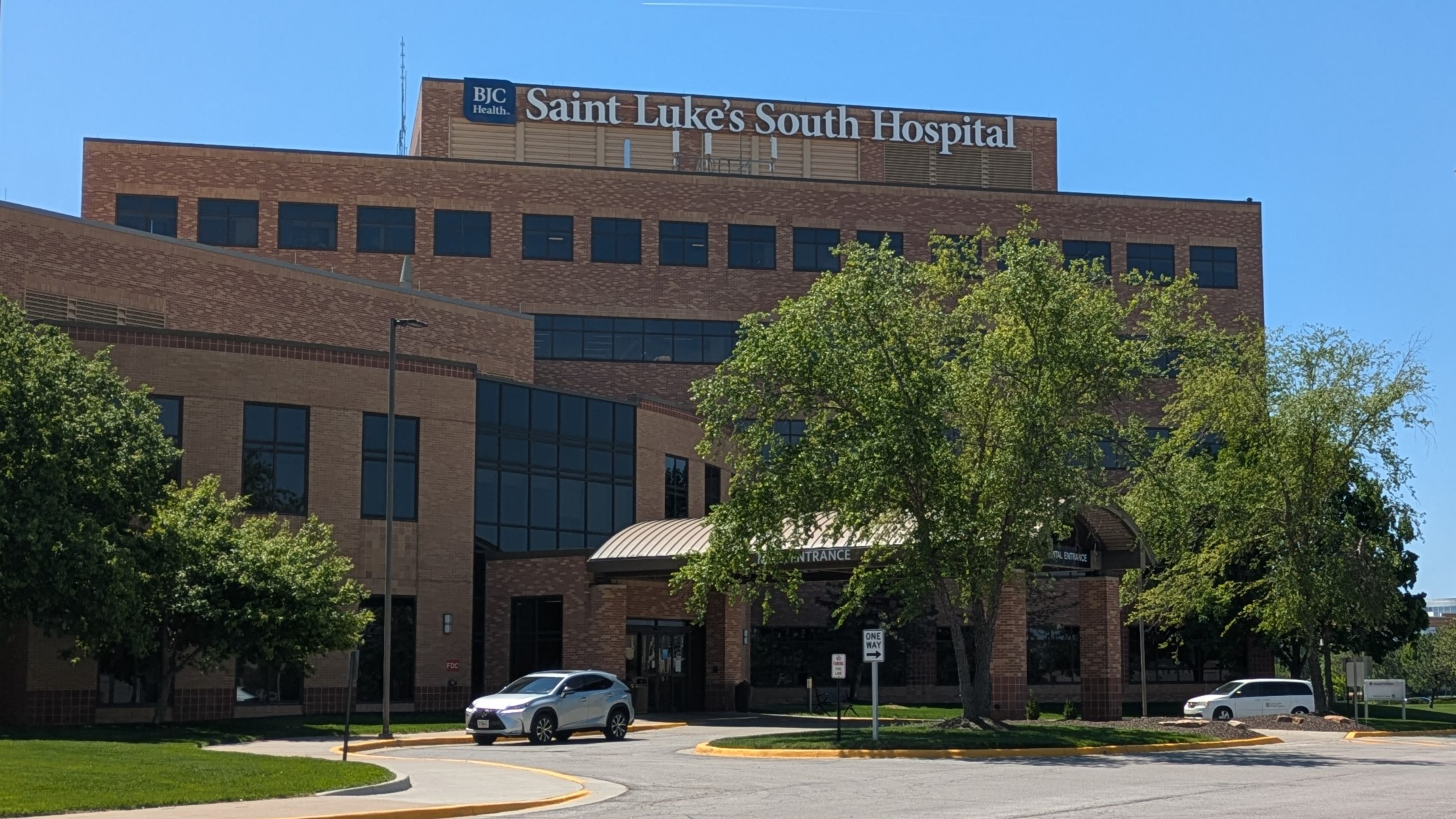

Geography
- Location: 12300 Metcalf Avenue, Overland Park, Kansas, United States
- Coordinates: 38°54′14″N 94°40′10″W

Organization
- Network: Saint Luke's Health System

Services
- Emergency department: Yes
- Beds: 171

Helipads
- Helipad: Yes

History
- Opened: 1998

Links
- Website: www.saintlukeskc.org/locations/saint-lukes-south-hospital
- Lists: Hospitals in Kansas

Saint Luke's South Hospital is a 171-bed hospital located in Overland Park, Kansas.

== History ==
Saint Luke's South first opened in 1998. In 2019, Saint Luke's South completed its 100,000 square-foot Saint Luke's Rehabilitation Institute expansion.

== Facilities ==
Available facilities include an emergency department, catheterization laboratory, radiology, intensive care unit, rehabilitation institute, and outpatient care.
