= Saint Luke's College of Nursing and Health Sciences =

College in the United States

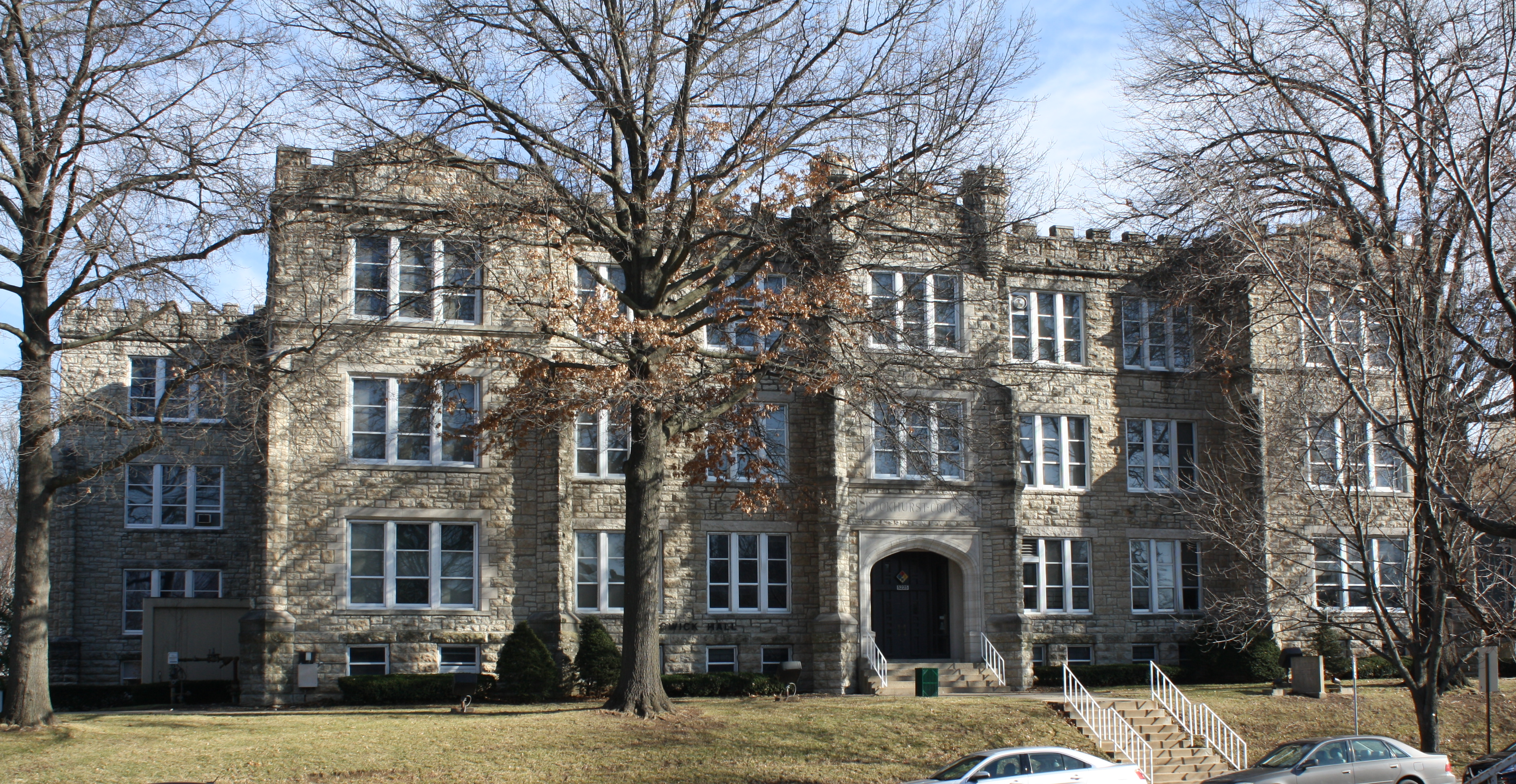
- Sedgwick Hall in 2017
- Established: 1903; 123 years ago
- Parent institution: Rockhurst University
- Affiliations: Saint Luke's Health System
- Dean: Kris Vacek
- Location: Kansas City, Missouri, United States; 39.03218°N 94.57344°W
- Website: www.rockhurst.edu/saint-lukes-college
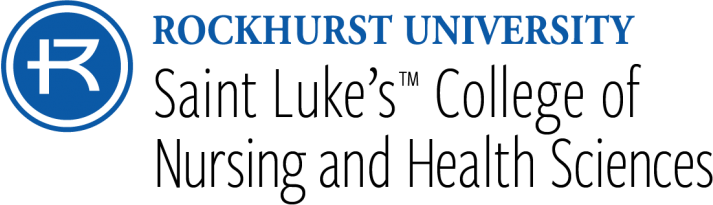

Saint Luke's College of Nursing and Health Sciences is a health sciences-focused college of Rockhurst University with its main campus in Kansas City, Missouri. It was formerly an independent private college associated with Saint Luke's Health System. It enrolls over 550 undergraduate students and 125 graduate students every year. The college offers bachelor's degrees, master's degrees, doctoral degrees, and certificates in nursing and health sciences.

== History ==
The hospital that would later become Saint Luke's Hospital of Kansas City first began as All Saints Hospital in 1885 at the intersection of 10th and Campbell Streets. In 1887, the hospital began offering a training program for nurses at the hospital. In 1903, the School of Nursing was officially established as a three-year diploma program under Eleanor Kelly as a department of Saint Luke's Hospital of Kansas City (the successor to All Saints Hospital). Three students enrolled in the first year of operation, and the school had its first graduate, Virginia Pate, in 1906. The hospital relocated to 44th and Mill Creek Parkway in 1920 and built a nurses' residence on campus. The college further expanded in 1946 when a four-story building was constructed, containing laboratories, classrooms, a library, offices, and residences for the approximately 200 nursing students at the time. The library was relocated to the Helen F. Spencer Center for Education in 1972. Beginning in 1985, the faculty of Saint Luke's Hospital School of Nursing conducted a study of the future needs of nurses and decided to switch from a diploma-based program to a baccalaureate-based program, admitting their first Bachelor of Science in Nursing students in 1991. The final diploma class graduated in 1992 (with the school having educated over 3,047 diploma students since its creation).

The College Board adopted a new master plan in 2010, renaming the college Saint Luke's College of Health Sciences and beginning a journey to grow the school and become a financially independent, private, not-for-profit corporation (with Saint Luke's Hospital of Kansas City being the single shareholder). The school moved to the 624 Westport Road location in 2011. The following year, in 2012, the college launched a Master of Science in Nursing and graduate certificate programs in two specializations: adult-gerontology acute care nurse practitioner and nurse education. These programs received full accreditation in 2015.

In 2018, the Higher Learning Commission approved a change allowing Saint Luke's College of Health Sciences to offer an Associate of Science in Allied Health and Medical Assisting and an Associate of Arts degree in Allied Health. The new programs opened enrollment to first-time freshmen and introduced a general education core focused on multiculturalism and health science professions.

Saint Luke's College of Health Sciences and Rockhurst University merged in 2020 to form Saint Luke's College of Nursing and Health Sciences at Rockhurst University. In June 2022, the college relocated from the Westport Road location to Sedgwick Hall on the main Rockhurst University campus.

In 2023, the college announced it was launching a Master of Science in Nursing psychiatric-mental health nurse practitioner (PMHNP) program.
