= Saint Luke's North Hospital–Barry Road =

Saint Luke's Northland Hospital-Barry Road Campus
- Saint Luke's Health System
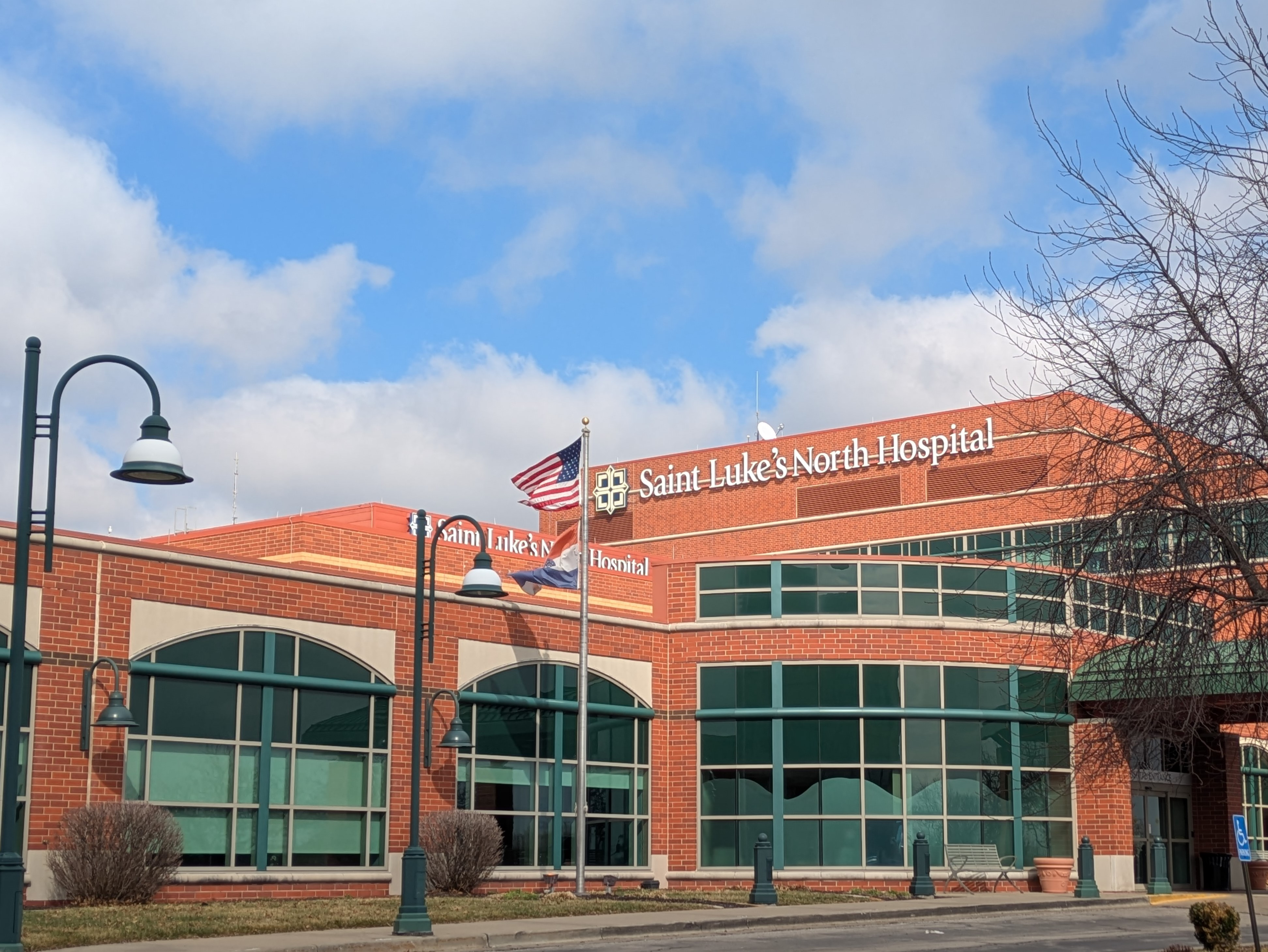

Geography
- Location: 5830 Northwest Barry Road, Kansas City, Missouri, United States
- Coordinates: 39°14′56″N 94°38′54″W

Organization
- Type: Community hospital
- Network: Saint Luke's Health System

Services
- Emergency department: Yes
- Beds: 84

Helipads
- Helipad: FAA LID: MO63

History
- Opened: 1989

Links
- Website: www.saintlukeskc.org/locations/saint-lukes-north-hospital-barry-road
- Lists: Hospitals in Missouri

Saint Luke's North Hospital–Barry Road Campus is an 84-bed hospital located at 5830 Northwest Barry Road in Kansas City, Missouri. The hospital first opened in 1989.

== Services ==
The hospital offers a 24-hour emergency department that utilizes heart and stroke procedures created by Saint Luke's Mid America Heart Institute and Saint Luke's Marion Bloch Neuroscience Institute. The hospital also offers diagnostic testing facilities, a maternity unit with a level II neonatal intensive care unit (NICU), rehabilitation services, and outpatient provider offices.
