= Ascension Via Christi Hospital in Pittsburg =

Ascension Via Christi Hospital in (Pittsburg)
- Ascension Via Christi Health

Geography
- Location: Pittsburg, Kansas, United States
- Coordinates: 37°22′49″N 94°41′03″W

Organization
- Care system: Private
- Type: Community

Services
- Emergency department: Level III trauma center
- Beds: 188

History
- Founded: 1903

Links
- Website: Website
- Lists: Hospitals in Kansas

Ascension Via Christi Hospital in Pittsburg (formerly known as Mt. Carmel Regional Medical Center) is a 188-bed hospital located in Pittsburg, Kansas and operated by Ascension Ascension Via Christi Health.

== History of Name Changes ==
=== Mt. Carmel Hospital ===
Mt. Carmel Hospital was founded in 1903 by the Sisters of St. Joseph of Wichita, Kansas under the direction of Mother Mary Bernard Sheridan, incidentally the same year as the founding of Pittsburg State University. The hospital's original mission was to serve miners and their families with its first 20-bed facility located between Pittsburg, Kansas and Frontenac, Kansas. After expansion in the 1960s, further growth was impeded by under-mining on the then-current hospital site. A community fundraising drive was initiated, and in 1971, the new five-floor, 188-bed facility at Rouse and Centennial was occupied.

=== Mt. Carmel Medical Center ===
In 1995 the first major expansion of the Mt. Carmel Medical Center building came in the form of the Mt. Carmel Regional Cancer Center, a facility that has since been designated as a Community Cancer Center by the National Cancer Institute, the only cancer center in the region to receive the designation.

In that same year the hospital became a part of the newly formed Via Christi Health System as the healing ministries of its sponsoring organization, the Sisters of St. Joseph of Wichita, Kansas and the Sisters of the Sorrowful Mother, also of Wichita, joined forces.

=== Mt. Carmel Regional Medical Center ===
The name of the hospital was changed to Mt. Carmel Regional Medical Center (MCRMC) in 2001 to reflect the facility's increasing presence as a regional health provider.

=== Via Christi Hospital: Pittsburg ===
In October 2009 Via Christi Health Systems, Mt. Carmel's parent company, announced it would be re-branding MCRMC as Via Christi beginning in 2010, while preserving the historic Mt. Carmel name with a new street address of 1 Mt. Carmel Way for the hospital facility. The signage change was completed March 22 and 23, 2010, while the official name change ceremony took place March 26, 2010. At that time, Via Christi Health Systems also began a US$7.1 million renovation of the main entrance, cafeteria, gift shop, and cancer and heart centers at its Pittsburg, KS facility.

== Modern expansion and growth ==
2003 marked the biggest expansion of Mt. Carmel to date, bringing a new Regional Heart Center, Outpatient Surgery Center, Emergency Department, expanded Diagnostic Imaging and Women's Center, along with state-of-the-art MRI machines, and enlarged laboratory, pharmacy, and occupational health service.

In March 2010, Via Christi Health Systems began a US$7.1 million renovation project to update the main entrance, gift shop, and cafeteria, along with adding much needed state-of-the-art equipment to the hospital's cancer and heart centers.

== Hospital rating data ==
The HealthGrades website contains the clinical quality data for Ascension Via Christi Hospital (Pittsburg), as of 2017. For this rating section three different types of data from HealthGrades are presented: clinical quality ratings for fourteen inpatient conditions and procedures, thirteen patient safety indicators and the percentage of patients giving the hospital as a 9 or 10 (the two highest possible ratings).

For inpatient conditions and procedures, there are three possible ratings: worse than expected, as expected, better than expected. For this hospital the data for this category is:

- Worse than expected - 5
- As expected - 9
- Better than expected - 0

For patient safety indicators, there are the same three possible ratings. For this hospital safety indicators were rated as:

- Worse than expected - 0
- As expected - 10
- Better than expected - 3

Percentage of patients rating this hospital as a 9 or 10 - 71% Percentage of patients who on average rank hospitals as a 9 or 10 - 73%
