= List of hospitals in Kansas =

This is a list of hospitals in Kansas, sorted by hospital name.

== Johnson County ==
- AdventHealth Lenexa City Center - Lenexa
- AdventHealth Shawnee Mission (formerly Shawnee Mission Medical Center) – Merriam
- AdventHealth South Overland Park – Overland Park
- Children's Mercy South – Overland Park
- Kansas City Orthopaedic Institute – Leawood
- Menorah Medical Center – Overland Park
- Mid-America Rehabilitation Hospital – Overland Park
- Olathe Medical Center – Olathe
- Overland Park Regional Medical Center – Overland Park
- Saint Luke's South Hospital – Overland Park
- Specialty Hospital of Mid-America – Overland Park

== Sedgwick County ==
- 22nd Medical Group – McConnell Air Force Base, Wichita
- Ascension Via Christi Behavioral Health Center – Wichita
- Ascension Via Christi Rehabilitation Hospital – Wichita
- Ascension Via Christi St. Francis – Wichita
- Ascension Via Christi St. Joseph – Wichita
- Ascension Via Christi St. Teresa – Wichita
- Associated Eye Surgical Center – Wichita
- Derby Ambulatory Surgery Center – Derby
- Kansas Heart Hospital – Wichita
- Kansas Spine Hospital – Wichita
- Kansas Surgery & Recovery Center – Wichita
- Medical Specialists Ambulatory Surgery Center – Wichita
- Plastic Surgery Center – Wichita
- Robert J. Dole VA Medical and Regional Office Center – Wichita
- Team Vision Surgery Center West – Wichita
- Wesley Medical Center – Wichita
- Wesley Rehabilitation Hospital – Wichita
- Wichita Specialty Hospital – Wichita

== Shawnee County ==
- Colmery-O'Neil VA Medical Center – Topeka
- Kansas Neurological Institute – Topeka
- Kansas Rehabilitation Hospital – Topeka
- Select Specialty Hospital of Topeka – Topeka
- Stormont Vail Health – Topeka
- University of Kansas Health System St. Francis Campus (formerly St. Francis Health Center) – Topeka

== Wyandotte County ==
- KVC Psychiatric Hospital – Kansas City
- Providence Medical Center – Kansas City
- University of Kansas Health System – Kansas City
- University of Kansas Medical Center – Kansas City
- University of Kansas Cancer Center - Kansas City

== Other counties ==
- AdventHealth Ottawa (formerly Ransom Memorial Hospital) – Ottawa
- Allen County Hospital – Iola
- Anderson County Hospital – Garnett
- Anthony Medical Center – Anthony
- Ashland Health Center – Ashland
- Atchison Hospital – Atchison
- Bob Wilson Memorial Grant County Hospital – Ulysses
- Central Kansas Medical Center – Great Bend
- Cheyenne County Hospital – Saint Francis
- Citizens Medical Center – Colby
- Clara Barton Hospital – Hoisington
- Clay County Medical Center – Clay Center
- Cloud County Health Center – Concordia
- Coffey County Hospital – Burlington
- Coffeyville Regional Medical Center – Coffeyville
- Comanche County Hospital – Coldwater
- Community HealthCare System – Onaga
- Community Memorial Hospital – Marysville
- Crawford County Hospital District No.1 – Girard
- Decatur Health Systems – Oberlin
- Dwight D. Eisenhower VA Medical Center – Leavenworth
- Edwards County Hospital & Healthcare Center – Kinsley
- Ellinwood District Hospital – Ellinwood
- Ellsworth County Medical Center – Ellsworth
- Flint Hills Community Health Center – Emporia
- Fredonia Regional Hospital – Fredonia
- Fry Eye Surgery Center – Garden City
- Geary Community Hospital – Junction City
- Goodland Regional Medical Center – Goodland
- Gove County Medical Center – Quinter
- Graham County Hospital – Hill City
- Great Bend Regional Hospital - Great Bend
- Greeley County Hospital – Tribune
- Greenwood County Hospital – Eureka
- Grisell Memorial Hospital – Ransom
- Hamilton County Hospital – Syracuse
- Hanover Hospital and Warren Clinic – Hanover
- Harper Hospital District No. 5 – Harper
- Hays Medical Center – Hays
- Heartland LASIK Center – Abilene
- Herington Municipal Hospital – Herington
- Hiawatha Community Hospital – Hiawatha
- Hillsboro Community Medical Center – Hillsboro
- Hodgeman County Health Center – Jetmore
- Holton Community Hospital – Holton
- Hutchinson Regional Medical Center – Hutchinson
- Jefferson County Memorial Hospital and Geriatric Center – Winchester
- Jewell County Hospital – Mankato
- Kansas Voice Center – Lawrence
- Kearny County Hospital – Lakin
- Kingman Community Hospital – Kingman
- Kiowa County Memorial Hospital – Greensburg
- Kiowa District Hospital & Manor – Kiowa
- Labette Health – Parsons
- Lafene Health Center (Kansas State University) – Manhattan
- Lane County Hospital – Dighton
- Larned State Hospital – Larned
- Lawrence Memorial Hospital – Lawrence
- Lincoln County Hospital – Lincoln
- Lindsborg Community Hospital – Lindsborg
- Logan County Hospital – Oakley
- Manhattan Surgical Center – Manhattan
- McPherson Hospital – McPherson
- Meade District Hospital – Meade
- Meadowbrook Rehabilitation Hospital – Gardner
- Medicine Lodge Memorial Hospital – Medicine Lodge
- Memorial Hospital – Abilene
- Mercy Hospital – Moundridge
- Mercy Hospital Columbus – Columbus
- Mercy Hospital Pittsburg – Pittsburg
- Mercy Regional Health Center – Manhattan
- Miami County Medical Center – Paola
- Minneola District Hospital – Minneola
- Mitchell County Hospital Health Systems – Beloit
- Morris County Hospital – Council Grove
- Morton County Health System – Elkhart
- Munson Army Health Center – Fort Leavenworth
- NEK Center for Health and Wellness – Horton
- Nemaha Valley Community Hospital – Seneca
- Neosho Memorial Regional Medical Center – Chanute
- Ness County District Hospital No.2 – Ness City
- Newman Regional Health – Emporia
- Newton Medical Center – Newton
- Northeast Kansas Center for Health and Wellness – Horton
- Northwest Kansas Surgery Center – Hays
- Norton County Hospital – Norton
- Osawatomie State Hospital – Osawatomie
- Osborne County Memorial Hospital – Osborne
- Oswego Medical Center – Oswego
- Ottawa County Health Center – Minneapolis
- Parsons State Hospital & Training Center – Parsons
- Phillips County Hospital – Phillipsburg
- Prairie View Psychiatric Hospital – Newton
- Pratt Regional Medical Center – Pratt
- Quinlan Eye Surgery & Laser Center – Fort Scott
- Quinlan Eye Surgery & Laser Center – Pittsburg
- Rawlins County Health Center – Atwood
- Republic County Hospital – Belleville
- Rice County Hospital District No.1 – Lyons
- Rooks County Health Center – Plainville
- Rush County Memorial Hospital – La Crosse
- Russell Regional Hospital – Russell
- Sabetha Community Hospital – Sabetha
- Saint Catherine Hospital – Garden City
- St. Francis at Ellsworth – Ellsworth
- Saint John Hospital – Leavenworth
- Saint Johns Maude Norton Memorial Hospital – Columbus
- Saint Joseph Memorial Hospital – Larned
- Saint Luke Hospital & Living Center – Marion
- Salina Regional Health Center – Salina
- Satanta District Hospital – Satanta
- Scott County Hospital – Scott City
- Sedan City Hospital – Sedan
- Sheridan County Health Complex – Hoxie
- Smith County Memorial Hospital – Smith Center
- South Central Kansas Regional Medical Center – Arkansas City
- Southwest Medical Center – Liberal
- Stafford District Hospital – Stafford
- Stanton County Health Care Facility – Johnson
- Stevens County Hospital – Hugoton
- Sumner County Hospital – Caldwell
- Sumner Regional Medical Center – Wellington
- Surgery Center of Southwest Kansas – Garden City
- Susan B. Allen Memorial Hospital – El Dorado
- Trego County-Lemke Memorial Hospital – WaKeeney
- Wamego Health Center – Wamego
- Washington County Hospital – Washington
- Western Plains Medical Complex – Dodge City
- Wichita County Health Center – Leoti
- William Newton Memorial Hospital – Winfield
- Wilson County Hospital – Neodesha

== Closed ==
- Halstead Hospital – Halstead Closed in 2002
- Mercy Health Center – Fort Scott (closed in 2018)
- Mercy Hospital – Independence (closed in 2015)
- Rainbow Mental Health Facility – Kansas City
- Topeka State Hospital – Topeka (closed in 1997)
- Cushing Memorial Hospital-Leavenworth, Kansas
