= Oswego Public Library =

- Oswego Public Carnegie Library
- U.S. National Register of Historic Places
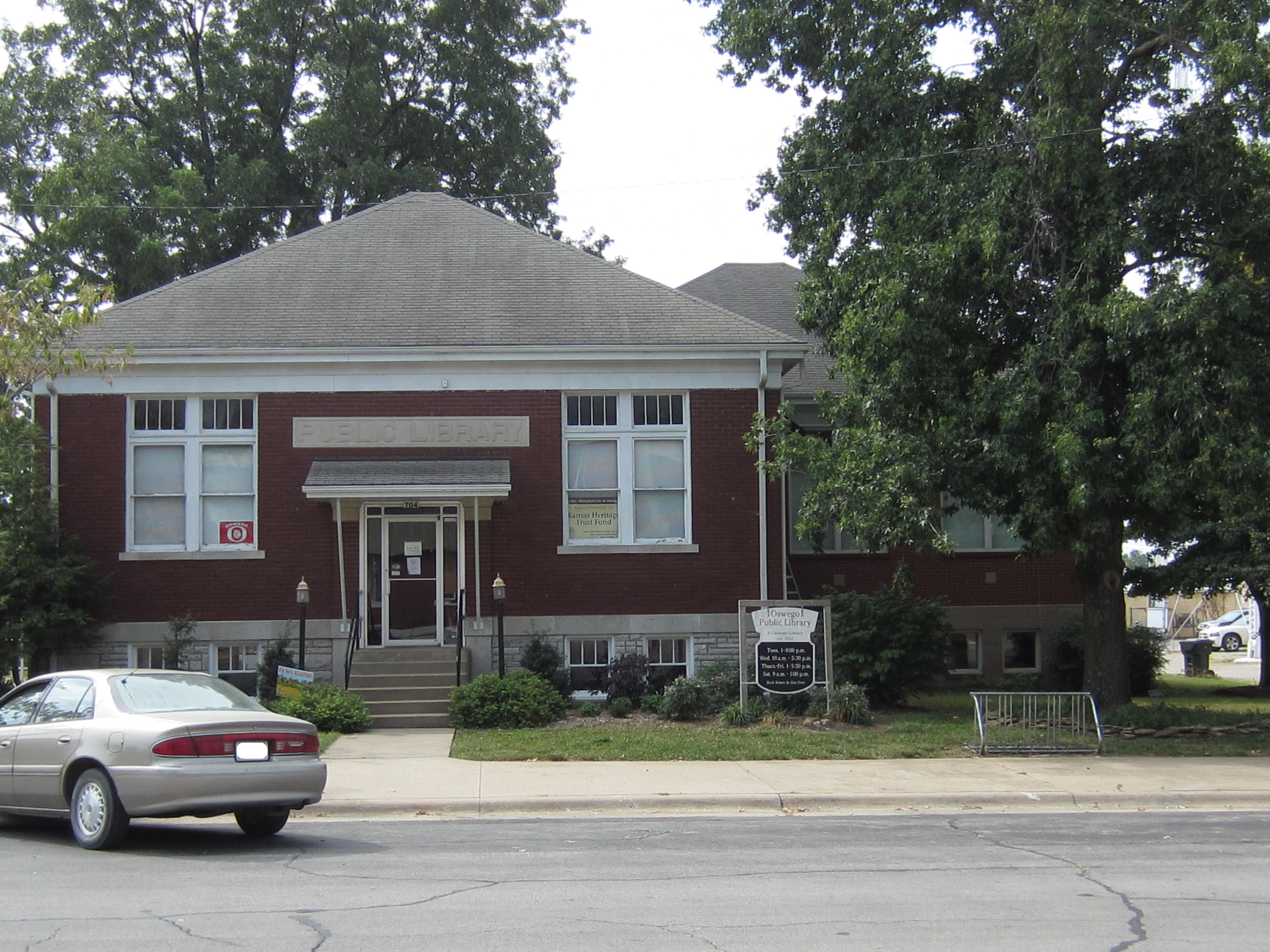
- Oswego Public Library (2013)

- Location within Kansas Location within the United States
- Location: 704 Fourth St., Oswego, KS
- Coordinates: 37°10′1″N 95°6′27″W
- Area: less than one acre
- Built: 1912
- Architect: Parker, F.F.; Kee, William
- Architectural style: Utilitarian
- MPS: Carnegie Libraries of Kansas TR
- NRHP reference No.: 87000956
- Added to NRHP: June 25, 1987

Oswego Public Library (OPL) is a Carnegie Library located in Oswego, Kansas, United States. It is a member of the Southeast Kansas Library System, a consortium of over 100 independent libraries in Southeast Kansas that provides services to member libraries such as inter-library loan.

== History ==
The local library association that would later become Oswego Public Library was formed in 1867.

In the early 20th Century they petitioned Andrew Carnegie, and in 1912 the original library building was constructed at 704 Fourth Street in Oswego, Kansas at the cost of $5,000. The library building was placed on the National Register of Historic Places in 1987, and when the building was expanded with a grant in 1995, great care was taken to preserve the historic architecture stylings of the building. In 2006 the Southeast Kansas Library System announced Oswego Public Library had won its "Library Makeover," a grant project worth over US$15,000 for interior re-design. Under the direction of OPL Librarian/Director Elizabeth Turner, the project was completed on-time and under budget by the summer of 2007.

== Funding ==
OPL receives funding from memorials, the city of Oswego, Kansas, the Southeast Kansas Library System, as well as the State of Kansas.

== Services ==
Oswego Public Library provides library cards free of charge to local residents, provided they can provide proof-of-residency.

The Library has a collection of over 16,000 fiction and non-fiction books, with specialized areas for young children's, teen, and adult fiction, as well as research areas for non-fiction. OPL also has a five-year catalog of back issues of all of its nearly fifty magazine subscriptions, providing patrons with periodical literature for research and pleasure. Hundreds of current CDs, DVDs, Books on Tape, and Books on CD are also available for checkout.

OPL works with the State Library of Kansas and provides related services, such as Kansas State Library Cards.

In the late 2000s, OPL received its first two Gates Foundation computers for Patron Access. Since then, those machines have been supplemented by other library technology purchases and at least two more Gates machines. In total, the library provides seven computers for patron access, including a laptop for use inside the library. OPL also offers free 802.11b/g Wi-Fi and low-cost printing.

The Library has used an automated cataloging system since 1990, one of the first in the area to do so.

== Library makeover project ==
In 2006 the Southeast Kansas Library System announced that Oswego Public Library had won a US$15,000 grant for an interior redesign. Along with a US$7,000 pledge from the Oswego Public Library library board, this idea became known as "Project OSWEGO" and yielded great results, including a new young adult section, an entirely redesigned children's area, complete with a life-size tree sculpture. A coffee house style reading area, complete with daily national and regional newspapers and weekly newspapers, pub seating, and an adequate selection of coffees and teas, was also added.

== KOHA Transition ==
In 2009 the Library announced it would be moving in October to the Koha library automation system, thus providing patrons with off-site online access to library services, including inter-library loan and book reservation. When the transition is complete, a patron receiving a library card at one participating Southeast Kansas Library System Library will be able to check out materials at any other participating SEKLS Library.

As of the summer of 2010, OPL staff had completed the transition. Oswego Public Library patrons may use their library cards at any other participating Southeast Kansas Library System library.
