= Oswego Municipal Airport =

- IATA: none; ICAO: K67; FAA LID: K67

Summary
- Airport type: Public
- Owner: City of Oswego
- Serves: Oswego, Kansas
- Elevation AMSL: 830 ft / 253.0 m
- Coordinates: 37°16′57″N 95°04′27″W

Map
- Location within Kansas

Runways
Direction	Length		Surface
Direction	ft	m	Surface
17/35	2,500	762	Asphalt

Statistics
- Aircraft operations: 600
- Based aircraft: 3

Oswego Municipal Airport (ICAO: K67, FAA LID: K67) is a city-owned public-use airport located in Cherokee County, Kansas, three miles (5 km) east of the central business district of Oswego, a city in Labette County, Kansas, United States.

== Facilities and aircraft ==
Oswego Municipal Airport contains one runway: 17/35 with a 2,500 ft × 50 ft (762 m × 15 m) asphalt pavement.

For the 12-month period ending December 31, 2010, the airport had 600 aircraft operations, an average of 50 per month: 70% local general aviation and 30% transient general aviation. At that time there were 3 aircraft based at this airport: 100% single-engine.

== Future Expansion ==
The City of Oswego is currently planning to construct a new runway with dimensions 3,200 ft x 60 ft. Fuel services and new hangars, as well as repairs to the current runway, are being studied.

A new access road is being constructed to the airport from U.S. Highway 160. It was expected to be completed by the spring of 2011.

The airport's proximity to the Joplin, Missouri, area provides an opportunity for increased expansion into the corporate aviation and general aviation areas.

== See also ==
- List of airports in Kansas
