= 2008 United States federal budget =

2008 Budget of the United States federal government
- Submitted: February 5, 2007
- Submitted by: George W. Bush
- Submitted to: 110th Congress
- Country: United States
- Total revenue: $2.662 trillion (requested) $2.524 trillion (actual); 17.1% of GDP (actual)
- Total expenditures: $2.902 trillion (requested) $2.983 trillion (actual); 20.2% of GDP (actual)
- Deficit: $239 billion (requested) $458.6 billion (actual); 3.1% of GDP (actual)
- Debt: $9.986 trillion (at fiscal end); 67.7% of GDP (actual)
- GDP: $14.752 trillion
- Website: Office of Management and Budget

The 2008 United States Federal Budget began as a proposal by President George W. Bush to fund government operations for October 1, 2007 – September 30, 2008. The requested budget was submitted to the 110th Congress on February 5, 2007.

The government was initially funded through a series of four temporary continuing resolutions. Final funding for the Department of Defense was enacted on November 13, 2007 as part of the Department of Defense Appropriations Act, 2008, while the remaining departments and agencies were funded as part of an omnibus spending bill, the Consolidated Appropriations Act, 2008, on December 26, 2007.

== Total receipts ==
2008 Actual Receipts by Source
1. Individual income tax (45.4%)
2. Social Security/other payroll tax (35.7%)
3. Corporate income tax (12.0%)
4. Excise tax (2.70%)
5. Deposits of earnings and Federal Reserve System (1.30%)
6. Estate and gift taxes (1.10%)
7. Customs duties (1.10%)
8. Other miscellaneous receipts (0.70%)

Receipts by source: (in billions of dollars)

Source	Requested	Actual
Individual income tax	1,247	1,146
Corporate income tax	315	304
Social Security and other payroll tax	927	901
Excise tax	68	67
Estate and gift taxes	26	29
Customs duties	29	28
Deposits of earnings and Federal Reserve System	-	34
Other miscellaneous receipts	51	17
Total	2,662	2,524

== Total spending ==
The President's budget for 2008 totals $2.9 trillion. Percentages in parentheses indicate percentage change compared to 2007. This budget request is broken down by the following expenditures:

- Mandatory spending: $1.788 trillion (+4.2%)
  - $608 billion (+4.5%) – Social Security
  - $386 billion (+5.2%) – Medicare
  - $209 billion (+5.6%) – Medicaid and the State Children's Health Insurance Program (SCHIP)
  - $324 billion (+1.8%) – Unemployment/Welfare/Other mandatory spending
  - $261 billion (+9.2%) – Interest on National Debt
- Discretionary spending: $1.114 trillion (+3.1%)
  - $481.4 billion (+12.1%) – Department of Defense
  - $145.2 billion (+45.8%) – Global War on Terror
  - $69.3 billion (+0.3%) – Department of Health and Human Services
  - $56.0 billion (+0.0%) – Department of Education
  - $39.4 billion (+18.7%) – Department of Veterans Affairs
  - $35.2 billion (+1.4%) – Department of Housing and Urban Development
  - $35.0 billion (+22.0%) – Department of State and Other International Programs
  - $34.3 billion (+7.2%) – Department of Homeland Security
  - $24.3 billion (+6.6%) – Department of Energy
  - $20.2 billion (+4.1%) – Department of Justice
  - $20.2 billion (+3.1%) – Department of Agriculture
  - $17.3 billion (+6.8%) – National Aeronautics and Space Administration
  - $12.1 billion (+13.1%) – Department of Transportation
  - $12.1 billion (+6.1%) – Department of the Treasury
  - $10.6 billion (+2.9%) – Department of the Interior
  - $10.6 billion (-9.4%) – Department of Labor
  - $51.8 billion (+9.7%) – Other On-budget Discretionary Spending
  - $39.0 billion – Other Off-budget Discretionary Spending

The Iraq War and the War in Afghanistan are not included in the regular budget. Instead they are funded through special appropriations.

== Deficit ==
With projected receipts significantly less than projected outlays, the budget proposed by President Bush predicts a net deficit of approximately 240 billion dollars. The actual deficit was 454.8 billion.
