= Ascension Via Christi Health =

Catholic-sponsored healthcare system

- Type: Nonprofit organization
- Industry: Healthcare
- Founded: 1948; 78 years ago
- Headquarters: St. Louis, Missouri, U.S.
- Number of locations: 6 hospitals
- Key people: Jeff Korsmo (CEO & president); Lisa Gilbert, MD (Family medicine faculty member at Via Christi who is passionate about global health, rural health, and bioethics)
- Services: Hospital management
- Owner: Ascension Health
- Number of employees: 6,000 (2008)
- Parent: United States Conference of Catholic Bishops; Mount Carmel Health System
- Website: healthcare.ascension.org

Ascension Via Christi Health is a Catholic-sponsored health care system fully owned by Ascension Health. It is the largest provider of health care services in Kansas and employs more than 6,000 in its hospitals, physician offices and health services in Kansas and northeast Oklahoma.

== History ==
=== Sisters of the Sorrowful Mother and St. Francis Hospital ===
Mother M. Frances Streitel founded a community in 1883 that, by 1885, had come to be known as the Sisters of the Sorrowful Mother. A few years later, Mother Streitel began sending Sisters to America. In 1889, the Sisters learned of a dilapidated 12-bed, three-story house named St. Francis Hospital in Wichita, Kansas. The Sisters soon took over operations and the hospital became profitable. In 1893, the Sisters purchased a new building and began expanding the services of St. Francis Hospital. In 1947, the Chapel of the Sorrowful Mother was opened on the hospital grounds. The hospital has expanded several times and now surrounds the chapel.

St. Francis Hospital was renamed St. Francis Regional Medical Center in 1982. In 2009, the hospital's name was changed to Via Christi Hospital on St. Francis. Today, the hospital is known as Ascension Via Christi St. Francis.

The Sisters of the Sorrowful Mother have continued their growth in the health care and education ministries in the United States as well as internationally.

=== Congregation of St. Joseph and Health Care in Kansas and Oklahoma ===
The first congregation of the Sisters of St. Joseph was formed by six women under the direction of a Jesuit priest, Jean Pierre Medaille, in Le Puy-en-Velay, France, in 1650. Sisters from the congregation came to the United States in 1836.

Focused on education, the Sisters of St. Joseph of Wichita opened a school in Newton, Kansas in 1883. In 1903, they transitioned into health care and opened Mt. Carmel Hospital in Pittsburg, Kansas. The hospital expanded in 1908 and again in 1916.

In 1921, the Sisters assumed ownership of Ponca City Hospital, a 14-bed hospital in Ponca City, Oklahoma.

By 1925, the Sisters had become responsible for Wichita Hospital, which had been founded by the Ladies' Benevolent Society in the 1800s near Douglas and Seneca in Wichita. In 1941, construction began on St. Joseph Hospital near Harry and Clifton in Wichita, which was seen as an expansion of Wichita Hospital. A tornado destroyed Wichita Hospital's east wing in 1953, which caused the hospital to close temporarily. Although the hospital was repaired and remodeled after the disaster, it was closed permanently in 1961. The hospital's patients were cared for at St. Joseph Hospital.

The Sisters expanded St. Joseph Hospital with the completion of a seven-story medical tower in 1976. St. Joseph Hospital also was renamed to St. Joseph Medical Center. In 2009, due to its location on East Harry Street, its name was changed to Via Christi Hospital on Harry. In 2013, to reflect the hospital's heritage, it was changed to Via Christi Hospital St. Joseph.

The Sisters of St. Joseph of Wichita joined six other congregations to form the Congregation of St. Joseph in 2007. The Congregation exercises its health care ministries through Ascension Health. According to the Via Christi Health website, "The Wichita-based Sisters maintain a motherhouse in Wichita and continue their ministries at Via Christi's hospitals as well as other ministries to serve low-income individuals and those escaping domestic violence."

=== Formation of Via Christi Health ===
On October 1, 1995, the sponsoring ministries of St. Francis Regional Medical Center and St. Joseph Medical Center, the Sisters of the Sorrowful Mother and the Sisters St. Joseph, came together to form Via Christi Health System.

=== Via Christi Health acquires Wichita Clinic ===
Via Christi Health announced in November 2011 a plan to acquire Wichita Clinic, an independent physicians group. The deal closed in December 2010, with the Wichita Clinic to be renamed Via Christi Clinic.

=== Via Christi becomes full owner of Mercy Regional Health Center ===
On February 28, 2014, Via Christi Health became full owner of Mercy Regional Health Center in Manhattan, Kansas. Via Christi Health and the Memorial Hospital Association had 50-50 ownership of the hospital since 1996.

== Ascension Via Christi Today ==
Ascension Via Christi Health is led by Jeff Korsmo, CEO. He was named president and CEO on June 27, 2011 and took reins of the organization that September. Ascension Via Christi Health fully/partially owns or manages 12 hospitals and 15 senior villages and nursing homes throughout Kansas, where it employs more than 10,000 people, including 300 doctors and 117 mid-level providers. In March 2012, Ascension Via Christi Health was awarded HealthGrades America's 100 Best Hospitals Award.
