= Oswego Junior Senior High School (Kansas) =

Location
- 1501 Tomahawk Trail; Oswego, Kansas 67356; United States; 37°10′26″N 95°7′3″W

Information
- School type: public secondary
- School district: Oswego USD 504
- Superintendent: Doug Beisel
- Principal: Rob Schneeberger
- Teaching staff: 20
- Grades: 7–12
- Gender: coed
- Enrollment: 192 (2023-2024)
- Campus type: Commuter Town/Rural
- Colors: Red; White
- Slogan: Believe, Achieve, Succeed!
- Song: Oswego High!
- Fight song: On the Warpath
- Athletics conference: Three Rivers League
- Mascot: Indians
- Team name: Indians Lady Indians
- Rival: Chetopa High School
- Accreditation: AdvancED; Blue Ribbon; 2011
- Website: School website

Oswego Junior Senior High School is a public co-educational school in Oswego, Kansas serving students in grades 7-12. The school is part of the Oswego USD 504 school district.

== History ==
The former Oswego High School moved to this site in 1994 from a historic 1921 building near uptown Oswego. Following the high school's move, the former Oswego Junior High School moved from the former Westside School attendance center into the high school's former building and became Oswego Middle School, serving grades 6-8.

In 2015, Oswego USD 504 completed a large expansion at the Tomahawk Trail campus, and combined the two attendance centers, creating Oswego Junior Senior High School. Sixth grade students returned to the Neosho Heights Elementary School attendance center.

== Academics ==
Oswego High School was honored in 2011 by the United States Department of Education as part of the National Blue Ribbon Schools Program. The Blue Ribbon Award recognizes public and private schools which perform at high levels or have made significant academic improvements.

== Athletics ==
Oswego High School fields athletic teams in baseball, basketball, cheerleading, cross country, football, golf, softball, track and field, and volleyball.

Oswego Junior High School teams include basketball, cheerleading, football, track and field, and volleyball. Both schools have a pep band for football and basketball games.

== Arts ==
The campus offers programs in concert band, concert choir, photography, theatre, and the visual arts.

== See also ==
- List of high schools in Kansas
- List of unified school districts in Kansas
