= Saint Luke's East Hospital =

- Saint Luke's Health System

Geography
- Location: 100 NE Saint Luke's Boulevard, Lee's Summit, Missouri, United States
- Coordinates: 38°56′30″N 94°22′55″W

Organization
- Type: Community hospital
- Network: Saint Luke's Health System

Services
- Emergency department: Yes
- Beds: 238

Helipads
- Helipad: Yes

History
- Opened: 2006

Links
- Website: www.saintlukeskc.org/locations/saint-lukes-east-hospital
- Lists: Hospitals in Missouri

Saint Luke's East Hospital is a 238-bed hospital located in Lee's Summit, Missouri.

== History ==
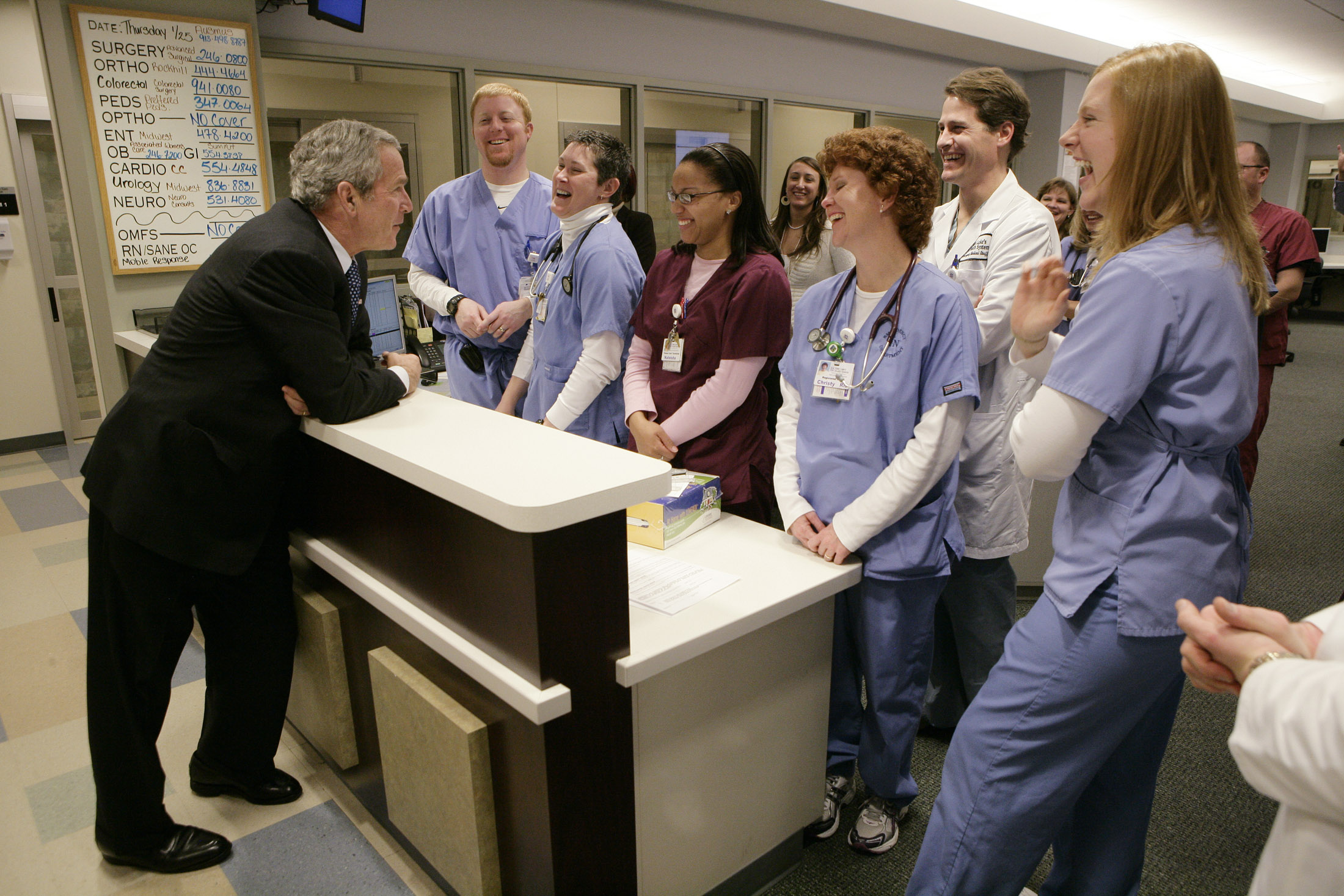
President George W. Bush visits with Saint Luke's East Hospital staff in 2007

Saint Luke's East Hospital first began offering select services on March 18, 2005, followed by a full opening in 2006. In 2007, then President of the United States George W. Bush toured the hospital and participated in a roundtable discussion about health care initiatives and affordability.

The hospital underwent a $68 million expansion in 2011, added a new oncology wing in 2013, and added 30 additional beds in 2015. In 2018, Saint Luke's East completed a $10 million, 25,000-square-foot surgical department expansion which included two new operating suites, triage and post-anesthesia care unit (PACU) rooms, along with additional work and storage space. In 2023, the hospital began a $52 million project featuring a 62,000-square-foot addition and the renovation of 52,000 square feet of existing space.
