= Saint Luke's North Hospital–Smithville =

Saint Luke's Northland Hospital-Smithville Campus
- Saint Luke's Health System

Geography
- Location: 601 South 169 Highway in Smithville, Missouri, United States
- Coordinates: 39°22′36″N 94°34′52″W

Organization
- Type: General
- Network: Saint Luke's Health System

Services
- Beds: 92

History
- Opened: 1938

Links
- Website: www.saintlukeskc.org/locations/saint-lukes-north-hospital-smithville
- Lists: Hospitals in Missouri

Saint Luke's North Hospital–Smithville Campus is located at 601 South 169 Highway in Smithville, Missouri. It is the Northland area's first hospital and is a 92-bed facility.

== History ==
Smithville Campus was established as Spelman Hospital in 1938 and is located in Smithville, Missouri.

Arch E. Spelman founded Smithville's first hospital in 1938 in the old downtown, as an 11-bed space. By 1962, the hospital had relocated to its current site on U.S. 169 and became known as Spelman Memorial Hospital. By 1993, it became known as St. Luke's Northland Hospital.

The hospital includes Saint Luke's Primary Care–Smithville, a family medicine clinic, an inpatient rehabilitation unit, and an inpatient mental health unit.
