= Saint Luke's Health System =

Episcopal Church non-profit hospital network

- Company type: Non-profit
- Industry: Healthcare
- Founded: Kansas City, Missouri (July 7, 1882; 143 years ago)
- Founder: Henry David Jardine
- Headquarters: Kansas City, Missouri, US
- Number of locations: 16
- Area served: Greater Kansas City Metro
- Key people: Melinda L. Estes, President and CEO
- Number of employees: Approx. 12,000
- Website: Saint Luke's Health System

Saint Luke's Health System is an Episcopal Church non-profit hospital network in the bi-state Kansas City metro area, located in northeast Kansas and northwest Missouri. With over 12,000 local employees, it is the third largest private employer in the Kansas City metro.

Saint Luke's Health System traces its history to its flagship hospital, Saint Luke's Hospital of Kansas City, which was established in 1882. On January 1, 2024, its operations were merged with those of BJC HealthCare, forming BJC Health System.

== Locations ==
- Anderson County Hospital, Garnett, Kansas
- Allen County Hospital, Iola, Kansas
- Hedrick Medical Center, Chillicothe, Missouri
- Saint Luke's Bishop Spencer Place, Kansas City, Missouri
- Saint Luke's Community Hospital – Leawood, Leawood, Kansas
- Saint Luke's Community Hospital – Legends, Kansas City, Kansas
- Saint Luke's Community Hospital – Olathe, Olathe, Kansas
- Saint Luke's Community Hospital – Overland Park, Overland Park, Kansas
- Saint Luke's Community Hospital – Roeland Park, Roeland Park, Kansas
- Saint Luke's Community Hospital – Shawnee, Shawnee, Kansas
- Saint Luke's Cushing Hospital, Leavenworth, Kansas
- Saint Luke's East Hospital, Lee's Summit, Missouri
- Saint Luke's Hospice House, Kansas City, Missouri
- Saint Luke's Hospital of Kansas City, Kansas City, Missouri
- Saint Luke's Hospital of Kansas City's Crittenton Children's Center, Kansas City, Missouri
- Saint Luke's North Hospital–Barry Road, Kansas City, Missouri
- Saint Luke's North Hospital–Smithville, Smithville, Missouri
- Saint Luke's South Hospital, Overland Park, Kansas
- Wright Memorial Hospital, Trenton, Missouri

Cushing Hospital was closed in July 2020 because of financial difficulties caused by the COVID-19 pandemic in the United States.

== Institutes ==
- Saint Luke's Mid America Heart Institute
- Saint Luke's Marion Bloch Neuroscience Institute
- Saint Luke's Cancer Institute
- Saint Luke's Midwest Ear Institute
- Saint Luke's Rehabilitation Institute

== Affiliations ==
- Saint Luke's College of Nursing and Health Sciences
