= Olathe Medical Center =

The University of Kansas Health System Olathe Hospital
- University of Kansas Health System

Geography
- Location: Olathe, Kansas, United States
- Coordinates: 38.8526°N 94.8229°W

Organization
- Care system: Non-profit
- Type: Teaching hospital, Acute care
- Affiliated university: University of Kansas Medical Center
- Network: University of Kansas Health System

Services
- Emergency department: Yes
- Beds: 300

History
- Former name: Olathe Medical Center
- Opened: 1953 (as Olathe Community Hospital)

Links
- Website: www.kansashealthsystem.com/locations/olathe-hospital
- Lists: Hospitals in Kansas

The University of Kansas Health System Olathe Hospital, formerly known as Olathe Medical Center, is a non-profit, 300-bed acute-care hospital located in Olathe, Kansas. In 2023, the hospital became part of the University of Kansas Health System.

== History ==
In 1950, local residents formed the Olathe Hospital Foundation, Inc. to address the lack of a dedicated medical facility in the area. Through local fundraising, the Olathe Community Hospital opened in 1953 as a 30-bed facility at the corner of Santa Fe and Cooper. By 1955, it had treated 1,511 residents, and in 1956, staff delivered 411 babies.

In the early 1960s, the then current hospital building began to reach capacity. A fundraising campaign for a replacement facility began in 1964. By 1967, a new hospital building was completed, and in 1968, the institution officially changed its name to Olathe Medical Center. This expansion introduced 24-hour emergency services, a 12-bed intensive care unit, and specialized departments for radiology and anesthesiology. In 1987, the main hospital was relocated to its current 250-acre campus at 151st Street and Interstate-35, which expanded its capacity to 300 beds.

In May 2017, the hospital expanded its obstetric services by opening a standalone, four-story birth center and Level II neonatal intensive care unit (NICU), replacing the original maternity ward located on the fifth floor of the main hospital building. In January 2023, the hospital's parent organization, Olathe Health, announced it agreed to be acquired by the University of Kansas Health System.

In 2025, the hospital established an ACGME-accredited internal medicine residency program program affiliated with the University of Kansas School of Medicine.
