= Mid America Heart Institute =

Hospital in Kansas City, Missouri

- Saint Luke's Health System

Geography
- Location: Kansas City, Missouri, United States
- Coordinates: 39.048360°N 94.590563°W

Organization
- Type: Specialist

Services
- Speciality: Cardiovascular care

History
- Opened: 1882

Links
- Lists: Hospitals in Missouri

The Mid America Heart Institute (MAHI) is located in Kansas City, Missouri and is one of the first and largest hospitals developed and designed specifically for cardiovascular care. It is a subsidiary of the not-for-profit Saint Luke's Hospital of Kansas City and is a part of Saint Luke's Health System. The Heart Institute is affiliated with the University of Missouri-Kansas City School of Medicine and has earned the certification as a Comprehensive Cardiac Center from the Joint Commission.

== History ==
Cardiovascular care was provided at Saint Luke's Hospital since its inception in 1882. The Mid America Heart Institute was commissioned in 1975. At that time, the vast majority of all heart procedures in the Kansas City area and over 20% of cardiovascular procedures in both Kansas and Missouri were done by providers on staff at Saint Luke's Hospital. The Mid America Heart Institute began construction in 1979 and was dedicated in 1981. An additional five stories were added in 1990. In 2011, a new $330 million Mid America Heart Institute building was opened.

== Facilities ==
The Mid America Heart Institute now has a 10-story facility which includes cardiovascular and cardiothoracic intensive care units. There are five cardiac catheterization laboratories, two electrophysiology laboratories, four cardiac surgical suites, post-procedure recovery units, and cardiac rehabilitation. Dedicated cardiac imaging suites for echocardiography, nuclear imaging, computed tomography (CT), and magnetic resonance imaging (MRI) are also available. Finally, the Mid America Heart Institute houses a research facility with its own clinical and basic science faculty as well as a full research and statistical support staff. They are one of only four analytic centers for the National Cardiovascular Data Registry (NCDR).

== Notable achievements ==
- Cardiologist Geoffrey Hartzler became the first in the world to perform balloon angioplasty in a patient with an acute myocardial infarction in 1981
- First balloon angioplasty for coronary artery disease in multiple vessels
- Developed the first steerable coronary guidewire
- First advanced coronary angioplasty fellowship training program in the country
- Incorporated programmed stimulation and burst pacing in implantable cardioverter-defibrillators (ICDs) as a means of terminating tachycardias
- Formally recognized by the President of the United States with the Malcolm Baldrige National Quality Award for quality and performance excellence in 2003
- Developed the Kansas City region's first cardiac transplant program and performed over 1000 heart transplants to date, ranking it in the top 15 in the country as far as volume
- John Spertus developed and popularized patient reported outcome tools in cardiovascular care including the Seattle Angina Questionnaire (SAQ) and the Kansas City Cardiomyopathy Questionnaire (KCCQ)
