= Labette Health =

Geography
- Location: Parsons, Kansas, United States
- Coordinates: 37°19′16″N 95°15′52″W

Services
- Emergency department: Level III trauma center
- Beds: 109

Links
- Website: http://www.labettehealth.com/
- Lists: Hospitals in Kansas

Labette Health is a 99 bed Level III Trauma Center located in Parsons, Kansas and was founded in 1961. Labette Health is accredited by the American Osteopathic Association's Healthcare Facilities Accreditation Program.
