= Hospital Hill =

Neighborhood in Kansas City, Missouri

Coordinates: 39°05′00″N 94°34′30″W

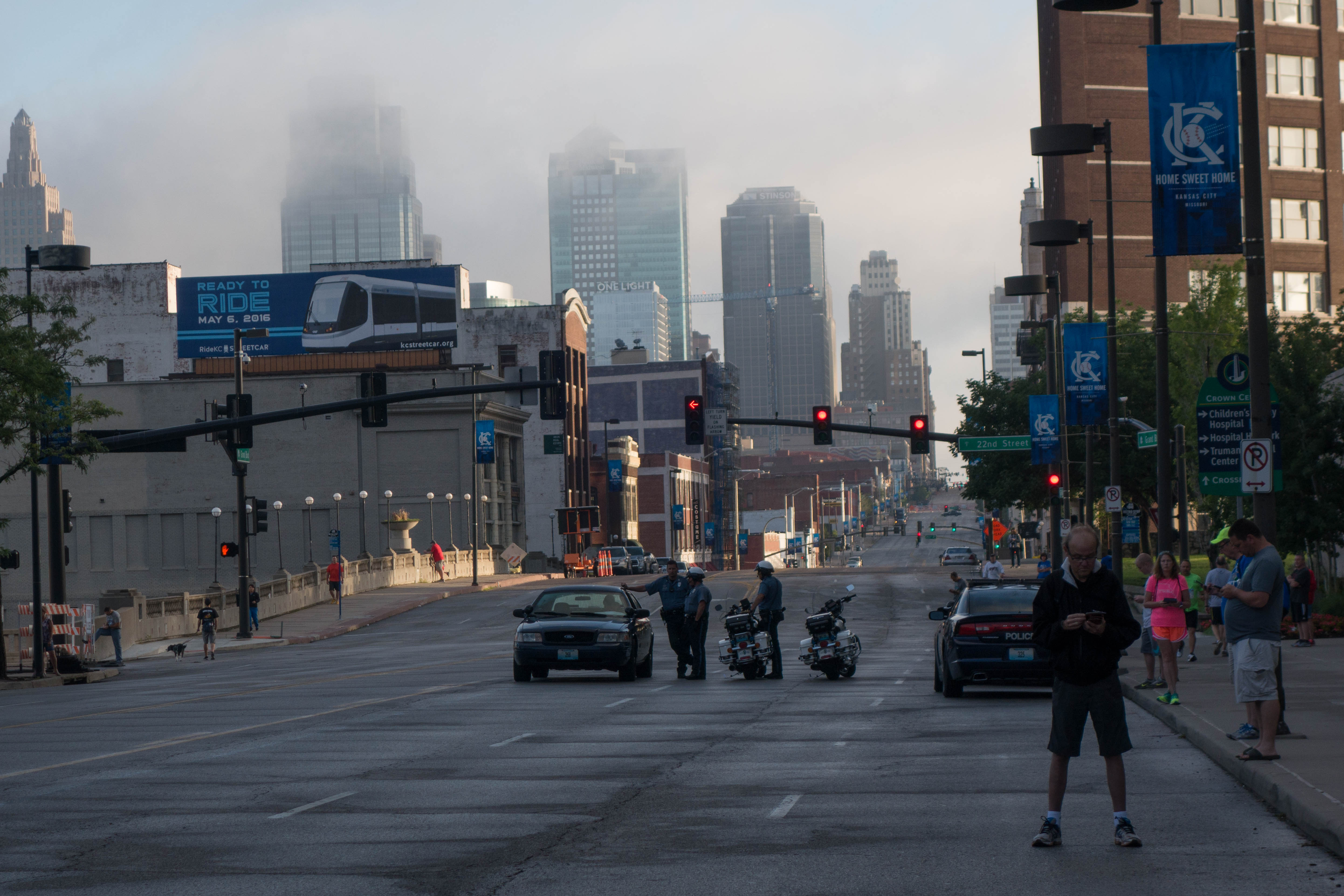
Hospital Hill, Kansas City in June 2016

Hospital Hill is a neighborhood in Kansas City, Missouri. The neighborhood is located between 22nd Street to 25th Street and Gillham Road to Troost Avenue. This name reflects the geography and a history of public hospitals on the site since 1870. Hospital Hill grew in concordance with the construction of local hospitals, and was further populated as the University of Missouri–Kansas City School of Medicine was established.

Hospital Hill hosts University Health Truman Medical Center, Children's Mercy Hospital, and the University of Missouri – Kansas City schools of medicine, pharmacy, nursing, and dentistry.
