= University of Missouri–Kansas City School of Dentistry =

Dental school in Kansas City, Missouri, US

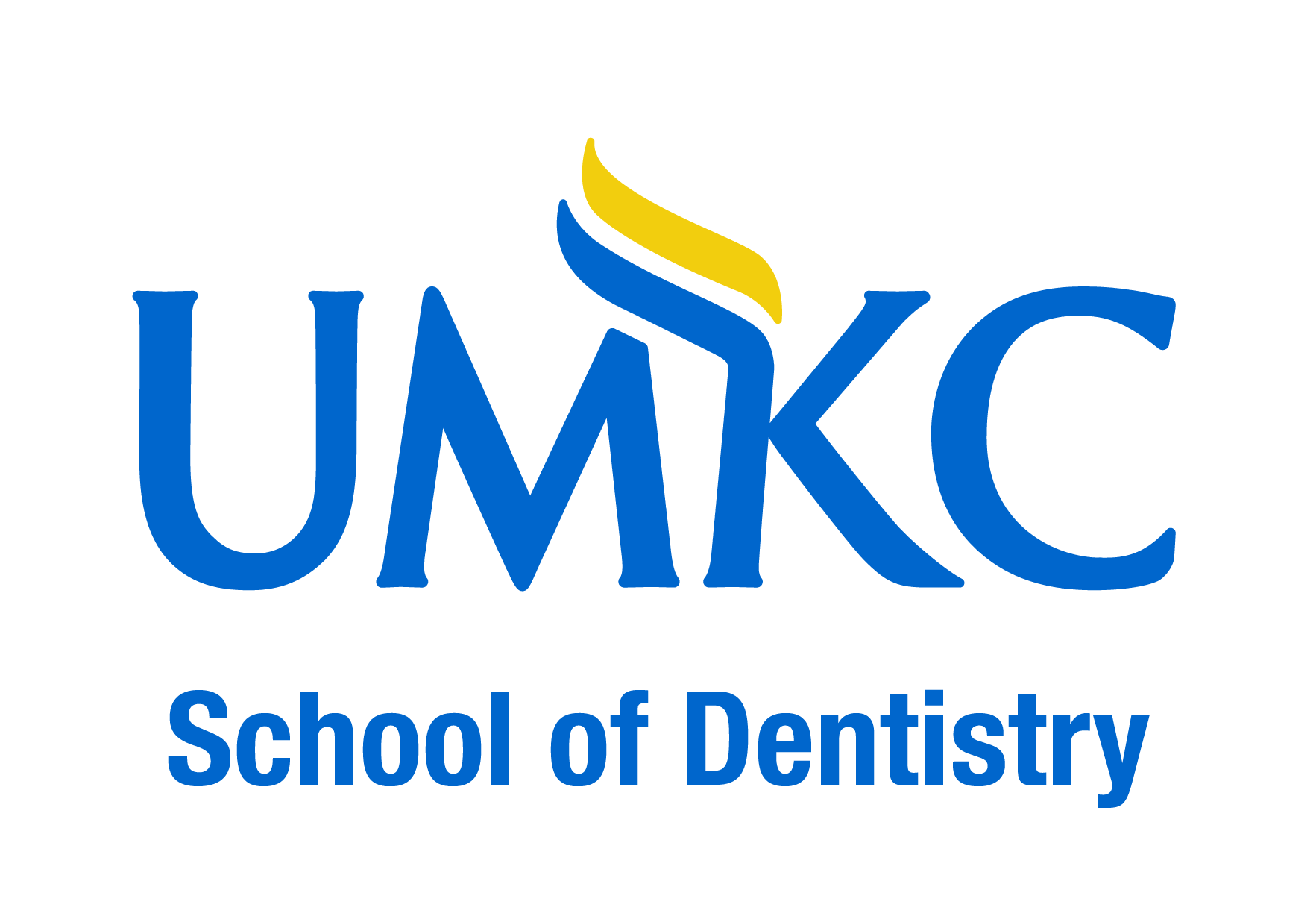
- Type: Dental school
- Established: 1881; 145 years ago
- Parent institution: University of Missouri–Kansas City
- Affiliations: University of Missouri System
- Dean: Paul Luepke
- Location: Kansas City, Missouri, USA; 39°04′55″N 94°34′37″W
- Campus: Urban
- Colors: Blue and gold
- Website: UMKC School of Dentistry

The School of Dentistry is a dental school at the University of Missouri-Kansas City. The School of Dentistry is located on Hospital Hill in Kansas City, close to the University of Missouri–Kansas City School of Medicine, Truman Medical Center-Hospital Hill and Children's Mercy Hospital.

== History ==
UMKC is the only public dental school in Missouri and trained approximately two thirds of the dentists practicing in Missouri. It enrolls approximately 110 students each year in its 4-year DDS program. It also has an RDH program, an AEGD program, as well as specialty residencies in Periodontics, Orthodontics, Endodontics, and Oral Surgery.

The dental school was established in 1881 as the Kansas City Dental College and was originally part of Kansas City Medical College. The Kansas City Dental College merged with Western Dental College to form the Kansas City-Western Dental College. In 1941, the Dental College affiliated with the privately supported University of Kansas City and became that institution's School of Dentistry. In 1961 the University of Kansas City joined the four-campus state University of Missouri system. Since then the dental school has been known as the UMKC School of Dentistry.

During World War II, in response internment of Japanese Americans, then dean Roy J. Rinehart sought to take in Japanese-American dental students who were unfairly expelled from West Coast schools. The school continues to take several students from Hawaii each year since then and has a strong alumni presence in Hawaii.

In 1965, Dr. Donald Randolph Brown, Sr. DDS became the school's first African American graduate.

Construction of a new dental clinic is planned for completion in May of 2026. The new Healthcare Innovation and Delivery Building, an approximately 125,000-square-foot, five-story facility, is planned on a university-owned lot at 25th and Charlotte streets. It will contain dental clinics as well as medical offices.

== Alumni ==
- Copeland Shelden
- Howard Farran, class of 1987 (founder of DentalTown)
- George Hollenback, class of 1907 (inventor of Hollenback carver)
