= University of Missouri–Kansas City School of Medicine =

American public medical school

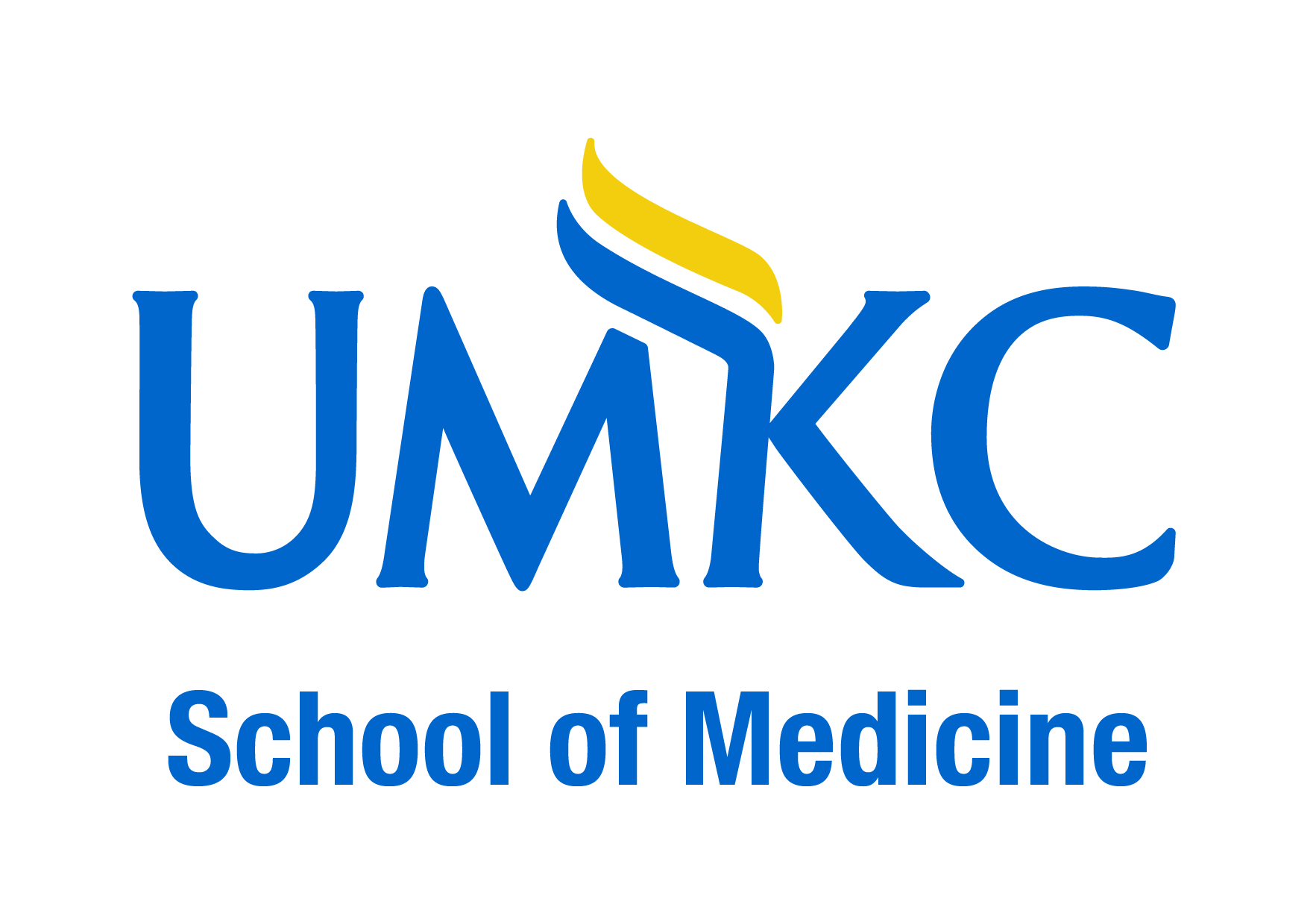
- Other name: UMKC-SOM
- Type: Medical school
- Established: June 25, 1971; 55 years ago
- Founders: E. Grey Dimond, Richardson K. Noback, Homer Wadsworth, and Nathan Stark
- Parent institution: University of Missouri–Kansas City
- Accreditation: LCME
- Affiliations: University of Missouri System
- Dean: Alexander Norbash, M.D., M.S., FACR
- Total staff: 886 (2026)
- Students: 877 (Spring 2026)
- Undergraduates: 217 (Spring 2026)
- Postgraduates: 154 (Spring 2026)
- Doctoral students: 504 (Spring 2026)
- Location: Kansas City, Missouri, United States
- Campus: Urban
- Other Campuses: St. Joseph, Missouri
- Colors: Blue and gold
- Website: www.med.umkc.edu

The University of Missouri–Kansas City School of Medicine, established in 1971, was founded through the efforts of cardiologist E. Grey Dimond and Kansas City civic leaders Homer Wadsworth and Nathan Stark. is one of three medical schools located near downtown Kansas City and only one of two public medical schools in the state of Missouri. The school offers a traditional four-year M.D. program as well as an accelerated combined B.A./M.D. program based on a six-year curriculum. The school of medicine admits students into the program directly from high school, and graduates are able to earn a baccalaureate and a Doctor of Medicine degree (B.A./M.D.) from UMKC. The curriculum integrates the liberal arts, basic sciences, and clinical sciences with a team approach to learning. More than 4,000 physicians have graduated from the University of Missouri–Kansas City School of Medicine, with the majority being in the six-year combined degree program.

== History ==
The University of Missouri–Kansas City School of Medicine was established in 1971. Its founding followed efforts by Kansas City civic leaders Homer Wadsworth and Nathan Stark, who began developing plans for a medical school in the early 1960s as part of the redevelopment of Kansas City's Hospital Hill district. Cardiologist E. Grey Dimond, a former chairman of the Department of Medicine at the University of Kansas, became a central figure in the school's creation. In 1968, Dimond was appointed as a consultant on health affairs to the UMKC chancellor and began developing an accelerated six-year medical education program. His proposed curriculum combined undergraduate and medical education with early clinical experience through a faculty-led docent system.

Richardson K. Noback, M.D., was appointed the school's founding dean in 1971, serving until 1978. The school officially began classes on August 30, 1971, enrolling an initial class of 18 students. Its first nine medical students, who had entered with advanced standing, graduated in 1973. The school's first complete six-year B.A./M.D. class, consisting of 33 students, graduated in 1977.

The school's original $13.2 million medical education building opened in 1974. Its early clinical affiliations included Research Medical Center in 1971 and Children's Mercy Hospital in 1972. Truman Medical Center became a primary teaching hospital in 1976, replacing Kansas City General Hospital. The school's docent-based approach to medical education was recognized as a Model Education Program by the National Fund for Medical Education in 1988.

== Rankings ==
For 2026, U.S. News & World Report ranked the University of Missouri–Kansas City School of Medicine:

- #54 in Most Graduates Practicing in Health Professional Shortage Areas
- #116 in Most Graduates Practicing in Primary Care
- #79 in Most Graduates Practicing in Rural Areas
- #18 nationally and #50 globally in Cardiac and Cardiovascular Systems

== Campuses ==
The University of Missouri–Kansas City School of Medicine operates two campuses. The Health Sciences District campus is situated in the Hospital Hill neighborhood of Kansas City, Missouri, alongside the UMKC schools of Dentistry, Pharmacy, and Nursing. The campus is closely linked to the University Health Truman Medical Center hospital complex and Children's Mercy Hospital. The Health Sciences District campus is attended by six-year B.A./M.D. students and M.D.-Only students.

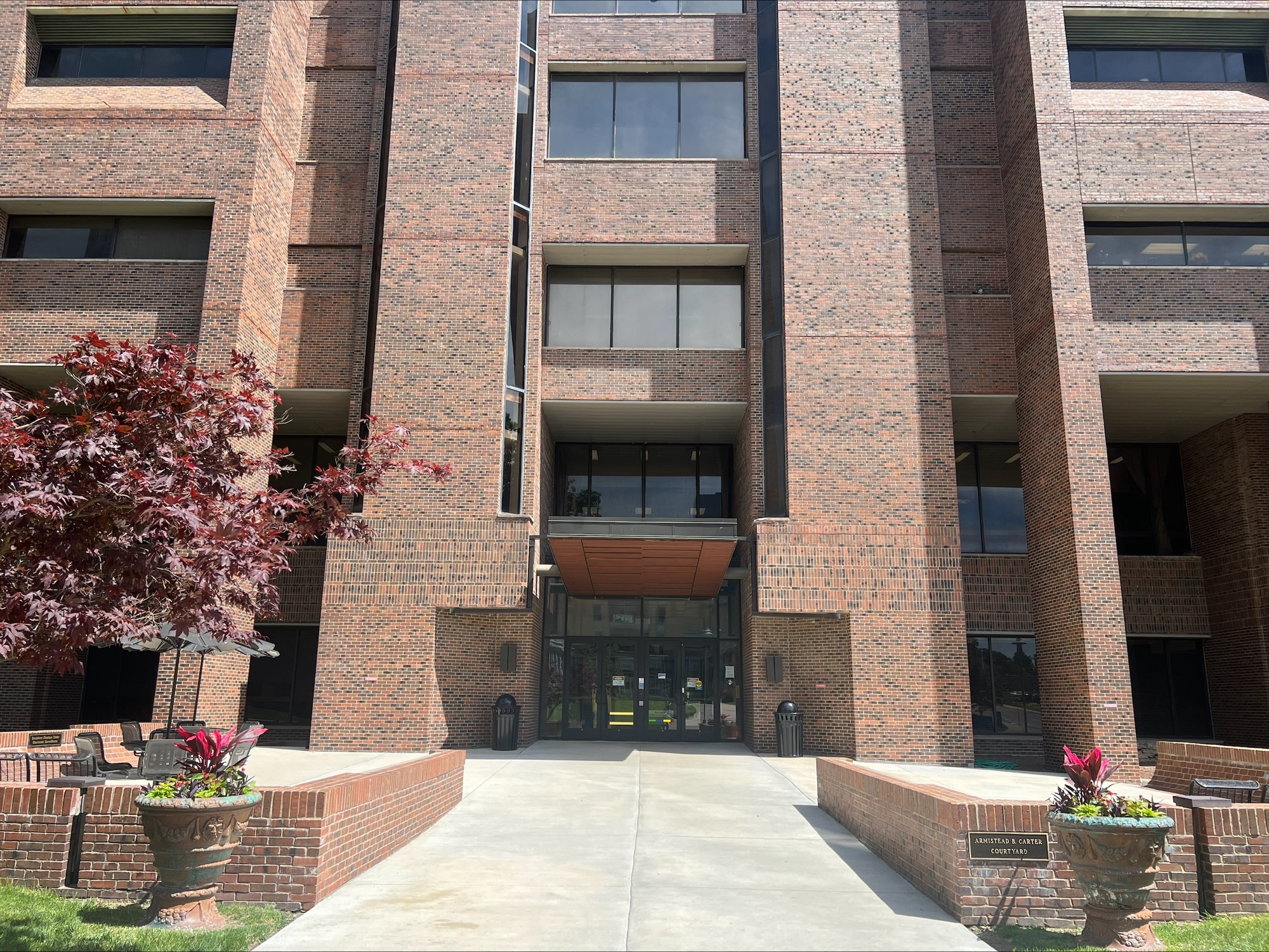
The main entrance of University of Missouri–Kansas City School of Medicine in the Health Sciences District.

The Health Sciences District is also the site of UMKC's Healthcare Delivery and Innovation Building, the university's largest capital project to date. Scheduled to open in 2027, the facility is planned to include medical simulation and digital-anatomy laboratories, instructional space, dental clinics, research facilities and interdisciplinary health-sciences programs.

The St. Joseph campus of the UMKC School of Medicine is situated in St. Joseph, Missouri. Its M.D. program has long operated out of Mosaic Life Care hospital, where students engage in rural health training and clinical rotations across regional sites.

In August 2025, UMKC officially opened a 22,000-square-foot medical education building on its own campus in St. Joseph. The building cost approximately $14.5 million, and includes classrooms, simulation labs, and exam spaces designed to support rural medicine education.

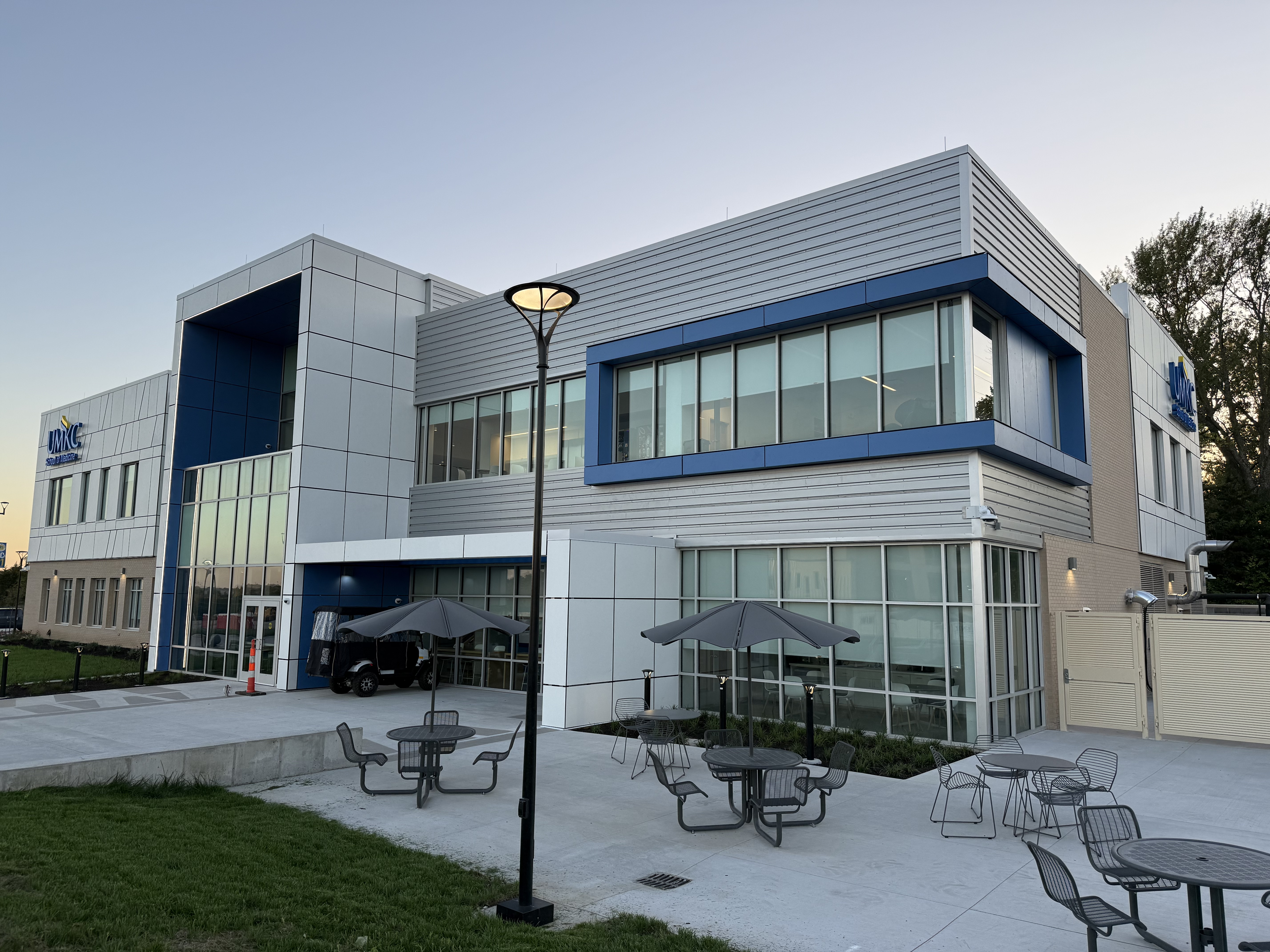
September 2025. University of Missouri–Kansas City School of Medicine St. Joseph Campus

== Admissions ==
For the Fall 2026 entering B.A./M.D. class at the University of Missouri–Kansas City School of Medicine, 1,181 completed applications were received, and 349 applicants were interviewed, representing an interview invitation rate of 29.6%. Of those interviewed, 150 (43.0%) were in-state applicants, 135 (38.7%) were regional applicants, and 64 (18.3%) were out-of-state applicants. The entering class had an average high school GPA of 3.96, an average ACT score of 34, and an average SAT score of 1510. B.A./M.D. applicants are required to take either the ACT or SAT but are not required to take the MCAT.

For the Spring 2027 entering M.D.-Only class, 588 completed applications were received, and 126 applicants were interviewed, representing an interview invitation rate of 21.4%. Of those interviewed, 61 (48.4%) were in-state applicants, 47 (37.3%) were regional applicants, and 18 (14.3%) were out-of-state applicants. A total of 29 students matriculated, representing 4.9% of completed applications and 23.0% of interviewed applicants. Of those matriculated, 17 (58.6%) were in-state students, 6 (20.7%) were regional students, and 6 (20.7%) were out-of-state students. The entering class had an average undergraduate GPA of 3.84 and an average MCAT score of 511. Unlike B.A./M.D. applicants, M.D.-Only applicants are required to take the MCAT.

== Education ==
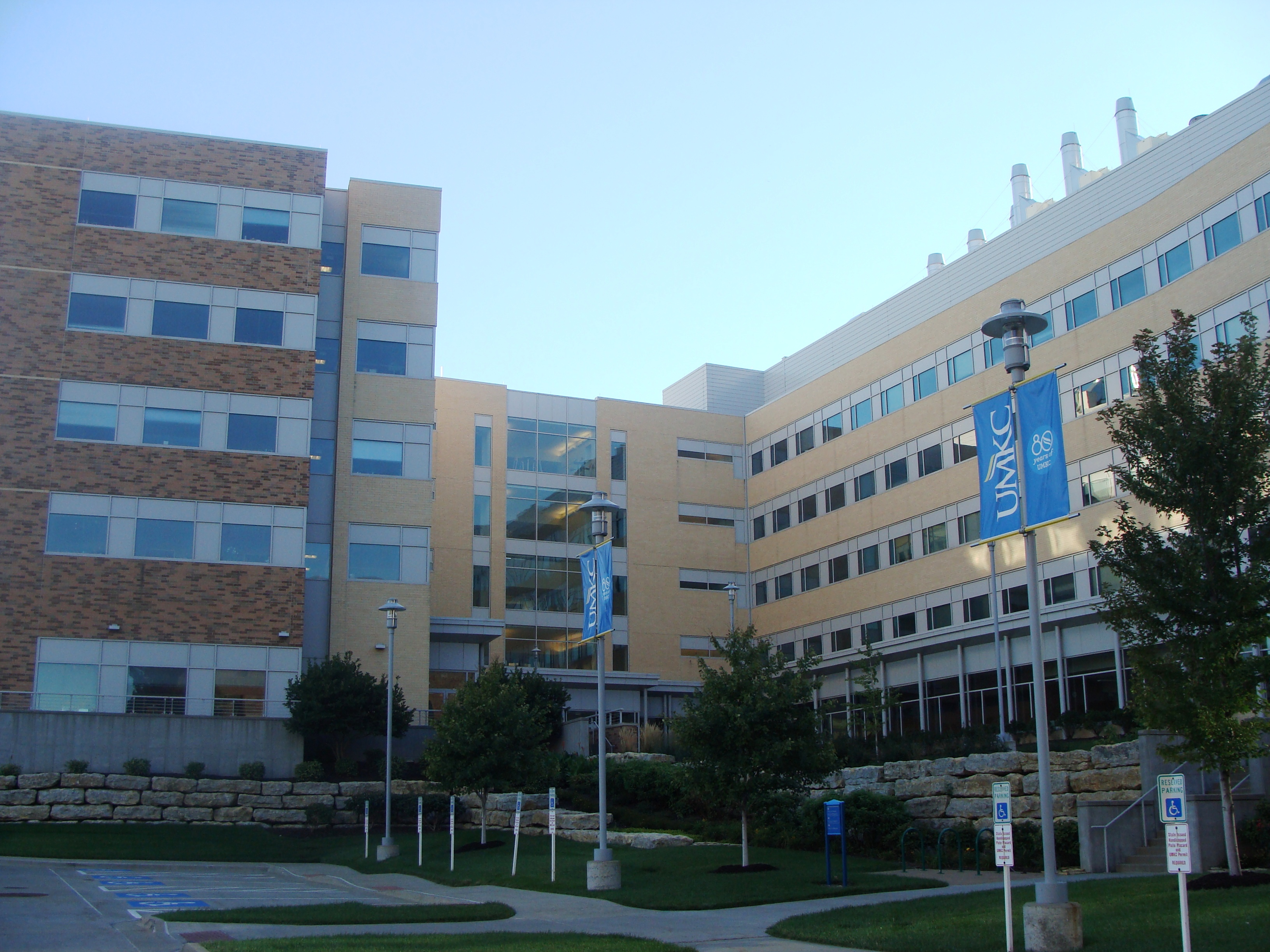
University of Missouri–Kansas City Health Sciences Building in the Health Sciences District.

In addition to the six-year B.A./M.D. program, the School of Medicine offers a traditional four-year Doctor of Medicine (M.D.), Master of Science in Anesthesia, Master of Medical Science Physician Assistant, Master of Science in Bioinformatics, Master of Health Professions Education, Interdisciplinary Ph.D., and graduate certificates.

Six-year B.A./M.D. and M.D.-Only students gain hands-on clinical experience immediately entering their respective programs through the docent system. Each student joins a "docent team" and follows a faculty physician or docent. In this educational environment, docents offer clinical instruction while mentoring students in their personal and professional growth.

In addition to the docent system, medical students in both six-year B.A./M.D. (Year Two) or M.D.-Only (Year One) began the Human Structure Function series in January. The Human Structure Function (HSF) series consists of integrated courses in anatomy, histology, embryology, physiology, and biochemistry of the various systems within the human body. Students are projected to complete the HSF I-IV series by the end of the summer semester in B.A./M.D. Year Two or M.D.-Only Year One.

Pre-clinical coursework at UMKC School of Medicine, including the HSF series, is one of eleven medical schools in the United States utilizing a letter grading scale. The utility of GPA has become a controversial policy in medical education. It draws criticism from students and clinical faculty due to its negative impact on student well-being during pre-clinical coursework.

== Columbia Physician Assistant Expansion ==
In January 2026, the School of Medicine expanded its Master of Medical Science Physician Assistant program to a second instructional site at the University of Missouri in Columbia. The site opened with 10 students and is planned to expand to 20 students by 2028.

== Mindfulness in Medicine ==
In 2025, the UMKC School of Medicine was designated a Flourishing in Medicine Center of Excellence by the University of Rochester Medical Center's Mindful Practice in Medicine program. At the time of the designation, UMKC was one of three schools internationally and the only school in the United States reported to hold the recognition. The broader Mindful Practice in Medicine program was founded in 2007 by Drs. Ronald Epstein and Mick Krasner. Its educational approach emphasizes self-awareness, reflective practice, attentive listening, and relationships with patients and colleagues.

The designation followed two years of development that included faculty training in mindful practice, continuing workshops, and the creation of a 10-month Mindfulness in Medicine program. UMKC's program was developed by Jodi Jackson, professor of pediatrics, and Christine Sullivan, associate dean for professional development. The extracurricular program brings medical students and faculty together for shared learning sessions focused on wellness, self-awareness, reflective listening, resilience, and patient relationships. Dr. Jackson, a neonatologist at Children's Mercy, directs the program. She is certified through the University of Rochester School of Medicine's Advanced Teacher Training Program for Mindful Practice in Medicine and serves on the broader program's faculty and advisory board.

Student presentations form a concluding component of the cohort experience. The program requirements asked students to prepare a presentation for their peers on a subject of their choice demonstrating their understanding and application of course material, with support from faculty facilitators. Students pursuing the "Distinction in Mindfulness in Medicine" commendation at graduation were also required to meet attendance requirements, complete written reflections, and receive faculty attestation of their engagement and participation.

Mindful Practice in Medicine describes its Centers of Excellence as certified healthcare institutions that provide programming intended to support the well-being of healthcare professionals. Its publicly listed certified centers include the University of Fribourg, the University of Calgary Cumming School of Medicine, and the UMKC School of Medicine. In October 2026, Children's Mercy reported that UMKC was one of six programs worldwide and remained the only program in the United States to hold the designation.

== Sojourner Health Clinic ==
UMKC-SOM runs a student-operated outpatient clinic called the Sojourner Health Clinic on Saturdays. It caters to the under-served adult population of Greater Kansas City, offering physical exams, prescription drugs, lab work, and various social services free of charge. The clinic sees more than 800 visits from underserved and uninsured patients annually. The Sojourner Health Clinic partners with Linwood United Church, Lazarus Ministries, University Health Primary Care Bess Truman Family Medicine Center, UMKC School of Medicine, UMKC Physician Assistant Program, UMKC School of Dentistry, UMKC School of Pharmacy, and Rockhurst Occupational Therapy Program.

== Stuber Health Center ==
The Stuber Health Center, formerly the Social Welfare Board Clinic, is "The oldest free and charitable clinic in the United States." It has been in operation since 1913. It provides medical, dental, and specialty services such as reproductive health to the uninsured residents of St. Joseph, Missouri, and Buchanan County. The Stuber Health Center had 4,995 primary care and 3,572 dental visits in 2023. It also provides a unique opportunity for medical students from UMKC School of Medicine to volunteer and make an elective in their curriculum.

== Hospital Affiliates ==
The UMKC School of Medicine maintains partnerships with several hospitals in both the Kansas City area and the St. Joseph region. Among its affiliates are:

- Center for Behavioral Medicine
- The Children's Mercy Hospital
- Kansas City VA Medical Center
- Research Medical Center
- Mosaic Life Care
- Saint Luke's Hospital of Kansas City
- University Health Behavioral Health
- University Health Bess Truman Family Medicine Center
- University Health Lakewood Medical Center
- University Health (formerly Truman Medical Center)
