= Donald R. Brown =

Donald Randolph Brown Sr. (died July 2009) was the first African American to attend dental school at the University of Missouri–Kansas City School of Dentistry in 1961, and the first to graduate, in 1965.

Racism and segregation were common at that time, and some of the school's patients would refuse to let the two African American students treat them. However, according to Jones, speaking in 2007, "Dean Hamilton Robinson and Assistant Dean Jack Wells refused to negotiate. "They would say, 'Either they work on you or nobody works on you.'"

Due to the tension of the times, Brown's name was "accidentally" omitted from the program on the day of his graduation, leaving his name off the program, and off the list of graduates in the local newspaper.

After graduation, Brown was sent to California to work at the Veteran's Administration Hospital (the VA) where people were "more progressive" and were more likely to accept "his kind". Brown lived his life disenfranchised from the school. The school's acknowledgement took place in the form of a ceremony hosted by Dental School Dean, Marsha Pyle, and Chancellor of UMKC Leo Morton.

== Legacy ==
Dean Pyle took the initiative to research the matter herself and found evidence corroborating what she was told by Brown's daughter. She found an archived version of the 1965 graduation program with Brown's name "crossed off." Dean Pyle took it upon herself to reach out to African American Chancellor of UMKC, Leo Morton. Together they hosted a posthumous ceremony in September, 2012, honoring Brown as the school's First African American Graduate. Brown's three children and grandchildren were present to accept the award, along with one of Brown's aunts who was present at the original graduation in 1965 when his name was omitted from the program. Brown's widow declined to attend, stating that she did not believe the whole "accident" story.
