= Mosaic Life Care at St. Joseph - Medical Center =

- Mosaic Life Care

Geography
- Location: St. Joseph, Missouri, United States
- Coordinates: 39°46′19″N 94°46′12″W

Organization
- Type: Teaching
- Affiliated university: University of Missouri–Kansas City School of Medicine
- Network: Mayo Clinic Care Network

Services
- Emergency department: Level II trauma center
- Beds: 358

Helipads
- Helipad: FAA LID: MU43

History
- Former names: Missouri Methodist Hospital Methodist Hospital; Methodist Medical Center Heartland Health
- Opened: 1924

Links
- Website: www.mymlc.com
- Lists: Hospitals in Missouri

Mosaic Life Care at St. Joseph - Medical Center is a non-profit, 358-bed hospital in St. Joseph, Missouri, United States, owned and operated by Mosaic Life Care. It serves as the flagship facility of the Mosaic Life Care health system and is the only tertiary hospital between Kansas City and Omaha. The hospital operates a Level II Trauma Center and a Level II Stroke Center and, together with its affiliated clinics, offers more than 60 hospital and area clinic locations that provide urgent, primary, specialty, and emergency care.

== Overview ==
Mosaic Life Care is described as a physician-led, patient-centered health system with hospitals in St. Joseph, Maryville, and Albany, Missouri, and clinics and medical centers throughout northwest Missouri, northeast Kansas, southeast Nebraska, and southwest Iowa. The system serves nearly 270,000 people across 35 counties and is the region's largest employer, with more than 5,000 caregivers. Mosaic is the only health care system in Missouri that is a member of the Mayo Clinic Care Network, a distinction that allows its hospitals and physicians to consult with Mayo Clinic specialists and incorporate Mayo Clinic research and diagnostic recommendations into patient care. In 2023, Mosaic implemented Epic as its electronic medical record (EMR) platform across the health system, including a patient portal powered by Epic's MyChart.

== History ==
After WWII, the two main competing hospitals in St. Joseph were St. Joseph Hospital (also known as Sisters Hospital) at 10th and Powell Streets and the newer Missouri Methodist Hospital at 8th and Faraon Streets, which opened in 1924. Adjacent to the Missouri Methodist Hospital at 9th and Faraon streets stood Mercy Hospital, a smaller 50-bed osteopathic hospital.

In 1956, Missouri Methodist Hospital purchased Mercy Hospital and, in 1957, converted it into a 35-bed annex to handle increased patient volume. The 1950s also saw the construction of Carder Hall, a dormitory for student nurses at Missouri Methodist Hospital, named in honor of Dr. Carder, the hospital's head at the time. In the 1960s, the hospital dropped "Missouri" from its name, becoming simply Methodist Hospital. This remained the name until the 1970s, when it was further renamed Methodist Medical Center.

In the late 1970s, St. Joseph Hospital determined it needed a new building. It purchased 39 acres of land at Riverside Road and Faraon Street and hired the architecture and engineering firm Henningson, Durham, and Richardson to oversee the construction of the new hospital. By 1983, Missouri Methodist Medical Center and St. Joseph Hospital had agreed to merge into a single organization, forming Heartland Health Affiliates. This led to the original downtown facility being renamed Heartland West. Heartland West experienced declining usage, was ultimately abandoned by Heartland Health, and was demolished in 2006.

In May 2012, the hospital joined the Mayo Clinic Care Network, expanding its healthcare partnerships. In June of that same year, the Heartland Health System announced it would begin the transition to a new name: Mosaic Life Care. The hospital was officially renamed on November 12, 2014.

The University of Missouri–Kansas City School of Medicine opened a regional campus at the hospital in January 2021 to address rural physician shortages in Missouri.

== Academic Medicine ==
Mosaic Life Care is home to one of the largest private rural primary care networks in the nation and serves as the host site for the University of Missouri–Kansas City School of Medicine (UMKC) campus in St. Joseph. The health system operates rural primary care clinics across Missouri (including Albany, Bethany, Cameron, Grant City, Maryville, New Hampton, Savannah, Stanberry, St. Joseph, and Trenton) and Kansas (including Atchison, Hiawatha, Sabetha, and Troy). Mosaic's rural health care network provides students with the rural clinical foundation for the UMKC MD program.

== Community Benefit and Population Health ==
Mosaic Life Care provides more than $43 million in direct community benefit annually and funds more than 20 organizations that impact population health and community well-being. The health system is a recipient of the Foster G. McGaw Prize, one of the most respected community service honors in health care. Mosaic offers access to FindHelp, a national database and search tool connecting community non-profits to population health resources, including housing, education, and food assistance, at no cost. The system has also developed extensive partnerships with community agencies to address barriers related to the Social Determinants of Health.

== Plaza 4 Expansion ==
In 2026, Mosaic Life Care opened Plaza 4, a new 90,000-square-foot outpatient facility located at 101 Mosaic Court in St. Joseph, Missouri. The facility was designed to consolidate a broad range of outpatient services under one roof, including primary care, pediatrics, specialty care, laboratory services, and pharmacy, with the stated goal of creating a more coordinated care experience for patients in the region.

Plaza 4 opened in multiple phases beginning in spring 2026. Phase 1a (April 20, 2026) brought outpatient imaging and an on-site coffee shop online, followed by Phase 1b (April 28, 2026) with the opening of the outpatient laboratory. Phase 2 (May 4-11, 2026) added specialty clinics, including podiatry, ear, nose, and throat (ENT), physical medicine and rehabilitation, nephrology, and endocrinology. Phase 3 (May 18, 2026) opened primary care clinics, with Phase 4, a retail and specialty pharmacy, scheduled for early June 2026.

The facility spans three floors. The first floor houses outpatient imaging, the outpatient laboratory, and a retail pharmacy with drive-through service. The second floor contains internal medicine, family care, and pediatrics clinics. The third floor houses ENT, endocrinology, nephrology, outpatient physical therapy, physical medicine and rehabilitation, and podiatry. The building includes an MRI suite, two CT scanner suites, three X-ray suites, six ultrasound rooms, 130 exam rooms, a rehabilitation gym, two hearing sound booths, and six outpatient blood draw bays. Additional amenities include self-check-in kiosks, on-site valet services, EV vehicle charging, and on-site guest relations support.
