= University of Missouri–Kansas City =

Public research university in Kansas City, Missouri, U.S.

Coordinates: 39.033547°N 94.575578°W

- Former name: List: Kansas City School of Law (1895-1938); Kansas City Dental College (1881-1919); Western Dental College (1890-1919); Kansas City-Western Dental College (1919-1941); Kansas City College of Pharmacy (1885-1943); Kansas City Conservatory of Music (1906-1959); Horner Institute for Fine Arts (1914-1926); University of Kansas City (1933-1963)
- Motto: Salus populi suprema lex esto (Latin)
- Motto in English: "Let the welfare of the people be the supreme law"
- Type: Public research university
- Established: October 1, 1933; 93 years ago
- Parent institution: University of Missouri System
- Accreditation: HLC
- Academic affiliations: CUMU; GCU; USU; Space-grant
- Endowment: $254 million (2026) (UMKC only)
- Budget: $501.17 million (FY 2027)
- Chancellor: C. Mauli Agrawal
- Provost: Jennifer Lundgren
- Administrative staff: 847 (2026)
- Total staff: 3,812 (2026)
- Students: 15,238 (fall 2026)
- Undergraduates: 11,218 (fall 2026)
- Postgraduates: 4,110 (fall 2026)
- Location: Kansas City, Missouri, U.S.
- Campus: 157-acre (0.2 sq mi; 63.5 ha); Large City
- Other Campuses: Springfield; St. Joseph
- Newspaper: Roo News
- Colors: Blue and gold
- Nickname: Roos
- Sporting affiliations: NCAA Division I – Summit League
- Mascot: Kasey the Kangaroo
- Website: umkc.edu

The University of Missouri–Kansas City (UMKC or Kansas City) is a public research university in Kansas City, Missouri, United States. UMKC is part of the University of Missouri System and includes a medical school and a law school. For the 2026-2027 academic year, the university's enrollment was nearly 15,300 students. It offers more than 125 degree programs in 12 academic units and is classified as a "Research 1: Very High Research Spending and Doctorate Production" institution. UMKC is also home to the School of Dentistry, Missouri's only public dental school.

== History ==
=== Lincoln and Lee University ===
The school has its roots in the Lincoln and Lee University movement first put forth by the Methodist Church and its Bishop Ernest Lynn Waldorf in the 1920s. The proposed university (which was to honor Abraham Lincoln and Robert E. Lee) was to be built on the Missouri–Kansas border at 75th and State Line Road. Proponents of the school said it would be a location "where North met South and East met West".

In 1930, after the Methodists had brought the Kansas City Dental School into their fold, the two plans were merged. The new school was to be called "Lincoln and Lee, the University of Kansas City", and plans were underway to develop it into a four-year school.

The university was built on a 40-acre (16.19 ha) plot, southeast of the Nelson mansion. William Volker had purchased and donated this land for the University of Kansas City. The original Volker purchase did not include the Dickey mansion itself. Dickey died unexpectedly in 1931 and Volker acquired it to be the first building.

=== University of Kansas City ===
The two groups were to squabble back and forth, with Ernest H. Newcomb attempting to mediate. The Church did not maintain its ties, and the Lincoln and Lee name was abandoned. The school announced that it would start if 125 students enrolled. The target was met, and the University of Kansas City, or "KCU" for short, held its first classes in October 1933 with a faculty of 17 and a student enrollment of 264.

The campus (now expanded to 90 acres or 36.4 hectares) is called the Volker Campus. The Dickey mansion is now Scofield Hall. The second building on the campus, the library, was named for Newcomb. A Carl Milles fountain on Brush Creek opposite the Nelson Gallery is called the Volker Fountain.

The University of Kansas City grew quickly, and soon incorporated other existing local private institutions of higher learning. The Kansas City School of Law, which was founded in the 1890s and located in downtown Kansas City, merged into the university in 1938. The Kansas City-Western Dental College followed in 1941 and the Kansas City College of Pharmacy merged in 1943. This was followed by the Kansas City Conservatory of Music in 1959. During this period, the university also established the School of Administration in 1953, the School of Education in 1954, and the Division for Continuing Education in 1958.

=== University of Missouri–Kansas City ===
On July 25, 1963, at the urging of alumnus Hilary A. Bush, the university became part of the University of Missouri System and $20 million of assets including 23 buildings were transferred to the University of Missouri. At the time, KCU had 3,300 students (2,000 full-time) and 175 full-time faculty.

At the time Missouri already owned the campuses in Columbia and Rolla. Accordingly, the university's name was changed to the University of Missouri–Kansas City. After this, UMKC established the School of Graduate Studies in 1964, the School of Medicine in 1970, the School of Nursing in 1980, the School of Basic Life Sciences in 1985 (which was renamed the School of Biological Sciences in the mid-1990s), and the School of Computing and Engineering in 2001.

In 2012, the school conducted studies on whether to rename the school back to the University of Kansas City (while still remaining in the University of Missouri system). In November 2012, the school decided against the change noting at the time, "while prospective students and the community at large had strong interest in the name change, several other important groups — current students, faculty/staff, and alumni — do not favor a name change at this time."

In the mid and late 2010s, UMKC came under fire for corruption and cover-ups that alleged a pursuit of outside money above all else. Critics highlighted examples in the management school and pharmaceutical school, including a faculty member who required international students to perform personal tasks for him and false information used to rank the business school.

In February 2025, UMKC was classified as an R1 doctoral university with very high research activity by the Carnegie Classification of Institutions of Higher Education. It became the first university in Kansas City to receive the R1 designation.

== Academics ==
Undergraduate demographics as of Fall 2023
Race and ethnicity	Total
White	48%
Hispanic	16%
Black	14%
Asian	11%
Two or more races	5%
International student	4%
Unknown	1%
Economic diversity
Low-income (Note: The percentage of students who received an income-based federal Pell grant intended for low-income students.)	39%
Affluent (Note: The percentage of students who are a part of the American middle class at the bare minimum.)	61%

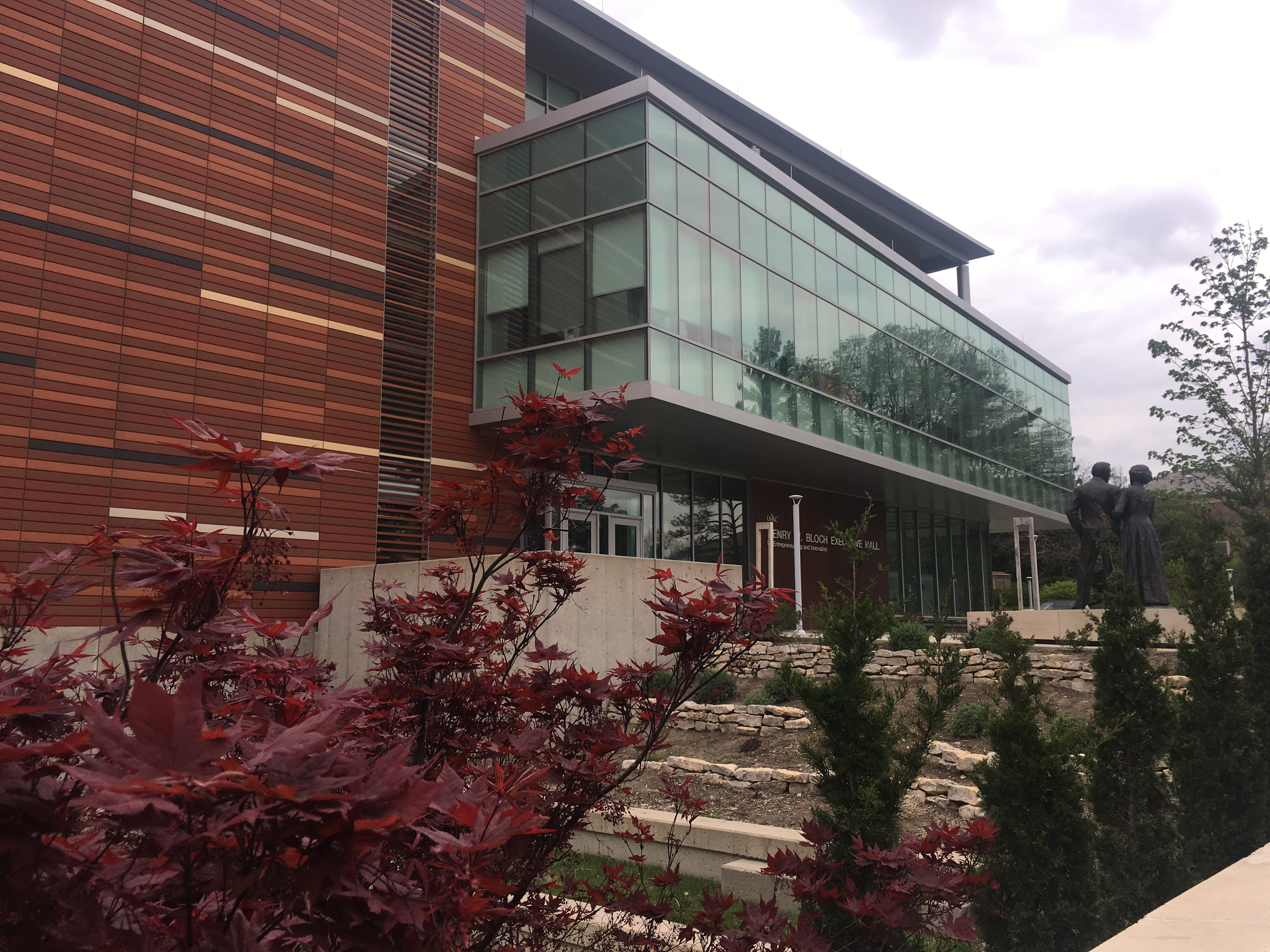
Bloch School of Executive Management

Today, the academic divisions of UMKC are as follows:

- the Conservatory
- the Henry W. Bloch School of Management
- the School of Science and Engineering
- the School of Dentistry
- the School of Education, Social Work and Psychological Sciences
- the School of Humanities and Social Sciences
- the School of Law
- the School of Medicine
- the School of Nursing and Health Studies
- the School of Pharmacy
- the School of Graduate Studies

The school of medicine is known for its six-year post-secondary program, wherein a student spends six years obtaining both a Bachelor of Arts and Doctor of Medicine degree. The school operates two campuses, one in Kansas City, Missouri, and one in St. Joseph, Missouri. The school in Kansas City, Missouri, is known as the Health Sciences District campus or HSD. It is situated away from the main campus on Hospital Hill, where it is connected to University Health Truman Medical Center, an extensive research hospital. The St. Joseph campus (STJ) is based in St. Joseph, Missouri. Students initially trained within Mosaic Life Care hospital facilities, but in August 2025 UMKC opened a new 22,000-square-foot, $14.5 million medical education building. The facility houses classrooms, simulation labs, and clinical training spaces, and serves as a hub for expanding rural health education.

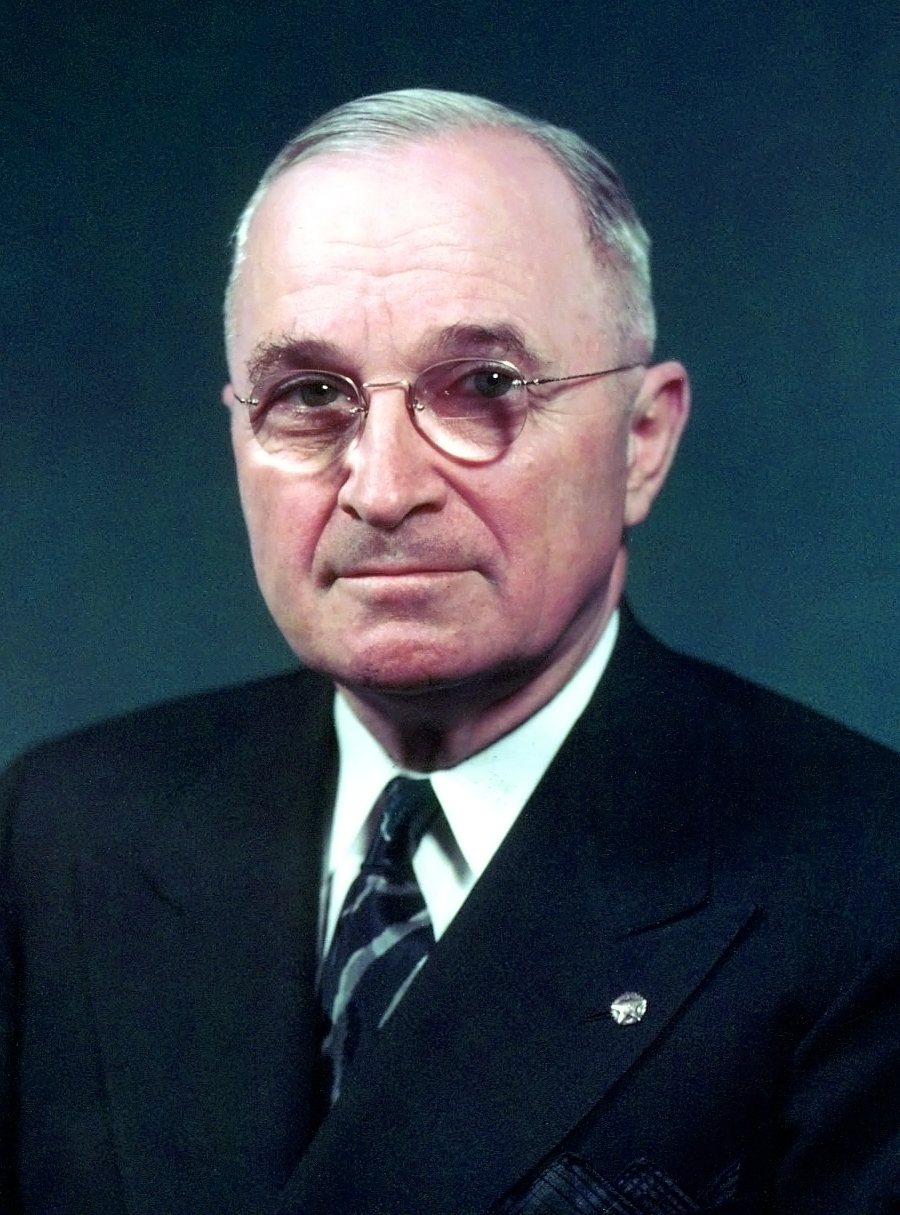
Harry S. Truman

The University of Missouri-Kansas City School of Law is one of four law schools in Missouri (St. Louis University School of Law, University of Missouri School of Law, and Washington University School of Law are the others). It is one of only seven American law schools to have educated both a President of the United States (Harry S. Truman) and a Justice of the Supreme Court of the United States (Charles Evans Whittaker). Truman attended but did not graduate from the law school and never practiced law.

The university is the home of New Letters, a literary magazine, as well as the nationally syndicated public radio program New Letters on the Air. For over 50 years, UMKC has broadcast live, taped, and syndicated programming over KCUR, the university's radio station and NPR affiliate.

In 2004, the Fungal Genetics Stock Center moved to UMKC where it is in the School of Biological Sciences. The FGSC was founded in 1960 and is supported by the US National Science Foundation. The FGSC distributes research materials around the world, and is part of the World Federation for Culture Collections. Collaborators include researchers at the Broad Institute and the US Department of Energy Joint Genome Institute.

The university is the site where the Supplemental Instruction program was established and developed.

== Research ==
UMKC received the Carnegie R1 classification for institutions with very high research activity in 2025. Under the Carnegie methodology used for the 2025 classification, R1 institutions were required to spend at least $50 million annually on research and development and award at least 70 research doctorates. UMKC was one of 187 institutions receiving the classification and was the first R1 university in Kansas City.

In July 2026, the National Science Foundation (NSF) selected the UMKC-led Critical Materials Crossroads Engine as one of 12 new NSF Regional Innovation Engines. The initiative is intended to develop a regional ecosystem for domestic production and processing of critical materials used in transportation, energy, communications and national security. The project received an initial $15 million for its first two years and may receive up to $160 million over ten years if it meets NSF performance milestones.

== Rankings ==
As of the 2026 U.S. News & World Report Best Colleges rankings, the University of Missouri–Kansas City was ranked:

- #250 (tie) in National Universities
- #137 (tie) in Top Public Schools
- #56 (tie) in Nursing

Schools are ranked according to their performance across a set of widely accepted indicators of excellence.

UMKC's Bachelor of Science in Nursing program was also ranked the No. 1 public-university nursing program in Missouri in rankings released in September 2026.

Academic rankings

National
- Forbes: 256
- U.S. News & World Report: 250
- Washington Monthly: 635
- WSJ/College Pulse: 257

== Athletics ==
UMKC's mascot is Kasey Kangaroo (originally drawn by Walt Disney). Historically, UMKC athletics had used the identity of "UMKC Kangaroos," but the short form "Roos" was widely used both within and outside of the program. On July 1, 2019, the athletic program officially rebranded itself as the Kansas City Roos. The school's colors are old gold and royal blue. It is a member of the NCAA's Division I Summit League, having rejoined that conference on July 1, 2020, after seven years in the Western Athletic Conference.

The men's soccer team won the Summit League men's soccer championships in 1996, 1999, 2001, 2003, and 2010. The team set an NCAA record on October 12, 2001, with the fastest trio of goals scored in Division I soccer during the MLS era, by scoring three times in 1:46 against Valparaiso University. Notable Roos soccer players have included goalkeepers Kevin Corby and Connor Sparrow, defenders Roberto Albuquerque and Coady Andrews, forwards Levi Coleman, Eric McWoods, and Jordan Rideout, and midfielders Manny Catano, Jony Muñoz, and Bryan Pérez.

UMKC sponsors 16 sports for both men and women at the intercollegiate level. The department sponsors: men's basketball and women's basketball, men's soccer and women's soccer, men's tennis and women's tennis, men's golf and women's golf, men's indoor and outdoor track & field and women's indoor and outdoor track & field, men's cross country and women's cross country, softball, and volleyball.

Beginning with the 2026–27 season, the men's basketball team plays its full home schedule at Municipal Auditorium in downtown Kansas City. The women's basketball team splits its home schedule between Municipal Auditorium and the Swinney Recreation Center on the Volker Campus.

In April 2007, the school dropped its Co-Ed Rifle Program in order to add women's soccer and men's baseball. Women's soccer was added to the institution for the 2009–10 school year.

== Campuses ==
UMKC is spread across multiple locales; the main Volker Campus, home to the majority of university operations, is located in Kansas City, Missouri's Rockhill neighborhood, east of the Country Club Plaza, and adjacent to both the Stowers Institute for Medical Research and the Linda Hall Library. In 2017 the university, in collaboration with University Health Truman Medical Center, Children's Mercy Hospital, the Missouri Health Department, the Jackson County Medical Examiners Office, and the Missouri Department of Mental Health Behavioral Medicine, formed the UMKC Health Sciences District on Hospital Hill. This district is a first-in-the-nation partnership between local and state governments, the university, and these nationally recognized healthcare faculties, designed to promote collaboration in research, innovation, education, grant funding, and community outreach, for the advancement of health and wellness in the greater Kansas City metropolitan area. Also in 2017, the university announced plans to expand its metropolitan identity with the construction of a downtown Campus for the Arts, located near the Kauffman Center for the Performing Arts.

=== Volker Campus ===
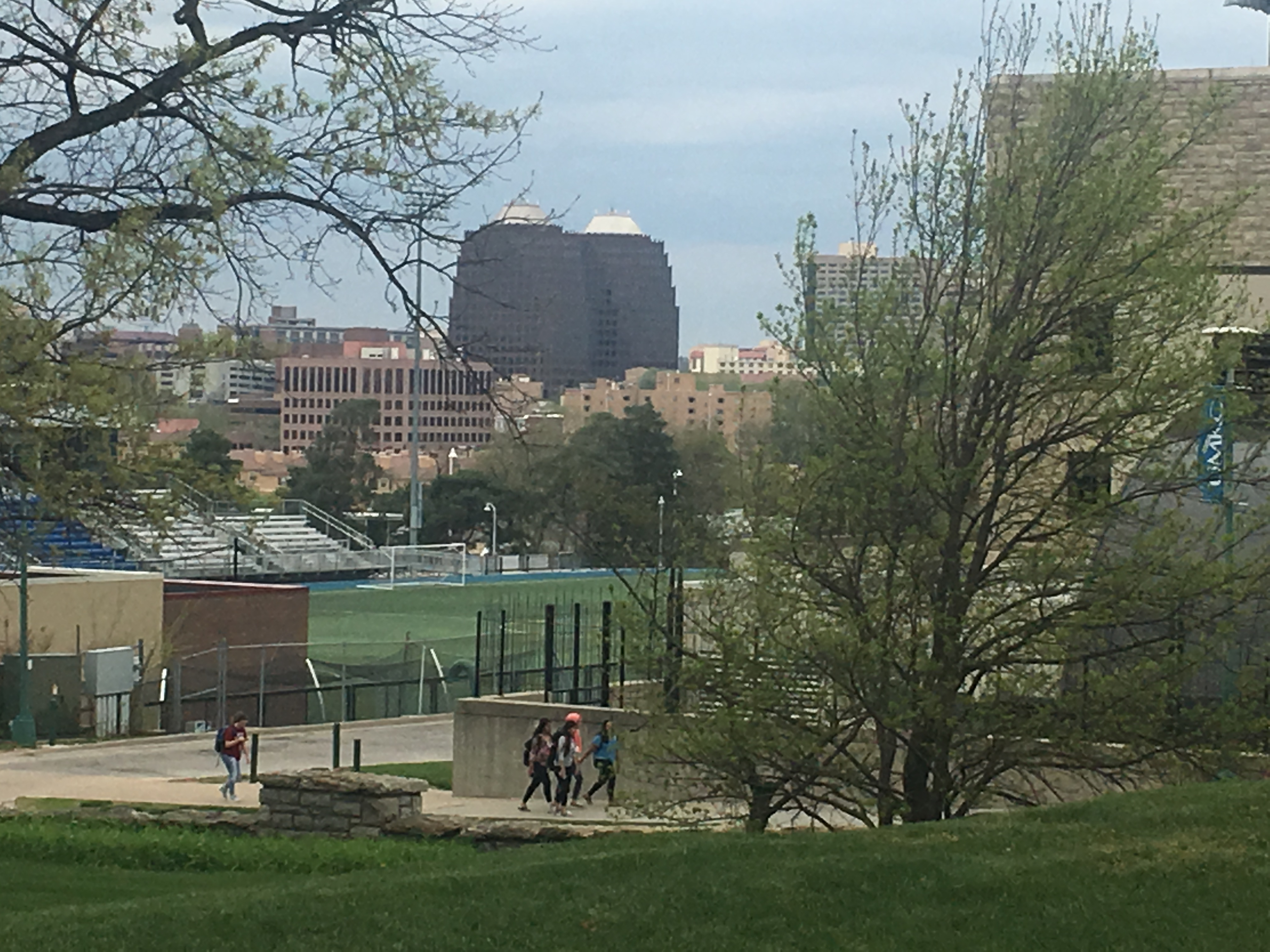
Durwood Stadium is located in the middle of campus. The Plaza is in the background.

UMKC has two campuses in Kansas City. Most of UMKC's main campus (Volker campus) is inside a square formed by Volker Boulevard (north), Oak Street (west), 53rd Street (south), and Troost (east). The Health Sciences District campus houses the health sciences academic departments. Directly across Troost from UMKC is Rockhurst University, a Jesuit university.

On October 24, 2025, the KC Streetcar Main Street Extension opened, extending the system 3.5 miles south from Union Station to a new southern terminus at 51st Street and Brookside Boulevard adjacent to UMKC. The extension connected the Volker Campus directly with the Country Club Plaza, Midtown, Crossroads and downtown Kansas City.

=== Health Sciences District Campus ===
The Health Sciences District campus houses the School of Nursing, the School of Medicine, the School of Dentistry, and the School of Pharmacy.

Construction began in 2024 on the Healthcare Delivery and Innovation Building at 25th and Charlotte streets. The five-story, 160,000-square-foot facility has a project cost of approximately $145 million and is the largest capital improvement project in UMKC history. Planned facilities include dental clinics, medical simulation and digital-anatomy laboratories, classrooms, biomedical engineering space and interdisciplinary research facilities. The building is expected to open in 2027.

=== St. Joseph Campus ===
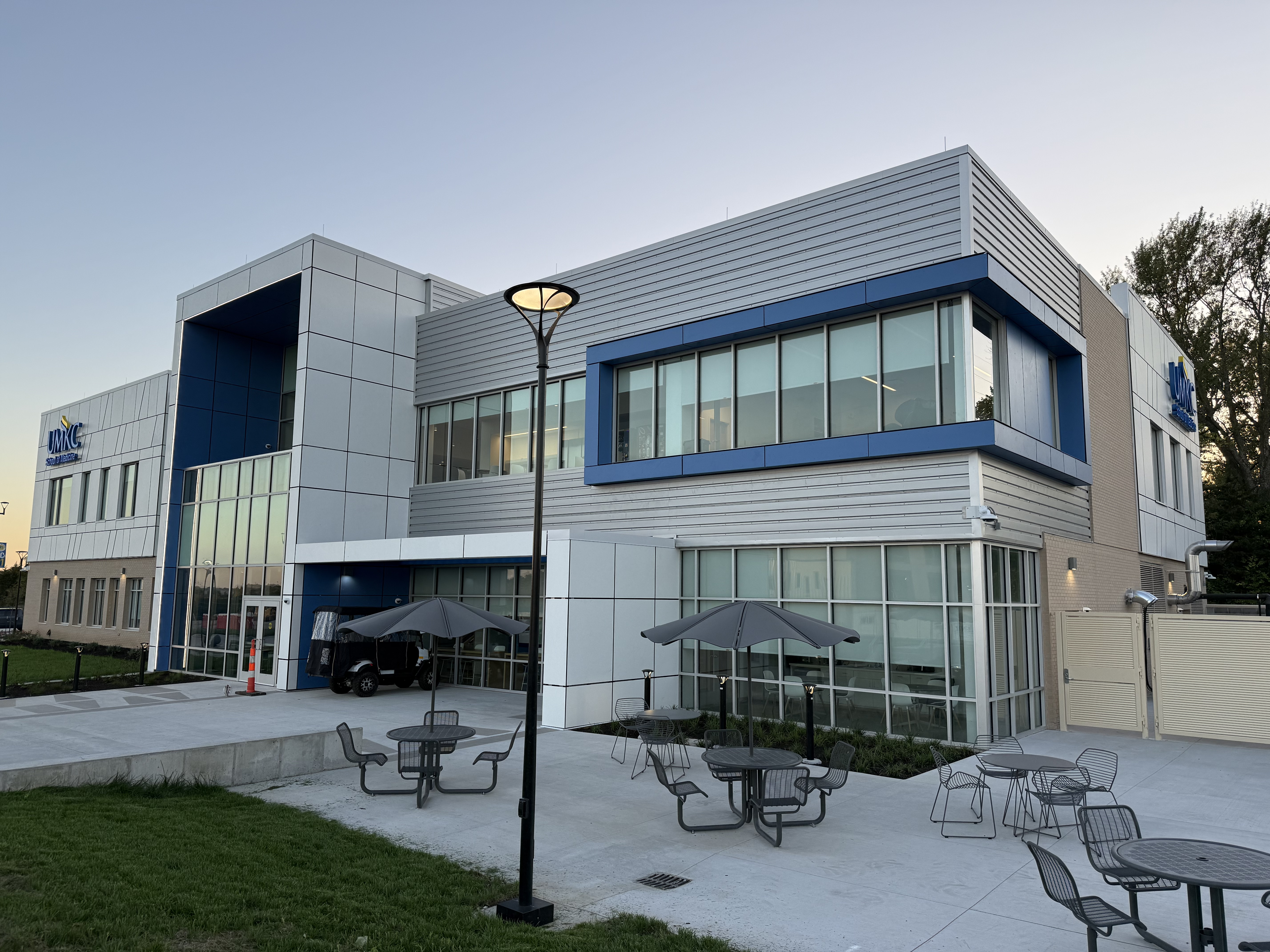
September 2025. University of Missouri–Kansas City School of Medicine St. Joseph Campus

The UMKC School of Medicine–St. Joseph campus opened a new 22,000-square-foot, $14.5 million medical education building in August 2025. Located in St. Joseph, Missouri, the facility includes classrooms, simulation labs, and clinical training spaces designed to expand rural health education.

=== Buildings ===
==== Biological Sciences Building ====
Built in 1972, the Biological Sciences Building is located north of the Spencer Chemistry Building and east of Katz Hall. The building houses offices, classrooms, and research laboratories of the School of Biological Sciences. The school offers undergrad, grad, and doctoral degrees in the life sciences. The Biological Sciences Building and Spencer Chemistry Building are connected on four of its floors; in addition to this, the south stairwell on the basement floor of the Biological Sciences Building is the north stairwell of the Spencer Chemistry Building.

==== Fine Arts Building ====
The Fine Arts Building was built in 1942 and remodeled in 1975. Currently, the Art and Art History departments use the building. Student works are often displayed in the building's UMKC Gallery of Art.

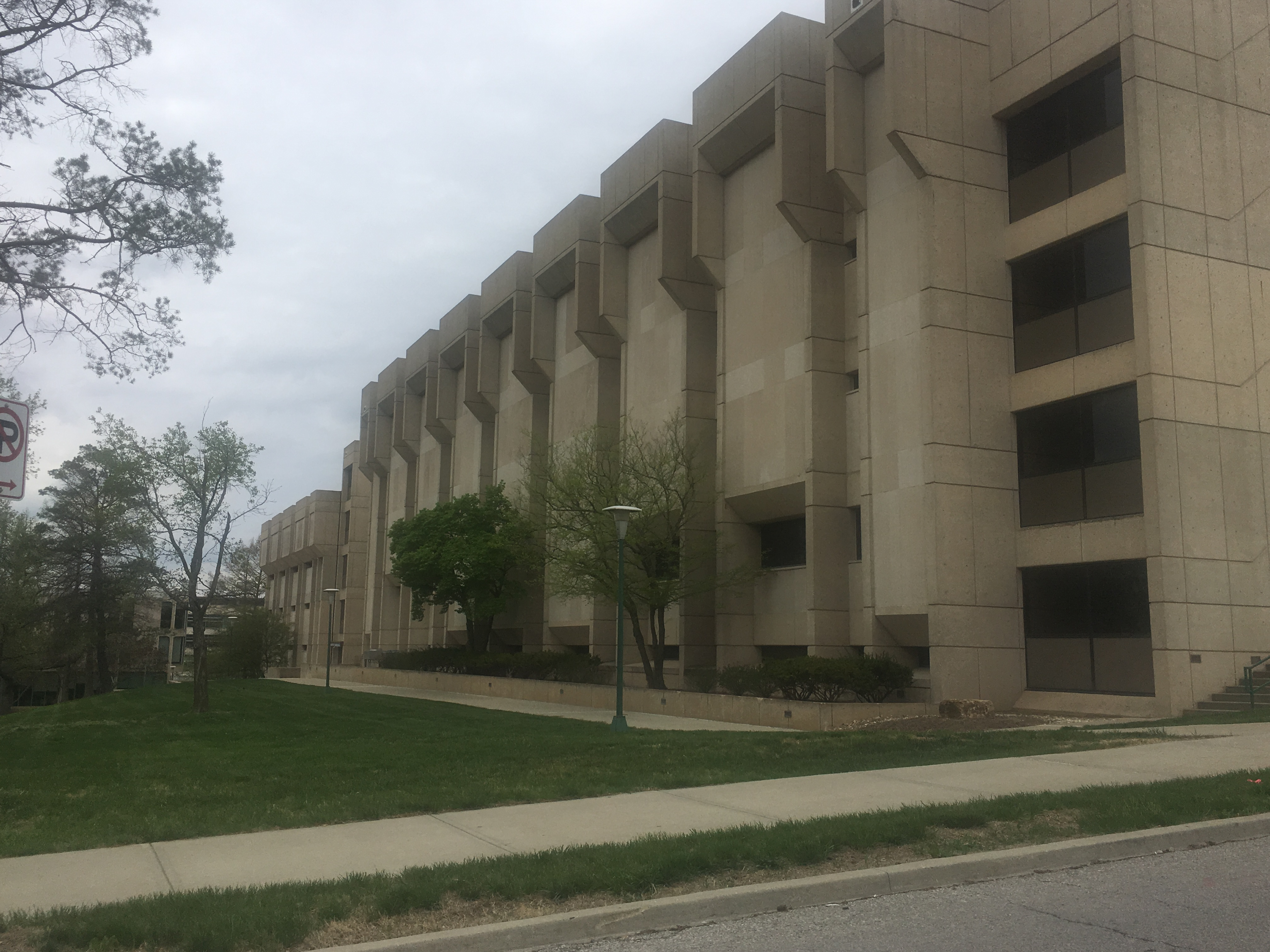
Spencer Chemistry

==== Spencer Chemistry Building ====
The building, located at 51st & Rockhill, was built in 1972 using funds donated by Helen Spencer. The purpose of the building was to nurture scientific advancement at UMKC. It currently houses the main office of the Chemistry Department, as well as several chemistry laboratories and classrooms. Spencer Chemistry Building and the Biological Sciences Building are connected on four of its floors.

==== The Quad ====
The majority of UMKC's students regularly attend classes in buildings on the Quad. These buildings are Flarsheim Hall, Newcomb Hall, Manheim Hall, Royall Hall, Haag Hall, and Scofield Hall.

==== Cockefair Hall ====
Cockefair, (pronounced coke-fair), is located on Rockhill across from Flarsheim Hall. It was built in 1950 and is named for former faculty member Carolyn Cockefair, who was a humanities professor at UMKC. The building currently houses the departments of History, English, and Philosophy.

==== Flarsheim Hall ====
Flarsheim Hall was built in 1999, and is the largest building on UMKC's campus. The Chemistry, Physics, and Geosciences departments, as well as the School of Computing and Engineering, are located in Flarsheim Hall. The hall was named after Robert H. Flarsheim, who left a $9 million endowment to the university in his estate. Flarsheim Hall is located on the northeast corner of the Quad.

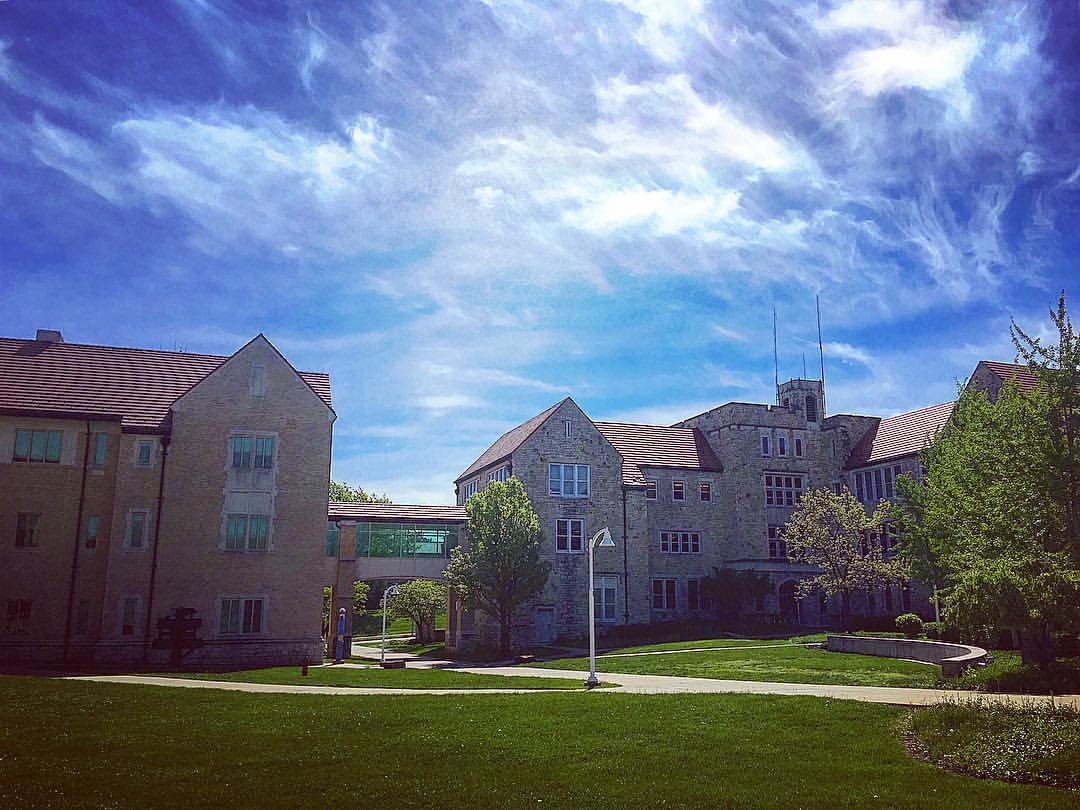
Haag Hall

==== Haag Hall ====
Haag Hall (pronounced Hāg), built in 1937, contains offices and classrooms including the departments of mathematics and communication studies. Its most recognizable features are large murals stretching along the main stairwell. Haag Hall is connected to both Royall and Flarsheim Halls. Haag Hall is located on the southeast corner of the Quad.

==== Katz Hall ====
Completed in 1965, Katz Hall is named in honor of Isaac and Michael Katz, founders of a major Kansas City drug store chain. The building currently houses the Department of Architecture, Urban Planning + Design's offices and classrooms, and was once the location for the School of Pharmacy. The Pharmacy School has moved to the Health Sciences Building on UMKC's Hospital Hill campus, approximately four miles north of the Volker Campus.

==== Manheim Hall ====
Manheim Hall, along with Newcomb Hall were the first two buildings originally built for the university. It is named for Ernest Manheim, a professor of sociology, who taught at the university and founded its sociology program. Currently, Manheim Hall houses offices. It is connected to Royall Hall by a second-floor walkway. Manheim is located on the southwest corner of the Quad.

==== Newcomb Hall ====
Newcomb Hall (built in 1936) was named after the first manager of the university, Ernest H. Newcomb. Originally designed to house the library, Newcomb Hall is now home to offices, the University Archives, the Western Historical Manuscript Collection and the Edgar Snow Collections. Newcomb Hall is located on the extreme west edge of the quad.

==== Royall Hall ====
Royall Hall was built in 1968 and is almost exclusively classrooms. Two large lecture halls are on the ground floor, and an astronomical observatory is on the roof. Also on the ground floor is a lounge area with an Einstein Bros. Bagels. Royall Hall is connected to both Manheim and Haag Halls, and to a five-level parking structure across the street. Royall Hall is located on the south end of the Quad.

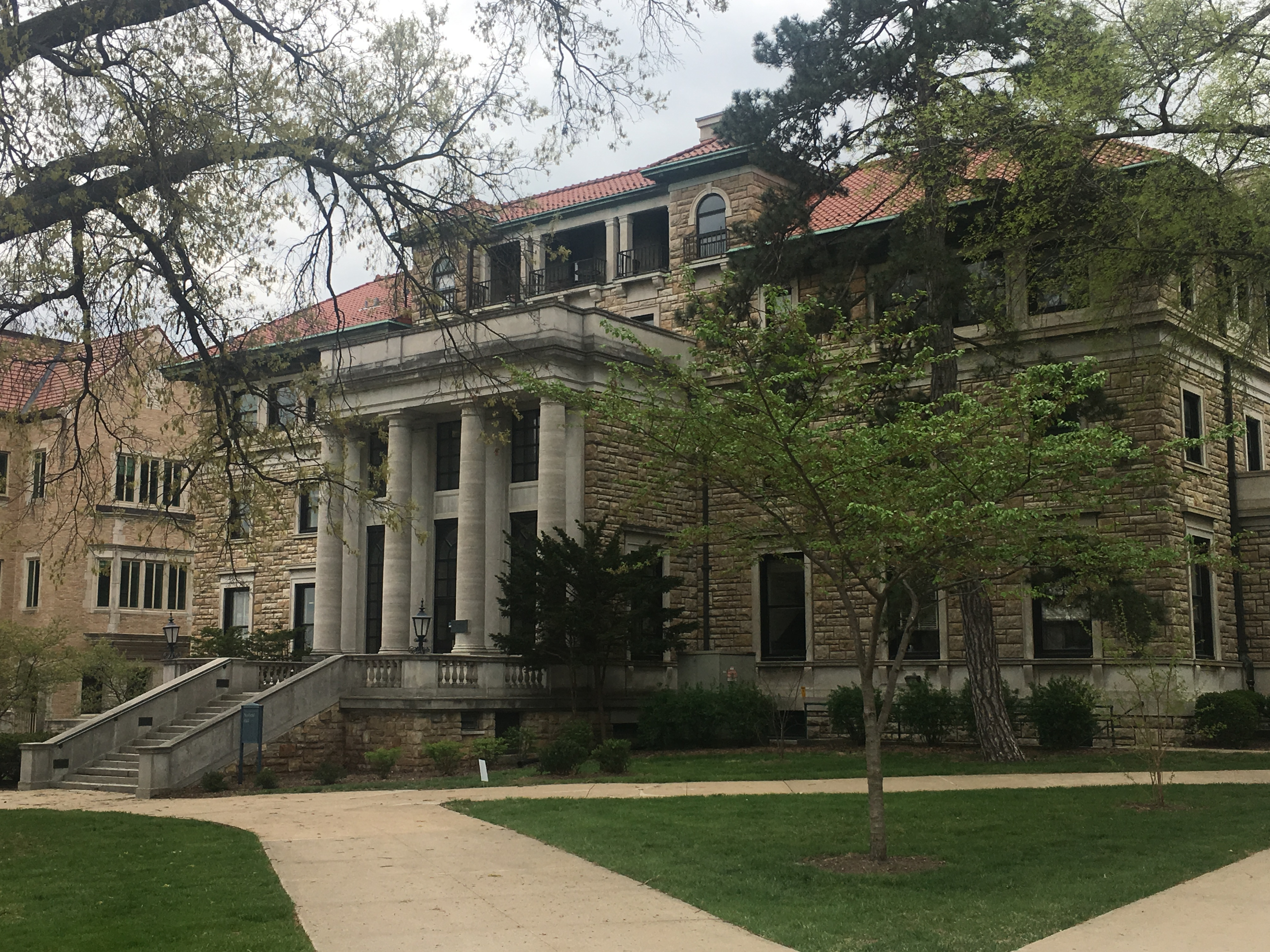
Scofield Hall at UMKC

==== Scofield Hall ====
Scofield Hall was built in 1912, and was originally a private residence. In 1931, William Volker acquired it and donated it to the university. It was named after Carleton Scofield, who was chancellor of the university when it merged with the University of Missouri System. The Arts & Sciences advising office as well as the Language Resource Center and the Department of Foreign Languages & Literatures are located in Scofield Hall. Scofield Hall is located on the north end of the Quad.

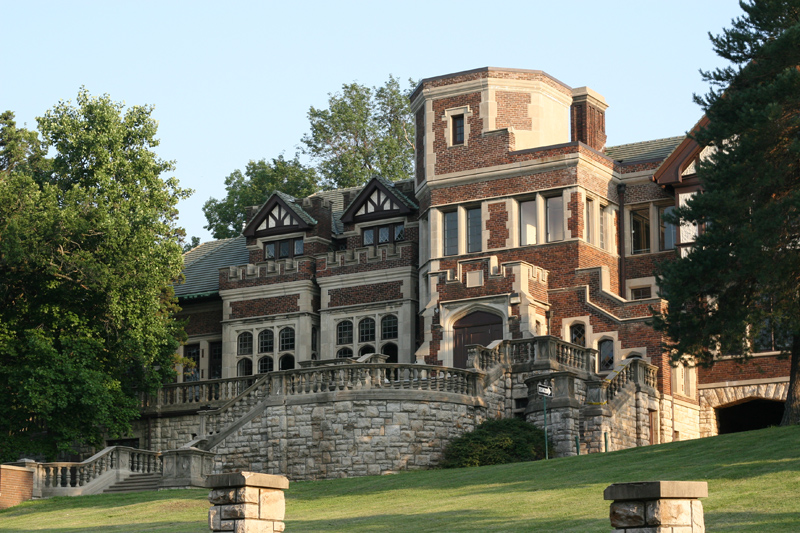
Epperson House

==== Epperson House ====
Epperson House is located south of 52nd St. between Oak and Cherry. The Tudor-Gothic structure was completed in 1923 at a cost of $450,000. Originally built as a private residence, Epperson House contained 48 rooms, six bathrooms, elevators, a swimming pool, and a billiard room, spread through four floors. The residence was built by Uriah S. Epperson, who was a banker, industrialist, and philanthropist who amassed significant wealth from insurance and meat-packing industries. The building was donated to the university in 1942 for use as a men's dormitory until 1956. Epperson is well known for its apparent hauntings, which earned it a spot on Unsolved Mysteries as one of the top five haunted houses in the United States. The house now sits vacant and unused, awaiting incite from the chancellor on what it will be used for next.

==== University Center and Atterbury Student Success Center ====
The University Center, known as the "U-Center", was built in 1961. The student dining hall is located here, as is Pierson Auditorium, an often used site for career fairs or luncheons. In 2012, the University Center underwent renovations and was rededicated as the Atterbury Student Success Center. It was designed to promote student academic success.

UMKC undertook another major renovation of the Atterbury Student Success Center in 2025–2026, consolidating admissions, advising, career services and other student-support functions and creating a new university welcome center.

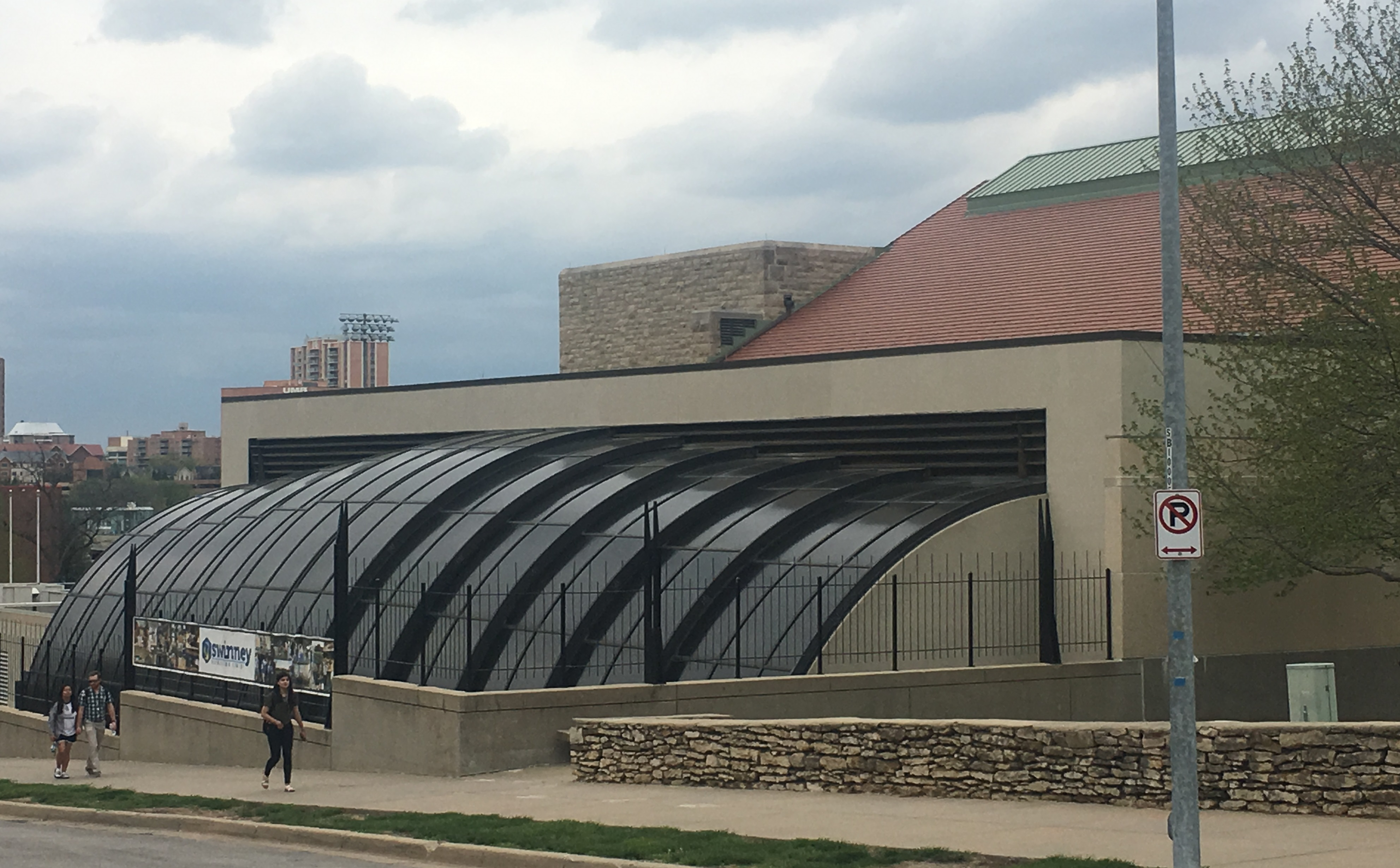
Swinney Recreation Center

==== Swinney Recreation Center ====
Swinney Recreation Center was built in 1941, and was gifted to the university by E. F. Swinney. There are five basketball courts, an Olympic-sized swimming pool, racquetball and squash courts, weight-training center, soccer field, and indoor and outdoor tracks at the recreation center. Along with the Kansas City Club and the Pembroke Hill School, Swinney is one of only three locations in Kansas City containing squash courts. University students, faculty and staff have access to the center, and paid memberships are open to others.

==== James C. Olson Center for the Performing Arts ====
Known on campus simply as the PAC, or Performing Arts Center, this building partially houses the Conservatory of Music and Dance and the Department of Theatre, as well as the Kansas City Repertory Theatre. The PAC, designed by Kivett and Myers, opened in 1979 and contains White Recital Hall, Helen F. Spencer Theatre, and a black box theatre space, Studio 116.

On September 23, 2026, UMKC broke ground on a $41 million expansion of the James C. Olson Performing Arts Center. The first phase consists of a 35,000-square-foot addition with new music rehearsal and performance spaces, two dance rehearsal rooms, theatre facilities and gathering areas. Construction of the first phase is expected to take approximately 18 months.

== Student activities ==
=== Greek life ===
Greek Life at the University of Missouri–Kansas City includes some 24 Greek Letter Organizations. Although the Greek population is relatively small, it maintains a proud heritage, and several chapters have received awards from their organization's international offices.

=== Traditions ===
==== Hobo Day and Bum Friday ====
One of the best known traditions in the history of UMKC was Hobo Day, later known as Bum Friday. The campus-wide event was created as Hobo Day, and it first occurred on May 8, 1935, to celebrate the end of the spring semester. Students dressed as hobos throughout the day, and various events and competitions took place. In 1982, the Student Life Office put a stop to Bum Friday and replaced it with "Roo Fest", which lacked many of the activities and traditions of Bum Friday and its predecessor, Hobo Day.

==== The Bounder Bells ====
Alumni members of the former Bounders Fraternity raised nearly $30,000 in donations for the purchase of a Van Bergen 49-bell carillon. The Bounder Bells was dedicated on the UMKC campus in May 1989. The carillon is located in the tower of the Swinney Recreation Center. The bells controlled by an electronic keyboard, and they ring on the hour. The bells can also be programmed to play melodies.

== Notable alumni and faculty ==
=== Chancellors ===
Since 1933, 14 persons have led the University of Missouri–Kansas City or its predecessor, the University of Kansas City, plus an additional 7 individuals in an acting or interim capacity. The most current leader is C. Mauli Agrawal.
