= University Health Lakewood Medical Center =

Geography
- Location: 7900 Lee's Summit Road, Kansas City, Missouri, United States
- Coordinates: 38°58′31″N 94°23′40″W

Services
- Emergency department: Yes
- Beds: 110

Helipads
- Helipad: FAA LID: 7MO0

History
- Former name: Truman Medical Center-Lakewood

Links
- Website: www.universityhealthkc.org/locations/university-health-lakewood-medical-center/
- Lists: Hospitals in Missouri

University Health Lakewood Medical Center is a 110-bed acute care and outpatient hospital located in Kansas City, Missouri.

== History ==
The origins of University Health Lakewood Medical Center began in 1851 with the purchase of 160 acres in eastern Jackson County, Missouri to create a "poor farm" by the Jackson County courts to "care for poor persons". In 1906, a $250,000 bond issue was passed to build a hospital on the poor farm site. The cornerstone was laid for Patterson Hall, later known as "The Jackson County Home for the Aged and Infirm" in 1908. In 1928, Jackson County Court presiding judge Harry S. Truman advocated for the establishment of a public hospital in addition to the existing care home. On October 24, 1930, the 88-bed hospital was opened to the public and by 1937, the "Rural Jackson County Emergency Hospital" was providing 24-hour emergency services. In 1976, the Jackson County legislature changed the name of the hospital to Truman Medical Center-East. The hospital has undergone several expansions, including a $24 million expansion between 1995 and 1997, and a $38 million 175,000-square foot expansion in 2003. In 2021, the hospital changed its name to University Health Lakewood Medical Center.

== Facilities ==
In addition to traditional hospital facilities, the hospital also houses a level II neonatal intensive care unit (NICU), an onsite dental clinic and the University Health Lakewood Care Center, a 188-bed long-term care facility.

== See also ==
- University Health Truman Medical Center
