= University Health Truman Medical Center =

Hospital in Kansas City, Missouri, United States

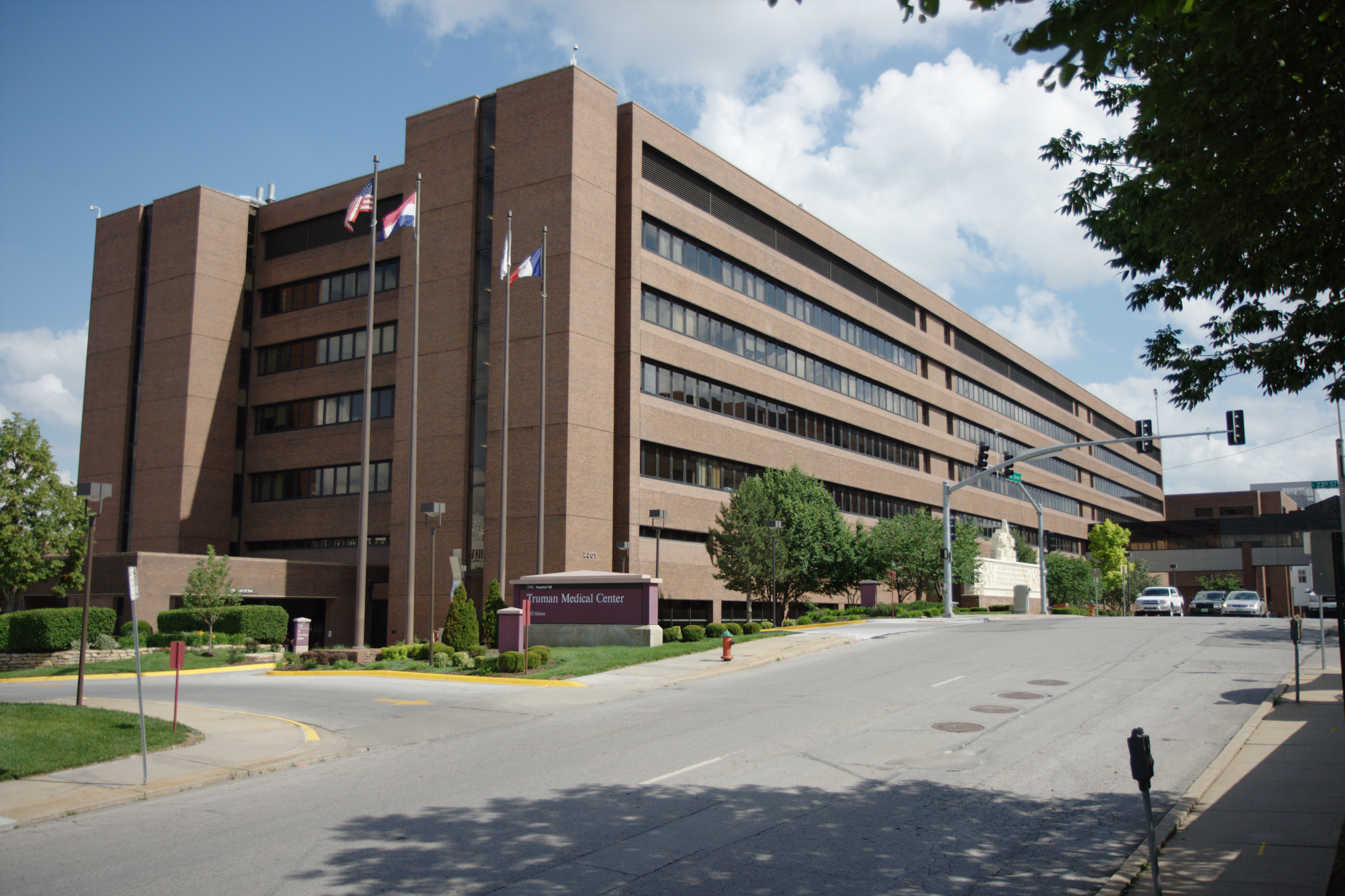
- University Health Truman Medical Center is on Hospital Hill. The catwalk on the right connects to the Hospital Hill Center and the Diagnostic and Testing Center.

Geography
- Location: 2301 Holmes Street, Kansas City, Missouri, United States
- Coordinates: 39°5′3″N 94°34′35″W

Organization
- Affiliated university: University of Missouri–Kansas City (UMKC) School of Medicine

Services
- Emergency department: Level I trauma center
- Beds: 238

Helipads
- Helipad: FAA LID: MO05

History
- Former names: Truman Medical Center–Hospital Hill; TMC Hospital Hill
- Opened: 1870

Links
- Website: www.universityhealthkc.org/locations/university-health-truman-medical-center/
- Lists: Hospitals in Missouri

University Health Truman Medical Center, previously Truman Medical Center–Hospital Hill (abbreviated TMC Hospital Hill), is a 238-bed acute care and outpatient hospital located in Kansas City, Missouri, United States.

University Health Truman Medical Center has one of the busiest adult emergency departments (EDs) in the Kansas City metropolitan area with more than 60,000 visits a year. It is located in Downtown Kansas City, across from Children's Mercy Hospital and connected via a skybridge, having access for pediatric transfers when necessary.

The hospital is affiliated with the University of Missouri–Kansas City (UMKC) School of Medicine and provides training base for its four- and six-year medical programs.

The facility is equipped with diverse clinical services including general surgery, orthopedic surgery, cardiology, radiology, and emergency care.

== History ==
The origins of University Health Truman Medical Center began in 1870 with the construction of City Hospital at 22nd Street and McCoy Avenue (now Kenwood Avenue) in Kansas City.

Voters approved a bond issue in 1903 to fund the construction of a new larger General Hospital because the 175-bed hospital was deemed insufficient for the growing city.

In 1905, Thomas Swope donated 4.5 acres of land on Gillham Road between 23rd and 24th Streets.

In 1908, the new 600-bed General Hospital opened.

A new racially segregated hospital was built in 1930, with old General Hospital No. 1 being for white patients and new General Hospital No. 2 becoming the "colored division".

The hospitals merged in 1957, and the newly integrated hospital eventually became the teaching hospital for the newly established University of Missouri–Kansas City School of Medicine.

The hospital officially opened at its present-day location in 1976.

On December 30, 1986, a fire ignited in a patient's room in the hospital due to smoking, ultimately resulting in the death of two patients. The fire caused the evacuation of over 50 patients, and several staff members and medical students required treatment for smoke inhalation.

In 2021, the hospital changed its name from Truman Medical Center-Hospital Hill to University Health Truman Medical Center.

== See also ==
- Over the Edge (1999) § Owen Hart accident – A WWF match at Kemper Arena, in which a wrestler fell and was transported to TMC, but later died from his injuries
- Owen Hart § Death – More information about the same accident
- University Health Lakewood Medical Center
