= Children's Mercy Hospital =

Children's hospital in Kansas City, Missouri, U.S.

Children's Mercy

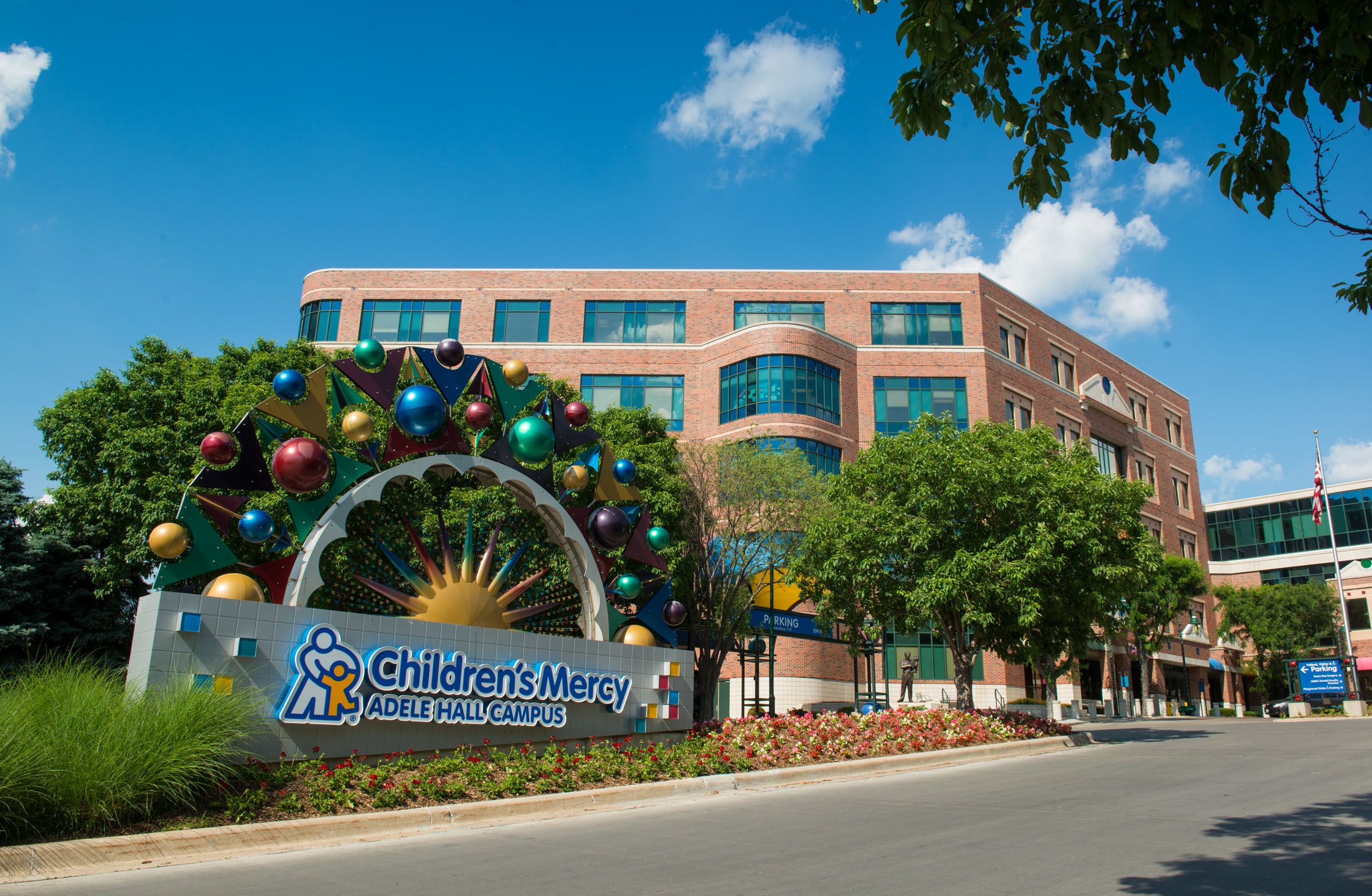
- Adele Hall Campus

- Location within Missouri

Geography
- Location: 2401 Gillham Road, Kansas City, Missouri, United States
- Coordinates: 39.085°N 94.580°W

Organization
- Care system: Private
- Type: Specialized
- Affiliated university: University of Kansas; University of Missouri-Kansas City

Services
- Emergency department: Yes (Adele Hall Campus and Children's Mercy Hospital Kansas)
- Beds: 390

Helipads
- Helipad: Yes (two at Adele Hall Campus and one at Children's Mercy Hospital Kansas)

History
- Founded: 1897

Links
- Website: www.childrensmercy.org
- Lists: Hospitals in Missouri

Children's Mercy is a 408-bed independent pediatric health system headquartered in Kansas City, Missouri. It includes hospitals and specialty clinics in Missouri and Kansas and is the only freestanding children's hospital within 200 miles. The health system provides pediatric specialty and subspecialty care and operates the Children's Mercy Research Institute, which focuses on pediatric translational research. Children's Mercy has been recognized by U.S. News & World Report in nine pediatric specialties. The hospital was the first in Missouri or Kansas to receive Magnet Recognition for Excellence in Nursing Services from the American Nurses Credentialing Center and has been re-designated six times.

Children's Mercy Adele Hall Campus is the primary location for Children's Mercy. The hospital was founded in 1897 by two sisters, a surgeon and a dentist. In fiscal year 2025, the hospital provided care for patients from all 50 states and from 20 countries around the world. The campus is also home to the patient progression hub, a hospital operations center that uses AI-enabled technology, predictive analytics and real-time information to optimize care progression and coordination from the time a patient’s admission is requested until discharge.

== History ==
=== Berry sisters ===
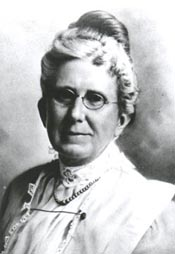
Alice Berry Graham

Katharine and Alice Berry came to Kansas City from Wisconsin in 1893. They put each other through school; Katharine being the first to get her medical degree while Alice worked as a schoolteacher, and then obtained her dentist degree—both male-only professions during the 19th century. The women were excluded from professional medical groups because of their gender, and their entrepreneurial spirit was discouraged. But the two persevered and, due to their widowed status, they were permitted to control their own finances, which they poured into their medical work with children.

Children's Mercy Hospital was founded in 1897 when Katharine Berry Richardson, a surgeon, and her sister Alice Berry Graham, a dentist, found a crippled, malnourished girl abandoned in the streets of Kansas City, Missouri and treated and cared for her at a rented bed in a hospital. Since no hospital in the city allowed a female physician on the staff, the sisters continued treating patients by renting beds in a small hospital.

The beds soon became known as the "Mercy Bed". The sisters formed the Free Bed Fund Association for Crippled, Deformed, and Ruptured Children and in 1901, changing it to The Children's Mercy Hospital in 1919.

At first, the public ridiculed the sisters' work, especially the Berry sisters' belief of women-only staffers. Some people believed women should work in the home and not be physicians. But as societal norms changed, the ridicule lessened and public opinion allowed the hospital to grow.

The sisters bought a home in 1903 to work as a hospital, sheltering children. The sisters and few staff members asked the community for supplies, volunteers, and monetary support. Dr. Kate (Katharine Richardson) would keep a sign near the street, letting the public know the needs of the hospital, such as new sheets, pillow cases, bath towels and canned food.

In 1915, construction on what would be the first official hospital began at Independence Avenue. The hospital stayed on the avenue until 1970, when it moved to its current location on Hospital Hill.

When Hurricane Katrina first hit New Orleans in August 2005, Children's Mercy (along with other hospitals) sent helicopters to Tulane Medical Center, Ochsner, and CHNOLA in order to help evacuate pediatric patients from the hospital. Along with helicopters, CMH sent two C-130s to aid in large scale evacuation of pediatric patients from New Orleans.

Children's Mercy is a nonprofit organization that partners with community members, raising money to support access to pediatric care and research in the heart of America.

=== Timeline ===
Significant events in the hospital's history include:

- 1897: The Free Bed Fund Association of Sick, Crippled, Deformed and Ruptured Children opened its doors with one rented bed on June 24.
- 1901: Central Governing Board of the Free Bed Fund approves the Mercy name.
- 1903: Officially called Mercy Hospital, the new hospital opens in its own building with five beds at 414 Highland Avenue.
- 1917: The hospital moves to Independence and Woodland on November 27.
- 1970: Hospital staff moves 39 children to the hospital's current location, on Hospital Hill 2401 Gillham Road.
- 1995: Five-story Hall Family Outpatient Center opens
- 1996: The seven-story Herman and Helen Sutherland Inpatient Tower open.
- 1997: Children's Mercy South opens in Overland Park, Kansas in October.
- 2000: The Paul and Betty Henson Patient Tower, a complement to the Sutherland Tower, opens.
- 2003: Awarded Magnet designation for nursing excellence, the first hospital in Missouri or Kansas and just the third children's hospital to achieve this honor from the American Nurses Credentialing Center.
- 2003: Pediatric Research Center opens on the top two floors of the new Clinic and Research Building on Hospital Hill.
- 2004: Children's Mercy South expansion opens. Renamed Children's Mercy Hospital - Kansas in 2015
- 2009: Bioethics Center opens.
- 2012: Children's Mercy East opens in Independence, Missouri
- 2012: The Elizabeth Ann Hall Patient Tower opens on Hospital Hill.
- 2012: Children's Mercy opens the Center for Pediatric Genomic Medicine.
- 2013: Children's Mercy Blue Valley opens in Overland Park, Kansas, housing urgent care and sports medicine services, including a gym for sports therapy and rehabilitation.
- 2013: Children's Mercy Wichita, a regional referral center opens in Wichita, Kansas.
- 2015: Children's Mercy performs its first heart transplant.
- 2020: Children's Mercy Furlough's 575 Employees and permanently lays off 60 for the first time in the history of the hospital.
- 2021: Children's Mercy opens the Children's Mercy Research Institute in a new, 9-story, 375,000 square-foot building.
- 2022: Children's Mercy recognizes 125th anniversary.
- 2023: Children’s Mercy announces major initiative to address pediatric mental health crisis.
- 2025: Children’s Mercy announces breakthrough in personalized therapy for rare genetic diseases.
- 2025: Children’s Mercy announces $152M expansion plan for Children’s Mercy Hospital Kansas.
- 2025: Children’s Mercy and Mercy announce plans to partner and expand pediatric care in southwest Missouri.
- 2026: Children’s Mercy announces a new acute care tower will be built at Adele Hall Campus to meet growing pediatric needs.
- 2026: Children’s Mercy opens new multispecialty outpatient clinic in Wichita, Kansas.

== Locations ==
Children's Mercy has multiple sites of care, including one hospital in Overland Park, Kansas and another in downtown Kansas City, Missouri. Children’s Mercy opened a new multispecialty outpatient clinic in Wichita, Kansas in the summer of 2026. The Children’s Mercy with Mercy O’Reilly Pediatric Center in Springfield, Missouri is anticipated to open in December 2026. The health system also includes Urgent Care locations in Overland Park, Kansas and in Kansas City and Independence in Missouri. In March 2026, Children’s Mercy opened its first Express Care and Orthopedic Injury Clinic, Children's Mercy Liberty.

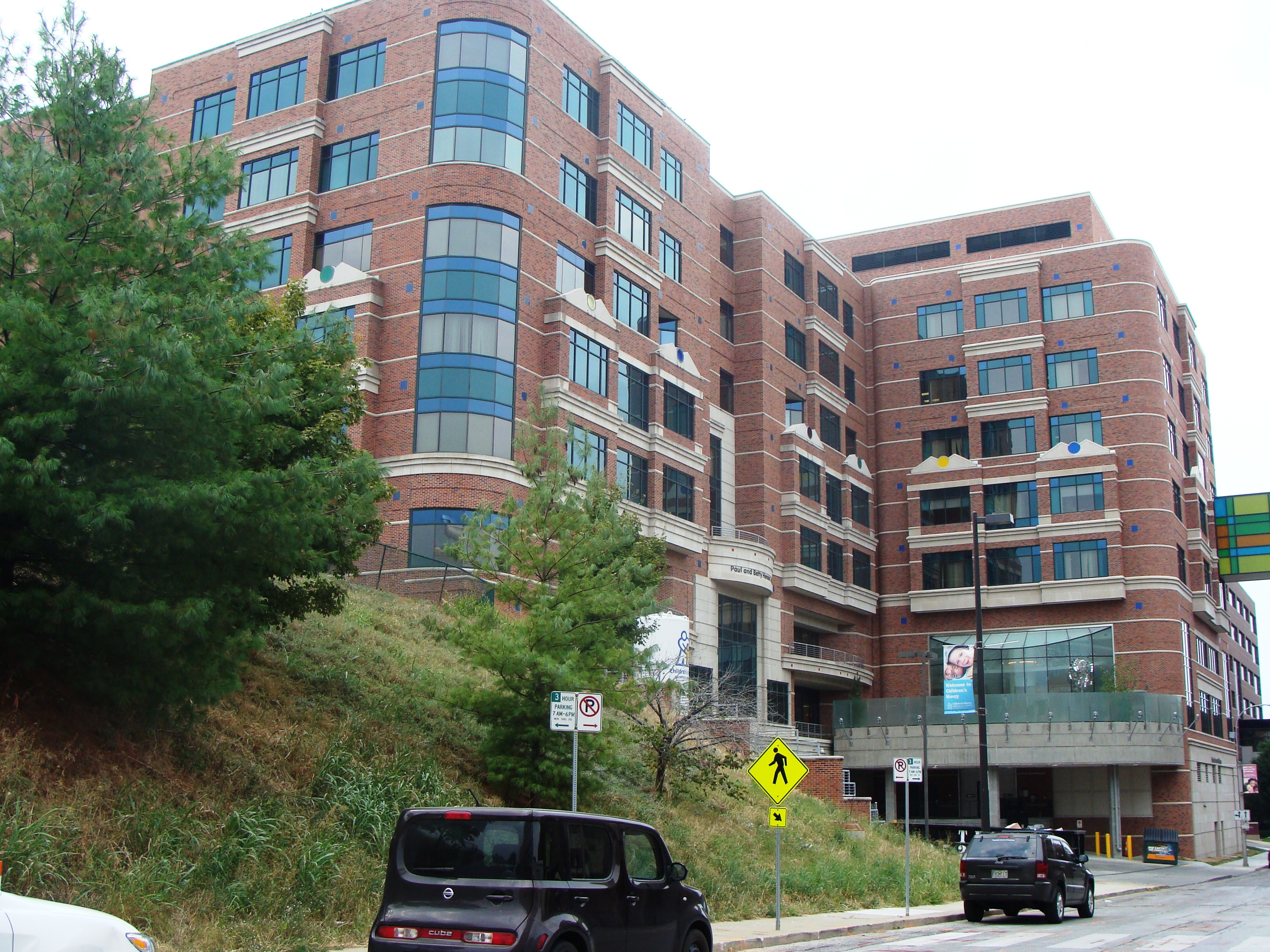
Adele Hall campus is the site of the main hospital in downtown Kansas City, Missouri.

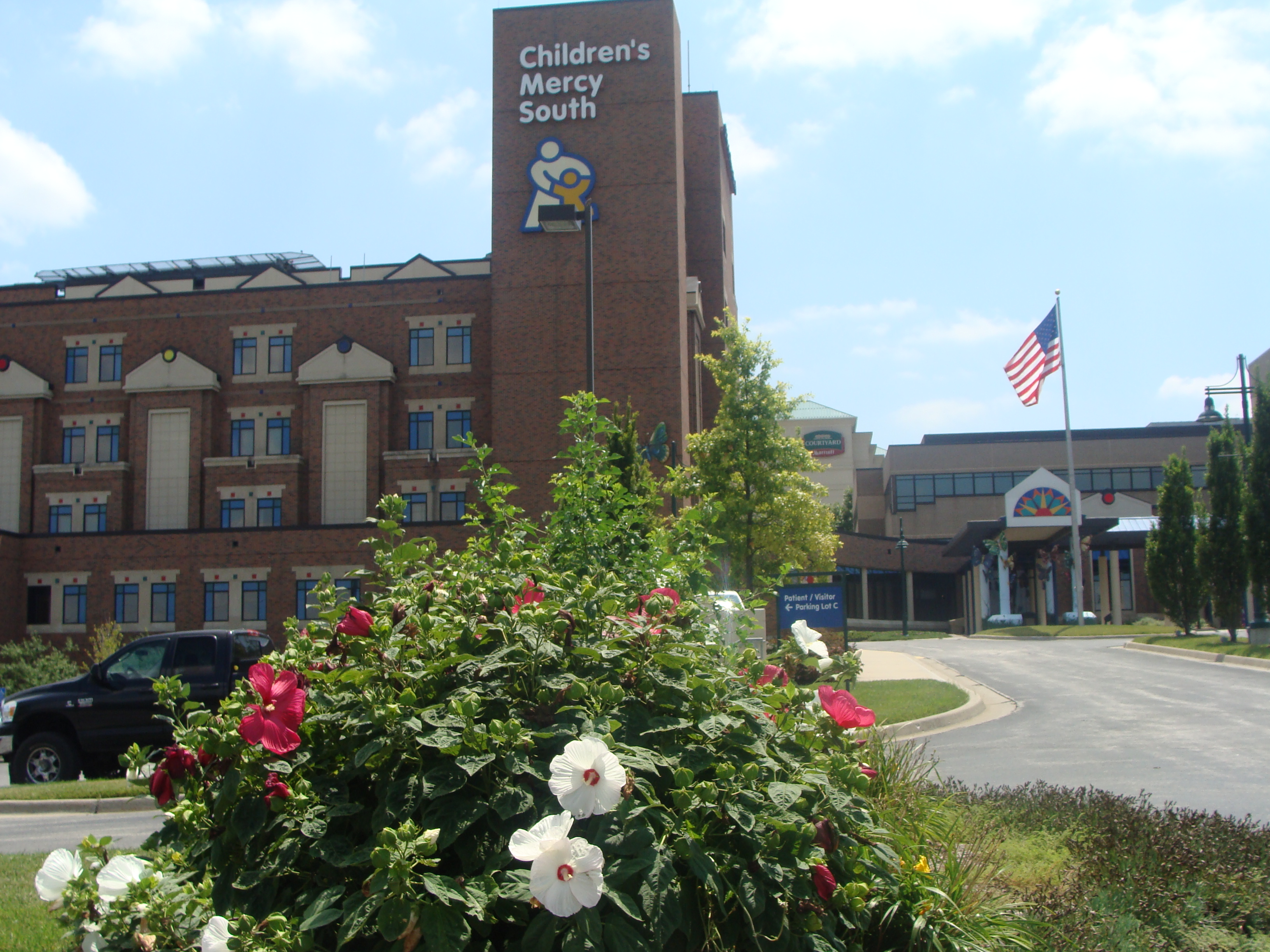
Children's Mercy Hospital Kansas is the largest pediatric hospital in the state of Kansas

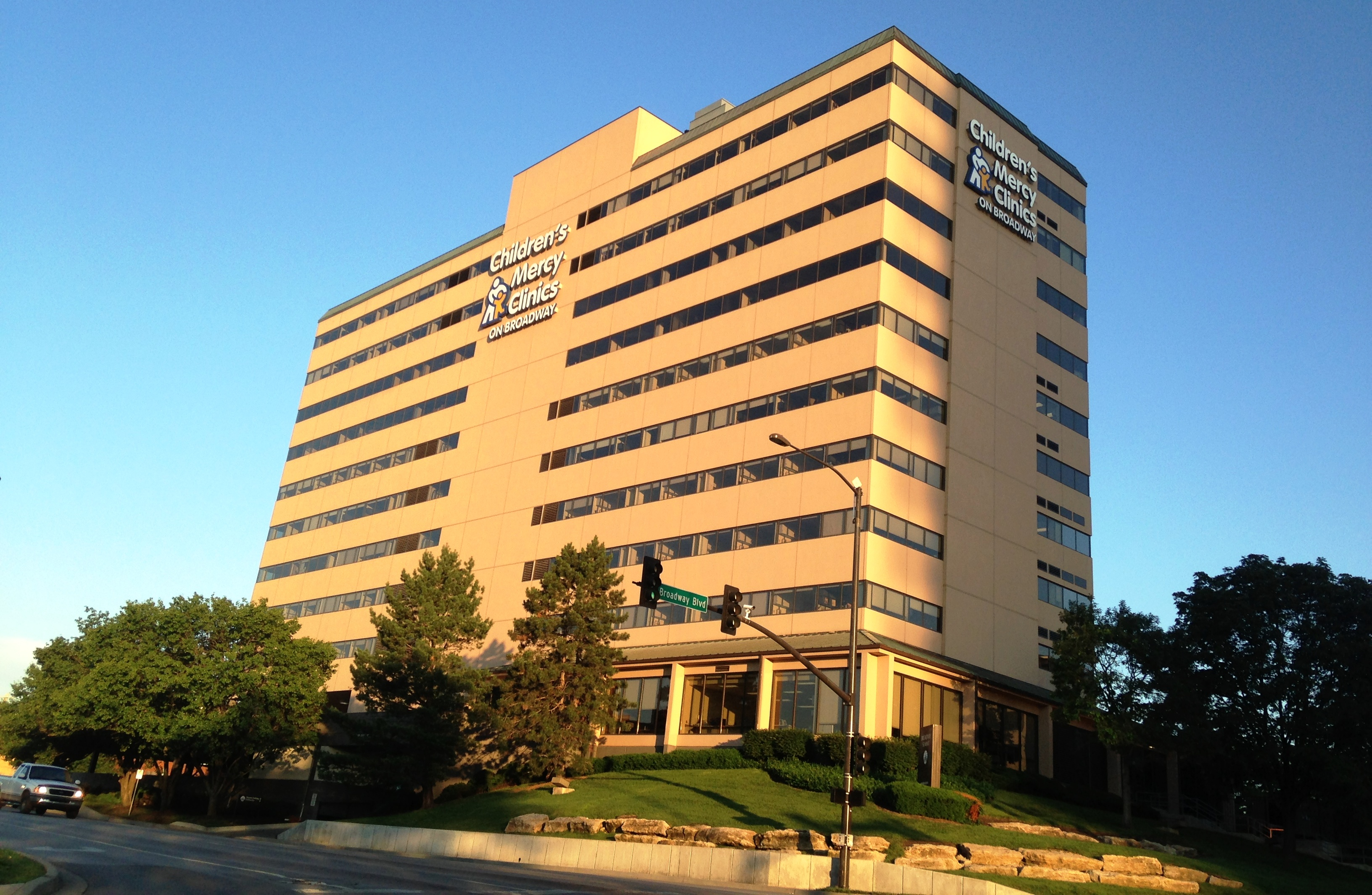
Broadway Clinics is located near midtown Kansas City, just south of Liberty Memorial

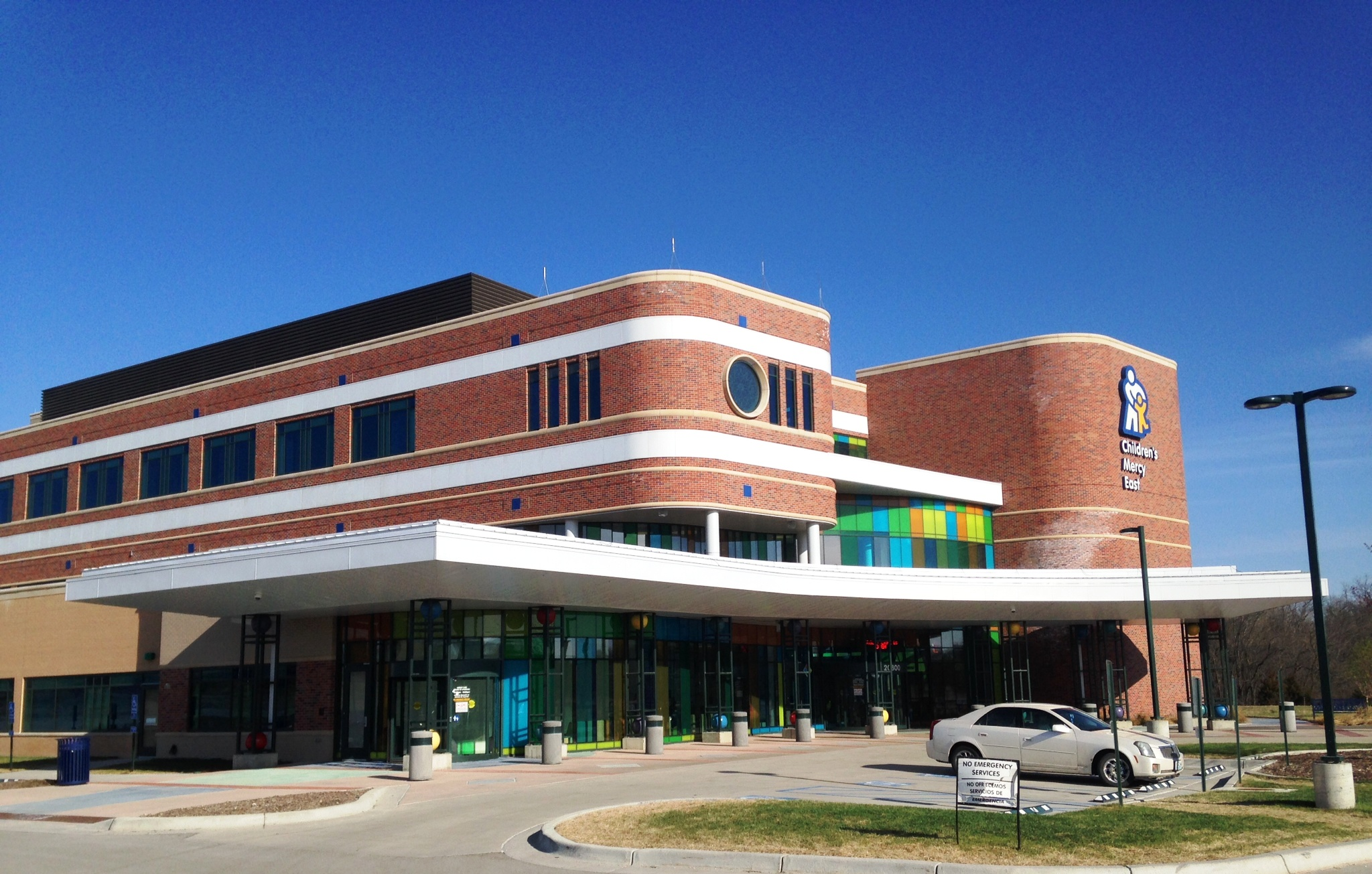
Children's Mercy East is located 16 miles east of Kansas City in Independence, Missouri

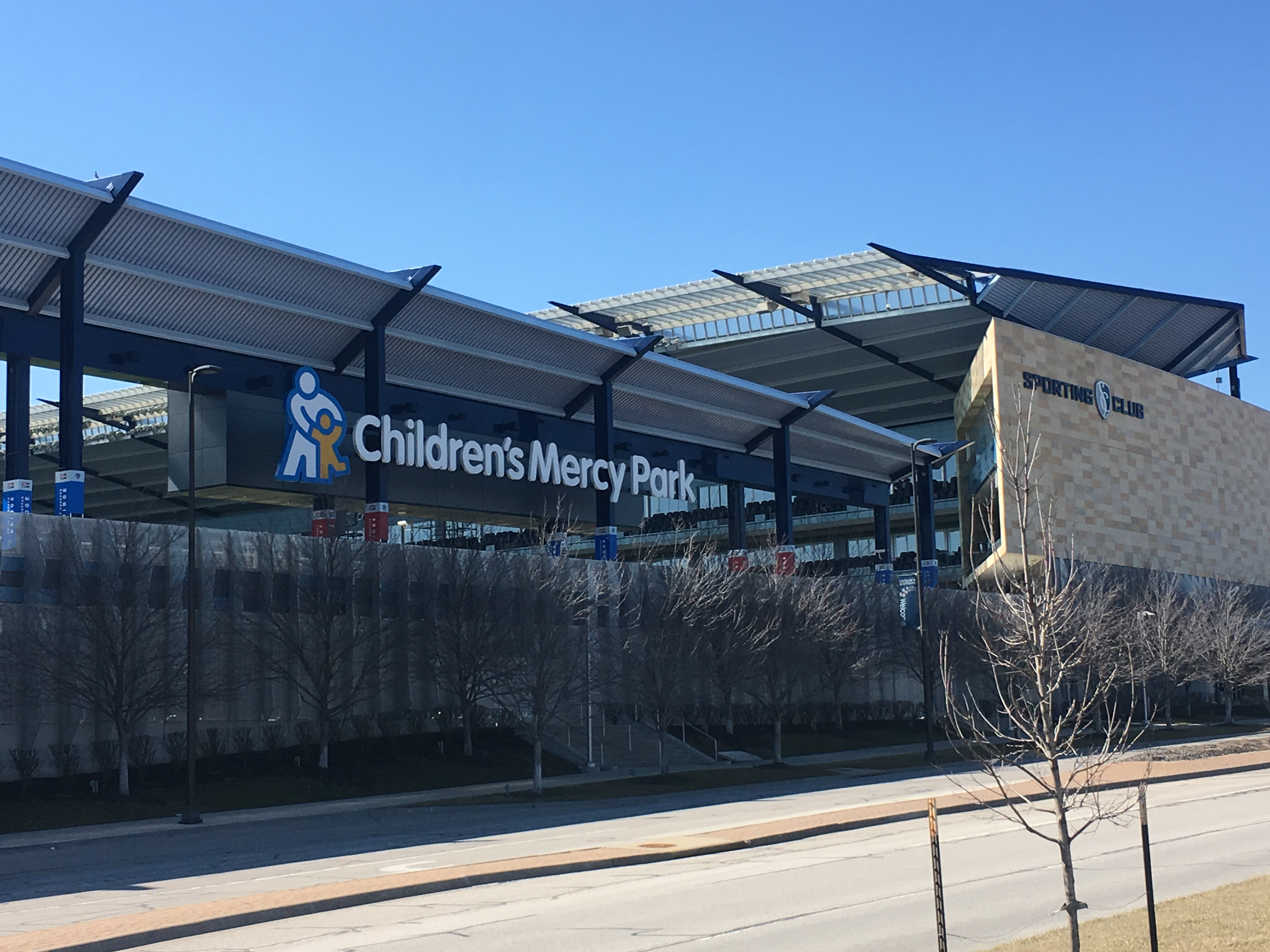
Children's Mercy Village West is located near Sporting Park

== Research ==
The research program at the Children's Mercy Research Institute features 375,000 square-feet of dedicated clinical research space and over 100 physicians and scientists actively participating in research studies.

It is one of the 10 stakeholder institutions in the Kansas City Area Life Sciences Institute, which also includes the University of Kansas, MRI Global, the University of Missouri-Kansas City and the Stowers Institute.

The Children’s Mercy Research Institute Centers provide the support and infrastructure guiding research efforts:

- Center for Emerging Infections
- Center for Genomic Medicine
- Center for Population Health & Outcomes Research
- Center for Precision Therapeutics

The hospital is one of 13 designated Pediatric Pharmacology Research Units. Hospital clinical pharmacologists work closely with the Pediatric Trials Network, researching and developing accurate drug doses and devices for children.

In 2012, the hospital's Center for Pediatric Genomic Medicine developed the rapid whole genome sequencing approach.

Genomic Answers for Kids (GA4K), which began in 2019, is the pediatric data repository to facilitate the search for answers and novel treatments for these conditions. By 2026, GA4K reported having identified 2,400 rare diagnoses and has enrolled more than 18,500 participants into GA4K.

In February 2026, The University of Kansas Health System, the University of Kansas Medical Center, Children’s Mercy and Bold Advanced Medical Future (BAMF) Health announced their intentions to establish one of the nation’s first fully integrated theranostics platforms for both adult and pediatric patients bringing advanced research, diagnostics and targeted treatments together in one place.

In April 2026, Children’s Mercy announced a major expansion of its cell and gene therapy program to further its commitment to deliver the most advanced, life-changing treatments for children with complex and rare conditions. Children’s Mercy said it would collaborate with Basepath Health to establish a next-generation, scalable model for delivering cell and gene therapy treatments for children and young adults with rare genetic disorders, aggressive cancers and a growing range of diseases.

== Clinical care ==
Children's Mercy services include a Level 1 Children's Surgery Center; a Level 1 Trauma Center; a Level IV Neonatal Intensive Care unit, providing the highest level of care possible to the tiniest patients; heart, liver, kidney, blood and marrow transplant programs; and more than 40 pediatric subspecialty clinics.

== Academics ==
Children's Mercy is an Accreditation Council of Graduate Medical Education Institutional Sponsor and focuses on the development of programs based on the ACGME core competencies and the acquisition of clinical skills.

Children's Mercy is academically affiliated with both the University of Missouri-Kansas City School of Medicine and the University of Kansas and offers a pediatric residency program that annually accepts 27 categorical pediatric residents, one preliminary resident, four combined pediatrics/neurology residents and six internal medicine/pediatrics residents. Children's Mercy also offers 56 subspecialty fellowship programs to train the next generation of pediatric subspecialists.

In addition, Children's Mercy hosts over 600 residents from partnering institutions in Kansas, Missouri, Oklahoma and Nebraska. More than 1500 health care students rotate through Children's Mercy annually.

== Rankings and performance ==
National Program Rankings
Category	Ranking
Cardiology & Heart Surgery	30 (tie)
Diabetes & Endocrinology	36
Gastroenterology & GI Surgery	33
Neonatology	40
Nephrology	14 (tie)
Neurology & Neurosurgery	23
Pulmonology & Lung Surgery	46
Urology	26
Behavioral Health	Top 50

Children’s Mercy is recognized as one of the nation’s top pediatric hospitals, according to U.S. News & World Report's 2026-2027 “Best Children’s Hospitals” report. This year, Children’s Mercy ranked in 10 of the 11 pediatric specialties:

- Cancer
- Cardiology & Heart Surgery
- Diabetes & Endocrinology
- Gastroenterology / GI Surgery
- Nephrology / Kidney
- Neurology & Neurosurgery
- Orthopedics
- Pulmonology / Respiratory Disorders
- Urology
- Behavioral Health

The highest rankings were diabetes & endocrinology at #14, nephrology tied at #14 and urology at #17.

The hospital has been designated a "Magnet Recognized" center by the American Nurses Credentialing Center.

Children's Mercy earned the 2022-2023 Platinum Level Healthy KC Certified from the Greater Kansas City Chamber of Commerce.

Children's Mercy earned Newsweek’s “America’s Best Workplaces for Diversity” and “America’s Best Workplaces for Women” designations in 2025.

== Signature fundraising events ==
Children's Mercy is supported by several large-scale fundraising events that generate philanthropic support for patient care, research and family services. Among the organization's most prominent signature events are Red Hot Night, Big Slick and Dream Big Day.

Red Hot Night is Children's Mercy's annual gala and one of the hospital's longest-running fundraising events. The event brings together community leaders, donors and supporters for an evening that typically includes dining, entertainment, auctions and fundraising activities. Since its founding in 1986, the Red Hot Night Board and its fundraising efforts have generated millions of dollars in support of Children's Mercy. Proceeds support priorities across the organization, including patient care, research and family-centered programs.

Big Slick Celebrity Weekend is an annual fundraising event benefiting Children's Mercy's cancer research and care programs. Founded by Kansas City-area entertainers Rob Riggle, Paul Rudd and Jason Sudeikis, and later joined by David Koechner, Eric Stonestreet and Heidi Gardner, the event features celebrity appearances, live entertainment, community events and hospital visits by celebrity hosts and their friends. All proceeds from Big Slick support pediatric cancer research and treatment initiatives at Children's Mercy.

Dream Big Day is a family-focused community fundraising event that celebrates patients, families and supporters of Children's Mercy. The event includes fundraising activities, family entertainment and opportunities for participants to share their connections to the hospital. Funds raised through Dream Big Day support Children's Mercy's mission to provide pediatric care, advance research and improve children's health outcomes throughout the region.
