= List of religious buildings in Metro Manila =

This is a list of religious buildings in Metro Manila, Philippines, organized by religion and then by city and municipality.

== Buddhism ==
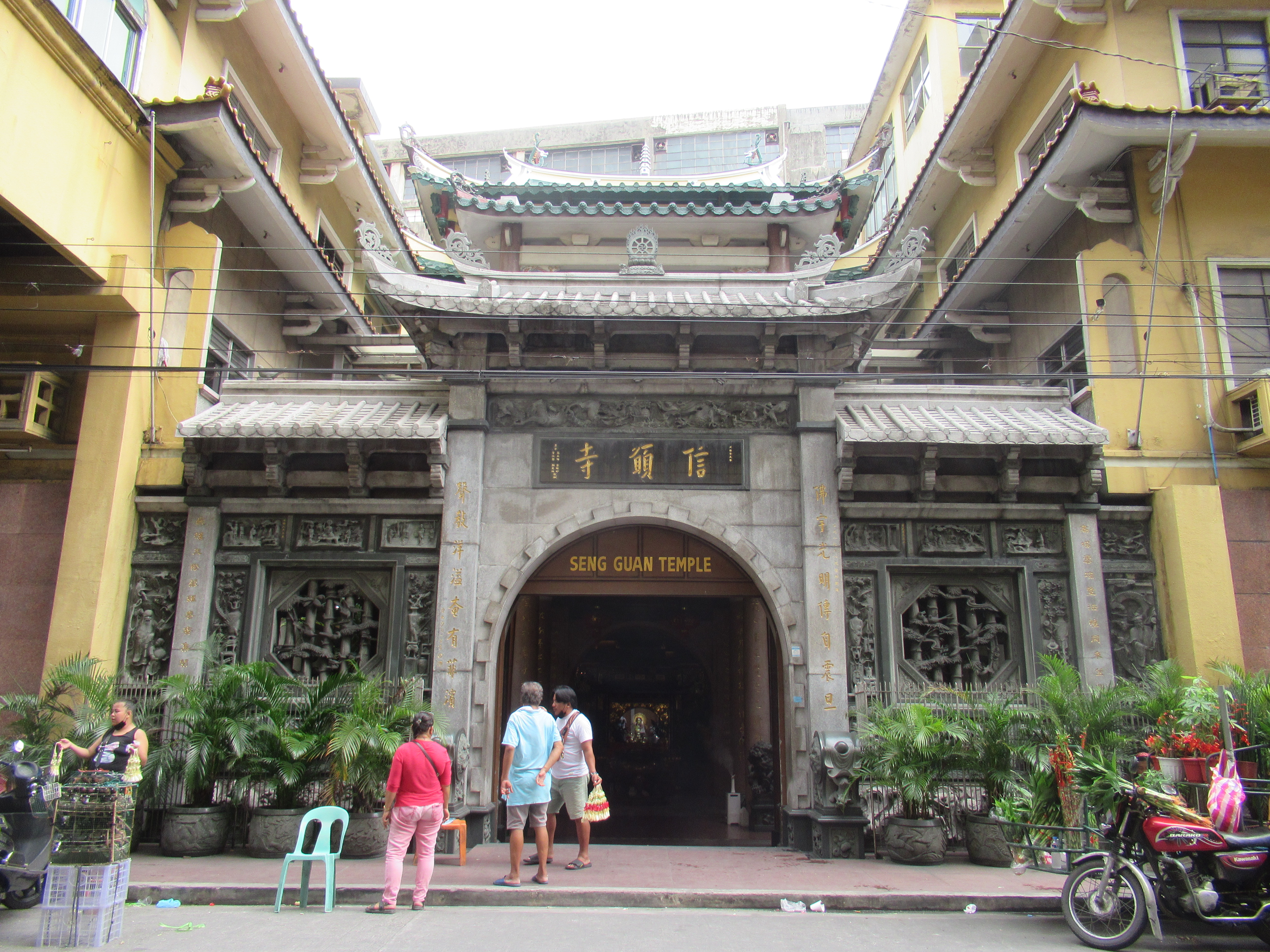
Seng Guan Temple

- City of Manila
  - Ching Gui Bio Temple (Binondo)
  - Fo Guang Shan Mabuhay Temple (Malate)
  - Nyingma Palyul Chang Chub Dargye Dharma Center (Santa Mesa)
  - Karma Kagyu Buddhist Society (Santa Mesa)
  - Nedo Bodhi Karma Kagyu Dharma Foundation (Santa Mesa)
  - Po An Temple (Malate)
  - Po Chuan Am Temple (Binondo)
  - Seng Guan Temple (Narra Tondo)
  - Soc Yan Buddhist Temple (Tondo)
  - Teng Hai Temple (Binondo)
  - Tun Chi Temple (Binondo)
  - Yuan Tung Temple (Santa Cruz)
- Caloocan
  - Ung Siu Si Buddhist Temple
- Malabon
  - Hwa Chong Temple
  - Seng Kong Temple
- Parañaque
  - Kiu Pat Long Shiao Temple
- Quezon City
  - Gautama Temple
  - Soka Gakkai International of the Philippines
- San Juan
  - Ming Kuang Temple
  - Ocean Sky Chan Monastery

== Christianity ==
=== Anglican Church ===
- Holy Trinity Church Manila (Makati)

=== Baptist Church ===
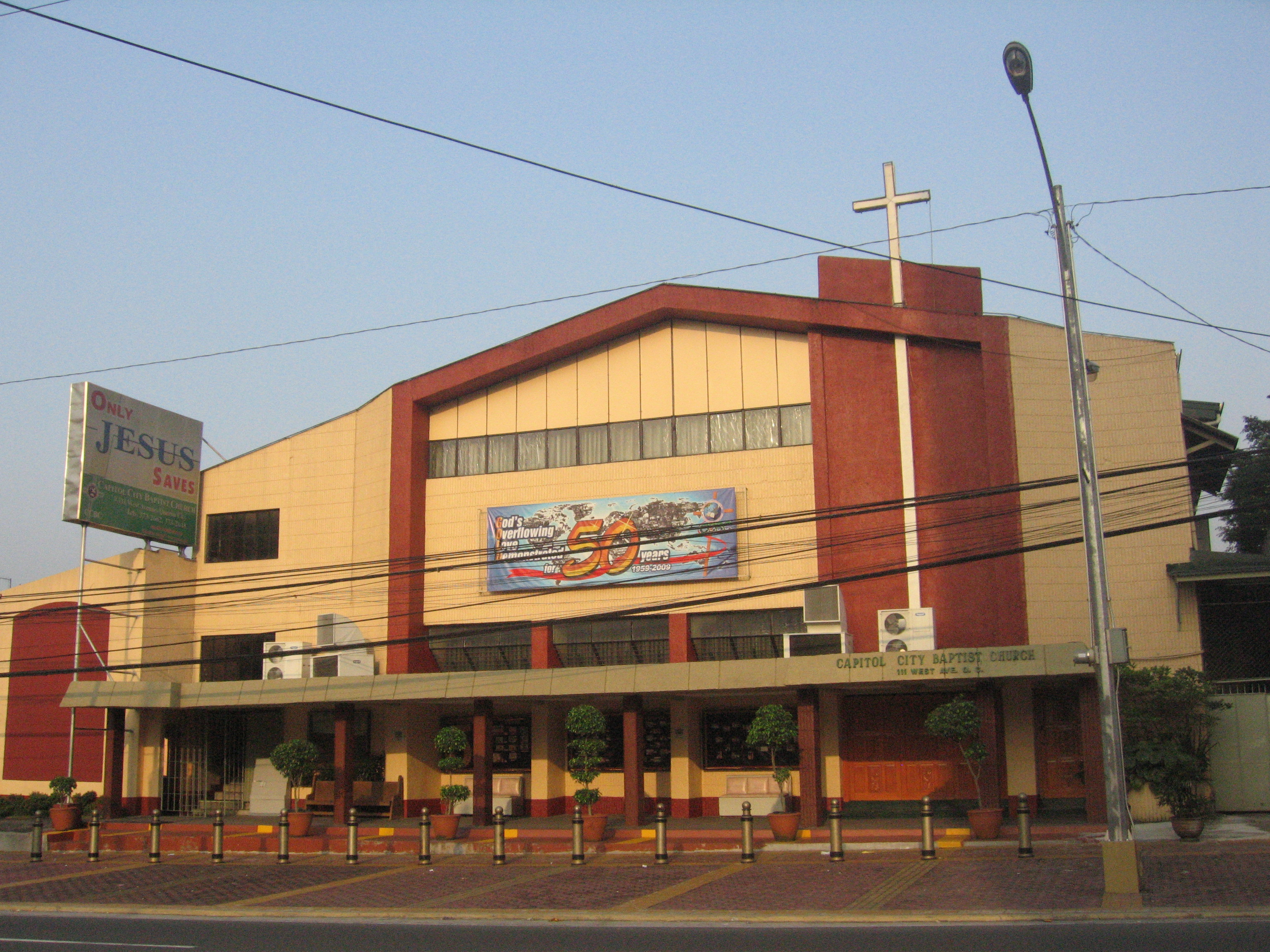
Capitol City Baptist Church

- Bethany Baptist Church (Barangay Palanan, Makati)
- Capitol City Baptist Church (Quezon City)
- First Baptist Church of Manila (Quezon City)
- First Baptist Church of Pildera (Pasay)
- International Baptist Church of Manila (Makati)
- Metropolitan Bible Baptist Church (Santa Ana)
- Onyx Fundamental Baptist Church (Paco)
- Sikatuna First Baptist Church (Quezon City)
- University Baptist Church (Sampaloc)
- Global City Bible Baptist Church (Taguig)

=== The Church of Jesus Christ of Latter-day Saints ===
- Manila Philippines Temple (Quezon City)

=== Episcopal Church ===
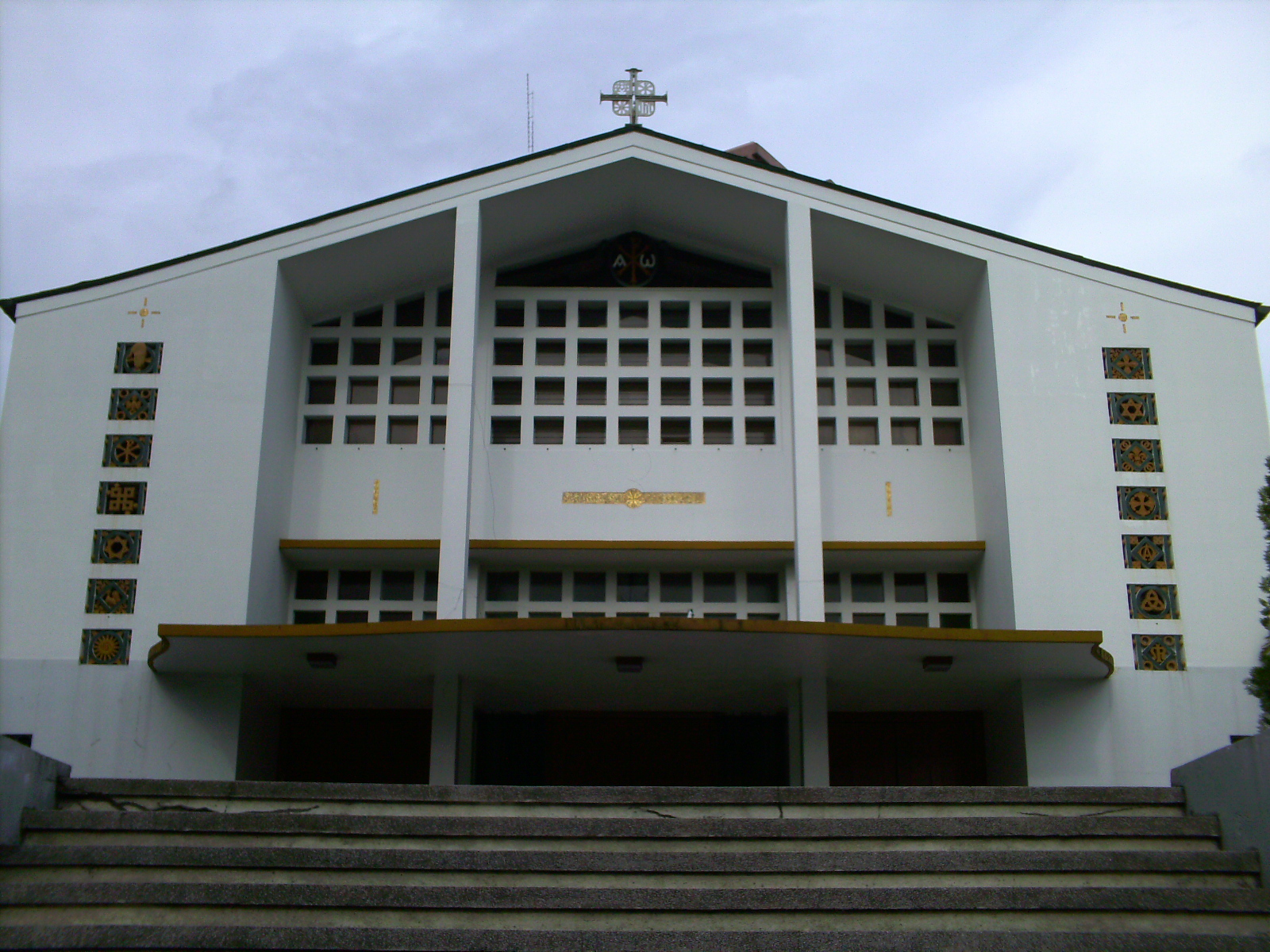
Episcopalian Cathedral of Saint Mary & Saint John

- Cathedral of St. Mary and St. John (Quezon City)
- St. Andrew's Theological Seminary Chapel (Quezon City)
- Saint Peter's Episcopal Church (Binondo)
- Saint Stephen's Pro-Cathedral (Santa Cruz)

=== Iglesia Filipina Independiente ===
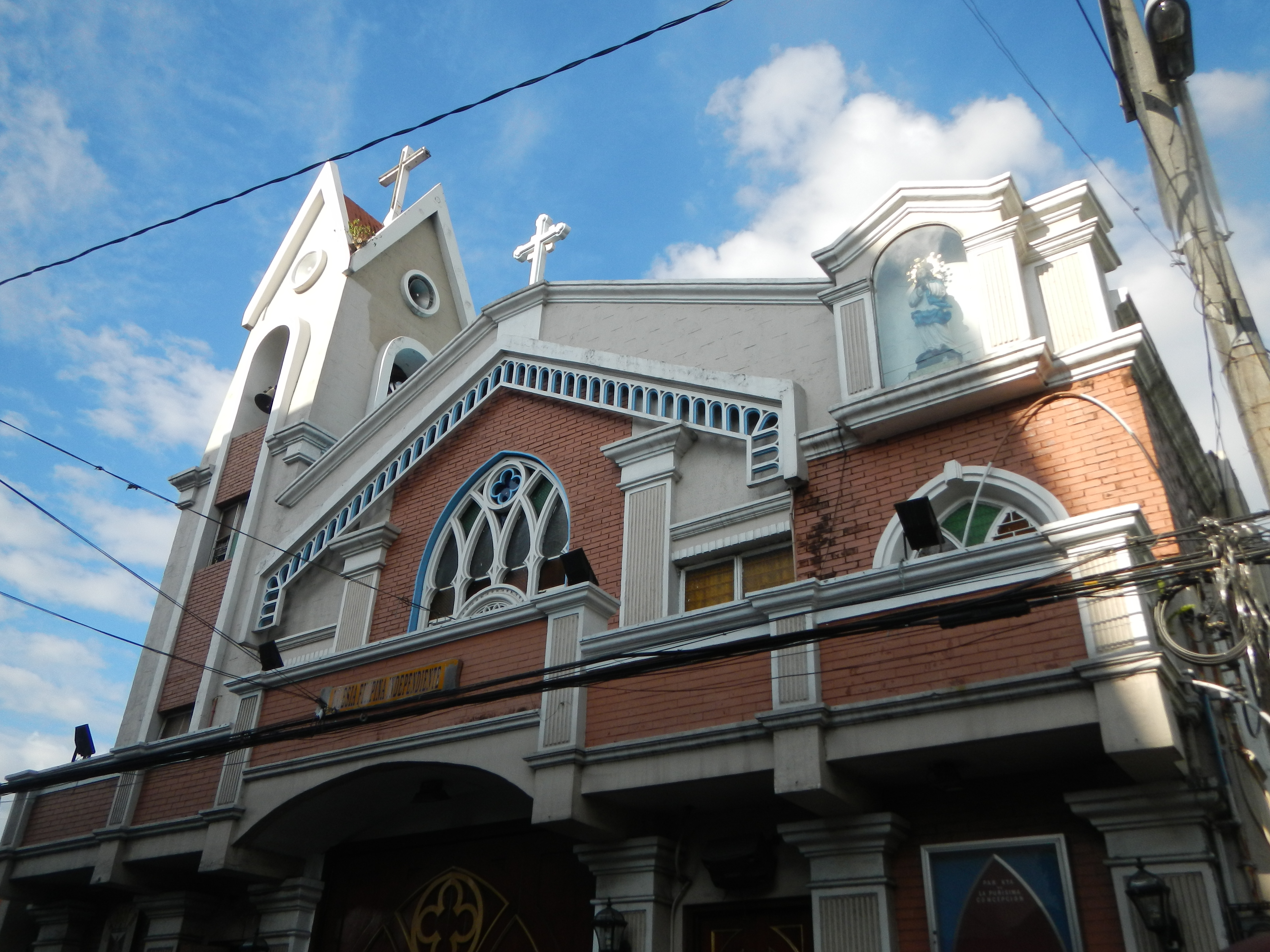
Iglesia Filipina Independiente, La Purisima Concepcion de Malabon Church

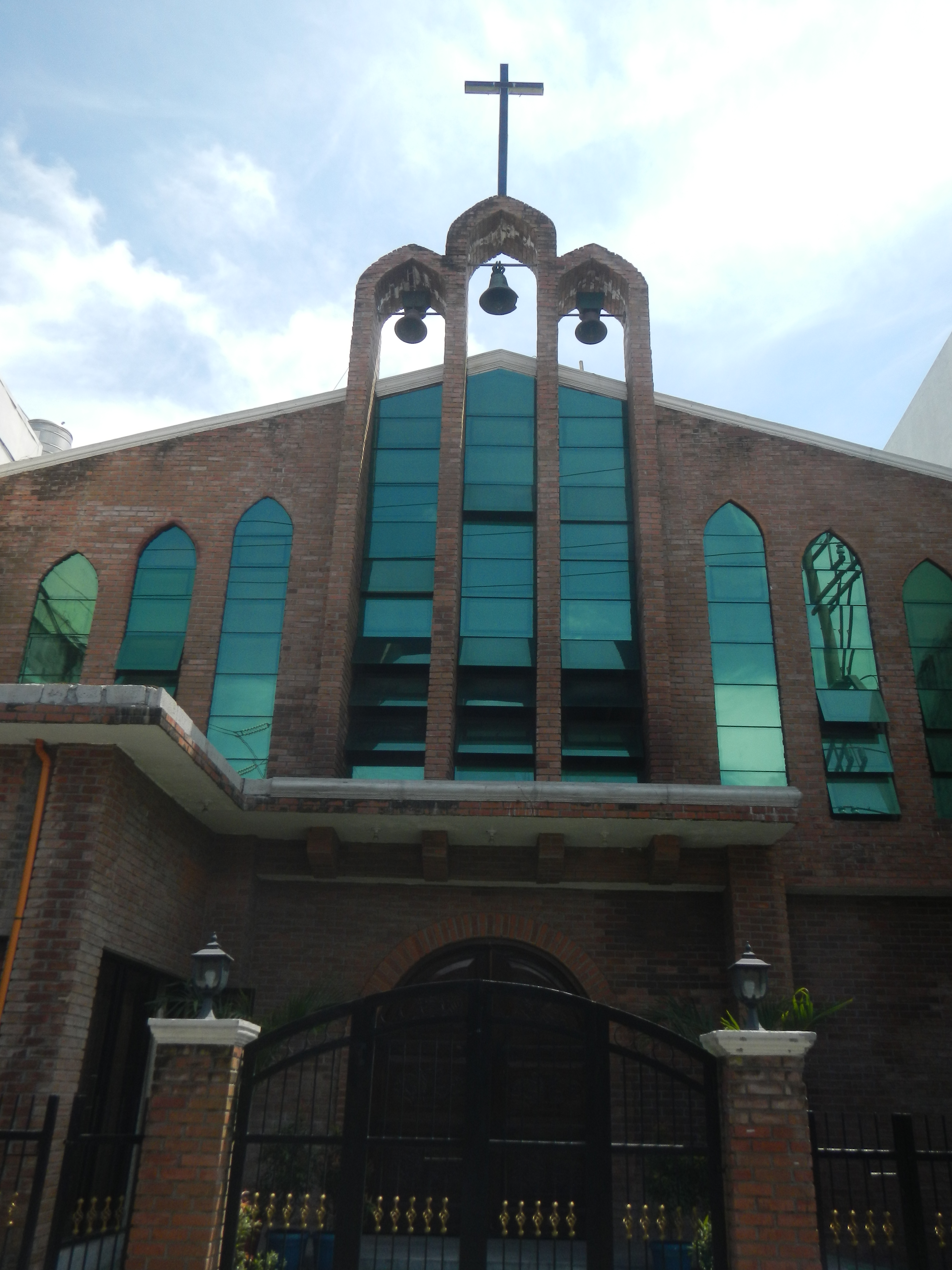
Iglesia Filipina Independiente, Parish of St. John the Baptist, Taguig City

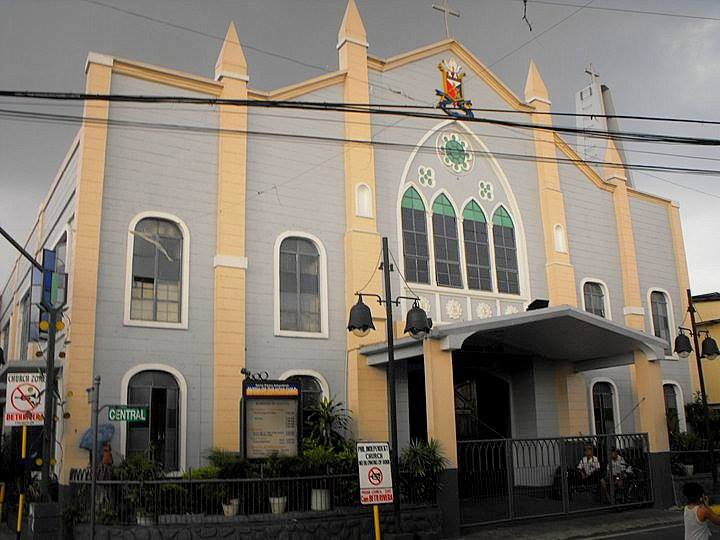
Iglesia Filipina Independiente, Cathedral Parish of the Holy Child, Pandacan, Manila

- Iglesia Filipina Independiente National Cathedral (Ermita)
- Cathedral of the Holy Child Sto. Niño (Mandaluyong)
- La Purisima Concepcion de Malabon (Malabon)
- Maria Clara Parish Church (Santa Cruz)
- Cathedral of the Holy Child (Pandacan)
- Parish of the Holy Sepulchre (Paco)
- Mission Church of Sto. Niño (Punta, Santa Ana)
- Parish of the Holy Child (Tondo)
- Parish of the Good Shepherd (Sampaloc)
- Parish of the Holy Trinity (Pasay)
- Parish of La Purisima Concepcion (Marikina)
- Parish of Malanday (Marikina)
- Parish of St. John the Baptist (Taguig)

=== Iglesia ni Cristo ===
Iglesia ni Cristo Central Temple

- INC Central Temple (Quezon City)
- Locale of F. Manalo (San Juan City)
- Locale of Tondo (Tondo)
- Locale of Capitol (Quezon City)

=== Methodist Church ===
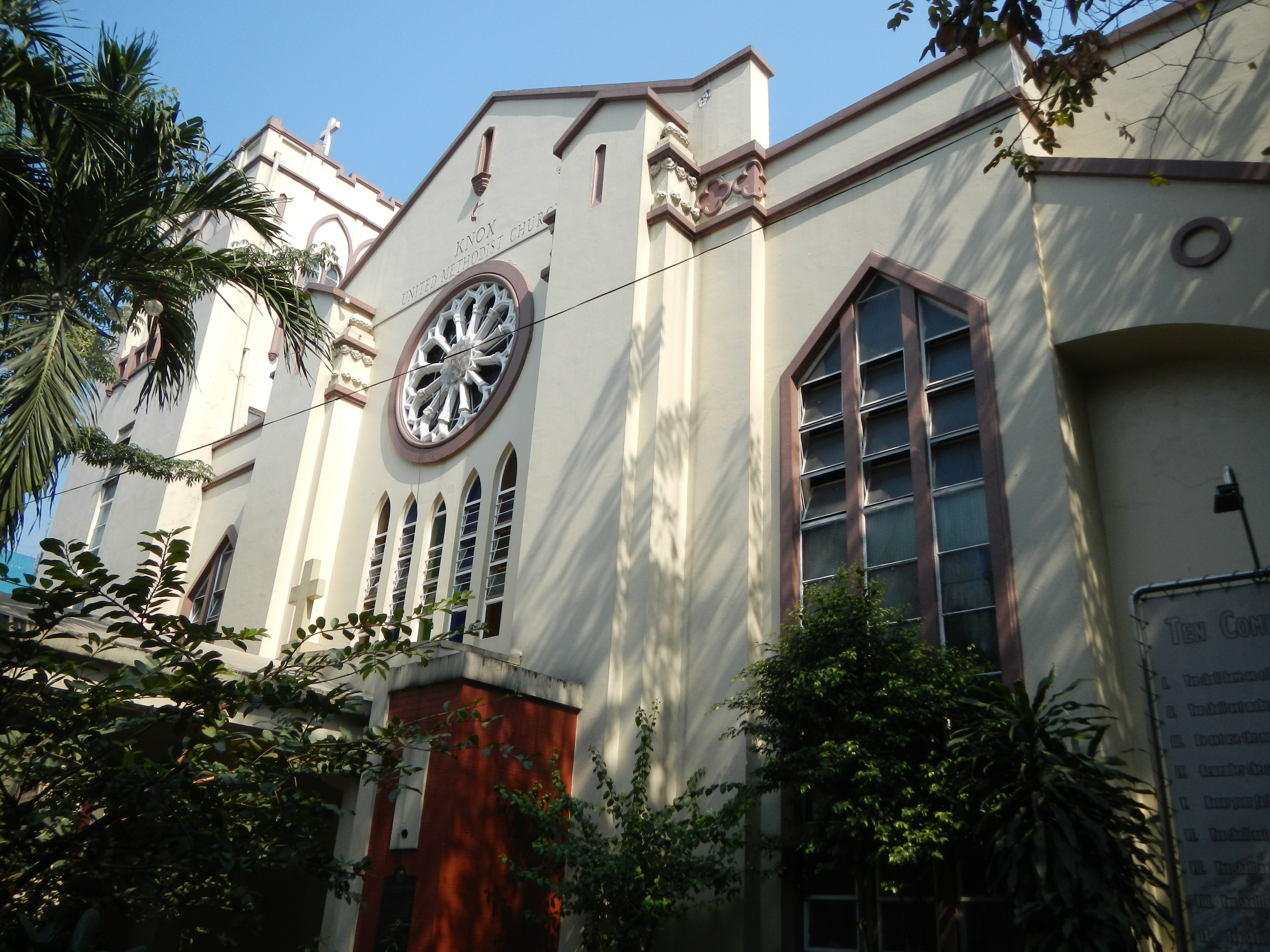
Knox United Methodist Church

- Central United Methodist Church (Ermita)
- Cosmopolitan Church (Ermita)
- Iglesia Evangelica Metodista en las Islas Filipinas (Tondo)
- Knox United Methodist Church (Santa Cruz)
- Valenzuela United Methodist Church (Valenzuela)
- Pandacan United Methodist Church (Pandacan)
- Malabon Central United Methodist Church (Malabon)
- Polo Methodist Church of Valenzuela (Valenzuela)
- Puno United Methodist Church (Quezon City)
- St Mark United Methodist Church (Manila)

=== Pentecostal Church ===
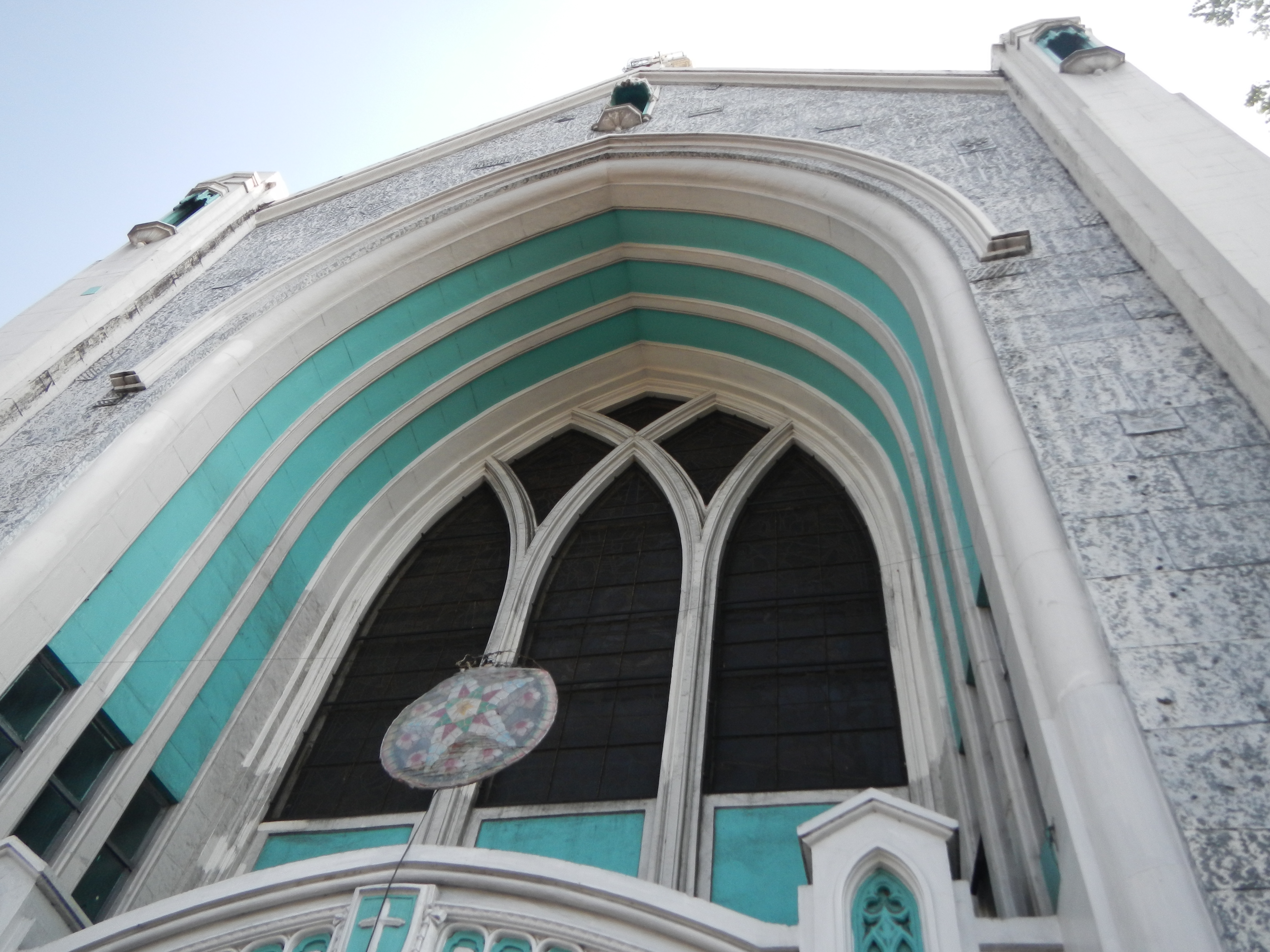
Central United Methodist Church in Ermita

- Cathedral of Praise (Ermita)
- United Pentecostal Church (Tondo)
- Jesus Christ Saves Global Outreach (Mega Church) (Quezon City)
- Church of God Caloocan (Caloocan)

=== Seventh-day Adventist Church ===
- Seventh Day Adventist Church (Manila)
- Seventh Day Adventist Church (Malabon)
- Seventh Day Adventist Church (Taguig)

=== Others ===
- Bulwagan ng Panginoon (Pasay)
- Christ's Commission Fellowship (Pasig)
- Church of the Risen Lord (Quezon City)
- The Rock Church (Makati)
- Union Church of Manila (Makati)
- Victory Christian Fellowship (Every Nation Philippines) (Taguig)

== Hinduism ==
- City of Manila
  - Hari Ram Temple (Paco)
  - Saya Aur Devi Mandir Temple (Paco)
- Quezon City
  - Ramakrishna Vedanta Society

== Islam ==
Golden Mosque

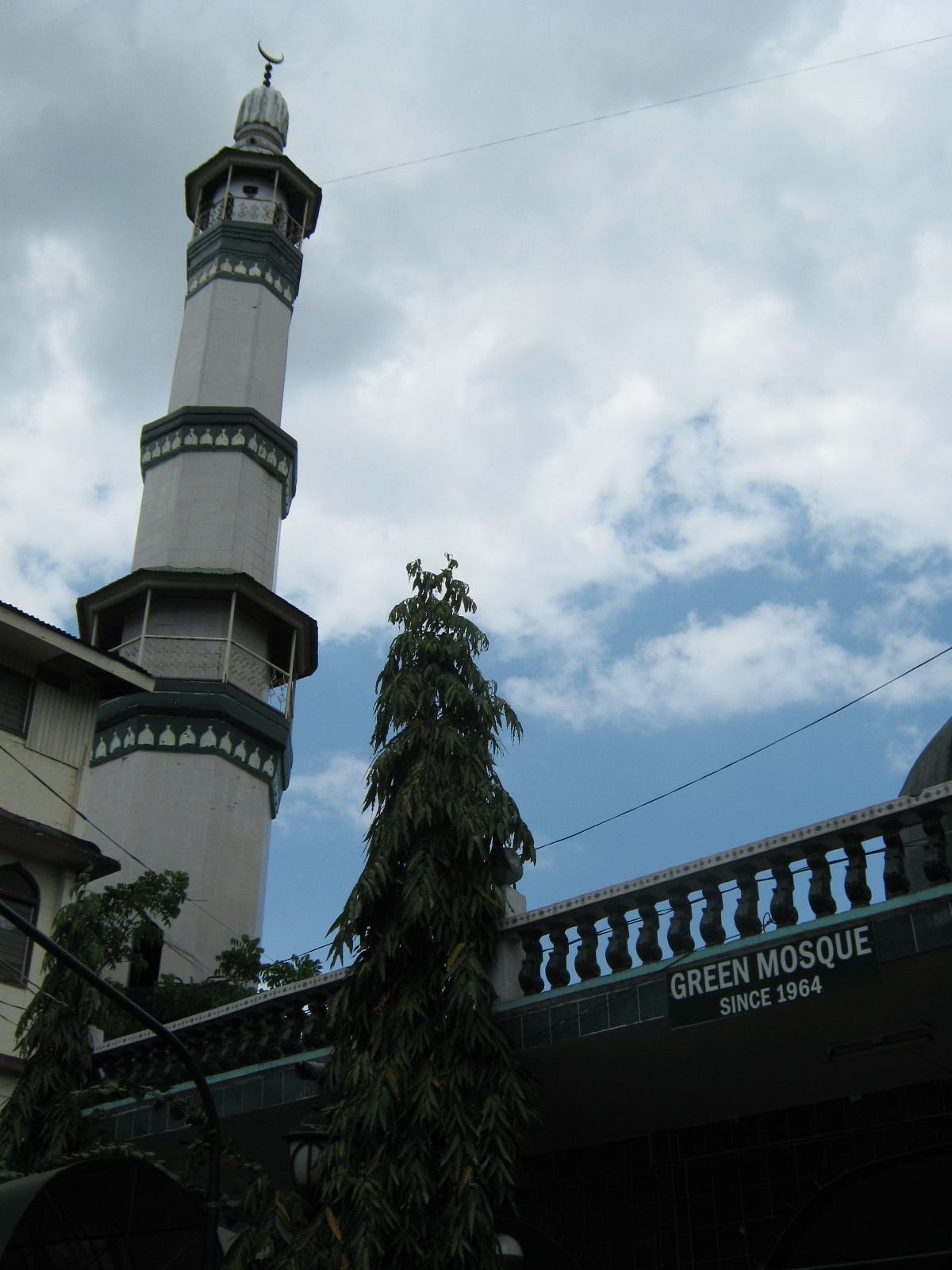
Green Mosque

- City of Manila
  - Golden Mosque
- Caloocan
  - Alhuda Mosque
  - Al-Noor Mosque
  - Caloocan Grand Mosque
  - Masjid Ibnu Abbas
- Parañaque
  - Baclaran Mosque
  - Peace Masjid Al-Gerande
- Pasig
  - Ferdaus Mosque
- Quezon City
  - Abdul-Aziz Mosque
  - Ever Commonwealth Mosque
  - Masjid Al-Ikhlas
  - Mubarak Mosque
  - Rahma Qur'anic Learning Center & Mosque
  - Ulomodin Dumagay Mubarak Mosque
- San Juan
  - Greenhills Mosque
- Taguig
  - Blue Mosque
  - Green Mosque
  - Masjid An Noor

== Judaism ==
- Makati
  - Beit Yaacov Synagogue

== Sikhism ==
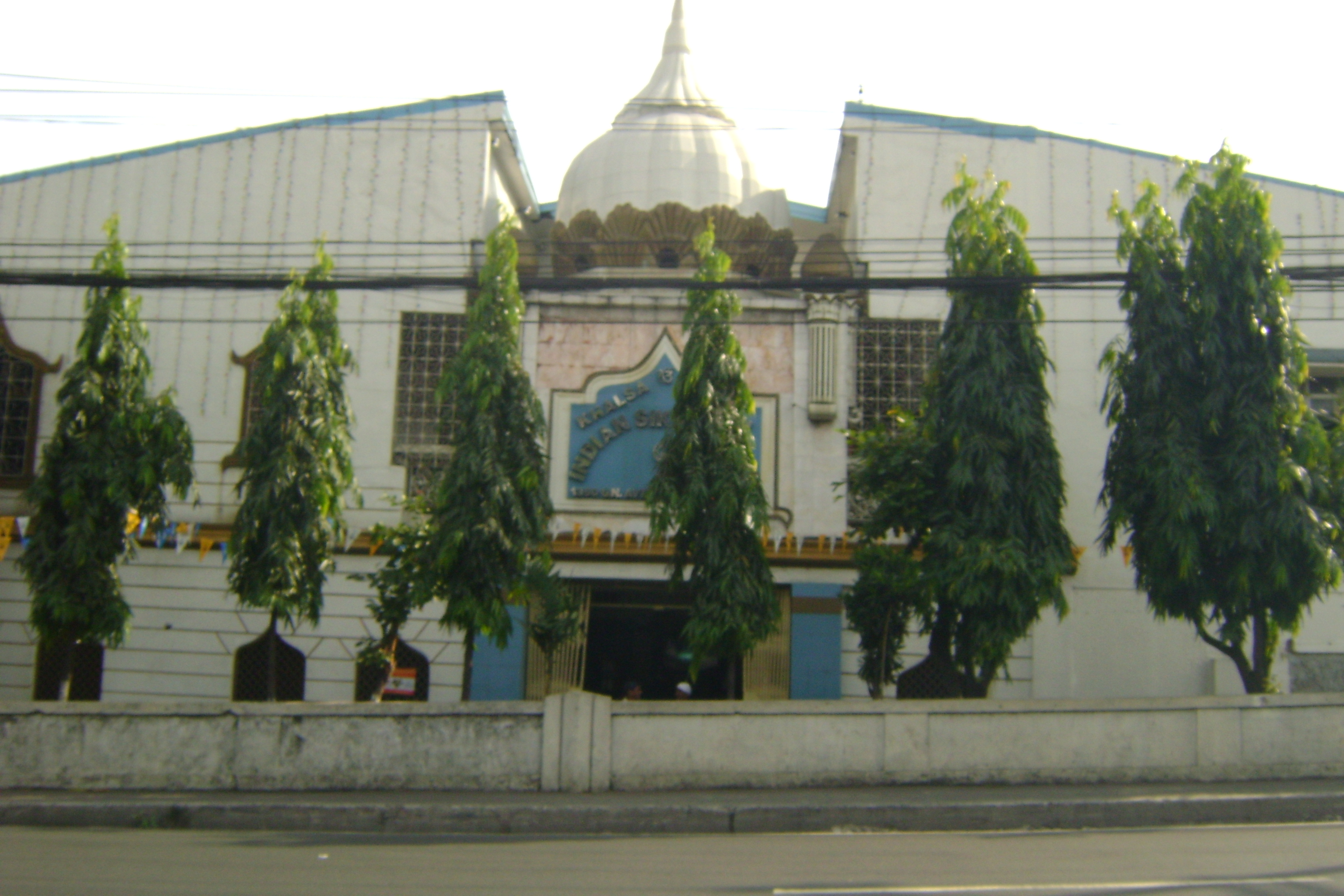
Khalsa Diwan Temple

- City of Manila
  - Khalsa Diwan Temple (Paco)

== Taoism ==
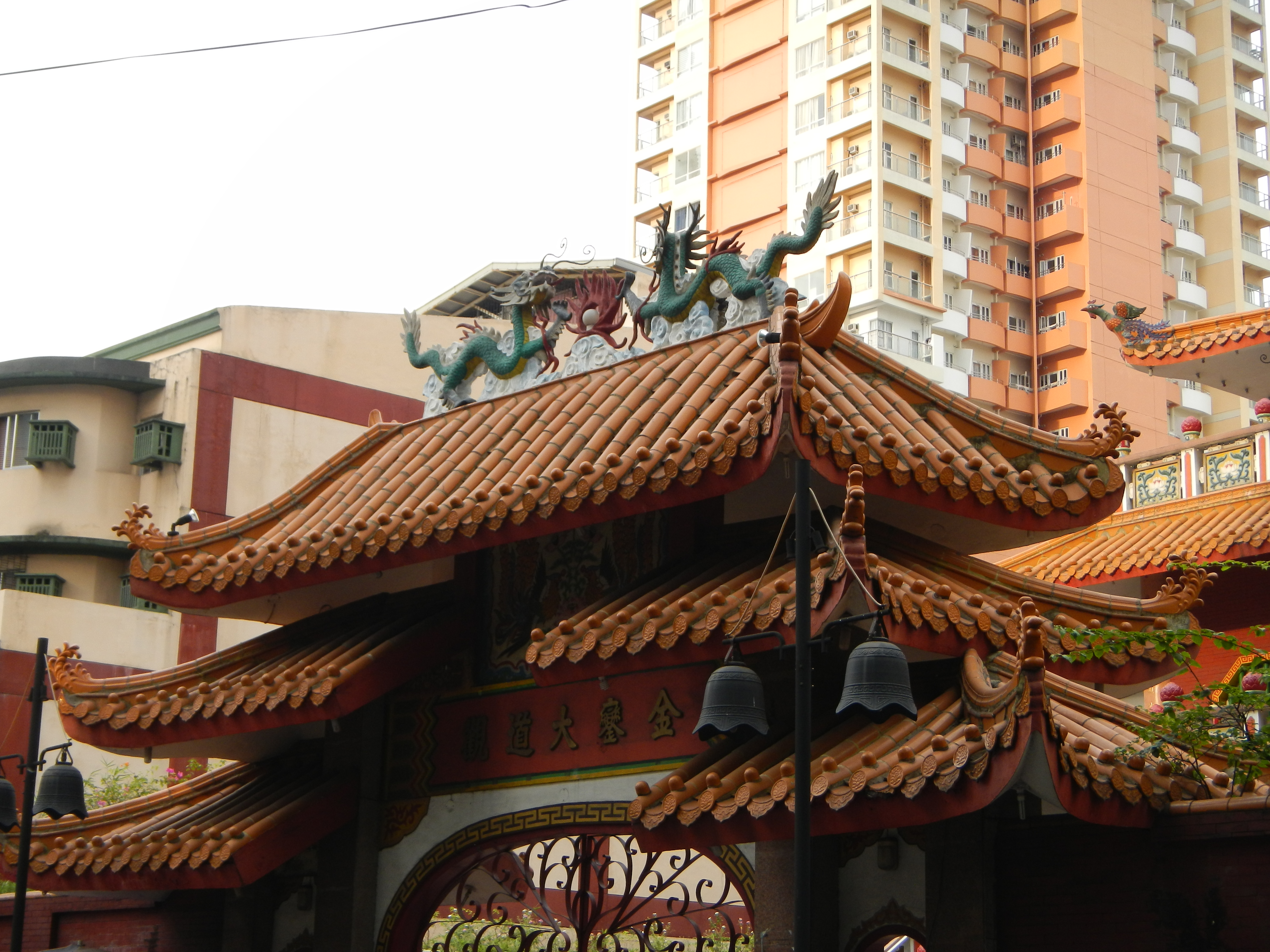
Kim Luan Temple

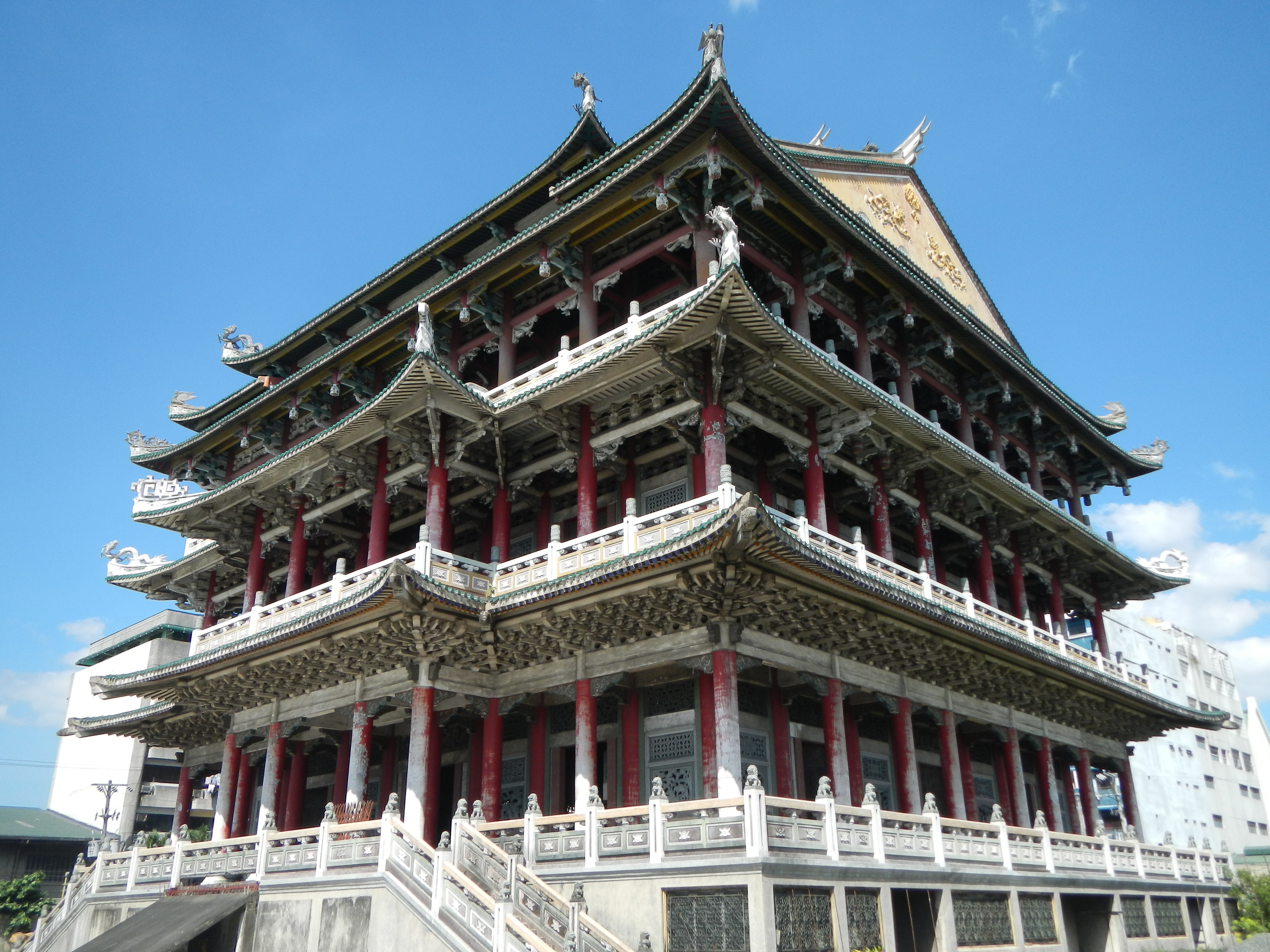
Thai To Taoist Temple

- City of Manila
  - Kim Luan Temple
- Caloocan
  - Thai To Taoist Temple
- Parañaque
  - Kiu Pat Hong Shiao Temple
- Pasay
  - Pao Ong Kong Temple - F.B. Harrison St.
- Quezon City
  - Seng Lian Temple
  - Sun Tay Seng Temple - Times Street
- Valenzuela
  - Pak Sieng Pao Ong Temple
