= Baptist Hospital =

Baptist Hospital may refer to:

in Hong Kong

- Hong Kong Baptist Hospital, in Hong Kong

in India

- Bangalore Baptist Hospital, in Bangalore, India.

in the Philippines

- Bethel Baptist Hospital, in the Philippines

in the United States

- Baptist Hospital of Miami, in Miami, Florida
- Baptist Hospital (Pensacola), Florida
- Atlanta Medical Center (formerly Georgia Baptist Hospital)
- Clovis Baptist Hospital, in Clovis, New Mexico
- Prisma Health Baptist Hospital, in South Carolina
- Baptist Hospital (Nashville), Tennessee
- Atrium Health Wake Forest Baptist, previously called North Carolina Baptist Hospital

== See also ==
- Baptist Medical Center (disambiguation)
- Baptist Memorial Hospital (disambiguation)
- Baptist Health (disambiguation)
