= Baptist Medical Center (disambiguation) =

Baptist Medical Center may refer to:

- Baptist Medical Center, a hospital located in San Antonio, Texas
- Baptist Medical Center Beaches, a hospital located in Jacksonville, Florida
- Baptist Medical Center Jacksonville, a hospital located in Jacksonville, Florida
- Baptist Medical Center Nassau, a hospital located in Fernandina, Florida
- Baptist Medical Center South, a hospital located in Jacksonville, Florida
- Missouri Baptist Medical Center, a hospital in St. Louis, Missouri
- Ochsner Baptist Medical Center, a hospital in New Orleans, Louisiana
- Research Medical Center-Brookside Campus, a hospital in Kansas City, Missouri that was formally known as Baptist Medical Center
- Wake Forest Baptist Medical Center, an academic medical center located in Winston-Salem, North Carolina

== Other uses ==
- Atlanta Medical Center, formerly known as Georgia Baptist Medical Center
- Baptist Medical Center sex reassignment surgery controversy, a sex reassignment surgery controversy which occurred in 1977 in Oklahoma City, Oklahoma

== See also ==
- Baptist Hospital (disambiguation)
- Baptist Memorial Hospital (disambiguation)
- Baptist Health (disambiguation)
