= Baptist Health =

Baptist Health may refer to:

== In the United States ==
- Baptist Health (Kentucky and Southern Indiana), a health system of 8 hospitals headquartered in Louisville, Kentucky, with facilities throughout Kentucky and Southern Indiana
- Baptist Health (Jacksonville), a network of 7 hospitals, affiliated with over 50 primary care offices located throughout Northeast Florida and Southeast Georgia
- Baptist Health South Florida, a faith-based not-for-profit healthcare organization and clinical care network in southern Florida
- Baptist Health System, a health system in San Antonio, Texas
- Brookwood Baptist Health, a health system in Birmingham, Alabama

== See also ==
- Baptist Medical Center (disambiguation)
- Baptist Memorial Hospital (disambiguation)
