= Saint Peter's Episcopal Church (Manila) =

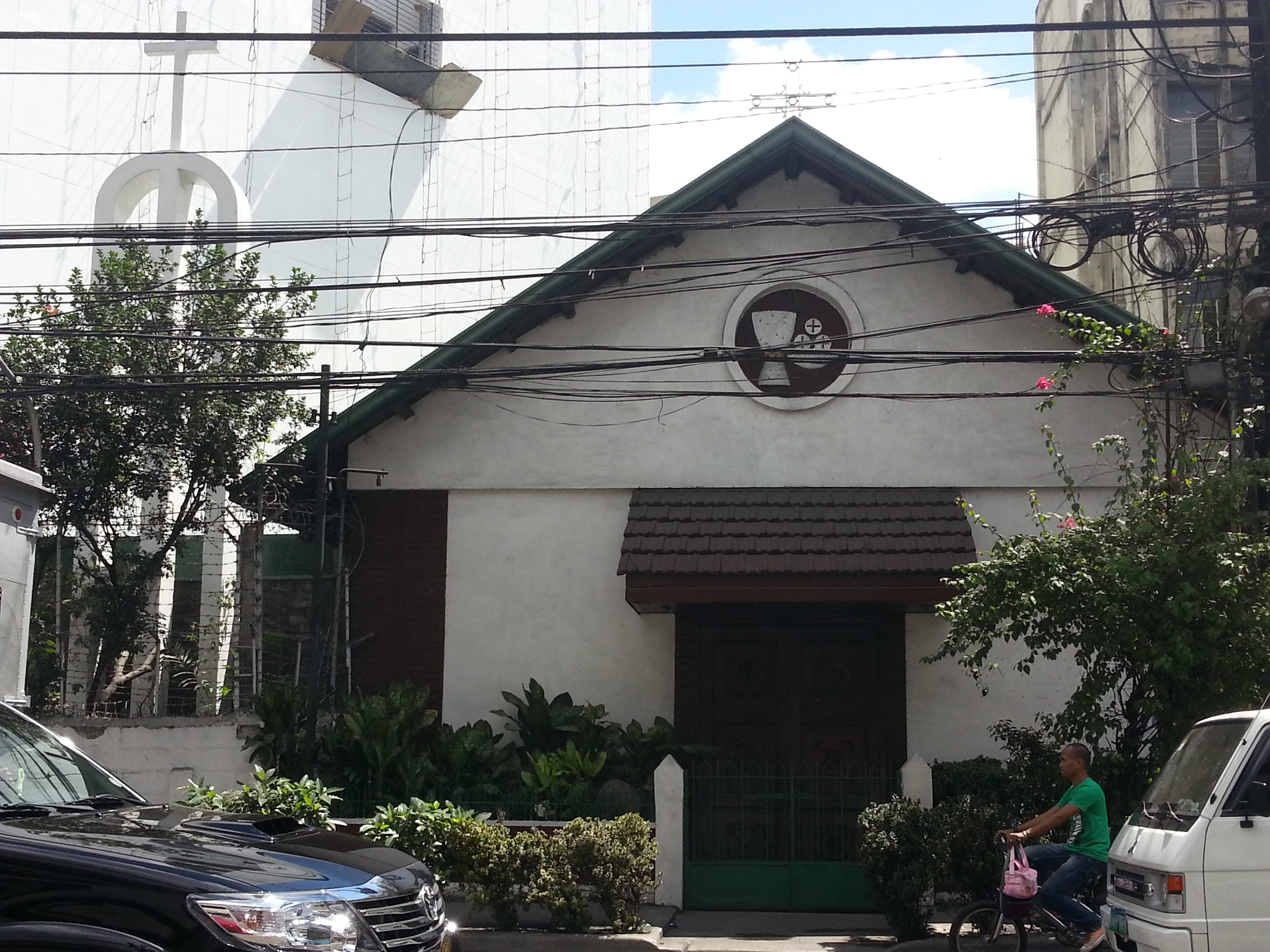
- Facade of the church
- Saint Peter's Episcopal Church
- 14.605091°N 120.974735°E
- Location: Binondo, Manila
- Country: Philippines
- Denomination: Episcopal

History
- Founded: 1931
- Dedication: Peter the Apostle

Saint Peter's Episcopal Church ministered mainly to the Cantonese-speaking people in Manila, in the Philippines. The church is "derived" from Saint Stephen's Parish Church in Manila, which ministers the mainly Fookien-speaking people. It is located along Reina Regente Street, in Binondo, Manila.

== History ==
Familiarity and ease of using Cantonese language prompted Bishop Governeur Frank Mosher, Fr. Studley and Lo Fo Hing to attend the South China Church General Assembly in April 1924 and thought of recruiting a Cantonese-speaking preacher. Bishop Mosher was introduced to a theology student, Yap Yat Tsing, who later introduced the former to Sham Hon San. He entered the seminary and graduated in 1929 upon the recommendation of Bishop Mosher.

Yap came to Manila to minister among the Cantonese at the Saint Stephen's Parish Church in Manila, however, the Cantonese attendants during the Sunday worship service didn't seem to improve. Tsing heard of an old woman named Mrs. Leung who is a member of Guangzhou Baptist Church in China and invited her to attend the Sunday worship service at the Saint Stephen's Parish Church in the Philippines. Through her, Cantonese attendants improved and became a breakthrough.

The Cantonese-speaking Chinese congregation at Saint Stephen's Parish Church grouped themselves to form a separate Church in 1931. The name Saint Peter was adopted and the first site for worship was held at the second floor of a house at 592 Gandara corner Ongpin Streets. Bishop Mosher officiated the first worship service on February 21, 1932. The Church moved to a new location at 574 Misericordia Street, on November 16, 1932, nine months after its first opening.

Sham Hon San replaced Fr. Studley as Rector after the latter retired in 1934. When bombing started in China, some of its missionaries went to the Philippines. Among them was Maud Yap who arrived in 1937. She became a Sunday School teacher and led the choir.

During World War II, the church was destroyed. The worship service was temporarily held at Saint Stephen's Elementary School. After the war, the Church moved to Calle Magdalena (now Masangkay Street), where the former Saint Luke's Hospital and Saint Stephen's Parish Church were located, until it finally settled at a property situated in Reina Regente Street and built a church in 1970.
