= Research Medical Center =

- HCA Midwest Division

Geography
- Location: 2316 East Meyer Boulevard, Kansas City, Missouri, United States
- Coordinates: 39°00′32″N 94°33′29″W

Services
- Emergency department: Level I trauma center
- Beds: 590

Helipads
- Helipad: FAA LID: 3MO3

History
- Founded: 1886

Links
- Website: researchmedicalcenter.com
- Lists: Hospitals in Missouri

Research Medical Center is a 590-bed hospital located in Kansas City, Missouri, United States, at 2316 East Meyer Boulevard. It is part of the HCA Midwest Division. Research Medical Center's satellite campus, Research Medical Center-Brookside Campus, is less than 2 miles (3.2 km) away.

== History ==
German Hospital was originally established in 1886 in a brick farmhouse near present-day East 23rd Street and Holmes Street. A new hospital building was built at the same location in 1911 and was renamed Research Hospital in 1918. On August 11, 1963, Research Medical Center opened at its present-day location at Meyer Boulevard and Prospect Avenue. On December 5, 1972, former President Harry S. Truman was admitted to Kansas City's Research Hospital and Medical Center with lung congestion from pneumonia. He developed multiple organ failure and died three weeks later at 7:50 am on December 26 at the age of 88. In 1985, Research Medical Center opened the Research Psychiatric Center, a 100 bed in-patient psychiatric facility on the campus of the main hospital. In 2003, Research Medical Center was purchased by HCA Healthcare.

== Research College of Nursing ==
Research Medical Center is affiliated with and shares a campus with Research College of Nursing. The school was originally established as the German Hospital Training School in June 1905 and graduated its first class in 1909. The college entered into a partnership with Rockhurst University in 1979; however, it was announced in 2018 that Research College of Nursing would once again become independent. As of 2022, the college had over 500 students attending and offers both a Bachelor of Science in Nursing and a Master of Science in Nursing, as well as post-Masters certificates.

== Controversies ==
=== Removal of same-sex partner from hospital room ===
In April 2013, this hospital was in the national news when its security staff removed Roger Gorley from the room of his hospitalized same-sex partner of 5 years. Despite Gorley having status as his partner's power of attorney, he was handcuffed and forcibly removed from the hospital due to disruptive behavior and interference with medical care. Gorley claimed that this was done at the behest of his partner's brother, due to anti-homosexual discrimination.

Later news articles reported that both Gorley and the patient's brother had been removed from the bedside at the same time, due to what a hospital statement referred to as "disruptive and belligerent behavior." The hospital made additional statements, saying in part, "This visitor created a barrier for us to care for the patient. Attempts were made to deescalate the situation. Unfortunately, we had no choice but to involve security and the Kansas City MO Police Department."
