= Baptist Memorial Hospital =

Baptist Memorial Hospital may refer to:

- NEA Baptist Memorial Hospital, in Jonesboro, Arkansas
- Baptist Memorial Hospital-Golden Triangle, Columbus, Mississippi
- Baptist Memorial Hospital-Memphis, in Memphis, Tennessee (formerly Baptist East)
- Research Medical Center-Brookside Campus, a hospital in Kansas City, Missouri that was formerly known as Baptist Memorial Hospital

== See also ==
- Baptist Hospital (disambiguation)
- Baptist Medical Center (disambiguation)
