= First Baptist Church of Manila =

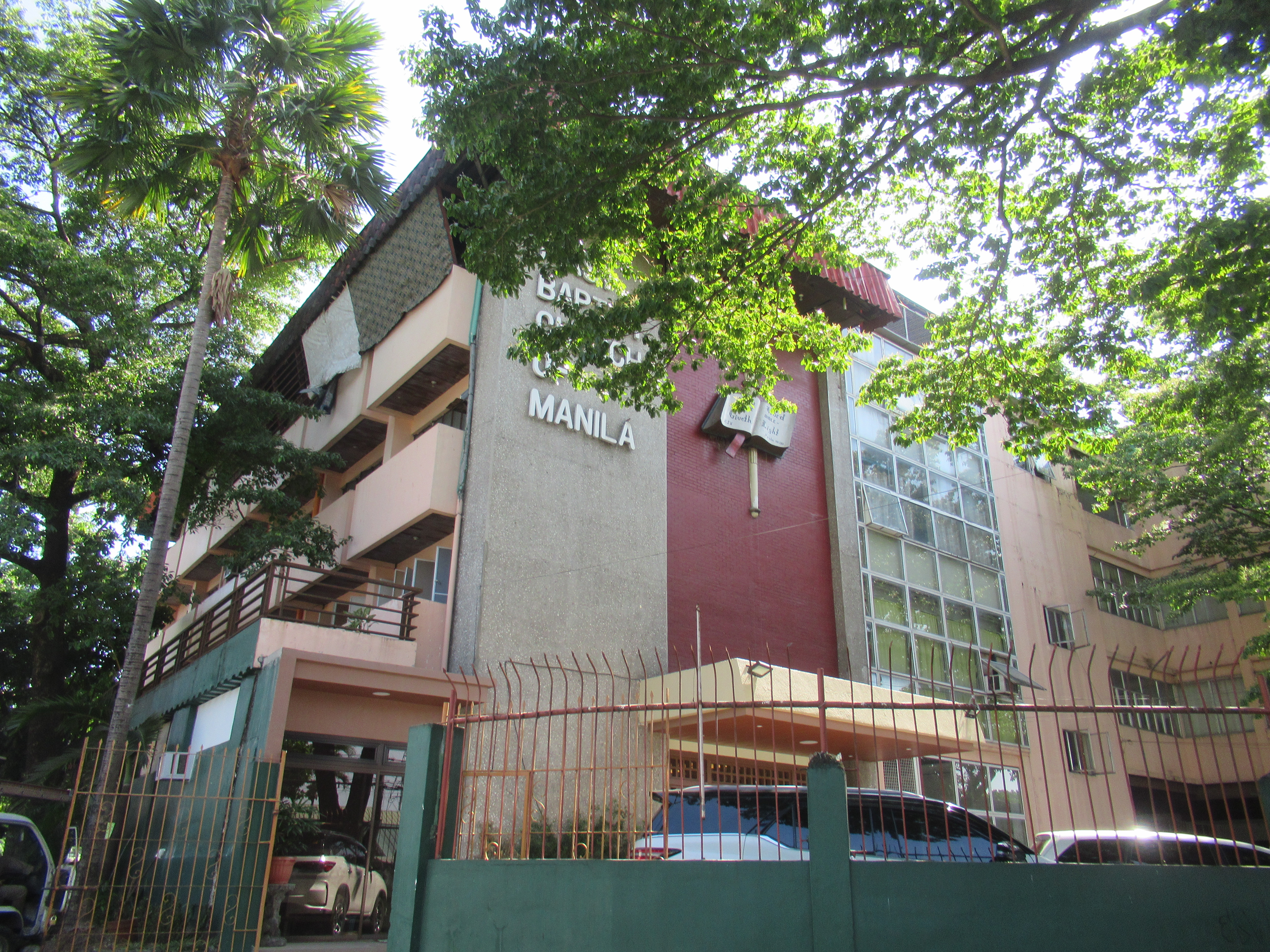
- Present location of FBCM in Quezon City
- Location: 14 Road 2, Project 6, Quezon City
- Country: Philippines
- Denomination: Baptist

History
- Founded: May 4, 1928 in Padre Faura, Manila
- Founder: Dr. Raphael Thomas

Clergy
- Pastor: Samuel Sanglap

The First Baptist Church of Manila, also known as FBCM or FirstBap, is a Fundamental Baptist church in Manila, Philippines. The church had, at first, U.S. missionaries for its pastor, but consequently, with the independence of the Philippines on July 4, 1946, the church had its first Filipino pastor, Pastor Antonio Ormeo. FBCM's current senior pastor, who took Pastor Ormeo's place, is Pastor Ebenezer T. Nacita.

== History ==
Dr. Raphael Thomas, the founder of FBCM

Dr. Raphael Thomas founded FBCM in 1928. He was also the founder of two schools, Doane Evangelistic Institute (DEI) and Manila Evangelistic Institute (MEI). Jointly with MEI, the church rented the facilities owned by Christian Missions until 1937 when MEI erected a building in Ermita on property bought by ABWE (Association of Baptists for World Evangelism) on the corner of Pennsylvania (now Leon Guinto Sr.) and Oregon (now Padre Faura) streets. For the use of the building and utilities, the church was paying twenty pesos a month. In the early 1930s Dr. Thomas transferred leadership in the FBCM to Dr. Paul Culley. The building was destroyed by the Japanese in World War II. A new church building was built on the same site in 1951.

=== AFBCP ===
The Fundamental Baptist churches which were the fruits of ABWE, BBSI and DBBI ministries formed the Association of Fundamental Baptist Churches in the Philippines (AFBCP) with 7 regional associations some of which were organized even earlier:

1. Association of Baptist Churches in Northern Luzon
2. Association of Baptist Churches in Central Luzon
3. Association of Baptist Churches in Southern Tagalog
4. Palawan Association of Baptist Churches
5. Visayan Fellowship of Fundamental Baptist Churches
6. Bukidnon Association of Baptist Churches
7. Davao Association of Fundamental Baptist Churches

Providentially, the AFBCP became a member of the International Council of Christian Churches and was frequently represented by Pastor Antonio Ormeo and Pastor Epifanio de la Pena in the early days of their involvement with the AFBCP and the ABWE. As the AFBCP was the National Association representing the ICCC in the Philippines, so was the National Council of Churches in the Philippines for the World Council of Churches (WCC). This sparked the already seething controversy between Biblical Christianity and the "Laodicean" version of Christianity in the country.

=== FECCC ===
In 1951, the Far Eastern Council of Christian Churches (FECCC) was formed at the First Baptist Church of Manila with Pastor Ormeo as president, Dr. Timothy Tow as vice president, Rev. K.C. Quek as secretary and Pastor Epifanio de la Pena as treasurer. The AFBCP became one of the original national associations that joined this Far Eastern Regional Bible Fundamental(ist) movement. In 1999, the AFBCP and the ABCLVM (Association of Baptist Churches in Luzon, Visayas and Mindanao) co-hosted the 15th FECCC Congress at the Caliraya Re-Creation Center in Laguna, Philippines. This event was a marvelous reunion of "Senior Citizens" Fundamental Bible Pastors and Missionaries in the Philippines and from the neighboring countries: Dr. K.C. Quek, Pastor Antonio Ormeo, Dr. Ernesto Rivera, Dr. Roberto Gequillana, Dr. Antolin Zamar, Dr. Mariano Leones and a host of second-generation leaders like Pastor Ed Ormeo, Dr. Quek Swe Hwa, Dr. Choi, Pastor Ebenezer Nacita, Pastor Fidel, Rev. Collado Dr. Kwang Jae and the special presence of Dr. Carl McIntire, though on a wheelchair.

== Splits in the AFBCP ==
=== First split ===
The first split in the AFBCP/VFFBC took place in Southern Negros Occidental over the Indigenous policy. Seven churches in Southern Negros Occidental (Cauayan, Isio, Caliling, Inayawan, Narra, Tapi and Linaon) formed a new fellowship called Associated Gospel Churches (AGC) because their request for a loan from the ABWE to finish the high school building that was almost finished was denied (loan not denied but diverted to other school). Ninety percent of the project was already accomplished through voluntary contributions of believers in that region. The issue of indigenization became so crucial that the fellowship was broken particularly when in the north, another school's request for financial aid was granted. The churches in the south felt that there was favoritism and special preference and so another Baptist fellowship was formed not because of doctrine or ethics but over missions philosophy and policy of financial support.

=== Second split ===
The second split came in 1965 when the AFBCP expelled three churches with their respective pastors over the issue on Biblical separation. In 1956, the FBCM decided to call a Filipino pastor in the person of Pastor Antonio Ormeo.

Up to 1957 the FBCM and BBSI were sharing in the use of church building and facilities in Padre Faura. In 1958 the Seminary transferred to Taytay, Rizal in the property bought by ABWE for the Seminary, leaving FBCM as the sole occupant of the church compound.

Pastor Antonio Ormeo

In line with the program of indigenization, the lot and church building in Padre Faura, which was built and owned by ABWE, was sold in 1961 to FBCM for the price of the lot (in 1936) and building construction cost (in 1951). A downpayment of about 10% was paid and the balance was to be paid in two installments in two years. In 1963, the controversy over biblical separation and compromise was simmering in the AFBCP with three churches and their respective pastors at the center of the conflict. Other issues were also brought out. All issues, having been clouded with other personal problems between Filipino-American leadership became impossible to solve especially because Filipino leaders were polarized to take opposite sides in the conflict. This conflict affected the contract to sell the property in Padre Faura to FBCM. With the possibility of expulsion from the AFBCP, the intention to sell the church building became subject to many questions which were pre-emptive in nature. FBCM failed to pay the second and third payments on time. Still hoping for the possibility of culminating the sale, FBCM continued to use the property during the years of uncomfortable and hostile atmosphere until 1965 when, sure enough, the expected expulsion from the AFBCP took place at the National Conference of the AFBCP in Kabankalan, Negros Occidental.

This expulsion resulted in the formation of the Association of Baptist Churches in Luzon, Visayas and Mindanao (ABCLVM) when several churches in Luzon Visayas and Mindanao withdrew fellowship from the AFBCP expressing their sympathy with FBCM pastored by Pastor Antonio Ormeo, Fellowship Center Church pastored by Rev. Leonardo Calica and Mandaluyong Baptist Church pastored by Rev. Gavino Tica, which were voted out of the AFBCP in June 1965 during the Biennial Conference in Kabankalan, Negros Occidental over the issue on biblical separation and compromise. The controversy stemmed from the accusations that the three pastors had violated the AFBCP Articles of Faith, particularly on the ecumenical evangelistic method of Dr. Billy Graham, Far East Broadcasting Company, Back to the Bible Broadcast, Overseas Missionary Fellowship, New Tribes Missions, and other missions organizations which are inclusivistic and ecumenical in their evangelistic methods. A three-day debate during business meetings was held which centered on the interpretation and application of biblical separation. The three pastors tried their best to defend their own interpretation and practice of biblical separation but to no avail. The debate ended in an overwhelming majority vote to dismiss them and their respective churches from the AFBCP. Two buses of delegates cut short their attendance and left Kabankalan, Negros Occidental and met at Caingin Beach, Pontevedra, Negros Occidental and formed the ABCLVM and organized the Gethsemane Baptist Church with members who left Calvary Baptist Church (AFBCP) and joined the ABCLVM.

== Eviction from Padre Faura ==
FBCM in Padre Faura, Manila

In 1972, just after the Martial Law was declared by former president Ferdinand Marcos, FBCM was evicted from Padre Faura on orders of the Supreme Court of the Philippines. The vacated building was turned over to Manila Baptist Church, which now owns it.

A few months before the eviction, a special event at FBCM took place at Padre Faura. The last to be officiated by FBCM in that chapel, the marriage ceremony of Loida Ormeo, the eldest daughter of Pastor Antonio Ormeo, to Pastor Ebenezer Nacita, was held. The couple, after serving at First Baptist Church in Dumaguete City, decided to help FBCM after the eviction. This situation may have been providential in the reconciliatory attitudes between the two associations in the years that followed.

== Transfer to Quezon City ==
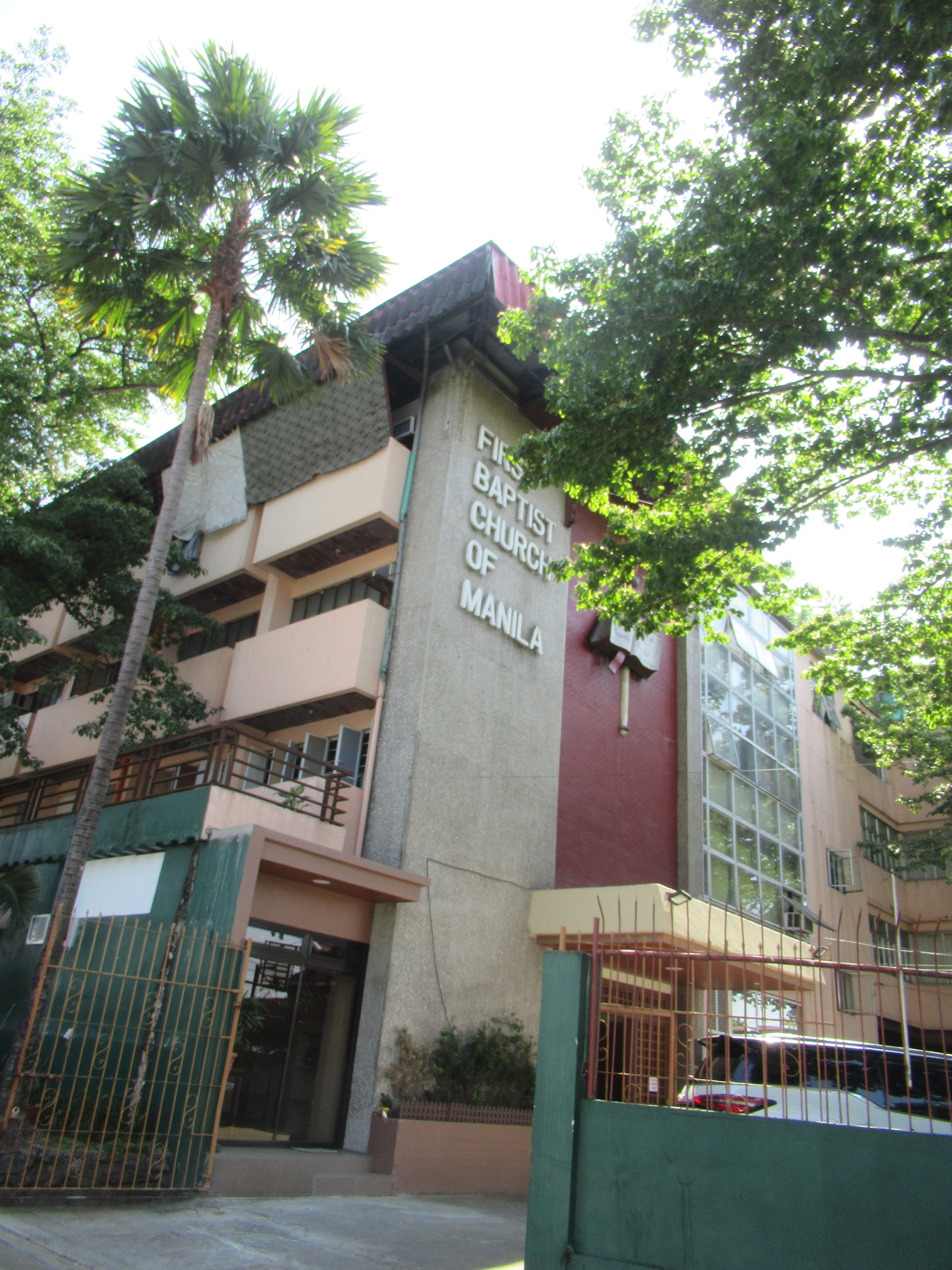
Facade, 2023

After the eviction from Padre Faura, FBCM began the construction of a temporary chapel that could seat about 80 people in Project 6, Quezon City on the lot purchased for P29,000 in 1956. The Bible School was temporarily housed at Fellowship Center Church in Sampaloc, Manila. Since Project 6 is too far from Padre Faura, FBCM spread out in four congregations: Onyx, Pildera, Victoria Homes, Sikatuna and Project 6. A lot of adjustments were made when more workers who came from other associations joined to help.

In 1976, FBCM decided to build a three-story building for the ABCLVM Bible Institute (renamed Fundamental Baptist Bible Institute) and the ABCLVM headquarters. With only P17,000 in cash on hand which was just enough for the engineering works and city building permits, the project began slowly — too slow that it took four years to finish it in 1980 with the help in the finishing stages of the construction from the brethren in Singapore. The Bible Institute was dedicated in 1981, and during the same year a four-level church building was constructed, financed mostly by the Bible Presbyterians in Singapore.

When the Bible school building was finished, the Bible Institute transferred management from FBCM to ABCLVM under the administration of American missionaries. The Bible School was renamed Fundamental Baptist Bible Institute. Conflicts between FBCM administration and the FBBI administration using the same compound and facilities developed. Interpersonal relationships were deteriorating. After eight years, the church split into different churches.

In 1984, four daughter churches of the FBCM became autonomous and indigenous. Each newly organized church shared with FBCM the burden of supporting the missionaries already in the list and each added more as the Lord moved.

- Onyx Fundamental Baptist Church, Paco, Manila (under Pastor Edwin Ormeo)
- First Baptist Church of Pildera, Pasay (under Pastor Dan Hiquiana)
- First Baptist Church of Victoria, Binan, Laguna (under Pastor Ernie Alvior)
- Sikatuna First Baptist Church, Quezon City (under Pastor Laudemar Lubaton)

== The call for a senior pastor ==
Pastor Ebenezer Nacita, the current senior pastor of FBCM

In 1987, Pastor Antonio Ormeo retired as senior pastor of FBCM after 32 years of ministry in the church and in the ABCLVM.

In 1989, FBCM called Pastor Ebenezer Nacita from Philippine American Baptist Church in Houston, Texas, United States as interim senior pastor after Pastor Antonio Ormeo retired. In the same year, the Fundamental Baptist Bible Institute pulled out from the ABCLVM to become the Metro Manila School of the Bible and later merged with Center for Biblical Studies and the Hilltop Ministries in Antipolo. In 1991, Dr. Antonio Ormeo with his sons Pastor Edwin Ormeo and Pastor Samuel Ormeo began working among Filipinos in California. Pastor Ed became pastor of the Filipino church in West Covina, California, the Christian Fellowship Bible Church. This church had been very hospitable to visiting pastors and missionaries from the Philippines including those from the AFBCP who many years ago had not been in fellowship with him. Pastor Samuel Ormeo, who pastors the Community Missionary Baptist Church in Glendale, Los Angeles, California, had set up missions partnership through scholarship assistance to deserving students at Doane. His church also has been in partnership with the missionaries of PABWE in Thailand for many years.

== The reconciliation ==
One of the instruments of the reconciliation was Dr. Earnest Gordon Wray. He retired from ABWE in 1965 after serving as director of Doane Baptist Seminary several terms from 1946. He remained an inspiration to Filipino pastors and missionaries who visited the United States and the students who studied in the United States. His attitude toward the problems he knew were happening in the Philippines as a result of the split in 1965 had been fair, balanced and restorative. He had always remained a friend to the people from the AFBCP and those from the ABCLVM. Unknown to other people he had been a silent agent of peace between the two groups.

After learning of the reconciliation taking place in Bukidnon, Dr. Gordon Wray sent a fax message that arrived about an hour before the historic decision to restore fellowship. The message was included in Pastor Ebenezer Nacita’s address to more than 5,000 delegates representing churches from across the country. Wray, widely recognized as an educator and preacher, offered brief words of support that made a meaningful contribution to the proceedings. His message prompted Dr. Antolin Zamar to suggest that the resolution be presented immediately after Pastor Nacita completed his address on forgiveness and restoration. Dr. Mariano Leones, who had represented the position supporting expulsion in 1965, then came forward and moved the reconciliation resolution. Dr. Ernesto Rivera and Rev. Amador Gapilango seconded the motion; notably, they had also moved and seconded the earlier expulsion decision, respectively. In response, the more than 5,000 delegates stood, voiced their agreement with a resounding "Amen," and applauded for several minutes. The occasion marked a significant moment of reconciliation between the associations. Those attending from ABCLVM and AFBCP churches later shared a celebratory lunch at Bethel Baptist Church and offered a clear example of collective commitment to reconciliation.

== History of ABCLVM splits ==
=== First split ===
From 1965 to 2002, many important events had taken place within the ABCLVM. The first break-away was in 1972, when Pastor Gavino Tica came back from his studies at the Tennessee Temple Schools in the United States, and started his own Baptist Association in the Philippines. Many churches, particularly in Eastern Rizal who were members of the ABCLVM joined his BIMI. His group was the first split from the ABCLVM. The issue involved was not doctrinal because he remained a Fundamentalist. The reason for the split was a shift from his former indigenous missions policy to foreign sponsorship and subsidy. With this change in the philosophy of support, he could no longer be comfortable with the ABCLVM which insisted that Filipino ministries should be supported by the tithes and offerings of the membership of the local churches or through joint missions partnership where both partners share in the burden of the work.

=== Second split ===
The second group that pulled out of the ABCLVM in 1989 was the Hilltop Ministries and the Center for Biblical Studies led by former New Tribes Mission missionaries who in 1972 joined the ministries of FBCM and who were adopted by the ABCLVM, Rev. Dan Ebert III and his two sons, Rev. Dan Ebert IV and Rev. Bill Ebert and some Filipino leaders; and later joined Rev. Willie Bona and Rev. Laudemar Lubaton, Rev. Samuel Comising and others. Issues involved were very complicated because they ranged from controversies over the Dispensational approach to Biblical interpretation; differences in philosophy of missions operation and support; Bible institute training priorities; conflicting approaches to church discipline and rehabilitation; indigenous policy; bible translation preference and other minor administrative problems mixed with interpersonal conflicts.
