= Bethel Baptist Hospital =

Private hospital in Bukidnon, Philippines

- Bethel Baptist Hospital, Inc.
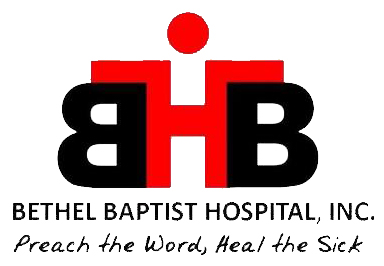

- Bethel Baptist Hospital

Geography
- Location: Fortich St., Sumpong, Malaybalay, Bukidnon, Region X, Philippines
- Coordinates: 8°09′35″N 125°07′18″E

Organization
- Care system: Private
- Type: Private
- Affiliated university: Association of Fundamental Baptist Churches in the Philippines, Association of Baptist for World Evangelism, Medical Ministries International

Services
- Beds: 75

History
- Founded: 1953

Links
- Website: bbhi.com.ph
- Lists: Hospitals in the Philippines

Bethel Baptist Hospital, Inc. (BBH) or Bethel Hospital is a 75-bed healthcare institution in Malaybalay, Bukidnon, Philippines founded in 1973. BBH is a non-profit mission institution affiliated with the Association of Fundamental Baptist Churches in the Philippines (AFBCP).

== History ==
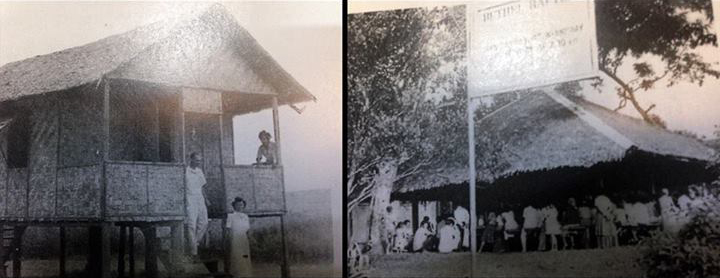
Bethel Baptist Clinic

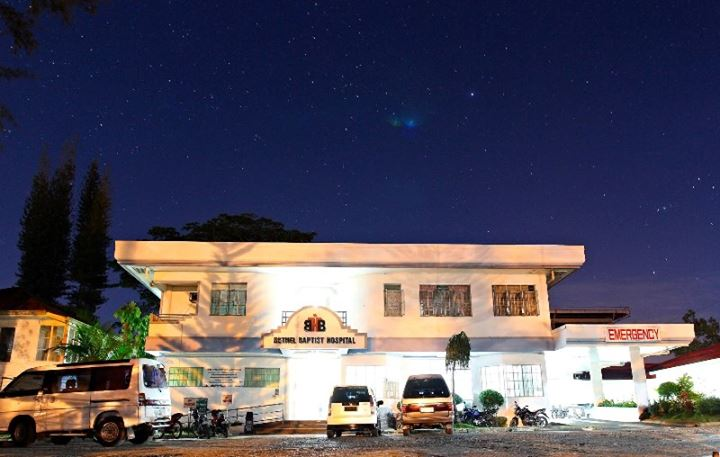
Bethel Baptist Hospital

=== Early years ===
The hospital was founded from a small medical building established about 1946-1948 by two Association of Baptists for World Evangelism (ABWE) nurses: Rhoda Little and Jeanne Waggoner. It began to grow in 1949, when Dr. Lincoln Nelson, a Naval Physician, and Mrs. Nelson, RN joined the team, and when in 1951, and Mr. Esson, a pharmacist and Mrs. Esson, RN joined the team in 1951. By 1955, the clinic had 9 hospital beds, an x-ray machine, an operating room, digital radiography room, nursery, and a laboratory. In August 1963, a surgeon named Dr. Antonio Maravilla was the first Filipino doctor to join the medical team. He later became the first Filipino Medical Director in 1966.

=== Bethel Baptist Hospital ===
On November 3, 1973, Bethel Baptist Clinic became the Bethel Baptist Hospital Inc. and was registered with the Securities and Exchange Commission. A new building was opened in 1996, which expanded it from 19 beds to 50 beds, upgraded the facilities, and had an accredited tertiary level laboratory. In 2013, Bethel Baptist Hospital opened a new wing, named the Nelson Wing in honor of the founding medical missionary, and making it a 68-bed healthcare institution with an intensive care unit.

In partnership with the local church (Bethel Baptist Church), BBH also has a teaching and equipping ministry for local pastors through the Practical Pastoral Studies (PPS), a church planting and support ministry, and serving nearby communities through medical and surgical missions, health education initiatives and feeding programs.

== Facilities and services ==
The Bethel Baptist Hospital has a 75-bed capacity Healthcare and Wellness Center.

It offers primary health care, including coordinating care with local primary physicians, conducting home visitations and follow-up. Medical Mission trips are made in collaboration with local churches, tribal groups and Medical Ministries International. Scheduled discounted surgeries are available through Medical Ministries International.

It is a member of the Private Hospitals Association of the Philippines.

== Awards and recognition ==
Its awards include:

- 2003 - Department of Health Healthy Hospital Award
- 2003, 2005, 2008 - PhilHealth Outstanding Hospital
- 2009 - Department of Labor and Employment, Productivity Olympics Regional Winner
- 2011 - PhilHealth Center of Excellence Hospital Facility for 2011

It is also a PhilHealth Model Health Care Provider, Department of Health Outstanding Newborn Screening Facility and has a consistent yearly excellent Quality Assurance rating from Department of Health Bureau of Research and Laboratory since 1987.
