= Masjid Al-Dahab =

Mosque in Quiapo, Manila, Philippines

Masjid Al-Dahab Manila Golden Mosque and Cultural Center Masjid Gintong
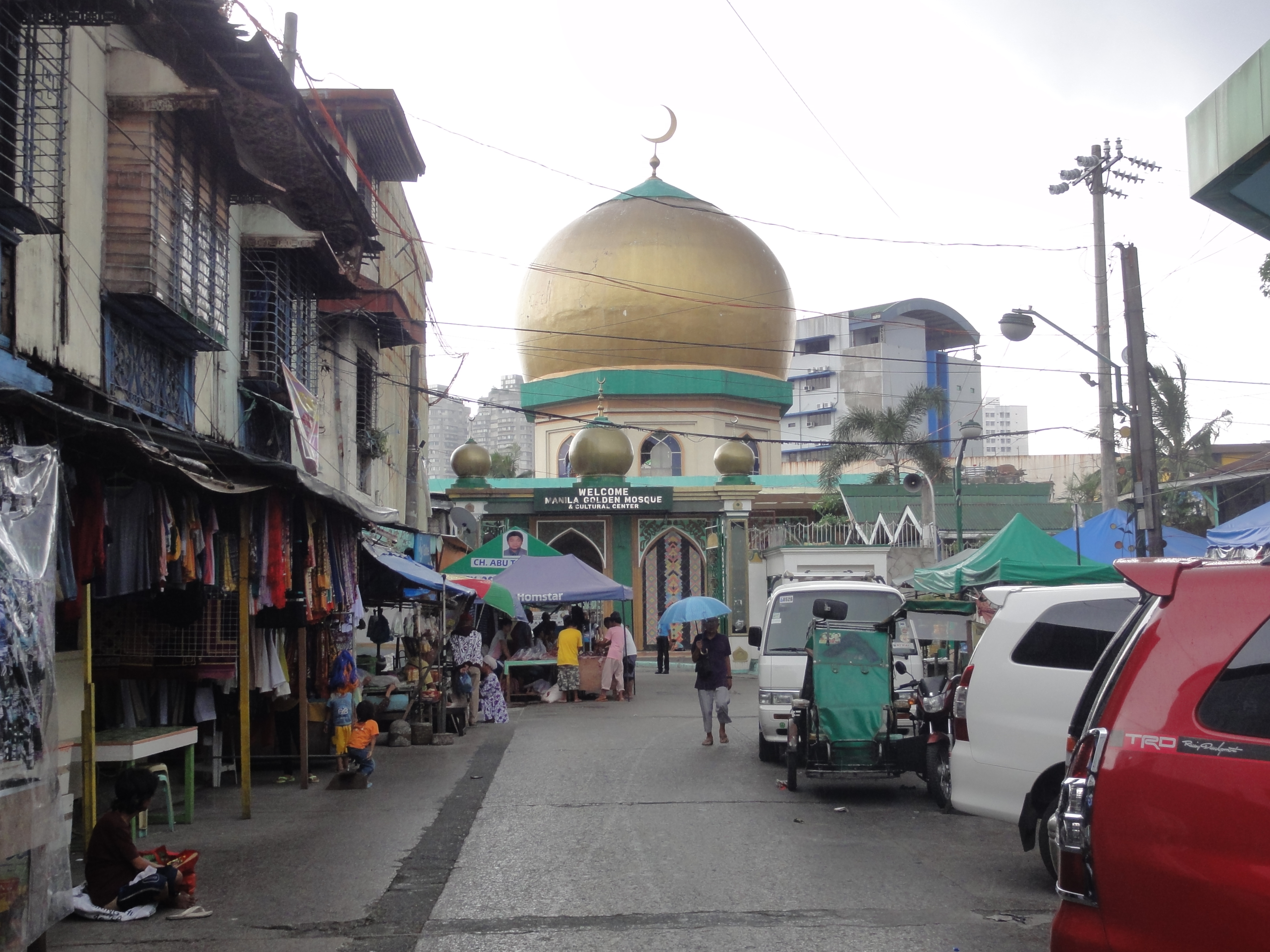
- The Golden Mosque in 2015

Religion
- Affiliation: Islam

Location
- Location: Manila, Philippines
- Interactive map of Masjid Al-Dahab; Manila Golden Mosque and Cultural Center; Masjid Gintong
- Coordinates: 14°35′44.5″N 120°59′6.5″E

Architecture
- Type: Mosque
- Completed: 1976

Specifications
- Capacity: 22000
- Dome: 1
- Minaret: 1

Masjid Al-Dahab (Filipino: Masjid Gintong), officially known as Manila Golden Mosque and Cultural Center, is a mosque situated in the predominantly Muslim section of the Quiapo district in Manila, Philippines, and is considered the largest mosque in Metro Manila.

== Background ==
The Golden Mosque acquired its name for its gold-painted dome and its location on Globo de Oro Street. Under the supervision of Philippine's then-First Lady Imelda Marcos, construction began on August 4, 1976, for the visit of Libyan leader Muammar al-Gaddafi, although his visit was cancelled. It was funded through foreign donations, notably from Libya and Saudi Arabia. It now serves many in Manila's Muslim community and is especially full during Jumuah prayers on a Friday. The mosque can accommodate up to 22,000 worshippers.

The mosque incorporates a mixture of foreign and local influences. Its dome and erstwhile minaret are patterned after Middle Eastern structures, whereas its geometric designs borrow much from the colours and variations of ethnic Maranao, Maguindanao, and Tausug art. The curved lines are based on the serpent motifs in Maranao art. The mosque used to exhibit stained glass panels by artist Antonio Dumlao. The glass panels are now at the Far Eastern University.

According to the mosque administrators, the minaret was torn down due to problems in structural integrity at the time of then-Mayor Lito Atienza. There were already plans to rebuild the minaret as donations from all over the world are pouring in to reach the target of ₱12 million. The measurement of its dome is 12 meters (39 ft) in diameter and 10 meters (33 ft) in height.

== Transportation ==
The mosque is accessible within walking distance southeast of Carriedo Station of Manila LRT Line 1. It is also accessible to jeepneys, buses, and UV Express plying the Quezon Boulevard, Rizal Avenue, and Carlos Palanca Sr. Street (Echague) routes.

== Gallery ==
Worshipers at the mosque

Mosque dome and facade

Prayer hall inside mosque

== See also ==
- Islam in the Philippines
