= Baptist Medical Center sex reassignment surgery controversy =

1977 medical controversy

The Baptist Medical Center sex reassignment surgery controversy occurred in 1977 in Oklahoma City, Oklahoma, United States. Surgeons at the Baptist Medical Center, a hospital owned by the Southern Baptist Convention, were prohibited from performing sex reassignment surgery.

== History ==
In 1973, David William Foerster and Charles Reynolds founded the Gender Identity Foundation at the Baptist Medical Center for the purpose of providing care to transgender patients. It was composed of six doctors, including Foerster, Reynolds, Fenton Sanger, and endocrinologist Jonathan Drake.

By 1977, Oklahoma City was one of the major American centers for sex reassignment surgery (SRS) for transsexual people. The number of surgeries rivaled those of Stanley Biber of Trinidad, Colorado. Most of the patients were trans women. The hospital was one of about seven U.S. hospitals offering sex reassignment surgery.

The surgical procedures offered by Foerster and Reynolds were penile inversion procedures. The famous transsexual actress and activist Christine Jorgensen came to Oklahoma in the late seventies to have some minor corrective surgery on her surgically created genitals. The Oklahoma team handled Jorgensen's care at this time. The surgical team required patients to pay in full prior to any genital surgeries. Each patient was required to sign a waiver that they would never sue for malpractice if anything went wrong with the SRS procedures.

== Controversy ==
In July 1977, the Baptist General Convention of Oklahoma (a state convention of the Southern Baptist Convention) learned that the Gender Identity Foundation had performed more than fifty SRS procedures. Joe L. Ingram, then the state convention's executive director, issued a moratorium on SRS at Baptist Medical Center, until a final decision could be made.

Gene Garrison, an Oklahoma City pastor who was on the hospital's Board of Directors, supported sex reassignment surgery, calling it "a Christian procedure". He seemed confused about the details, however, believing that post-op trans women could menstruate and get pregnant. Foerster and Reynolds released a statement saying "If Jesus Christ were alive today, undoubtedly he would render help and comfort to the transsexual as he did the leper, the blind and the lame". The hospital's medical staff and lay advisory board voted overwhelmingly to continue allowing SRS. Foerster told the press that "We won't even touch the patients until they have lived as a woman for two years. Our work ranks up there with that of Johns Hopkins." Foerster mentioned that a few transsexual patients treated by the team had committed suicide. In one case, a trans man who had cancer committed suicide; Foerster blamed his suicide on the cancer.

Reynolds had his 25-year-old son appear with some post-op trans women at the meeting to decide the fate of the procedures at Baptist Medical Center. Many of Foerster's post-op patients were male to female transsexuals who were in the sex trade. Reynold's son told The Daily Oklahoman newspaper that 'these women are genetically female'. The wife of Foerster told The Daily Oklahoman, "my husband won't abandon these people. One of his latest patients is a psychotherapist from a neighboring state".

On 14 October 1977, the Board of Directors of the Baptist General Convention of Oklahoma voted 54–2 to ban SRS at Baptist Medical Center. Curtis Nigh, a pastor from Midwest City, Oklahoma, opposed the decision. Foerster warned that the vote would cause Baptists to be "viewed as bigoted buffoons". At the time of the decision, Baptist Medical Center had been offering SRS for four years, 50 transsexual people had had SRS there, and another 50 were in the process of transitioning.

Foerster told the press that "this is a disease probably beginning in early embryonic life best treated by surgical methods". Pastor Curtis Nigh stated to The Daily Oklahoman newspaper that "this is about healing for women who feel trapped in men's bodies". A post-op transsexual patient of Foerster stated to the Oklahoma news media that "I think they do better work here. I know a gal who had surgery in Colorado (performed by Biber) and she ended up having a colostomy. I have everything that a woman has including the sensitivity". The patient then ended with a sexually explicit description of her post op sex life and the functioning of her spongiform clitoris structure.

== Aftermath ==
Foerster and the Gender Identity Foundation appealed, but without success. They then transferred their operation to University Hospital, which had been allowing a small number of SRS procedures. University Hospital ended its SRS program in 1981, leaving no hospital in Oklahoma that provided sex reassignment surgery.

== Current situation ==
Sex reassignment surgery still occurs in Oklahoma, but the state is not a major center for SRS. Foerster continues to provide SRS for trans women and top and bottom surgery for trans men. A few other doctors, including the Oklahoma Memorial Hospital Gender Reassignment Program, provide FTM top and bottom surgery. Most transsexual Oklahomans have their surgery in Colorado or Thailand. In the decades since the controversy, Charles Reynolds has died. Fenton Sanger no longer takes part in SRS procedures.

Both Pastors Gene Garrison and Curtis Nigh in time left the Southern Baptist convention. Garrison later moved to North Carolina and he died in 2017 at age 85. Nigh continued his counseling practice but also served on the ministerial staff of the United Methodist congregation 'Church of the Servant' in Oklahoma City until his retirement. He died in 2022.

Before retirement, plastic surgeon Foerster was responsible for creating and patenting the foerster clamp used in body piercing. He is now retired from his medical practice and is 81 years of age as of March 2015.
