= Association of Fundamental Baptist Churches in the Philippines =

The Association of Fundamental Baptist Churches in the Philippines (AFBCP) is an organization guiding cooperative ministries of Independent Baptist churches on the islands of the Philippines.

== History ==
The Association of Fundamental Baptist Churches shares a common early history with the Convention of Philippine Baptist Churches. Both bodies are an outgrowth of the first mission work on the islands. The work began in 1900 with Eric Lund (a Swedish missionary working with the American Baptist Missionary Union) and Braulio Manikin (a Filipino converted during Lund's work in Spain) on the island of Panay. Neither national organization actually existed at the time of the split.

In 1927, Dr. Raphael C. Thomas was told to give up making evangelistic trips and concentrate his work solely to the hospital in Jaro. This Dr. Thomas refused to do, choosing rather to resign from his work with the American Baptist Foreign Mission Society and return to the United States. In August of that year, a group met in Watch Hill, Rhode Island at the invitation of Marguerite Doane (1868–1954; daughter of hymn writer William Doane). Out of this meeting came a new agency for sending and supporting missionaries - the Association of Baptists for Evangelism in the Orient (now Association of Baptists for World Evangelism). Dr. Thomas returned to the Philippines in 1928, settling in Manila. The first church established by ABEO and Thomas was the First Baptist Church of Manila.

World War II brought much devastation to Baptist missionary work in the Philippines, and much reorganization was required. The Association of Fundamental Baptist Churches was formed in 1948. A Philippine Association of Baptists for World Evangelism was organized in 1957 for the purpose of sending missionaries to Borneo. They now have about a dozen missionaries in southeast Asia.

The Association of Fundamental Baptist Churches and the Association of Bible Believing Churches of the Philippines reconciled at a convention held in 1997. Together, they have over 2000 churches in the Philippines. Bethel Baptist Hospital is a non-profit institution affiliated with the Association. The Association participates in the Biblical Baptist Partnership International (formerly called the International Partnership of Fundamental Baptist Ministries or IPFBM), and is a member of the Far Eastern Council of Christian Churches, and the International Council of Christian Churches. Rev. Levie C. Lumilang as of 2022, serves the body as chairman.
