= Baptist Health (Kentucky and Southern Indiana) =

American healthcare organization

Baptist Health is a health system based in Louisville, Kentucky. It consists of ten hospitals, along with affiliated physician groups, urgent care centers and freestanding emergency departments, therapy and rehabilitation clinics, and various other health-related service centers. The system traces its roots to Kentucky Baptist Hospital, the first Baptist hospital in Kentucky, which opened in 1924 at Barrett Avenue and DeBarr Street, near Breckinridge Street in Louisville.

The ten hospitals are located in Louisville, Lexington, Elizabethtown, La Grange, Corbin, Paducah, Richmond and New Albany, Indiana, for a total of more than 2,300 licensed beds. An additional hospital is operated in partnership with Deaconess Health System in Madisonville.

Baptist Health employs more than 23,000 people in Kentucky and surrounding states. The current chief executive officer is Gerard Colman.

== Hospital locations ==
The following is a list of Baptist Health hospitals (in Kentucky, unless otherwise indicated):

Hospital	County	City	Staffed beds	Founded
Baptist Health Corbin	Whitley	Corbin	221	1986
Baptist Health Deaconess Madisonville	Hopkins	Madisonville	159	
Baptist Health La Grange	Oldham	La Grange	42	1987
Baptist Health Lexington	Fayette	Lexington	434	1954
Baptist Health Louisville	Jefferson	Louisville	486	1924
Baptist Health Paducah	McCracken	Paducah	176	1953
Baptist Health Richmond	Madison	Richmond	50	
Baptist Health Hardin	Hardin	Elizabethtown	262	
Baptist Health Floyd	Floyd	New Albany, Indiana	248	1953

Additionally, in May 2022 Baptist Health announced plans for a new hospital in Crestwood, in Oldham County, to be built in coordination with the New Urbanist planned community Clore Station. While no timeline for hospital construction has been announced, construction at Clore Station is expected to begin in 2026.
