= Research Medical Center-Brookside Campus =

- HCA Midwest Division

Geography
- Location: 6601 Rockhill Road, Kansas City, Missouri, United States
- Coordinates: 39°00′25″N 94°34′40″W

Services
- Emergency department: Yes

Links
- Website: researchmedicalcenter.com/brookside-campus/
- Lists: Hospitals in Missouri

Research Medical Center - Brookside Campus is an outpatient hospital located in the Brookside neighborhood of Kansas City, Missouri at 6601 Rockhill Road. It is part of the HCA Midwest Division.

== History ==
Research Medical Center - Brookside Campus was originally established as Baptist Memorial Hospital in 1945. It merged with Trinity Lutheran Hospital in 2001 to form Baptist-Lutheran Medical Center. HCA Healthcare took ownership of Baptist-Lutheran Medical Center in 2003 as part of its purchase of Midwest Health. In 2006, the inpatient portion of the hospital was closed and all inpatient services were transferred at that time to Research Medical Center, an existing inpatient hospital and trauma center less than 2 miles (3.2 km) away. The emergency department and outpatient services remained open, and the facility was renamed Research Medical Center - Brookside Campus to show that it had become a satellite facility of Research Medical Center. In 2016, it was announced that the old hospital tower would be converted into a senior continuum-of-care community.

In October 2025, construction began on a $35 million, 20,000-square-foot facility on Holmes Road to replace the campus's existing emergency department. The existing emergency department will remain operational during the construction period, with completion expected in late 2026. The new department will include 22 emergency care rooms and expanded diagnostic services.
