= Saint Stephen's Parish Church (Manila) =

Anglican church in Manila, Philippines

- The Saint Stephen’s Episcopal Parish
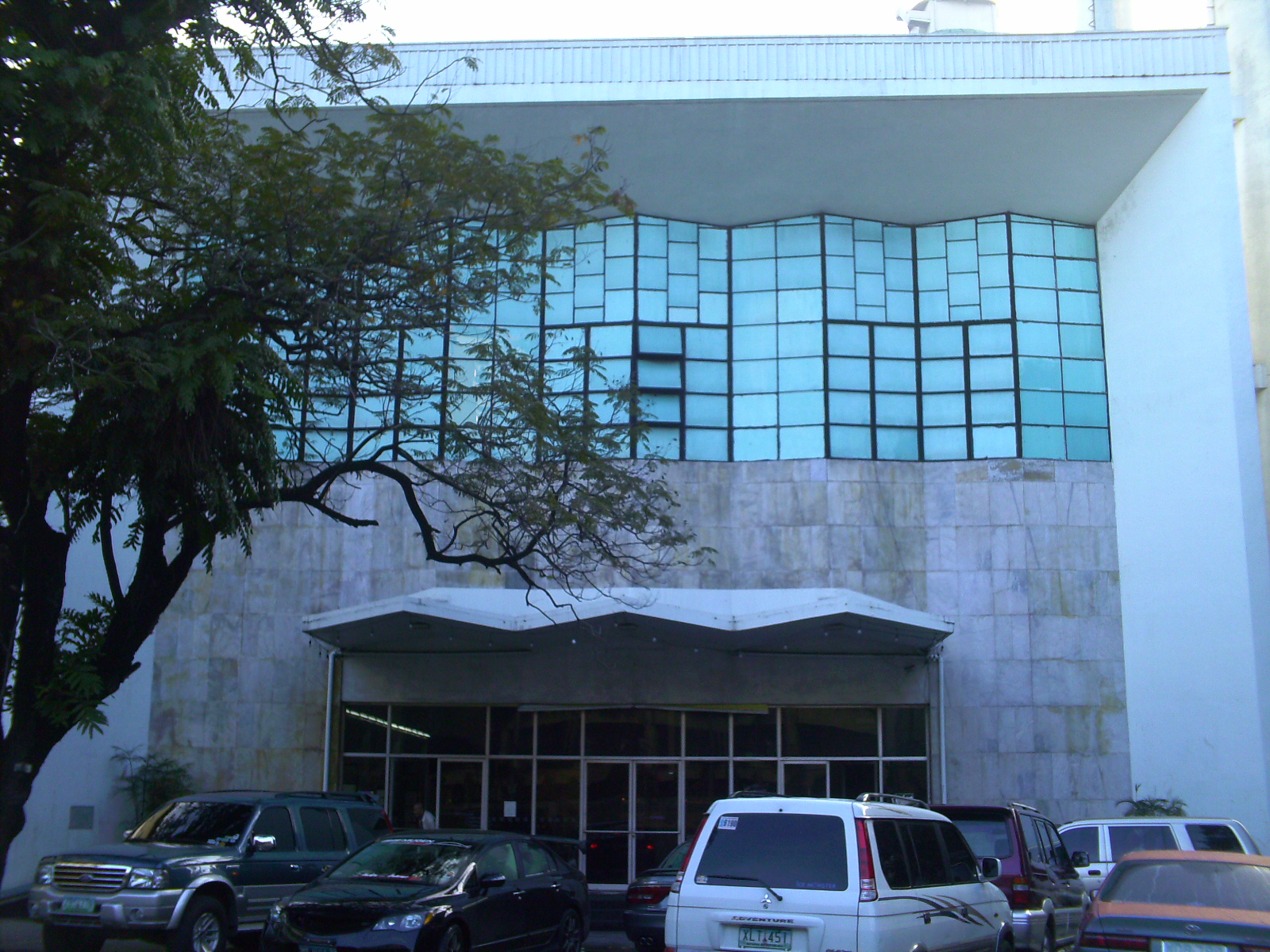
- Entrance to the Parish

- Location within Metro Manila
- 14.608357°N 120.978323°E
- Location: 1267 G. Masangkay St., Santa Cruz, Manila
- Country: Philippines
- Denomination: Episcopal Church in the Philippines
- Website: http://sspmanila.org/

Architecture
- Completed: 1964

Specifications
- Capacity: 1,000

Clergy
- Rector: Acting Rector Rev. Justin Fung
- Pastor(s): Ptr. Harold Uy, Ptr. Aileen S. Fung

Saint Stephen's Parish Church is the Episcopal Diocese of the Central Philippines' Pro-Cathedral of the Episcopal Church in the Philippines serving Chinese communities located in Santa Cruz, Manila in the Philippines. It was established in 1903.

== History ==
Saint Stephen's was originally an Anglo-American congregation in 1902 before it became a parish in 1904. Fr. Clapp and his assistant Fr. Talbot served the Chinese communities in Manila.

A Reformed Church Missionary, Mr. Hobart Studley, and his wife, Edith came to the Philippines and held the first Amoy service to Amoy-speaking Chinese regardless of religious affiliation in 1903 in a rented room in San Fernando Street in Manila. They then moved to another quarter on 64 Calle Nueva (now A. Mabini Street) when growth of the members became inevitable. During this time, Mr. Studley was ordained as priest.

Fr. Studley's and his assistant, Mr. Ben Ga Pay who later became deacon, took on their mission work among the Chinese from the Methodist Church. In 1911, they bought a lot along Reina Regente Street and built a rectory and two-storey building intended for worship services, classrooms and quarters for the staff.

Rev. Hsi Jen Wei took charge of the church in 1939 until it became a full-blown parish in just two years under his leadership. He became the first rector of the church.

In 1941, the rectory and the building, where the worship service was held, were bombed during the Japanese occupation in the Philippines. After the war, part of Calle Magdalena (now G. Masangkay Street), where the old St. Luke's Hospital and St. Luke's Pro-Cathedral was situated, were turned over to the parish in 1947 as part of the church-rebuilding project.

In 1963, a new church building with a seating capacity of 1,000 was constructed. The church was designed by Arch. Manuel Go Sr. of Manuel S. Go Architects (currently known as GGG Partners), a renowned architect known for his signature Brutalist architecture style.

An activity building and rectory were constructed in 1975 and named as H.J. Wei Building in honor of the first rector and John Pan Rectory, the second rector, respectively.

== Gallery ==
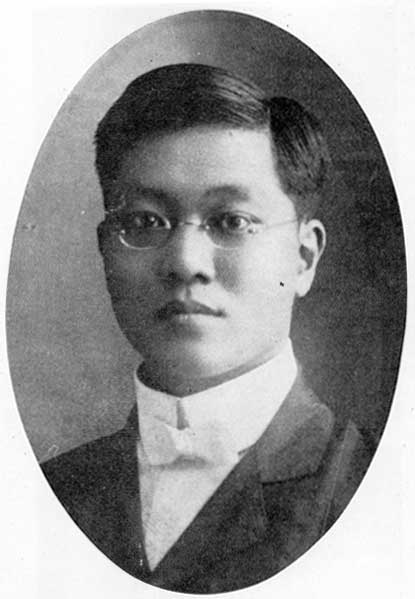
Rev. Ben Ga Pay

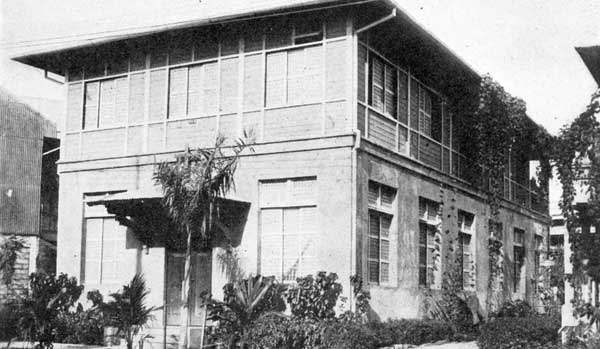
Saint Stephen's Church in Manila (1923)

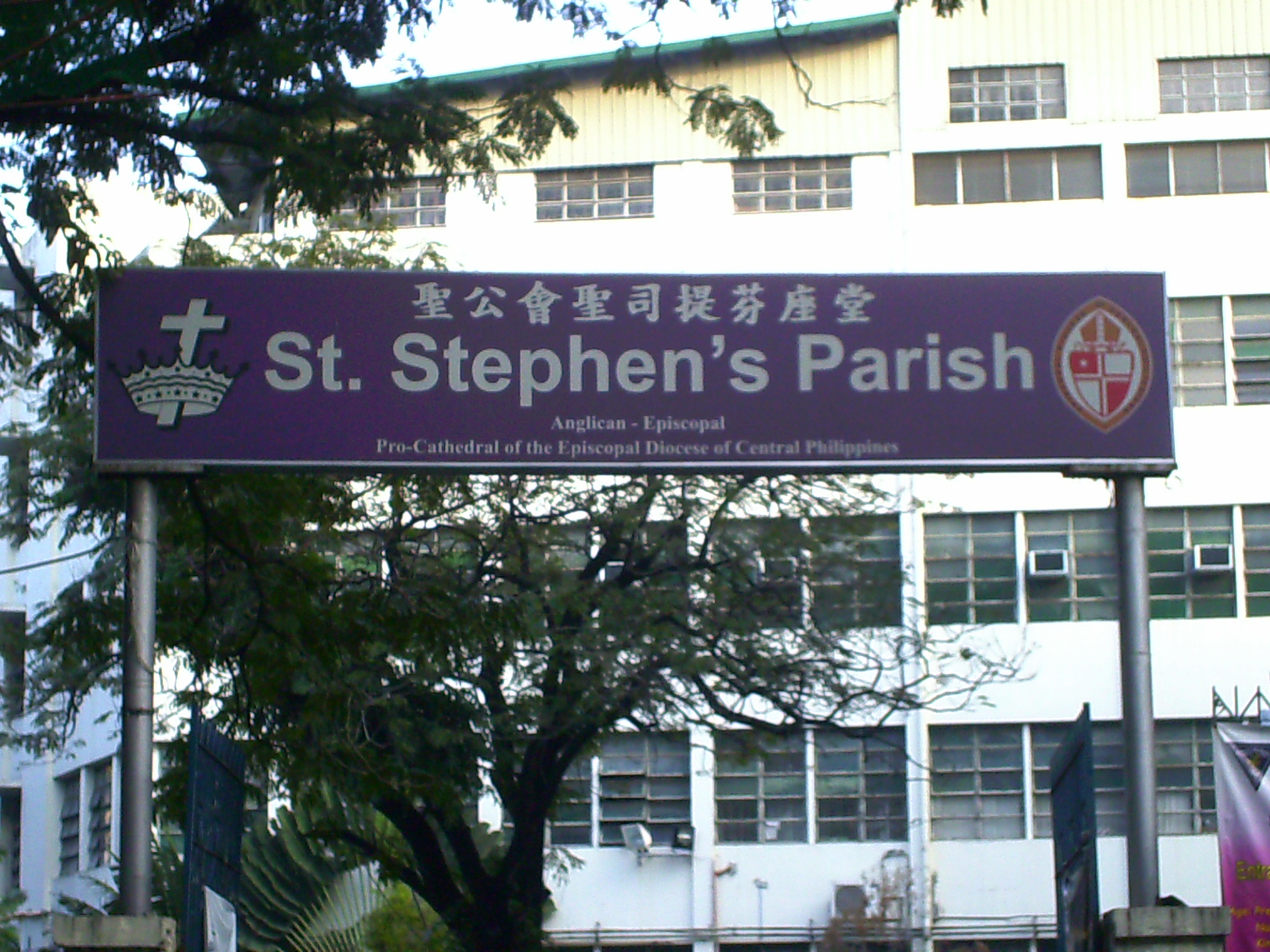
Entrance to the Parish

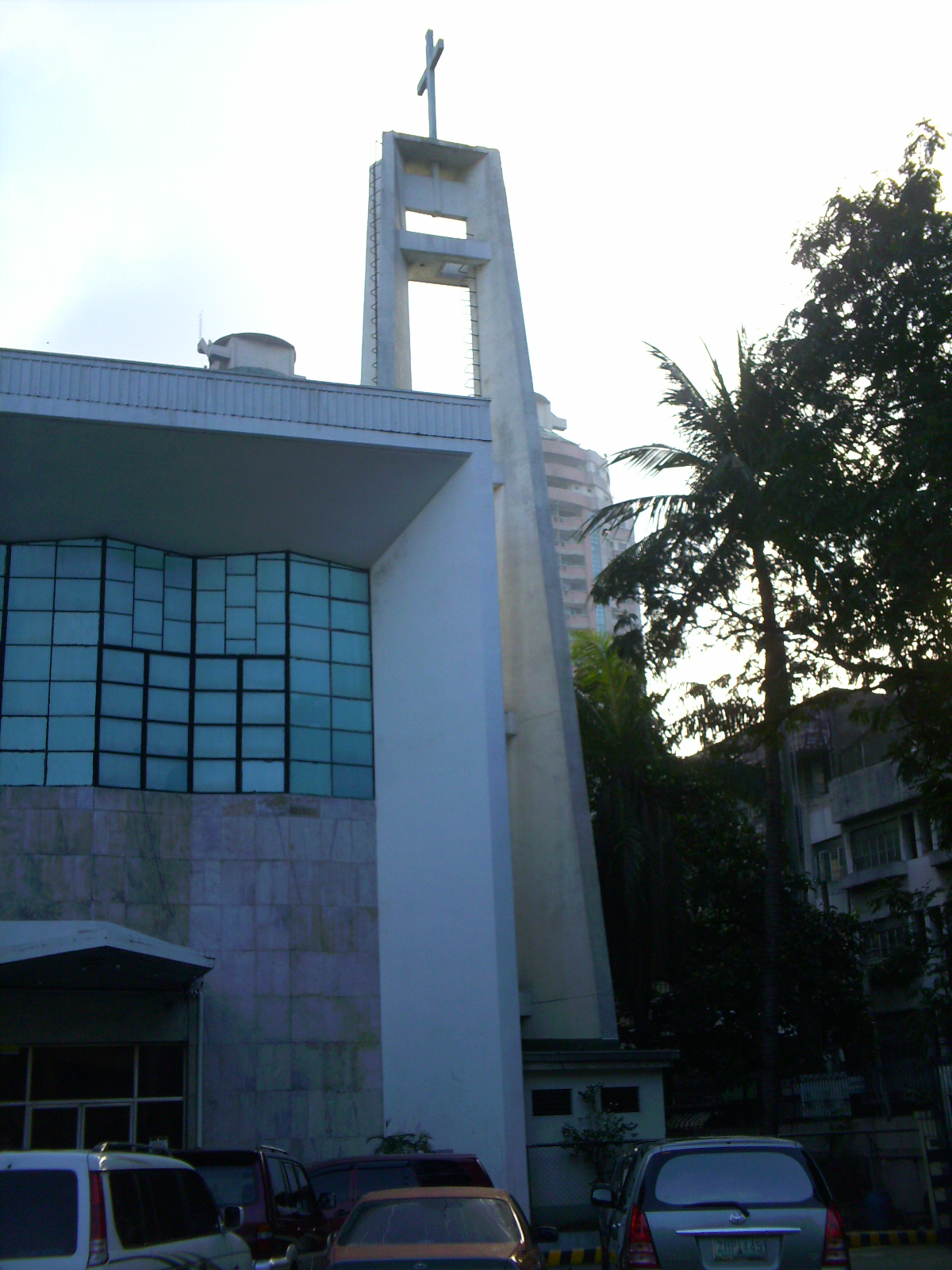
Tower of Saint Stephen's Pro-Cathedral

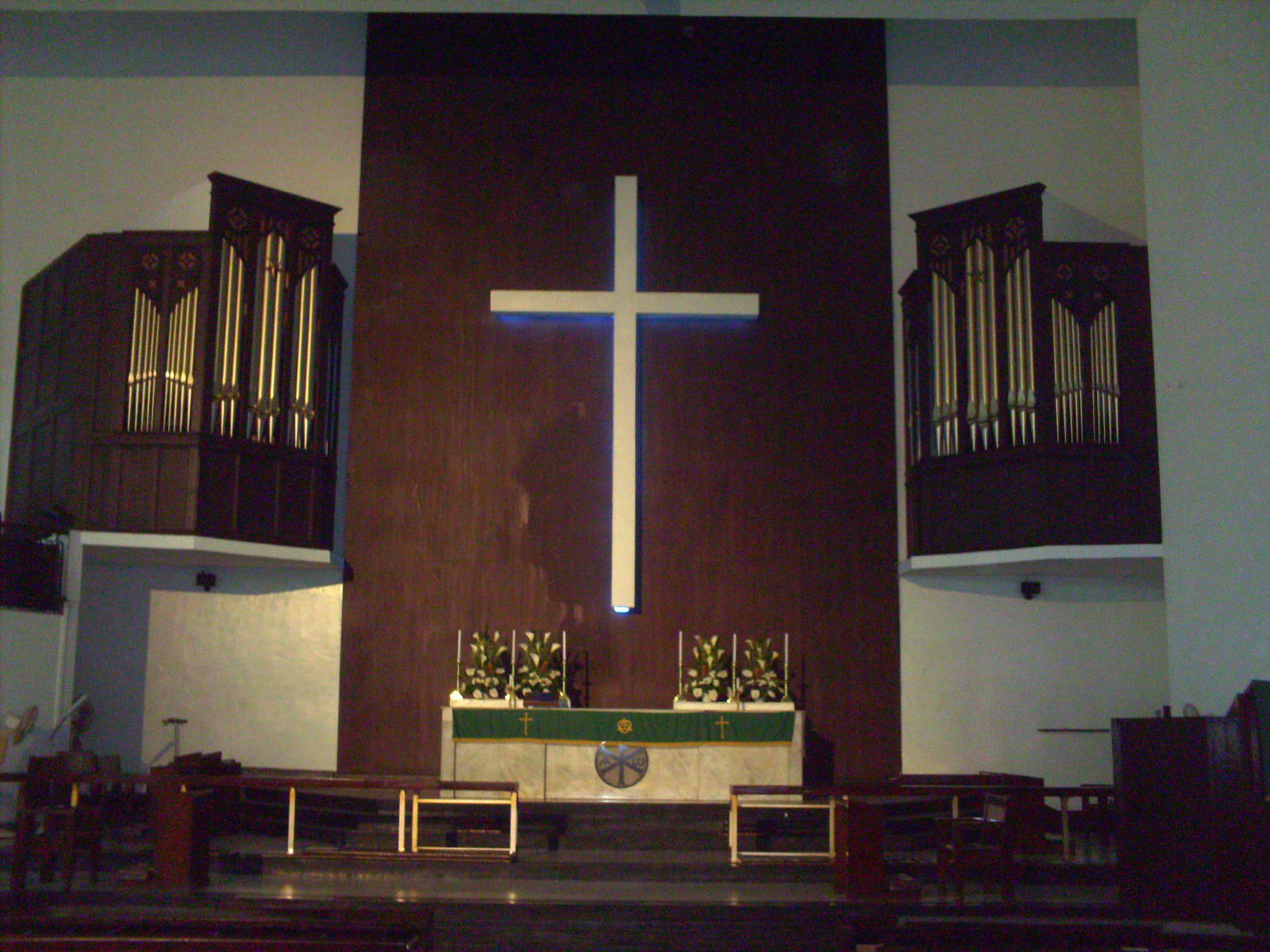
Altar

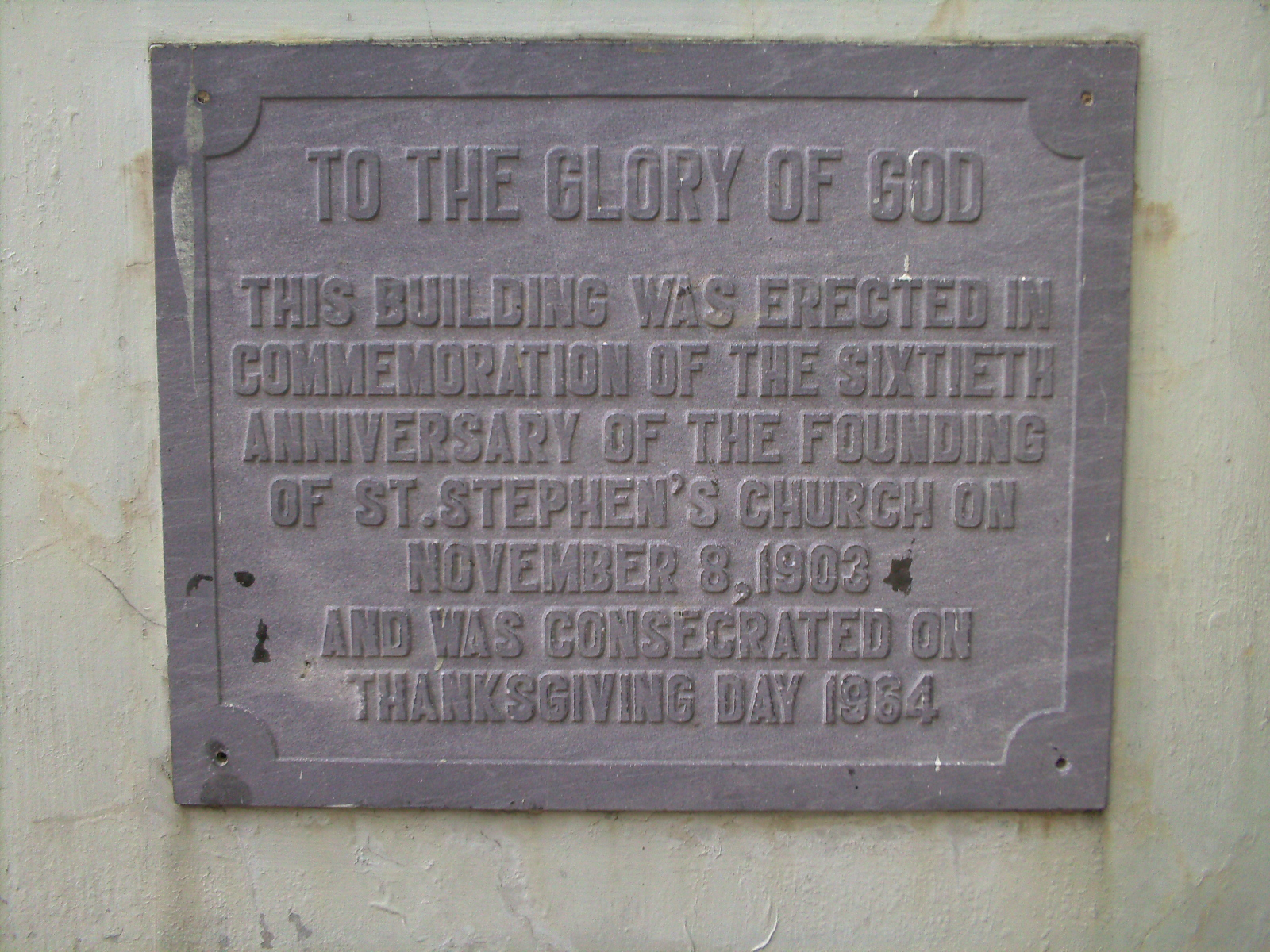
Dedication Tablet

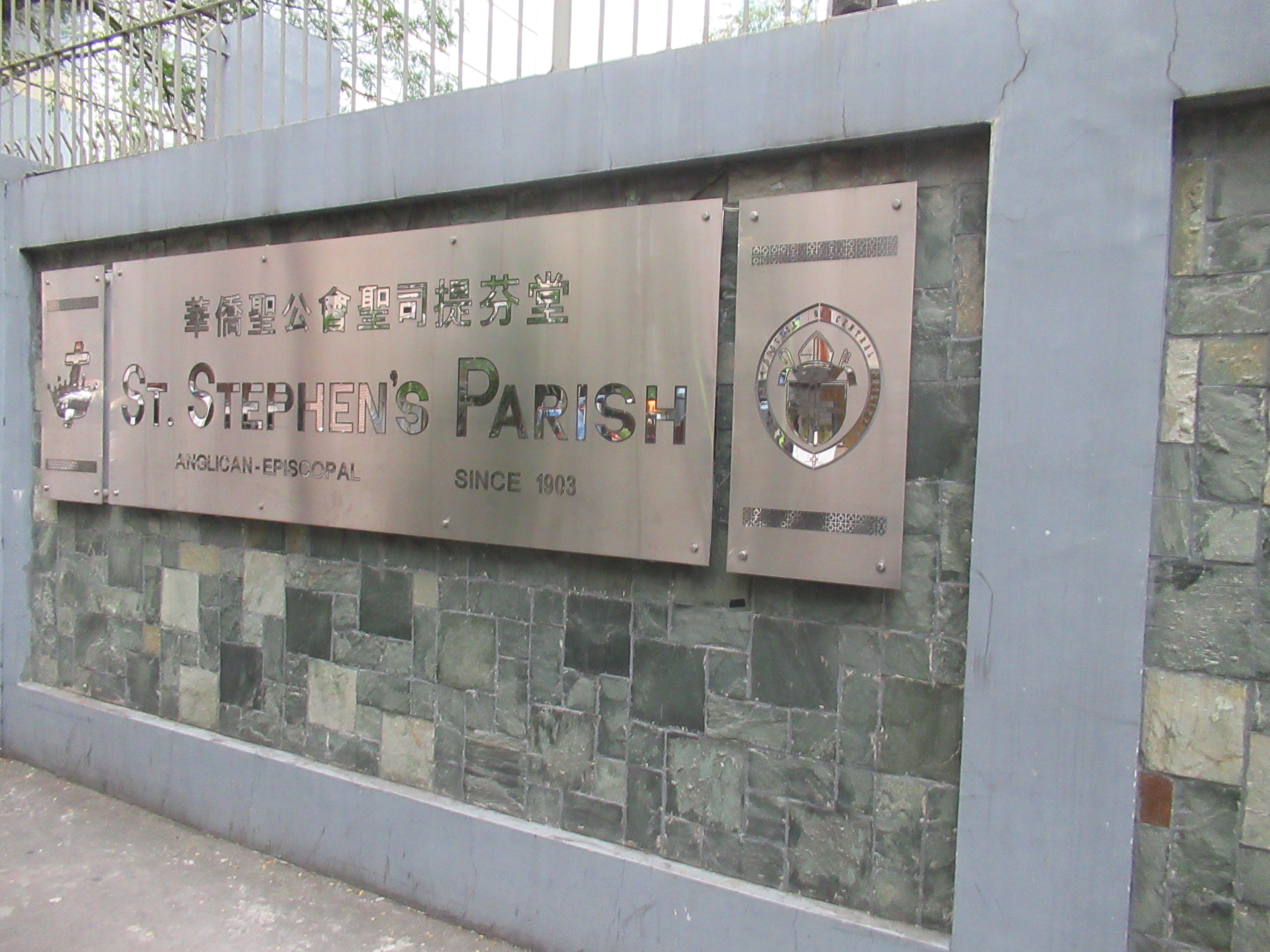
Gate

== See also ==
- Episcopal Church in the Philippines
