= Trans-Mississippi Amateur =

Annual amateur golf tournament

The Trans-Mississippi Amateur or Trans-Miss Amateur is an annual amateur golf tournament. It is organized by the Trans-Mississippi Golf Association and was first played in 1901. It is played at a different course each year that is located near or west of the Mississippi River. From 1987 to 2009, the field has been limited to mid-amateurs (age 25 or greater). From its inception through the 2009 event, it was played in two parts, a 36-hole stroke play competition to determine a 64 player field for the match play competition. Beginning in 2010, it is a 54-hole stroke play tournament, with no age restrictions on entries.

In December 2021, the Trans-Mississippi Amateur joined with six other tournaments to form the Elite Amateur Golf Series.

== Winners ==
Year	Winner	Runner(s)-up	Venue	Location
2026	Parker Sands	Ryder Cowan; Hugo Thyr	Southern Hills Country Club	Tulsa, Oklahoma
2025	Lance Simpson	Cooper Schultz	Pfau Course	Bloomington, Indiana
2024	Drew Goodman	Will Sides	Flint Hills National Golf Club	Andover, Kansas
2023	Jake Holbrook	Neal Shipley	Brook Hollow Golf Club	Dallas, Texas
2022	William Mouw	Connor Jones; Luke Sample	Denver Country Club	Denver, Colorado
2021	Derek Hitchner	Derek Busby	Windsong Farm Golf Club	Independence, Minnesota
2020	No tournament due to COVID-19 pandemic		Windsong Farm Golf Club	Independence, Minnesota
2019	Pierceson Coody	Paul Gonzalez	Maridoe Golf Club	Carrollton, Texas
2018	Hayden Springer	Pierceson Coody; Jake Marriott	Brookside Golf & Country Club	Columbus, Ohio
2017	Cameron Champ	Stoney Crouch; Collin Morikawa	Prairie Dunes Country Club	Hutchinson, Kansas
2016	Will Zalatoris	Ruben Sondjaja	The Olympic Club	San Francisco, California
2015	Collin Morikawa	Philip Barbaree	Flint Hills National Golf Club	Andover, Kansas
2014	Will Zalatoris	Alex Franklin	Southern Hills Country Club	Tulsa, Oklahoma
2013	Bryson DeChambeau	Austin Cook; Jeremy Sanders	Meadow Club	Fairfax, California
2012	Tyler Raber	Steven Ihm	Oak Tree National	Edmond, Oklahoma
2011	Kelly Kraft	Dylan Frittelli; Tanner Kesterson	Kansas City Country Club	Mission Hills, Kansas
2010	Scott Pinckney	Kevin Tway	Denver Country Club	Denver, Colorado
2009	Chris Kessler	Mark Healer	Flint Hills National Golf Club	Andover, Kansas
2008	Mike McCoy	Bryon Shumate	Wakonda Country Club	Des Moines, Iowa
2007	Trent Brown	Jim Lehman	The Minikahda Club	Minneapolis, Minnesota
2006	Robert Funk	David Leachman	Brook Hollow Golf Club	Dallas, Texas
2005	David Bartman	Mark Lindberg	Prairie Dunes Country Club	Hutchinson, Kansas
2004	Scott McGihon	Sam Manning	La Jolla Country Club	La Jolla, California
2003	Bob Kearney	Eric Sexton	Flint Hills National Golf Club	Andover, Kansas
2002	John Goode	James Reid	Barton Creek Golf Club	Austin, Texas
2001	Chip Stewart	Marty Sallaz	Kansas City Country Club	Mission Hills, Kansas
2000	Mike McCoy	Jim Wahl	White Bear Yacht Club	White Bear Lake, Minnesota
1999	Mike Podolak	Dan Dunkelberg	Oklahoma City Golf & Country Club	Oklahoma City, Oklahoma
1998	Dan Dunkelberg	John Olive	Cherry Hills Country Club	Cherry Hills Village, Colorado
1997	Johnny Stevens	John Hoffman	Brook Hollow Golf Club	Dallas, Texas
1996	John Grace	Terry O'Loughlin	Prairie Dunes Country Club	Hutchinson, Kansas
1995	Ed Gibstein	Pat Duncan	The Farms Golf Club	Rancho Santa Fe, California
1994	Sandy Adelman	Mike Podolak	The Minikahda Club	Minneapolis, Minnesota
1993	David Ojala	Marty Sallaz	Kansas City Country Club	Mission Hills, Kansas
1992	Randy Sonnier	Ricky Lutz	Wichita Country Club	Wichita, Kansas
1991	Mike McClung	Jeff Kiley	Lakeside Golf Club	Toluca Lake, California
1990	Bobby Godwin	Bob Finger	Oklahoma City Golf & Country Club	Oklahoma City, Oklahoma
1989	Ron Richard	Greg Towne	La Jolla Country Club	La Jolla, California
1988	Tom Merry	Greg Starkman	Woodhill Country Club	Wayzata, Minnesota
1987	Ron Richard	Stephen McGraw	Prairie Dunes Country Club	Hutchinson, Kansas
1986	Brian Watts	Neil Hickerson	Crown Colony Country Club	Lufkin, Texas
1985	Bob Estes	Bill Spangler	Hardscrabble Country Club	Fort Smith, Arkansas
1984	John Pigg	Billy Ray Brown	Hills of Lakeway	Austin, Texas
1983	Greg Chapman	Brandel Chamblee	Kansas City Country Club	Mission Hills, Kansas
1982	John Sherman	Mark Fuller	Oklahoma City Golf & Country Club	Oklahoma City, Oklahoma
1981	Robert Wrenn	Bryan Norton	The Minikahda Club	Minneapolis, Minnesota
1980	Raymond Barr	Gregg Jones	Denver Country Club	Denver, Colorado
1979	Mark Brooks	Jimmy Johnson	Hardscrabble Country Club	Fort Smith, Arkansas
1978	Bob Tway	John Shackleford	Brook Hollow Golf Club	Dallas, Texas
1977	John Fought	Scott Simpson	Midland Country Club	Midland, Texas
1976	Doug Clarke	Ed Updegraff	Spyglass Hill	Pebble Beach, California
1975	Tim Wilson	Warren Aune	Kansas City Country Club	Mission Hills, Kansas
1974	Tom Jones	Michael Brennan	Cedar Ridge Country Club	Tulsa, Oklahoma
1973	Gary Koch	Guy Collins	Prairie Dunes Country Club	Hutchinson, Kansas
1972	Ben Crenshaw	John Paul Cain	Brook Hollow Golf Club	Dallas, Texas
1971	Allen Miller	Alan Tapie	Spyglass Hill	Pebble Beach, California
1970	Allen Miller	Joe Inman	Oklahoma City Golf & Country Club	Oklahoma City, Oklahoma
1969	Allen Miller	Dean Overturf	Cherry Hills Country Club	Cherry Hills Village, Colorado
1968	Bill Hyndman	Edward Hopkins	Southern Hills Country Club	Tulsa, Oklahoma
1967	Hal Underwood	Larry Hinson	San Antonio Country Club	San Antonio, Texas
1966	Jim Wiechers	Bob Smith	Edina Country Club	Edina, Minnesota
1965	George Boutell	Jim Hardy	Kansas City Country Club	Mission Hills, Kansas
1964	Wright Garrett	Dave Eichelberger	Broadmoor Golf Club	Colorado Springs, Colorado
1963	George Archer	David Marad	Phoenix Country Club	Phoenix, Arizona
1962	Bob Ryan	Harry Toscano, Jr.	Old Warson Country Club	Saint Louis, Missouri
1961	Herb Durham	Matt Tabor	Twin Hills Golf & Country Club	Oklahoma City, Oklahoma
1960	Deane Beman	Jacky Cupit	Wichita Country Club	Wichita, Kansas
1959	Jack Nicklaus	Deane Beman	Woodhill Country Club	Wayzata, Minnesota
1958	Jack Nicklaus	Richie Norville	Prairie Dunes Country Club	Hutchinson, Kansas
1957	Rex Baxter	John Zibnack	Brook Hollow Golf Club	Dallas, Texas
1956	Charles Coe	Ronnie Wenzler	Oklahoma City Golf & Country Club	Oklahoma City, Oklahoma
1955	Jimmy Jackson	Rex Baxter	Wakonda Country Club	Des Moines, Iowa
1954	Jimmy Jackson	Rex Baxter	Cherry Hills Country Club	Cherry Hills Village, Colorado
1953	Joe Conrad	James Vickers	Kansas City Country Club	Mission Hills, Kansas
1952	Charles Coe	Buster Reed	Lakewood Country Club	Denver, Colorado
1951	L.M. Crannel, Jr.	Don Addington	Brook Hollow Golf Club	Dallas, Texas
1950	Jim English	Jack Vickers	Happy Hollow Golf Club	Omaha, Nebraska
1949	Charles Coe	Fred Newton	Broadmoor Golf Club	Colorado Springs, Colorado
1948	Skee Riegel	John Kraft	Mission Hills Country Club	Mission Hills, Kansas
1947	Charles Coe	Eugene Zuspann	Wichita Country Club	Wichita, Kansas
1946	Skee Riegel	Babe Lind	Denver Country Club	Denver, Colorado
1943-45: No tournament due to World War II
1942	John Kraft	T. Oliver	Blue Hills Country Club	Kansas City, Missouri
1941	Frank Stranahan	John Barnum	Sunset Golf Club	Saint Louis, Missouri
1940	Art Doering	O'Hara Watts	Southern Hills Country Club	Tulsa, Oklahoma
1939	Chick Harbert	Ed C. Kingsley	Broadmoor Golf Club	Colorado Springs, Colorado
1938	Ven Savage	Ed C. Kingsley	The Country Club of Lincoln	Lincoln, Nebraska
1937	Don Schumacher	Eddie Held	Cherry Hills Country Club	Cherry Hills Village, Colorado
1936	Johnny Dawson	George Matson	Wichita Country Club	Wichita, Kansas
1935	Johnny Goodman	Johnny Dawson	Wakonda Country Club	Des Moines, Iowa
1934	Leland Hamman	Johnny Goodman	Brook Hollow Golf Club	Dallas, Texas
1933	Gus Moreland	Lawson Little	Broadmoor Golf Club	Colorado Springs, Colorado
1932	Gus Moreland	David Goldman	Oklahoma City Golf & Country Club	Oklahoma City, Oklahoma
1931	Johnny Goodman	Les Bolstad	Golden Valley Country Club	Golden Valley, Minnesota
1930	Robert McCrary	James Manion	Broadmoor Golf Club	Colorado Springs, Colorado
1929	Robert McCrary	L.B. Maytag	Omaha Field Club	Omaha, Nebraska
1928	Arthur Bartlett	B.O. Winter	Wakonda Country Club	Des Moines, Iowa
1927	Johnny Goodman	James Ward	Broadmoor Golf Club	Colorado Springs, Colorado
1926	Eddie Held	Johnny Dawson	Algonquin Golf Club	Saint Louis, Missouri
1925	Clarence Wolff	Arthur Bartlett	Omaha Field Club	Omaha, Nebraska
1924	James Manion	Lawson Watts	St. Joseph Country Club	St. Joseph, Missouri
1923	Eddie Held	Richard Bockenkamp	The Minikahda Club	Minneapolis, Minnesota
1922	R. Knepper	George Von Elm	Omaha Country Club	Omaha, Nebraska
1921	George Von Elm	L.D. Brownfield	Denver Country Club	Denver, Colorado
1920	Robert McKee	Clarence Wolff	Rock Island Arsenal Golf Club	Rock Island, Illinois
1919	Nelson Whitney	Richard Bockenkamp	St. Louis Country Club	Saint Louis, Missouri
1918	G.L. Conley	Frank Griggs	Hillcrest Country Club	Kansas City, Missouri
1917	Sam W. Reynolds	Harry G. Legg	St. Joseph Country Club	St. Joseph, Missouri
1916	Harry G. Legg	W.J. Hubbell	Interlachen Country Club	Edina, Minnesota
1915	Alden B. Swift	Harry G. Legg	Memphis Country Club	Memphis, Tennessee
1914	J.D. Cady	M.A. McLaughlin	Evanston Golf Club	Kansas City, Missouri
1913	Stuart Stickney	Ralph Rider	Glen Echo Country Club	Saint Louis, Missouri
1912	Harry G. Legg	W.D. Middleton	The Minikahda Club	Minneapolis, Minnesota
1911	Harry G. Legg	Ralph Rider	Omaha Country Club	Omaha, Nebraska
1910	Harry G. Legg	William Sheehan	Denver Country Club	Denver, Colorado
1909	Harry G. Legg	B.F. Guinand	Des Moines Golf & Country Club	Des Moines, Iowa
1908	E.H. Seaver	Harry G. Legg	Evanston Golf Club	Kansas City, Missouri
1907	Sprague Abbott	Harry G. Legg	Rock Island Arsenal Golf Club	Rock Island, Illinois
1906	C.T. Jaffray	F.W. McCartney	Omaha Field Club	Omaha, Nebraska
1905	Warren Dickinson	Walter Fairbanks	Glen Echo Country Club	Saint Louis, Missouri
1904	H.P. Bend	J.T. Stewart	The Minikahda Club	Minneapolis, Minnesota
1903	John Maxwell	P.H. Finkbank	Waveland Park Golf Club	Des Moines, Iowa
1902	R.R. Kimball	Warren Dickinson	Omaha Country Club	Omaha, Nebraska
1901	John Stuart	Warren Dickinson	Kansas City Country Club	Kansas City, Missouri
