= Perry Maxwell =

American golf course architect (1879–1952)

Maxwell, c. 1939

Perry Duke Maxwell (June 13, 1879 – November 15, 1952) was an American golf course architect. He was a founding member of the American Society of Golf Course Architects and was an inductee into the Oklahoma Sports Hall of Fame in 2012. He was known as the "father of Oklahoma golf".

== Early life ==
Perry Duke Maxwell was born on June 13, 1879, in Princeton, Kentucky. He moved to Ardmore, Oklahoma, in 1897 after two forays at college where he studied classical literature. In 1902 he found the love of his life, Ray Sophronia Woods, and they married that same year. Poor health temporarily curtailed his collegiate studies but he finally graduated and settled into a banking job and eventually became vice president of the Ardmore National Bank where he would remain into his mid-30s.

In 1913, on land he owned that was the site of a former dairy farm, Maxwell built the first nine holes of Dornick Hills Golf & Country Club in Ardmore. The remaining nine holes would not be completed until 1923. Maxwell—along with other fine golf course architects of this period such as Herbert Strong and Donald Ross—was not formally trained in golf course architecture. Most golf course architects who worked in the United States during the late 19th and early 20th century were immigrants from Scotland and England whose only qualifications were their knowledge of golf and ability to play the game.

== Dornick Hills Golf & Country Club ==
Maxwell is credited with many of the great layouts in Oklahoma and throughout the United States and is commonly recognized as one of America's great golf course designers. One of Maxwell's first courses was Dornick Hills Golf & Country Club in Ardmore, Oklahoma, which hosted the 1952–1954 Ardmore Open as well as the 1954 LPGA Ardmore Open. Maxwell also built Southern Hills Country Club in Tulsa (the site of several PGA Tour events and the U.S. Open in 1958, 1977 and 2001). The Oklahoma City Golf & Country Club and Prairie Dunes Country Club also appear on Maxwell's résumé. He made major contributions to such revered layouts as Pine Valley Golf Club, Augusta National Golf Club (home of the Masters), Colonial Country Club, Crystal Downs Country Club, and Merion Golf Club. In total, Maxwell is estimated to have designed 70 courses and remodeled about 50 others.

== Scottish influence in his designs ==
The spark for a career in golf came when his wife showed him an article in Scribner's Magazine about the National Golf Links of America in Southampton, New York. After consulting with Charles B. Macdonald, the founder and architect of the club on Long Island, Maxwell proceeded to lay out four holes on a dairy farm he owned just north of Ardmore, a property that would eventually evolve into Dornick Hills Golf & Country Club where he was the first designer to implement grass greens in Oklahoma. In the early days of golf, it was common to see greens constructed of oiled and compacted sand.

In 1923, Maxwell took a trip to Scotland to learn as much as he could about the methods the Scots employed to utilize the landscape and other natural features on their courses. From that point forward, Maxwell's design philosophy was set in place. Some of his earliest works included the superb layouts at Twin Hills Golf & Country Club in Oklahoma City (host of the 1935 PGA Championship won by Johnny Revolta), the Muskogee Country Club, and Hillcrest Country Club in Bartlesville. But his masterpiece was the extension of Dornick Hills to 18 holes, a layout that was considered the best course in the state of Oklahoma for many years.

== Augusta National Golf Club renovations ==
Maxwell made a number of important changes to Augusta National in 1937. When Augusta National originally opened for play in January 1933, the opening hole (now the 10th) was a relatively benign par 4 that played just more than 400 yards. From an elevated tee, the hole required little more than a short iron or wedge for the approach. Maxwell had grand plans to improve the hole, and he implemented them by moving the green in 1937 to its present location—on top of the hill, about 50 yards back from the old site—and transformed it into the toughest hole in Masters Tournament history. Ben Crenshaw referred to Maxwell's work on the 10th hole as "one of the great strokes in golf architecture". It's important to note that Maxwell is not credited as the designer for the updated 10th hole. The 10th hole at Augusta has been voted on by members of the PGA of America as one of the ten most difficult holes in the country.

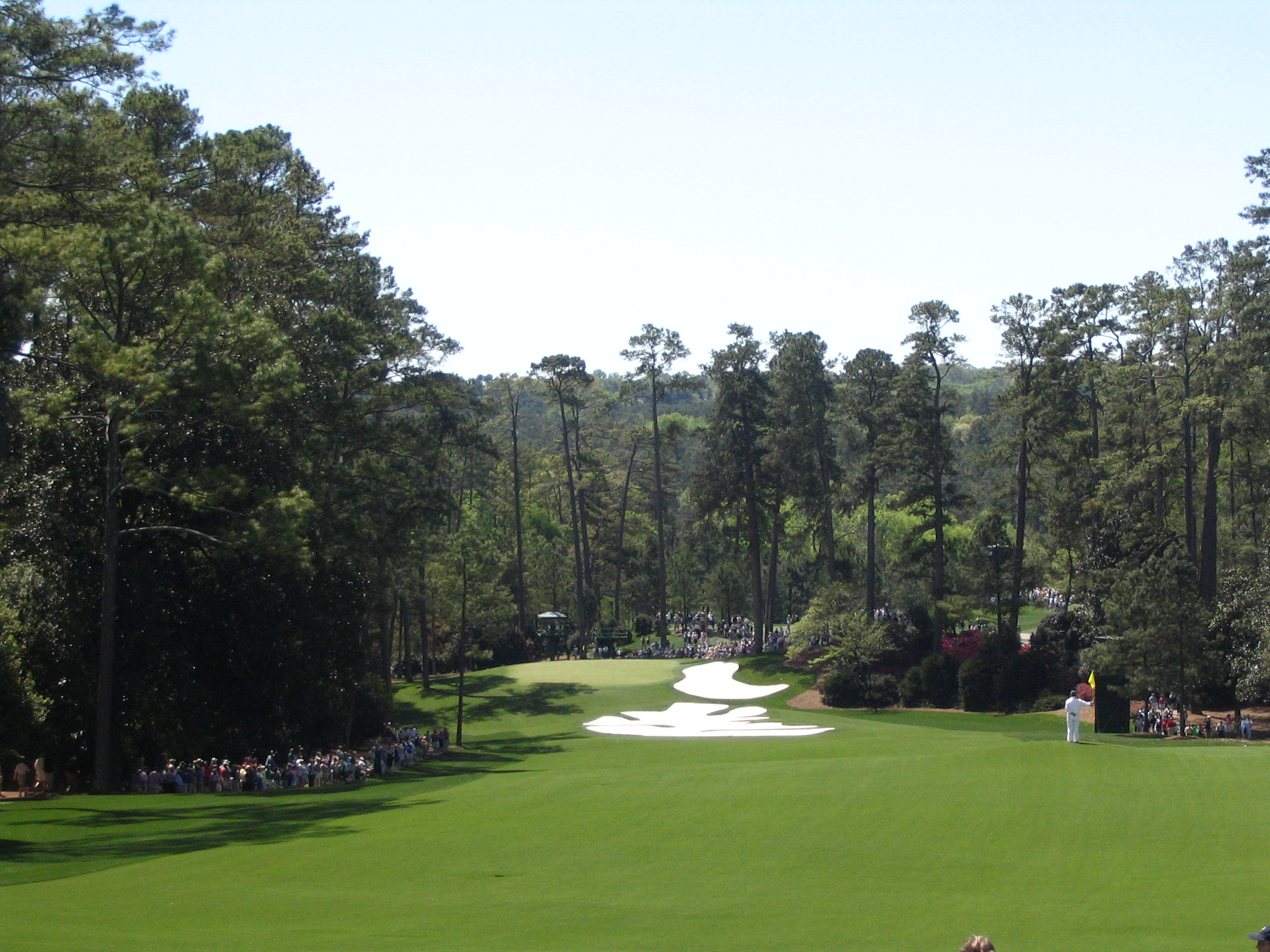
The 10th hole, "Camellia", at Augusta National Golf Club

== Maxwell's design philosophy ==
Maxwell's primary course trademarks were his undulating greens and ability to use the existing natural topography to design challenging holes. Maxwell-designed greens are typically large and contoured with swells—often known as "Maxwell's rolls". It is frequently necessary to be below the hole in order to have a decent opportunity to make a putt on Maxwell-designed greens. Many golf course designers would follow his lead in creating demanding, undulating greens. Maxwell was also a master at using the natural landscape to sculpt holes. Mac Bentley, Daily Oklahoman sports writer, wrote in 1933, "His genius came from recognizing Mother Nature's design, his courses only slightly carved out of the existing landscape".

Perhaps his favorite design feature was to include naturally occurring geological cliffs. He built a green atop a 50-foot cliff on the par 5 16th hole at Dornick Hills. The green is reachable in two shots by long hitters. Most players, however, opt for a lay up shot to set up a short iron approach to the elevated green. On the next hole golfers tee off from the cliff summit and play sharply downward to a par 3 green below. The par 3 fourth hole at Twin Hills Golf & Country Club also features Maxwell's cliff attribute.

In the 1930s Maxwell became a national force in the golf industry. In 1931 Dr. Alister MacKenzie, who with Bobby Jones was involved in the development of Augusta National in Georgia, invited Maxwell to become a partner. Maxwell had met MacKenzie during his visit to Scotland in 1919. This dynamic duo would become one of the more celebrated golf course design teams in America, creating such successful joint ventures as Crystal Downs Country Club in Michigan, Melrose Country Club in Philadelphia and what is now the Oklahoma City Golf & Country Club. MacKenzie was involved in the design process to varying degrees of each course project.

== Later years ==
With MacKenzie's death in 1934 and the dissolution of the partnership, Maxwell began the most fruitful phase of his career. This was a large accomplishment considering the nation was still in the grip of the devastating Great Depression and accompanying Dust Bowl that plagued the American midwest. During this financially difficult time he was still able to get contracts to work on such innovative designs as Southern Hills, Prairie Dunes in Kansas and the Old Town Club in Winston-Salem, North Carolina. But perhaps the most well-known aspect of Maxwell's work during this stage of his career was his renovation work. He is credited with major contributions to several of the top courses around the country, including Pine Valley Golf Club, Gulph Mills, Philadelphia Country Club, Brook Hollow, Colonial Country Club (Fort Worth), Saucon Valley Country Club in Upper Saucon Township, the National Golf Links and, perhaps his best-known redesign, Augusta National, where he did renovations on 11 of the 18 holes.

After World War II Maxwell continued working, even after losing a leg from below the knee due to cancer. But by this time Maxwell's focus was once again on Oklahoma. His son, J. Press Maxwell, had joined the business after returning from his tour of duty in Europe. The Maxwells had several notable efforts in Oklahoma in the late 1940s, including Oakwood Country Club in Enid and the University of Oklahoma course in Norman. They also did the first golf course at the Grand Hotel in Mobile, Alabama. Among other projects completed just prior to his death in 1952 were Lake Hefner Golf Club in Oklahoma City, the Oak Cliff Country Club in Dallas, Texas, and a major renovation of the Omaha Country Club in Omaha, Nebraska.

== Death ==
Maxwell died in Tulsa, Oklahoma, on November 15, 1952. He was buried in a family cemetery on a ridge north of the 7th fairway at Dornick Hills Golf & Country Club.

== Courses designed and renovated by Maxwell ==
(Source):

=== Solo designs by Perry Maxwell ===
- Dornick Hills Golf & Country Club, Ardmore, Oklahoma, 1913–23
- Norman Country Club (NLE), Norman, Oklahoma, 1921
- Duncan Golf & Country Club, Duncan, Oklahoma, 1922
- Rowanis Country Club (NLE), Gainesville, Texas, 1922
- Hill Crest Country Club (NLE), Pauls Valley, OK, 1922
- Enid Country Club (9 holes) (NLE), Enid, OK, 1922
- Henryetta Golf and Country Club, Henryetta, Oklahoma, 1923
- Elks Golf and Country Club, Shawnee, Oklahoma, 1923
- Cherokee Hills Golf Club, Catoosa, Oklahoma, 1924
- Sand Springs Country Club (NLE) Sand Springs, Oklahoma, 1924
- Glenwood Golf Course (NLE), Ardmore, Oklahoma, 1924
- Muskogee Country Club (redesign), Muskogee, Oklahoma, 1924
- Neosho Golf and Country Club, Neosho, Missouri, 1924
- Pennsylvania Golf Club (NLE), Llarnech, Pennsylvania, 1924
- Arkansas City Country Club, Arkansas City, Kansas, 1925
- Kennedy Golf Course (NLE), Tulsa, Oklahoma, 1925
- Hickory Hills Country Club, Springfield, Missouri, 1925
- Twin Hills Golf & Country Club, Oklahoma City, Oklahoma, 1925
- Highland Park Golf Course (NLE), Tulsa, Oklahoma, 1925
- Riverside Country Club, Tishomingo, Oklahoma, 1925
- Perry Golf and Country Club, Perry, Oklahoma, 1925
- Oak Hills Golf & Country Club, Ada, Oklahoma, 1926
- Rolling Hills Country Club, Paducah, Kentucky, 1926
- Hardscrabble Country Club, Fort Smith, Arkansas, 1927
- Mohawk Park Golf Course, Tulsa, Oklahoma, 1927
- Lakeside Golf & Beach Club (NLE), Tulsa, Oklahoma, 1927
- Hillcrest Country Club, Bartlesville, Oklahoma, 1927
- Hill Crest Golf Course (NLE), Wilson, Oklahoma, 1927
- Ponca City Country Club (redesign), Ponca City, Oklahoma, 1927
- Buffalo Rock Golf and Venue, Cushing, Oklahoma, 1927
- Hillsdale Golf Club (NLE), Ardmore, Oklahoma, 1928
- Jeffersonville Country Club (NLE), Prather, Indiana, 1927
- Fayetteville Country Club, Fayetteville, Arkansas, 1928
- Noble Park Golf Course (NLE), Paducah, Kentucky, 1928
- Altus Country Club (NLE), Altus, OK, 1928
- Shawnee Country Club, Shawnee, Oklahoma, 1929
- Rancho Beach and Country Club (NLE), Oklahoma City, Oklahoma, 1929
- Rochelle Country Club, Rochelle, Illinois, 1930
- Princeton Country Club, Princeton, Kentucky, 1931
- Walnut Hill Country Club (NLE), Dallas, Texas, 1932
- Hillcrest Golf Course, Coffeyville, Kansas, 1933
- Avery Golf Club (NLE), Tulsa, OK, 1933
- Iowa State University Golf Course, Ames, Iowa, 1938
- Southern Hills Country Club, Tulsa, Oklahoma, 1935–36
- Lawrence Country Club (9 holes), Lawrence, Kansas 1936
- McPherson Country Club, McPherson, Kansas, 1936
- Topeka Country Club (redesign), Topeka, Kansas, 1938
- Blackwell Municipal Golf Course, Blackwell, Oklahoma, 1939
- Mount Pleasant Country Club, Mount Pleasant, Texas, 1939
- Old Town Club, Winston-Salem, North Carolina, 1939
- Reynolds Park Golf Course, Winston-Salem, North Carolina, 1940
- Hillandale Golf Club (9 holes), Durham, North Carolina, c. 1940
- Gillespie Golf Club, Greensboro, North Carolina, 1941
- Odessa Country Club (9 holes), Odessa, Texas, 1941

=== Co-designed with Art Jackson ===
- Lincoln Park Golf Course (East course), Oklahoma City, Oklahoma, 1926

=== Co-designed with John Bredemus and Marvin Leonard ===
- Colonial Country Club (Fort Worth), Fort Worth, Texas, 1934

=== Co-designed with Alister MacKenzie ===
- Melrose Country Club, Cheltenham, Pennsylvania, 1924–26
- Oklahoma City Golf & Country Club,^{†} Oklahoma City, Oklahoma, 1927
- Crystal Downs Country Club, Frankfort, Michigan, 1928–1931
- University of Michigan Golf Course, Ann Arbor, Michigan, 1929
- Ohio State University Golf Course,^{‡} Columbus, Ohio, 1935

^{†} co-design in contract only
^{‡} construction by Maxwell, design by MacKenzie

=== Co-designed with J. Press Maxwell ===
- Prairie Dunes Country Club, Hutchinson, Kansas, 1937, 1957
- Lakewood Country Club, Point Clear, Alabama, 1944–47
- Lake View Golf Club (NLE), Woodville, Oklahoma, 1946
- Austin Country Club, Austin, Texas, 1946–48
- Excelsior Springs Par 3 Golf Course (NLE), Excelsior Springs, Missouri, 1947
- Grandview Municipal Golf Course, Springfield, Missouri, 1947
- Oakwood Country Club, Enid, Oklahoma, 1947–48
- Lawton Country Club, Lawton, Oklahoma, 1948
- Kentucky Dam Village, Kentucky Dam Village, Kentucky, 1948
- Camp Hood Golf Course (NLE), Camp Hood, Texas, 1948
- Randolph Oaks Golf Course, Randolph AFB, Texas, 1948
- F. E. Warren AFB Golf Course, Cheyenne, Wyoming, 1948
- Bayou DeSiard Country Club, Monroe, Louisiana, 1949
- Palmetto Country Club (NLE), Benton, Louisiana, 1950
- University of Oklahoma Golf Course, Norman, Oklahoma, 1950
- Oak Cliff Country Club, Dallas, Texas, 1951
- River Hills Golf Club (NLE), Irving, Texas, 1951
- Lake Hefner Golf Course, Oklahoma City, Oklahoma, 1951

=== Renovations by Perry Maxwell ===
- Lincoln Park Golf Course (green renovation), Oklahoma City, Oklahoma, 1926
- Philadelphia Country Club (one hole and greens), Philadelphia, Pennsylvania, 1933
- Pine Valley Golf Club (three holes), Clementon, New Jersey, 1933
- Sunnybrook Golf Club (greens), Flourtown, Pennsylvania, 1934
- Gulph Mills Country Club (five holes), King of Prussia, Pennsylvania, 1934–38
- The National Golf Links of America (unknown), Southampton, New York, 1935
- Dornick Hills Golf & Country Club (three holes), Ardmore, Oklahoma, 1936
- Links Golf Club (greens), Long Island, New York, 1936
- Oaks Country Club (six holes), Tulsa, Oklahoma, 1936
- Augusta National Golf Club (11 holes), Augusta, Georgia, 1937–38
- North Fulton Golf Course (up to four holes), Atlanta, Georgia 1937
- Merion Golf Club (greens), Ardmore, Pennsylvania, 1938
- Hillandale Country Club (green renovation), Hillandale, North Carolina, 1938
- Huntington Crescent Club (unknown), Long Island, New York, 1939
- Rockaway Hunting Club (unknown), Long Island, New York, 1939
- Maidstone Golf Club (renovation plan), Long Island, New York, 1939
- Westchester Country Club (multiple holes), Westchester, New York, 1939
- Twin Hills Golf & Country Club (greens), Oklahoma City, Oklahoma, 1939
- Colonial Country Club, Fort Worth, Texas, 1940
- Brook Hollow Country Club (greens), Dallas, Texas, 1940
- Hope Valley Country Club (all greens), Durham, North Carolina, 1940
- Clearwater Country Club (all greens, four holes), Clearwater, Florida, 1940–45
- Saucon Valley Country Club (two holes), Bethlehem, Pennsylvania, 1944
- Salina Country Club (four holes), Salina, Kansas, 1945
- Lincoln Homestead Park Golf Course (greens), Springfield, Kentucky, 1948
- Omaha Country Club (several holes), Omaha, Nebraska, 1951

== See also ==
- List of golf course architects
