= Roland Park, Baltimore =

- Roland Park Historic District
- U.S. National Register of Historic Places
- U.S. Historic district
- Interactive map of Roland Park Historic District
- Location: Irregular pattern between Belvedere Ave., Falls Rd., 39th St., and Stoney Run, Baltimore, Maryland
- Coordinates: 39°20′57″N 76°38′05″W
- Area: 700 acres (280 ha)
- Built: 1890
- Architect: Olmsted, Frederick Law; Et al.
- Architectural style: Late 19th And 20th Century Revivals, Late Victorian
- NRHP reference No.: 74002213
- Added to NRHP: December 23, 1974

Roland Park is a community in Baltimore, Maryland. It was developed between 1890 and 1920 as an upper-class streetcar suburb. The early phases of the neighborhood were designed by Edward Bouton and Frederick Law Olmsted Jr.

== History ==
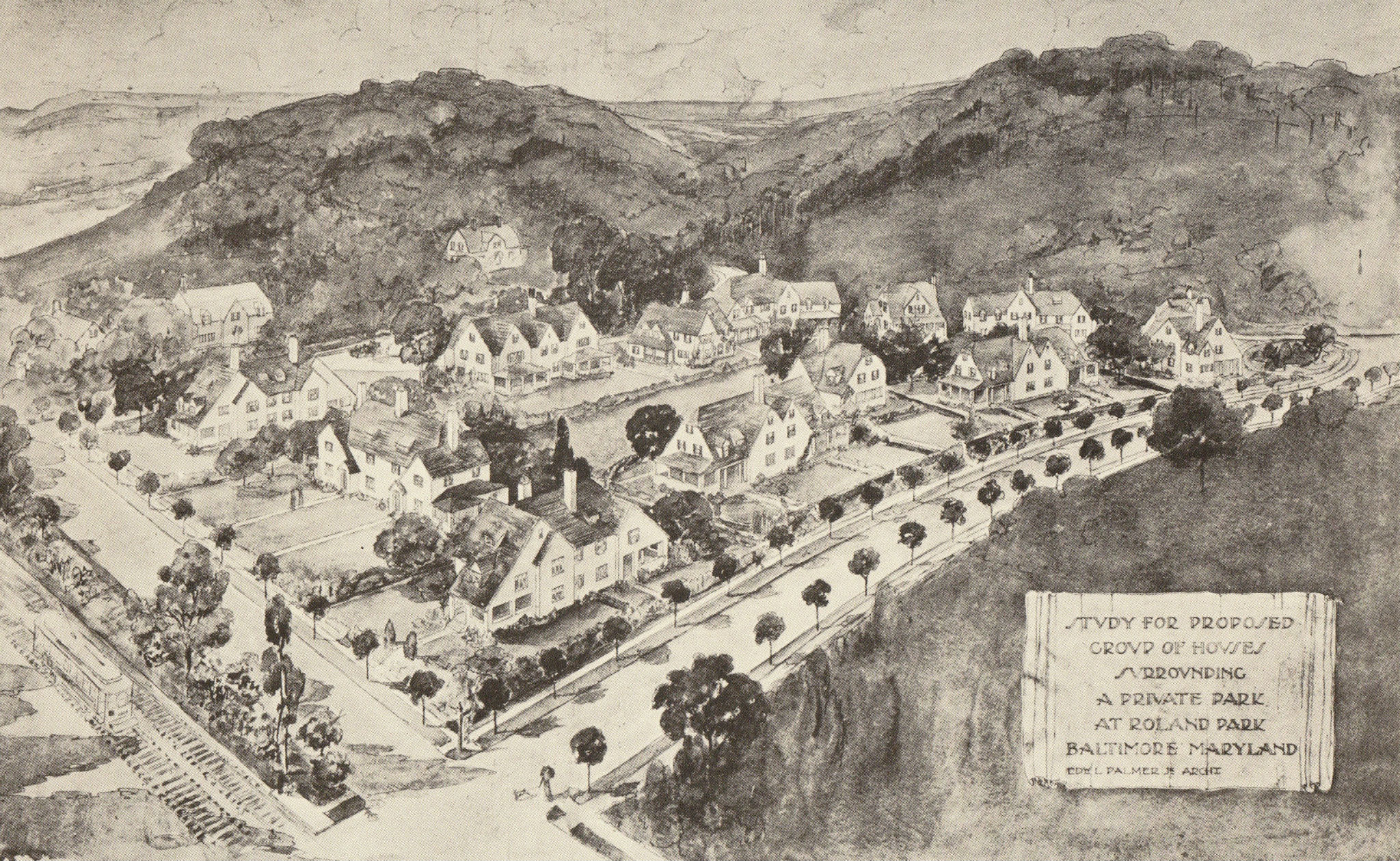
Roland Park plan

Jarvis and Conklin, a Chicago investment firm, purchased 500 acres (200 ha) of land near Lake Roland in 1891 and founded the Roland Park Company with $1 million in capital. Not long after, the Panic of 1893 forced Jarvis and Conklin to sell the Roland Park Company to the firm of Stewart and Young. Despite the dire economics after 1893, Stewart and Young continued investment in the development.

The Roland Park Company hired Kansas City developer Edward H. Bouton as the general manager and George Edward Kessler to lay out the lots for the first tract. They hired the Olmsted Brothers to lay out the second tract, and installed expensive infrastructure, including graded-streets, gutters, sidewalks, and constructed the Lake Roland Elevated Railroad. The company consulted George E Waring Jr. to advise them on the installation of a sewer system. Bouton placed restrictive covenants on all lots in Roland Park. These included setback requirements and proscriptions against any business operations.

It was a modern development, electricity for lighting throughout the neighborhood as well as gas for cooking and lighting. Water came from artesian wells dug up to 500 feet (150 m), nearly 50,000 feet (15,000 m) of water mains were constructed, in addition to 50,000 feet (15,000 m) of roadways, and 100,000 feet (30,000 m) of sidewalks.

Bouton and some Baltimore investors purchased the interests of Roland Park and reorganized the company in 1903.

Frederick Law Olmsted Jr. cited Roland Park as a model residential subdivision to his Harvard School of Design students. Duncan McDuffie, developer of St. Francis Wood in San Francisco, called Roland Park "an ideal residential district." Jesse Clyde Nichols had found inspiration in Roland Park when he was planning the Country Club District of Kansas City. Nichols continued to refer to Roland Park as an ideal residential development when he counselled other residential developers. The park-like setting designed by the Olmsted brothers was a mark of affluence echoed by other neighborhoods in Baltimore such as Mayfield and Guilford.

== Deed restrictions and further implications ==
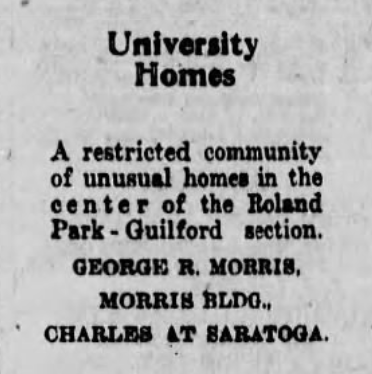
A June 25, 1921 advertisement in the Baltimore Sun for racially restricted houses sold by George R. Morris.

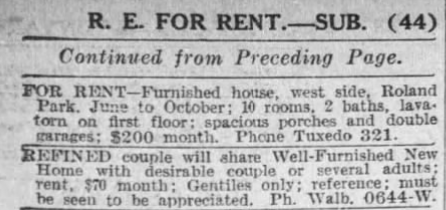
A May 7, 1922 advertisement in the Baltimore Sun for "Gentiles only" housing in Roland Park.

In the late 1800s and early 1900s, Baltimore saw an influx of immigrants, nearing 600,000. Bouton took 100 acres of land a few miles north of Downtown Baltimore and sold it as an exclusive, lush “garden suburb”, free of city grime and racial diversity.

Letters from the time show that Bouton asked a law firm, Schmuker & Whitelock, if he could legally restrict who bought property in Roland Park. Though the firm advised against it, by 1912, the ‘Nuisances’ section of the deed read, “At no time shall the land included in said tract or any part thereof, or any building erected thereon, be occupied by any negro or person of negro extraction. This prohibition, however, is not intended to include occupancy by a negro domestic servant.”

Additionally, Bouton claimed that he did not sell to Jews, as they were “undesirable”, at the 1914 Annual Conference of the Development of High-Class Residential Property, further demonstrating the levels of exclusion in the emerging city suburbs.

In 1911, George Ford, a professor at Columbia University and later the president of the National Conference on City Planning, was starting to teach a course on urban planning and reached out to Bouton as he was impressed with his racial restrictions. Employees of the Roland Park Company would later go on to serve on national boards, such as the Federal Housing Administration, which helped normalize and standardize the practice of redlining throughout the country.

Though the Supreme Court ruled against the enforceability of racially restrictive deeds in 1948, segregation and redlining remained prevalent in Roland Park and throughout other areas of Baltimore City through the 1950s and up until today. In the early 1940s and ‘50s, Baltimore City and the federal government undertook housing development projects displacing African-American populations into inner-city, high-rise buildings that were, essentially, created to reinforce the patterns of neighborhood segregation that emerged in the late 1800s. On this matter, the government stated the project was “not [for] slum clearance but rather using the projects to block the Negro from encroaching upon white territory”.

The real estate developer James W. Rouse used antisemitic quotas when building in Roland Park. In 1951, Rouse enforced a quota of no more than 12% Jewish residents for the Maryland Apartment in north Baltimore until 75% of the apartments were rented.

== Roland Park Shopping Center ==
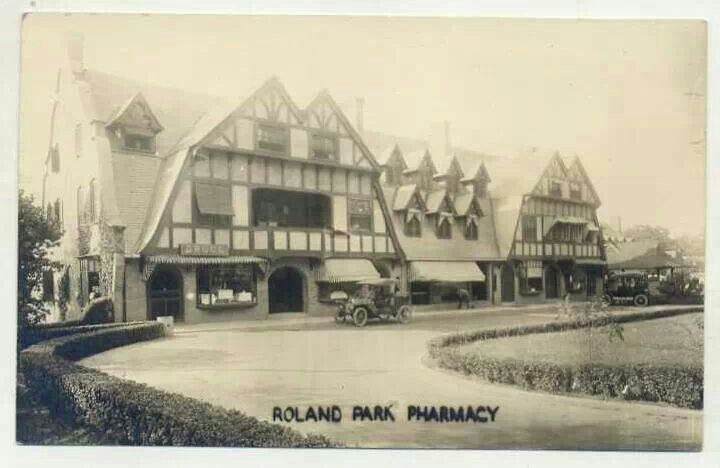
Roland Park Shopping Center 1907 or shortly thereafter

Roland Park Shopping Center (originally Roland Park Business Block) was built at the corner of Upland Road and Roland Avenue in 1896 in the English Tudor style. Developed by Roland Park Company President Edward Bouton and designed by Wyatt and Nolting, it was originally planned as an apartment and office building with a “community room” for civic functions on the upper level.

It opened in 1907 as shops. It has been credited by Guinness World Records as the world's first shopping center (though some editions of Guinness incorrectly date it to 1896, when it was not yet a shopping center). Since it had only six stores, qualifying today as a strip mall, other, larger centers have received more recognition as “firsts”, such as Market Square in Lake Forest, Illinois (1916, the first uniformly planned neighborhood shopping center) and the Country Club Plaza (1923) in Kansas City, Missouri, the first uniformly-planned regional shopping center.

== Education ==
The neighborhood is within the bounds of Baltimore City Public Schools and is assigned to Roland Park Elementary/Middle School, a K-8 school that earned the Blue Ribbon for Academic Excellence from the state department of education in 1997 and 1998.

There are several private schools in the neighborhood: Friends School of Baltimore, Gilman School, Roland Park Country School, the Bryn Mawr School, Cathedral School, and Boys' Latin School of Maryland. In addition, St. Mary's Seminary and University is located in Roland Park.

There is also a branch of the Enoch Pratt Free Library in Roland Park.

== Transportation ==
The Baltimore Light Rail's Cold Spring Lane Station is to the west, within walking distance of much of the neighborhood, just across Falls Road and running alongside the Jones Falls Expressway.

== Notable buildings ==
- Baltimore Country Club
- Maryland State Society Chapter House
