= Indian Hills Country Club =

- Location within Kansas
- 39°00′17″N 94°37′40″W

Club information
- Location: Mission Hills, Kansas
- Established: 1919; 107 years ago
- Type: Private
- Tota holes: 18

Indian Hills Country Club is a private club and golf course in Mission Hills, Kansas.

The club was organized as the Community Golf Club in 1919 by J.C. Nichols on land adjoining Mission Hills Country Club. In 1922 it temporarily moved to land that is now Kansas City Country Club. Membership was open to anybody in the Nichols-developed subdivision of Mission Hills with an annual fee of $30 and $5 for each family member.

In 1925, Kansas City Country Club took over the course and Nichols helped organize Indian Hills Country Club. A.W. Tillinghast designed the course.

The three clubs became the most socially desirable in the Kansas City metropolitan area.

The Nichols strategy to create the three clubs was to make Kansas more attractive to upscale buyers who had previously not wanted to leave Kansas City, Missouri.

The original clubhouse was replaced in 1972. The new clubhouse was renovated from 1997 to 2001 and again in 2009.

The course is an 18-hole, 6,474 yard par 70.
