= Dornick Hills Golf & Country Club =

Golf course in Ardmore, Oklahoma

- Interactive map of Dornick Hills Golf & Country Club
- 34.219°N 97.139°W

Club information
- Location: 519 Country Club Road; Ardmore, Oklahoma; United States
- Established: 1913
- Type: Private
- Tota holes: 18
- Website: Dornick Hills Golf & CC
- Designed by: Perry Maxwell
- Par: 70
- Length: 6,453 yd (5,901 m) Longest hole is #6 -556 yd (508 m)
- Course rating: 71.7
- Slope rating: 126

Dornick Hills Golf & Country Club is located in Ardmore, Oklahoma. The golf course, designed and built by noted golf course architect Perry Maxwell, hosted the 1952–1954 Ardmore Open as well as the 1954 LPGA Ardmore Open.

== History of Dornick Hills ==
The Dornick Hills Golf Course was named from the Gaelic word "Dornick" meaning "small rocks". Thousands of these rocks had to be removed before the course could be built. There are still several outcroppings of the natural rock formations on the golf course, including the cliff at the signature "Cliff Hole". Course architect Perry Maxwell is buried in the family cemetery on the ridge north of the 7th fairway.

Maxwell is credited with many of the great layouts in Oklahoma and throughout the United States. In 1913, on the site of a former dairy farm that he owned, Maxwell built the first nine holes of Dornick Hills. The remaining nine holes would not be completed until 1923. Maxwell was inducted into the Oklahoma Sports Hall of Fame. He came to be known as the "father of Oklahoma golf". Dornick Hills enjoys two distinctions, one being that it was Oklahoma's first golf course with Bermuda grass greens. It was also the first Oklahoma golf club to be affiliated with the United States Golf Association (USGA), which occurred on July 20, 1914. For the next six years no other Oklahoma golf club had a USGA affiliation.

== Signature hole at Dornick Hills ==
Maxwell built a green atop a 50-foot cliff on the 16th hole, a signature hole known as the "Cliff Hole", at Dornick Hills to make a demanding approach shot on the par 5 hole. Long hitters can risk a wood or long iron shot to the elevated green but most players have no choice but to lay up below the cliff for a short iron approach to the green. On the next hole, golfers tee off from the cliff summit and play sharply downward to a par 3 green below.
