= Prairie Dunes Country Club =

Golf course in Kansas, US

- Location of Prairie Dunes Country Club Prairie Dunes Country Club (the United States)
- 38.091°N 97.848°W

Club information
- Location: Hutchinson, Kansas
- Established: 1937
- Type: Private
- Total holes: 18
- Website: www.prairiedunes.com
- Designed by: Perry Maxwell
- Par: 70
- Length: 6,759 yards (6,180 m)
- Course rating: 75.5
- Slope rating: 148

Prairie Dunes Country Club is a golf course located just outside Hutchinson, Kansas. Frequently ranked among the best golf courses in the United States, it has hosted several United States Golf Association national championship tournaments.

The club was founded by Emerson Carey and his four sons in the mid-1930s. The course was funded and constructed, at least in part, by the Works Progress Administration under the New Deal. The course was designed by Perry Maxwell, and the first nine holes opened on September 13, 1937. Twenty years later in 1957, a second 9 holes were opened, designed by Press Maxwell (Perry's son).

== Events ==
- Trans-Mississippi Amateur: 1958, 1973, 1987, 1996, 2005, 2017
- U.S. Women's Amateur: 1964, 1980, 1991
- Curtis Cup Match: 1986
- U.S. Mid-Amateur: 1988
- U.S. Senior Amateur: 1995
- U.S. Women's Open: 2002
- U.S. Senior Open: 2006
- NCAA Division I Men's Golf Championships: 2014
- Big 12 Conference Men's Golf Championship: 1997–2002, 2007, 2009, 2011, 2013, 2017, 2021, 2023, 2026
- Kansas Amateur : 1962, 1967, 1976, 1984, 1993, 2010

== Honors ==
- Golfweek 2008 - #9 of America's Best Classical Golf Courses
- Golf Digest 2018/19 - #27 of America's Greatest Golf Courses
- Golf Magazine 2017 - #18 in the United States & #25 in the World
- Golf Digest 2001 - #2, #8 & #10 among the Best 99 Holes in the U.S.
- Audubon International - Obtained certification in the Audubon Cooperative Sanctuary Program for Golf Courses program
