= Twin Hills Golf & Country Club =

- Location in the United States
- 35.51145°N 97.45498°W

Club information
- Location: Oklahoma City, Oklahoma; United States
- Established: 1923
- Type: Private
- Tota holes: 18
- Tournaments: 1935 PGA Championship
- Designed by: Perry Maxwell
- Par: 72
- Length: 6,857 yd (6,270 m) Longest hole is #2 - 583 yd (533 m)
- Course rating: 74.2
- Slope rating: 133

Twin Hills Golf & Country Club is a country club located in an unincorporated part of Oklahoma County that borders Forest Park and Oklahoma City, Oklahoma. The golf course hosted the PGA Championship in 1935. Johnny Revolta won the tournament beating Tommy Armour 5 and 4.

== History of the course ==
The history of Twin Hills dates back to 1920 when five oilmen (Al Maidt, Bob Conliff, Gus Mattison, Leslie Norris, and Bill Buchholz) commissioned Perry Maxwell to design and build the course on its present 160-acre site. Soon after completing the course, these founders sold the course to the Dorset Carter family. It is believed that Dorset Carter purchased the club in 1921 for his son, Keefe Carter. Keefe was an accomplished golfer, winning the prestigious Western Open in 1925.

The official founding date of Twin Hills came in 1923. This date coincides with the date the clubhouse was completed, and the Club was officially incorporated as member-owned in 1946. Twin Hills has hosted several prestigious tournaments over the years including the Western Amateur, PGA Championship, Western Junior Open, Oklahoma City Open, U.S. Junior Amateur, NAIA National Championship and has hosted some of the world’s greatest golfers—Johnny Revolta, Arnold Palmer, Gene Sarazen, Gene Littler, and many more.

== Scorecard ==
Tee	Rating/Slope	1	2	3	4	5	6	7	8	9	Out	10	11	12	13	14	15	16	17	18	In	Total
Blue	74.2/133	403	583	356	143	496	367	233	427	393	3401	280	183	407	550	206	410	567	403	450	3456	6857
White	72.3/130	386	570	345	138	480	350	193	397	373	3232	273	160	373	530	187	377	547	373	423	3243	6475
Red	75.0/140	350	431	310	125	437	333	163	405	350	2904	263	126	309	405	148	345	470	287	402	2754	5658
Par	Par	4	5	4	3	5	4	3	4	4	36	4	3	4	5	3	4	5	4	4	36	72
SI	Men's	5	3	11	17	13	15	9	1	7		18	14	4	16	10	6	12	8	2
Par	Par	4	5	4	3	5	4	3	5	4	37	4	3	4	5	3	4	5	4	5	37	74
SI	Women's	3	15	5	17	1	9	11	13	7		16	16	2	12	6	4	8	18	10

== Tournaments hosted ==
- 1930 Oklahoma Open
- 1934 Western Amateur
- 1932 Oklahoma Open
- 1935 PGA Championship
- 1955 Women's Trans-National
- 1957 Oklahoma Open
- 1959 Oklahoma City Open
- 1960 Oklahoma City Open
- 1961 Trans-Mississippi Amateur
- 1967 U.S. Junior Amateur
- 1968 National Team Championship
- 1976 Oklahoma Open
- 1977 Oklahoma Open
