= Mission Hills, Kansas =

- City
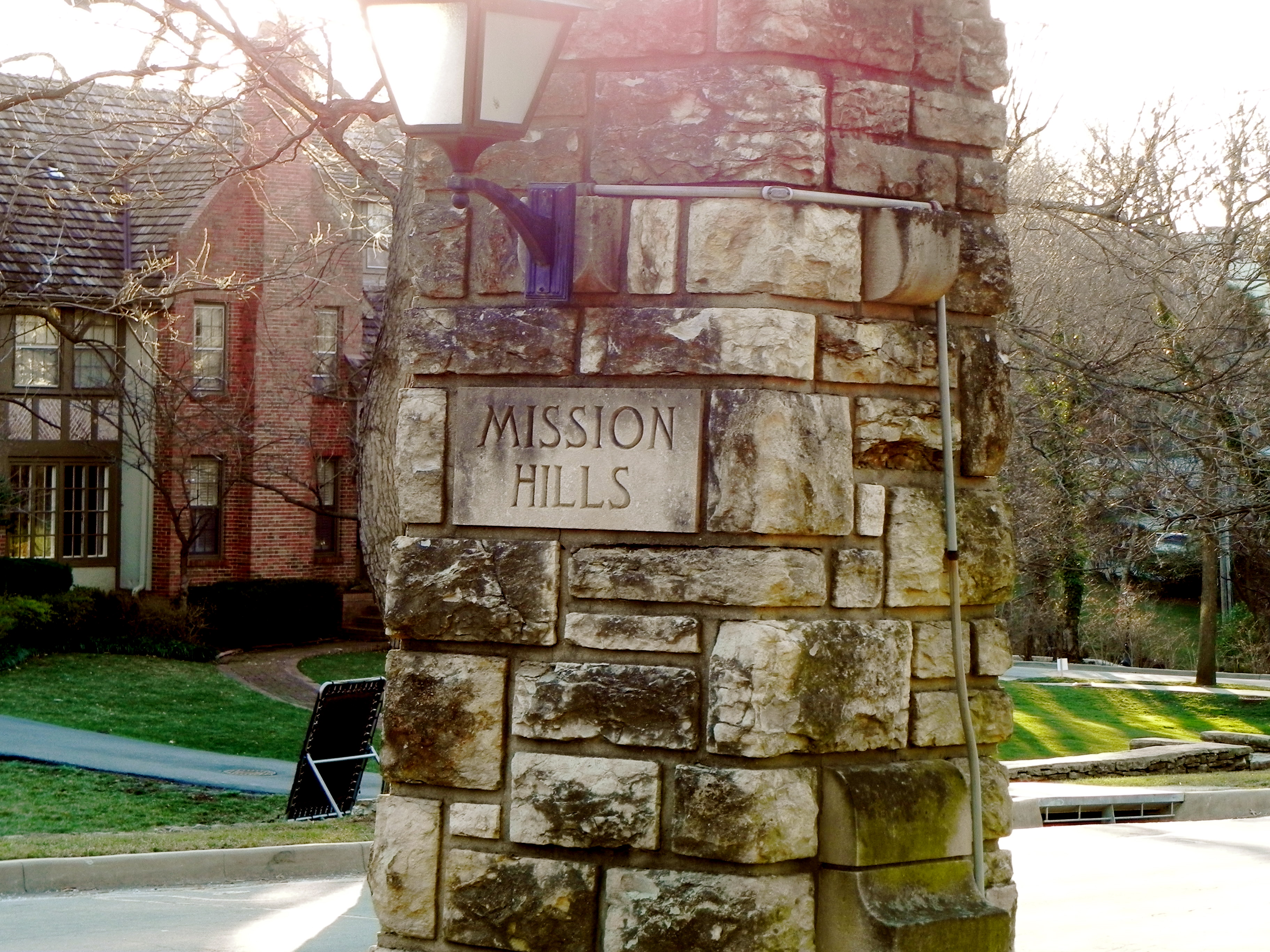
- City Sign at corner of 56th Street and State Line Road

- Location within Johnson County and Kansas
- Interactive map of Mission Hills, Kansas
- Coordinates: 39°00′30″N 94°37′39″W
- Country: United States
- State: Kansas
- County: Johnson
- Incorporated: 1949

Area
  - Total: 2.04 sq mi (5.28 km^{2})
  - Land: 2.04 sq mi (5.28 km^{2})
  - Water: 0 sq mi (0.00 km^{2})
- Elevation: 958 ft (292 m)

Population (2020)
  - Total: 3,594
  - Density: 1,760/sq mi (681/km^{2})
- Time zone: UTC-6 (CST)
  - Summer (DST): UTC-5 (CDT)
- ZIP Code: 66208
- Area code: 913
- FIPS code: 20-47350
- GNIS ID: 485624
- Website: missionhillsks.gov

Mission Hills is a city in Johnson County, Kansas, United States, and part of the Kansas City Metropolitan Area. As of the 2020 census, the population of the city was 3,594. The east city limits is the Kansas-Missouri state line at State Line Road. Mission Hills was originally developed by noted Kansas City developer J. C. Nichols beginning in the 1920s as part of his Country Club District plan.

== History ==
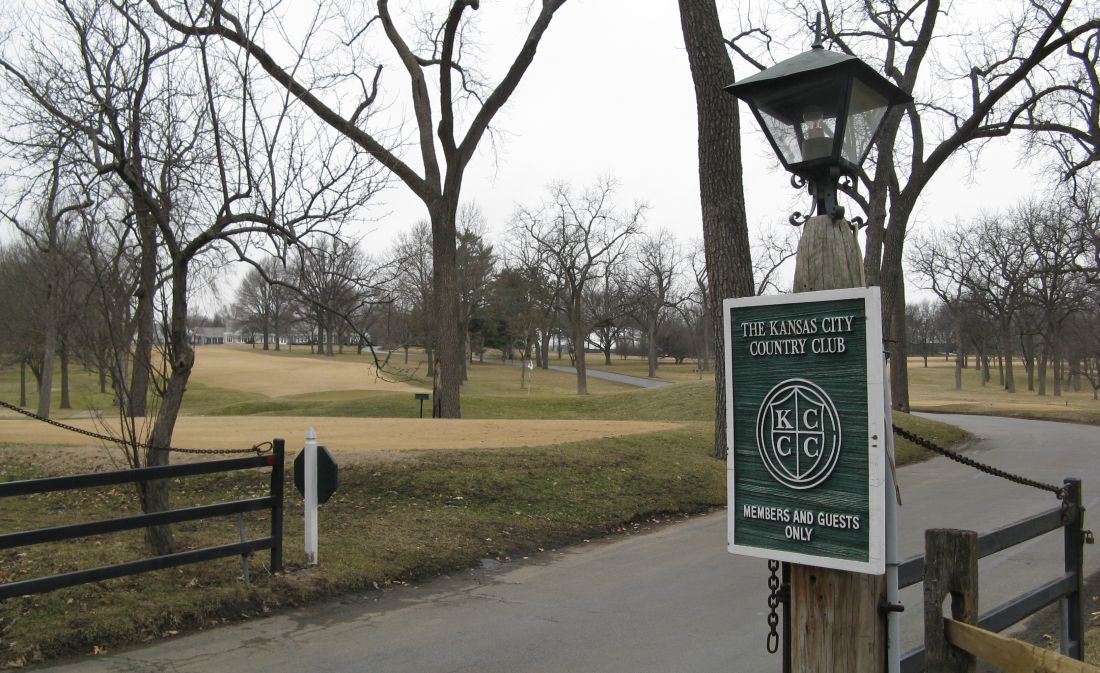
Kansas City Country Club, 2008

An Indian mission was established at the town's site in the 1830s, hence the name of the later settlement.

The city started as a planned upscale community for the elite by J.C. Nichols to be built around the Mission Hills Country Club (Kansas) on the hills above Brush Creek just south of the Shawnee Methodist Mission. Most of the country club's property is in Kansas but its original clubhouse was in Kansas City, Missouri, allowing it to serve liquor, which was prohibited on the Kansas side. Nichols laid out plans in 1914. He had developed the country club to enhance the value of his Kansas properties after discovering that upscale buyers were reluctant to live on the Kansas side of the state line.

Adjoining the club Nichols established the Community Golf Club. After it dramatically grew, it moved to what today is the Kansas City Country Club. Nichols lured the Kansas City Country Club to take over the land, and the Community Golf Club went on to establish the Indian Hills Country Club. Together, the three clubs became the most prestigious in the Kansas City metropolitan area; many rank them in order of prestige: Kansas City first, Mission Hills second, and Indian Hills third.

Nichols opposed incorporation of the community fearing that a city would not adequately meet the needs of its residents or properly enforce housing covenants. Consequently, the Mission Hills Home Company was founded on August 18, 1914. One of the most publicized early enforcements involved forbidding the family of a sick woman to enclose her porch with glass.

Faced with prospects of annexation by neighboring relatively lower income communities seeking its wealthy tax base, Mission Hills incorporated as a city in 1949.

Many of the early houses were designed by Clarence E. Shepherd, Edward Tanner, and Edward Buehler Delk.

The city's most distinctive landmark, which is used on the official city seal, is the Verona columns and reflecting pool at the intersection of Ensley Lane, Mission Drive and Overhill Road. They were conceived by landscape architect S. Herbert Hare in 1924.

In 1928 Ernest Hemingway and his wife, Pauline, stayed at the house of W. Malcolm and Ruth Lowry at 6435 Indian Lane. During this time, Hemingway was working on A Farewell to Arms. He later gave an autographed copy of the book to Don Carlos Guffey, the Kansas City doctor who delivered his son Patrick. The inscription, which is now in the University of Missouri-Kansas City library, said "...with much admiration and grateful remembrance of a Caesarean that was beautifully done and turned out splendidly."

They returned for a time in 1931 while Hemingway was working on Death in the Afternoon.

== Geography ==
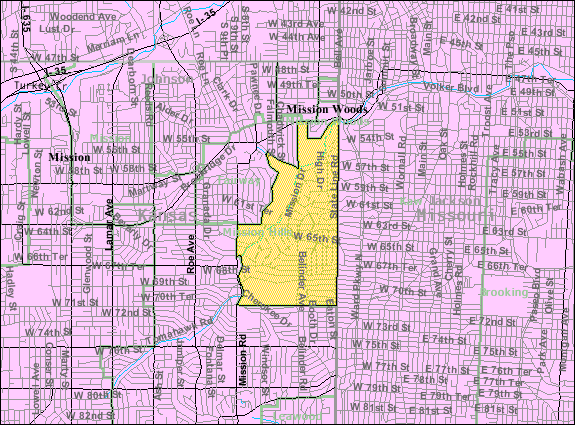
Detailed map of Mission Hills

According to the United States Census Bureau, the city has a total area of 2.02 square miles (5.23 km^{2}), all land. However, Brush Creek flows through the northern section of the city.

The northern half of Mission Hills, north of 63rd Street, is informally called "old Mission Hills" and is dominated by opulent houses on large lots. There are two private country clubs in this section: the Mission Hills Country Club and the Kansas City Country Club. The southern half, consisting of developments Belinder Hills, Indian Hills and Sagamore Hills, contains affluent upper middle class residences and the private Indian Hills Country Club.

== Demographics ==
Historical population
Census	Pop.	Note	%±
1950	1,275		—
1960	3,621		184.0%
1970	4,198		15.9%
1980	3,904		−7.0%
1990	3,446		−11.7%
2000	3,593		4.3%
2010	3,498		−2.6%
2020	3,594		2.7%
U.S. Decennial Census

According to Forbes Magazine, Mission Hills ranks as the third wealthiest municipality in the country. Mission Hills has the highest median household income of any city in Kansas with a population over 1,000, as well as one of the highest median incomes for any city in the United States.

=== Racial and ethnic composition ===
Mission Hills city, Kansas – Racial and ethnic composition Note: the US Census treats Hispanic/Latino as an ethnic category. This table excludes Latinos from the racial categories and assigns them to a separate category. Hispanics/Latinos may be of any race.
Race / Ethnicity (NH = Non-Hispanic)	Pop 2000	Pop 2010	Pop 2020	% 2000	% 2010	% 2020
White alone (NH)	3,500	3,332	3,236	97.41%	95.25%	90.04%
Black or African American alone (NH)	3	6	4	0.08%	0.17%	0.11%
Native American or Alaska Native alone (NH)	1	8	3	0.03%	0.23%	0.08%
Asian alone (NH)	31	48	113	0.86%	1.37%	3.14%
Native Hawaiian or Pacific Islander alone (NH)	0	0	1	0.00%	0.00%	0.03%
Other race alone (NH)	0	3	3	0.00%	0.09%	0.08%
Mixed race or Multiracial (NH)	19	37	138	0.53%	1.06%	3.84%
Hispanic or Latino (any race)	39	64	96	1.09%	1.83%	2.67%
Total	3,593	3,498	3,594	100.00%	100.00%	100.00%

=== 2020 census ===
As of the 2020 census, Mission Hills had a population of 3,594, with 1,241 households and 1,094 families. The population density was 1,764.4 per square mile (681.2/km^{2}), and there were 1,307 housing units at an average density of 641.6 per square mile (247.7/km^{2}).

The median age was 45.0 years. 26.3% of residents were under the age of 18, 7.8% were from 18 to 24, 15.9% were from 25 to 44, 28.9% were from 45 to 64, and 21.1% were 65 years of age or older. For every 100 females, there were 98.2 males, and for every 100 females age 18 and over, there were 97.4 males age 18 and over.

100.0% of residents lived in urban areas, while 0.0% lived in rural areas.

Of households, 39.9% had children under the age of 18 living in them. Of all households, 82.0% were married-couple households, 5.6% were households with a male householder and no spouse or partner present, and 11.1% were households with a female householder and no spouse or partner present. About 10.8% of all households were made up of individuals, and 7.1% had someone living alone who was 65 years of age or older.

Of housing units, 5.0% were vacant. The homeowner vacancy rate was 2.1% and the rental vacancy rate was 0.0%.

Racial composition as of the 2020 census
Race	Number	Percent
White	3,272	91.0%
Black or African American	5	0.1%
American Indian and Alaska Native	3	0.1%
Asian	113	3.1%
Native Hawaiian and Other Pacific Islander	1	0.0%
Some other race	14	0.4%
Two or more races	186	5.2%

The non-Hispanic white population was 90.04%.

=== Demographic estimates ===
The average household size was 2.7 and the average family size was 3.0.

The percent of those with a bachelor's degree or higher was estimated to be 64.6% of the population.

=== Income and poverty ===
The 2016–2020 5-year American Community Survey estimates show that the median household income was $250,000+ and the median family income was $250,000+. Males had a median income of $202,292 (+/- $76,309) versus $47,102 (+/- $25,093) for females. The median income for those above 16 years old was $113,913 (+/- $25,942). Approximately, 0.0% of families and 0.2% of the population were below the poverty line, including 0.0% of those under the age of 18 and 0.0% of those ages 65 or over.

=== 2010 census ===
At the 2010 census there were 3,498 people in 1,253 households, including 1,066 families, in the city. The population density was 1,731.7 inhabitants per square mile (668.6/km^{2}). There were 1,326 housing units at an average density of 656.4 per square mile (253.4/km^{2}). The racial makup of the city was 96.8% White, 0.2% African American, 0.2% Native American, 1.5% Asian, 0.2% from other races, and 1.1% from two or more races. Hispanic or Latino of any race were 1.8%.

Of the 1,253 households 37.0% had children under the age of 18 living with them, 79.7% were married couples living together, 3.8% had a female householder with no husband present, 1.6% had a male householder with no wife present, and 14.9% were non-families. 12.9% of households were one person and 8% were one person aged 65 or older. The average household size was 2.79 and the average family size was 3.07.

The median age was 47.1 years. 28.4% of residents were under the age of 18; 4% were between the ages of 18 and 24; 14.3% were from 25 to 44; 35% were from 45 to 64; and 18.1% were 65 or older. The gender makeup of the city was 48.6% male and 51.4% female.

== Education ==
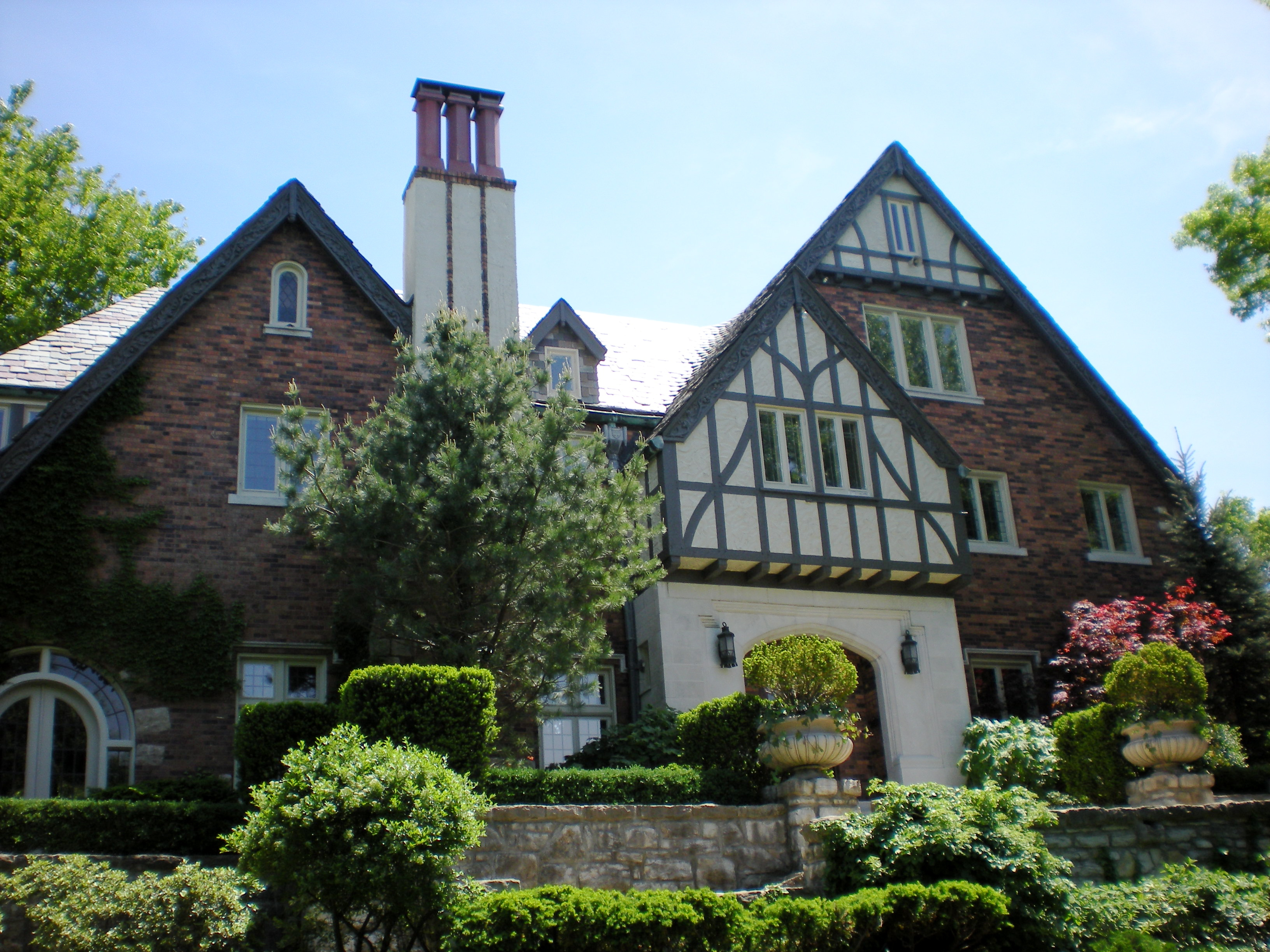
Typical residence in Mission Hills, Kansas, 2008

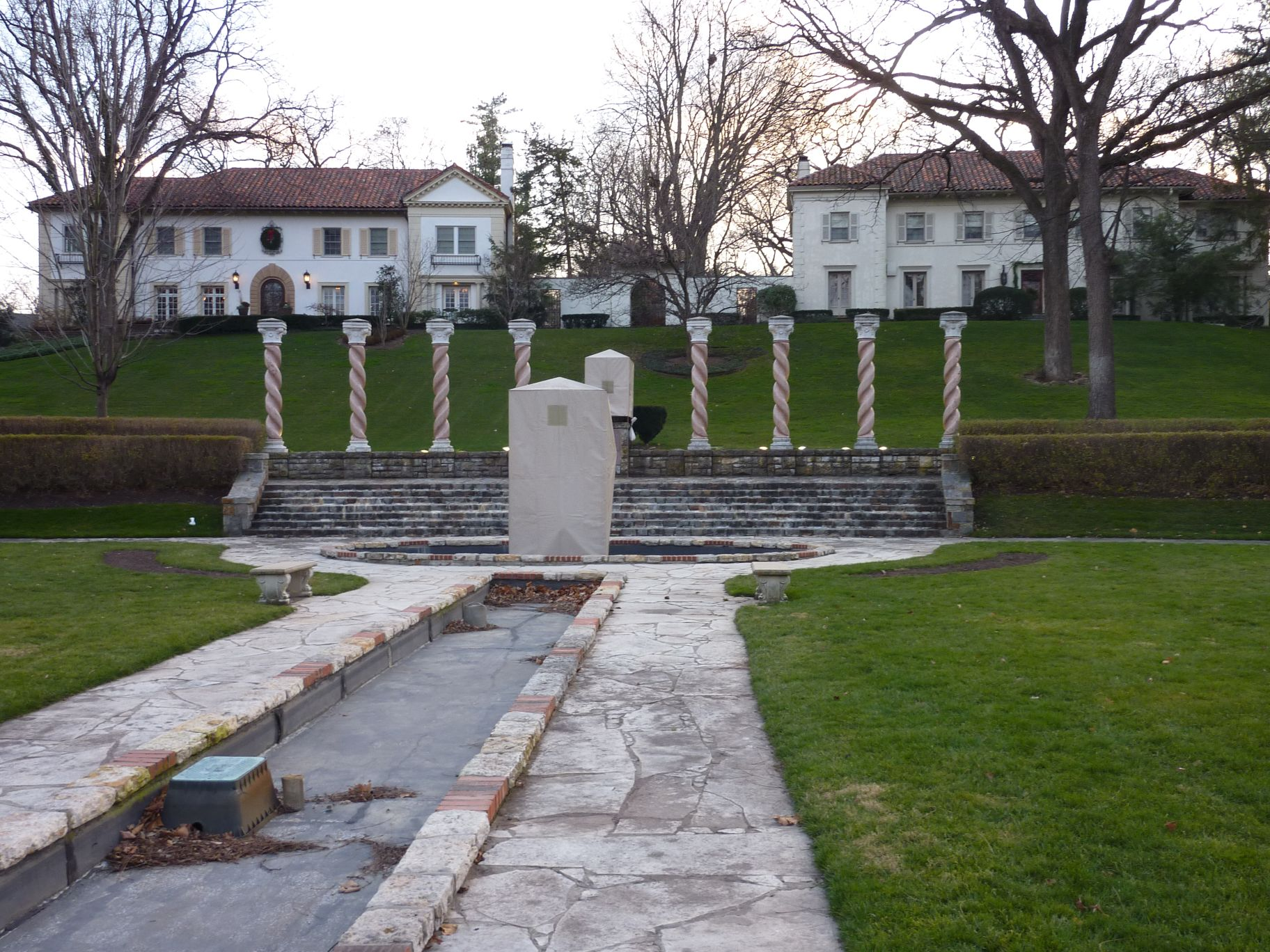
Verona Columns, 2009

Mission Hills is in the Shawnee Mission public school district. Some families send their children to one of the many secular private schools in the city like the Pembroke Hill School and The Barstow School or to religiously affiliated schools such as Bishop Miege High School or Rockhurst High School.

== Libraries ==
The Johnson County Library serves the residents of Mission Hills.

== In the media ==
Mission Hills is a setting for the ABC Family television drama Switched at Birth. The show is set in Kansas City, Missouri, but the main characters live in Mission Hills.

Mission Hills was ranked number 3 on the Forbes list of America's most affluent neighborhoods.

== Notable people ==
Notable individuals who were born in and/or have lived in Mission Hills include:

- Henry W. Bloch (1922–2019), Co-founder H&R Block
- Barbara Bollier (1958- ), Kansas state legislator
- George Brett (1953- ), Baseball Hall of Fame third baseman
- Marcelo Claure (1970- ), telecommunications executive
- David Dreier (1952- ), member of Congress, chairman of the House Rules Committee, chairman of Tribune Publishing
- James Ellroy (1948- ), novelist
- Thomas Frank (1965- ), historian, journalist
- Matt Gogel (1971- ), pro golfer, sportscaster
- Donald J. Hall, Sr. (1928–2024), greeting cards executive
- Kevin Harlan (1960- ), sportscaster
- Ewing Kauffman (1916–1993), pharmaceutical entrepreneur
- Tom Watson (1949- ), pro golfer
- Carrie Westcott (1969- ), model, actress
- Cheryl Womack (1950- ), trucking entrepreneur, executive
- David Wysong (1949- ), Kansas state legislator
