= Omaha Country Club =

Country club in Omaha, Nebraska

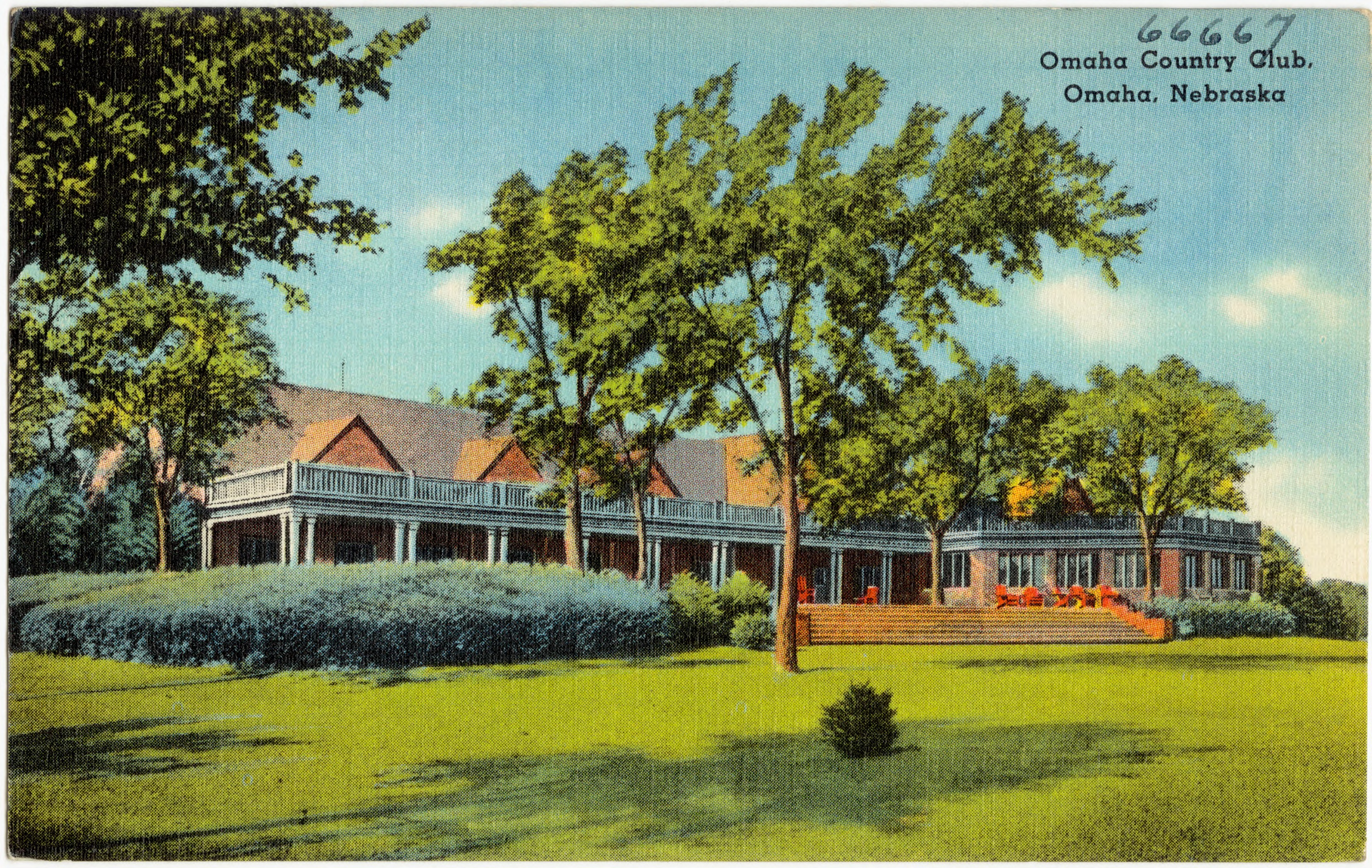
- Omaha Country Club, Omaha, Nebraska

- Location in the United States
- 41.33°N 96.018°W

Club information
- Location: 6900 Country Club Rd. Omaha, Nebraska
- Established: 1927
- Type: Private
- Tota holes: 18
- Tournaments: U.S. Senior Open: (2013, 2021)
- Website: omahacc.org
- Designed by: Wayne Stiles; 1951 renovation: Perry Maxwell
- Par: 71
- Length: 6,973 yards (6,376 m)
- Course rating: 74.6
- Slope rating: 136

Omaha Country Club is a private country club in Omaha, Nebraska, located in the northern area of the city.

== History ==
The Omaha Country Club was founded on September 30, 1889, in what is today’s Country Club Historic District. With articles of incorporation filed June 18, 1900, the owners were noted as WH McCord, Arthur P. Guiou, Chas. T. Kountze and 97 others.

The original 160 acres of land were granted to Albert Steuart in pursuance of the March 3, 1855, Act of Congress, Statute 701, “Bounty Lands for Officers and Soldiers”, entitling bounty land to certain officers and soldiers who had been engaged in the military service of the United States.

A clubhouse was designed by architect Thomas Rogers Kimball in 1900. After the club relocated, elements of the clubhouse were incorporated into the extant house located on the original site at 2320 N 56th Street in Omaha.

February 29, 1924, the Omaha Country Club sold its land to Woods Brothers Silo & Manufacturing Company for $150,000 due to increasing pressure from the advancement of residences in a growing city and moved the course north to its current location.

The golf course was renovated in 1951 by Perry Maxwell. The club hosted the U.S. Senior Open in 2013, won by Kenny Perry and 2021, won by Jim Furyk.
