= Mission Hills Country Club (Kansas) =

American country club

- Location within the United States Location within Kansas
- 39.028902°N 94.61465°W

Club information
- Location: Mission Hills, Kansas, U.S.
- Established: 1914
- Type: Private
- Tota holes: 18
- Website: missionhillscc.com
- Designed by: Tom Bendelow
- Par: 70
- Length: 6,310 yards (5,770 m)
- Course rating: 71.2
- Slope rating: 128

The Mission Hills Country Club (MHCC) is a country club and golf course in the Kansas City-area suburb of Mission Hills, Kansas.

The club, on the banks and hills of Brush Creek, was founded June 30, 1914, largely through the efforts of J. C. Nichols, who was also developing the upscale planned community of Mission Hills. Nichols found that upscale houses were harder to sell in Kansas than in Kansas City, Missouri, so he built the club to attract buyers.

The original club consisted of 121 acres (0.49 km^{2}) in Kansas and 7 acres (28,000 m^{2}) in Missouri, with the clubhouse on the Missouri side because of laxer liquor laws there.

Adjoining the club on the Kansas side Nichols established the Community Golf Club. In 1922 that club moved to what is now Kansas City Country Club. Later, the Community Golf Club became Indian Hills Country Club and moved to its current location.

In the 1950s, the Mission Hills Country Club sold its Missouri clubhouse; the building now houses the Carriage Club.

Kivett and Myers designed the current clubhouse on the Kansas side. In 1967, a ladies card room was added and the men's grill was added in 1973. The building underwent major renovations in 1990 and 2001.

The 18-hole course was originally designed by Tom Bendelow and remodeled for 2007 by golf architect Keith Foster.
