= Country Club Plaza =

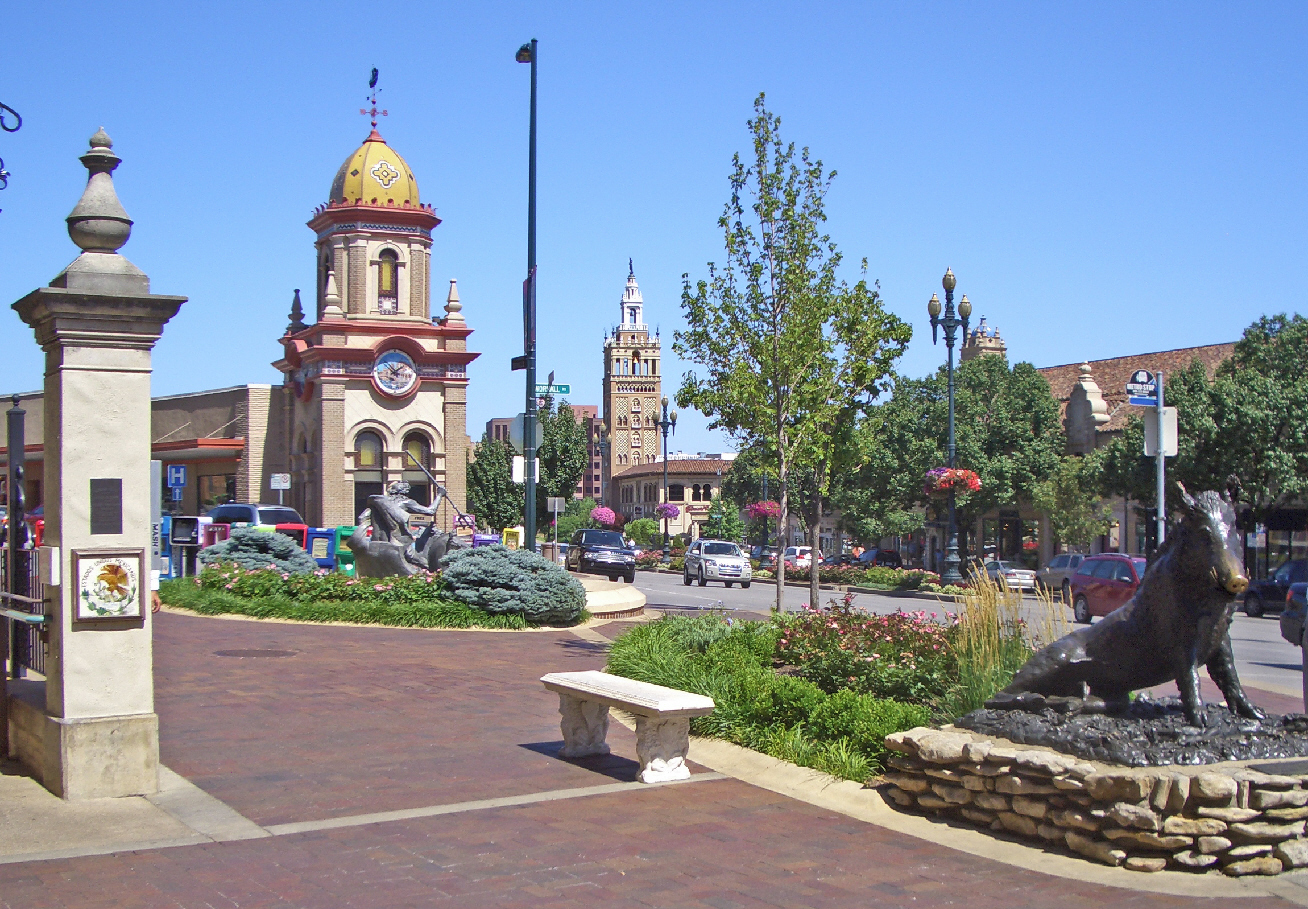
- Kansas City's Country Club Plaza
- Location: Kansas City, Missouri, United States
- Coordinates: 39.041323°N 94.591813°W
- Opened: 1922 (established); 1923 (opened)
- Developer: J.C. Nichols
- Manager: HP Village Management
- Owner: HP Village Management
- Public transit: RideKC
- Website: countryclubplaza.com

The Country Club Plaza (often called The Plaza) is a privately owned regional shopping center in the Country Club District of Kansas City, Missouri. Opened in 1923, it is considered to be the first planned large outdoor suburban shopping center in the United States and among the first regional centers to accommodate shoppers arriving by car.

Planned in 1922 by J. C. Nichols and designed in Baroque Revival and Moorish Revival style echoing the architecture of Seville, Spain, The Plaza comprises numerous, large city blocks of high-end retail establishments, restaurants, and entertainment venues, as well as offices. The Country Club Plaza is named in the Project for Public Spaces' list 60 of the World's Great Places.

It encompasses a 14-block area, and includes 40 statues, fountains and sculptures; 12 towers; carriage rides and sidewalk cafes; and at one time, 180 shops and restaurants.

As of 2020, there were more than 70 stores and shops in 18 separate buildings representing 784,000 square feet (72,800 m^{2}) of retail space and 219,000 square feet (20,300 m^{2}) of office space.

== Location ==
The 55-acre (22 ha) site is about 4 miles (6.4 km) south of downtown, between 46th Street and Brush Creek to the north and south and between Mill Creek Parkway and Madison Avenue to the east and west. The Kansas state line is one mile (1.6 km) to the west. The neighborhoods surrounding the Plaza consist of upscale apartment buildings and mansions, especially those of the Country Club District built along Ward Parkway on the Plaza's southern and southwestern side. The buildings are arrayed along a collection of streets at the northern edge of the Country Club District, which leads the center to blend in with the apartment and office buildings and houses that surround it.

== History ==
Brush Creek on the Plaza at night

The Country Club Plaza was named for the associated Country Club District, the neighborhood developed by J.C. Nichols which surrounded the Kansas City Country Club (now Loose Park). It is situated at the northern terminus of Ward Parkway, a boulevard known for its wide, manicured median lined with fountains and statuary that traverses the Country Club District. Nichols selected the location carefully to provide residents with a direct route to the Plaza along Ward Parkway. Nichols began acquiring the land for the Plaza in 1907, in an area of Kansas City that was then known as Brush Creek Valley. When his plans were first announced, the project was dubbed 'Nichols' Folly' because of the then seemingly undesirable location; at the time, the only developed land in the valley belonged to the Country Day School (now the Pembroke Hill School), and the rest was known for pig farming.. Nichols employed architect Edward Buehler Delk to design the new shopping district. The Plaza was opened in 1923. It was the first regional shopping center designed with parking for automobile access, the first suburban center with common management and tenant selection, and the first with unified architecture. New Urbanist land developer Andres Duany noted in Community Builder: The Life & Legacy of J.C. Nichols that the Country Club Plaza has had the longest life of any planned shopping center in the history of the world. One of its oldest retailers is the Jack Henry Clothing company, founded in 1931.

While the positive contributions that Nichols made to Kansas City and urban development are undeniable, there is a dark history of how his influence impacted marginalized communities within Kansas City. Nichols is responsible for "redlining" and residential covenants that kept Blacks, Jews, and other marginalized people from purchasing homes and living in the more desirable areas of Kansas City.

For its first four decades, the Plaza combined some higher-end shops, such as Harzfeld's, with a mix of more mid-level retailers such as Sears and Woolworth's, as well such quotidian enterprises as a bowling alley, movie theater, and a grocery store to serve the daily needs of residents of the district.. From around 1970, competition from newer suburban shopping malls led management to reposition the Plaza with luxury hotels such as the Ritz-Carlton Hotel, higher-end restaurants, and upscale retailers including Gucci, Polo Ralph Lauren, FAO Schwarz, Saks Fifth Avenue, Bally, and Swanson's. Today, the Plaza is home to a number of high-end and unique-to-market stores including Tiffany & Co., Michael Kors, Kate Spade New York, Eileen Fisher, Indochino, Free People, Tommy Bahama and Vineyard Vines. On September 12, 1977, a major flood of Brush Creek caused severe damage to the Plaza and resulted in a number of deaths. The flood prompted a vast renovation and revitalization of the area that has allowed it not only to survive but to thrive.

In 1998, the J.C. Nichols Company merged with Raleigh, North Carolina–based real-estate investment trust Highwoods Properties, which now runs the Country Club Plaza.

On February 19, 2013, a large explosion destroyed JJ's Restaurant on the Plaza. Believed to be caused by a gas leak, the blast left at least one person dead and sixteen injured. According to a statement from Missouri Gas Energy, a contractor doing underground work struck a gas line. Witnesses had reported a strong odor of natural gas in the area most of the afternoon. The initial explosion happened shortly after 6 p.m. and led to a four-alarm fire that caused the restaurant's complete destruction as well as damage to surrounding buildings. JJ's returned in November 2014 to a new location, still in the Country Club Plaza area.

In 2016 Highwoods announced plans to sell the retail complex for $660 million to a 50-50 joint venture of Taubman Centers and The Macerich Company.

On February 2, 2018, Nordstrom announced it would be moving from Oak Park Mall in Overland Park, Kansas to a new space on the Country Club Plaza expected to open in fall 2023. The plans were cancelled in 2022.

In July 2024, HP Village Management acquired Country Club Plaza in Kansas City from Macerich and Taubman Centers.

== Layout and use ==
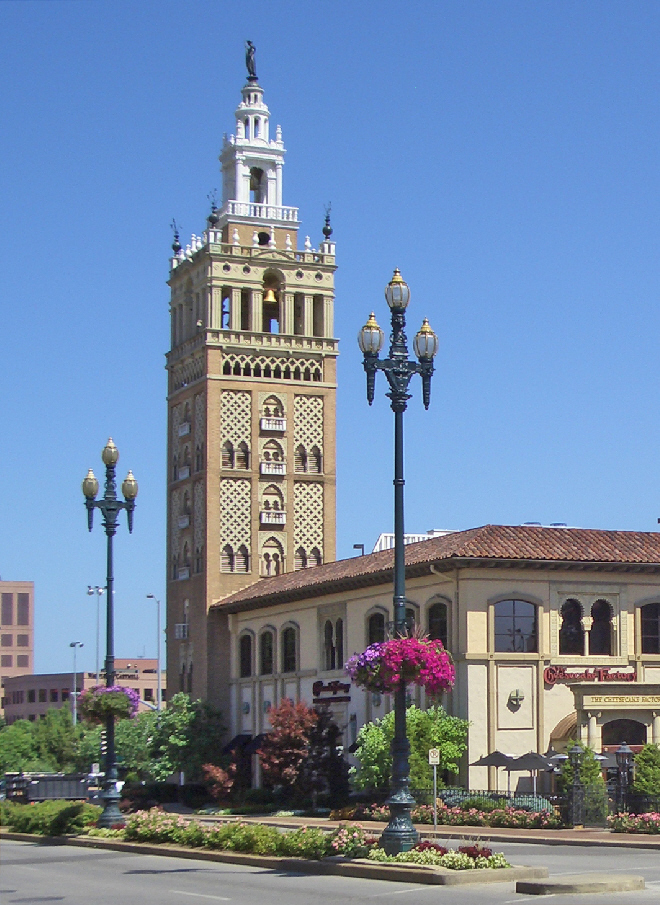
The Giralda Tower, inspired by the original at the Cathedral of Seville.

The basic design of the Country Club Plaza reflects classic European influences, especially those of Seville, Spain, yet it does not include a traditional open plaza. There are more than 30 statues, murals, and tile mosaics on display in the area, as well as major architectural reproductions, such as a half-sized Giralda Tower of Seville (the tallest building in the Plaza). The Plaza also includes reproductions of San Francisco's Path of Gold streetlights. Other works of art celebrate the classics, nature, and historical American themes such as westward expansion, and a magnificent fountain featuring four horses rearing up on their hind legs, designed by Henri-Léon Gréber.

Although the Plaza was designed and built to accommodate visitors arriving by automobile, it is unlike modern shopping malls with sprawling parking lots: parking is concealed in multilevel parking garages beneath and behind the shops, or on the rooftops of buildings.

The Plaza was also the first shopping center to use the percentage lease, where rents are based on a percentage of the gross receipts of tenants. This concept was novel when Nichols invented it, but it is now a standard practice in commercial leases.

Several companies are based in the Country Club Plaza area, including American Century Investments, Russell Stover Candies, Inergy, Gates Bar-B-Q, Lockton, Polsinelli, and Block Real Estate Services.

== Plaza lights ==
In 1925, a single strand of 16 colored-lights was placed above a doorway in the Country Club Plaza to celebrate Christmas. The number of lights increased annually, inspiring an official lighting ceremony that first took place in 1930. On Thanksgiving night, tens of thousands of people visit the Plaza for the local entertainment/performances and to watch the switch-throwing to initiate the Christmas season. A special guest or celebrity "flips the switch" each year. The Plaza's "Season of Lights" is one of the city's oldest traditions. The lights are turned on Thanksgiving evening and shine overnight through mid-January of the following year. The one or two-hour ceremony is broadcast live on local television station KMBC. During the 2018/2019 season, 8 year-old Kansas City resident Hazel Laurie suggested that if the Kansas City Chiefs won the Super Bowl, the lights should remain up the rest of the year.

== See also ==
- List of largest shopping malls in the United States
- List of neighborhoods in Kansas City, Missouri
- List of shopping malls in the United States
