= Maryland State Society Chapter House =

Historic house in Baltimore, Maryland

- U.S. Historic district – Contributing property
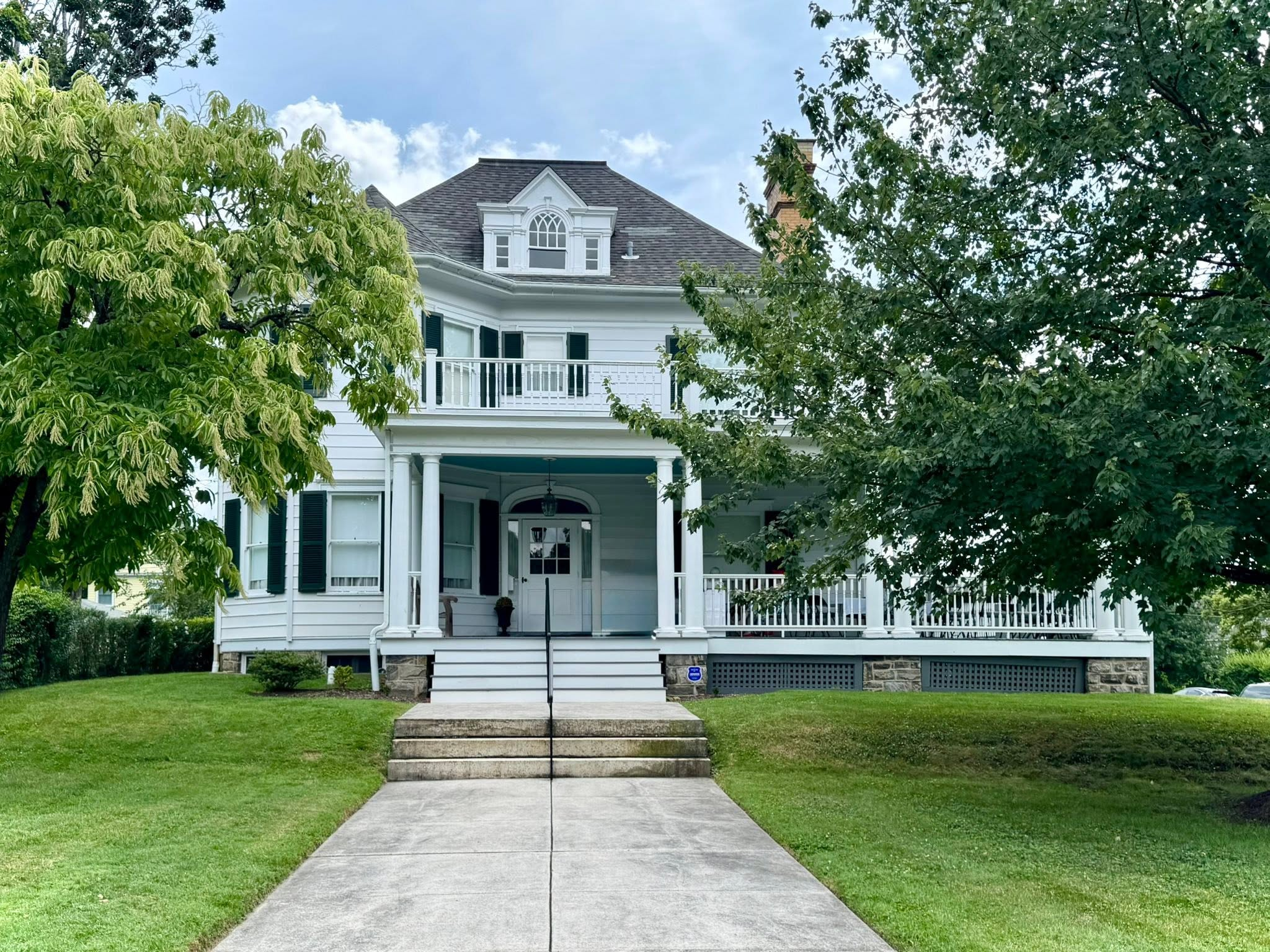
- The house in 2025
- Location: 4701 Roland Avenue
- Nearest city: Baltimore, Maryland, U.S.
- Coordinates: 39°20′52″N 76°38′07″W
- Built: c. 1892
- Architectural style: Queen Anne
- Part of: Roland Park Historic District (ID74002213)

Maryland State Society Chapter House is a historic Queen Anne style house in Baltimore, Maryland. The house is listed as part of the Roland Park Historic District on the National Register of Historic Places. The house was purchased by the Maryland State Society of the Daughters of the American Revolution in 1953.

== History ==
The Maryland State Society Chapter House was built by the Roland Park Company as a private residence around 1892. The wooden three-story house was built in the Queen Anne style. It is located in Roland Park and is included in the district's listing on the National Register of Historic Places.

On February 11, 1953, the Maryland State Society of the Daughters of the American Revolution purchased the house. The Daughters of the American Revolution use it as the society's state headquarters. The society hosts events and holds meetings at the house, and opens it up for tours for the public at certain times of the year.

On February 1, 2000, Maryland DAR State Regent, Elizabeth Ann Musgrove, placed a historic marker at the house.
