= Kansas City Country Club =

Country club in Missouri, U.S.

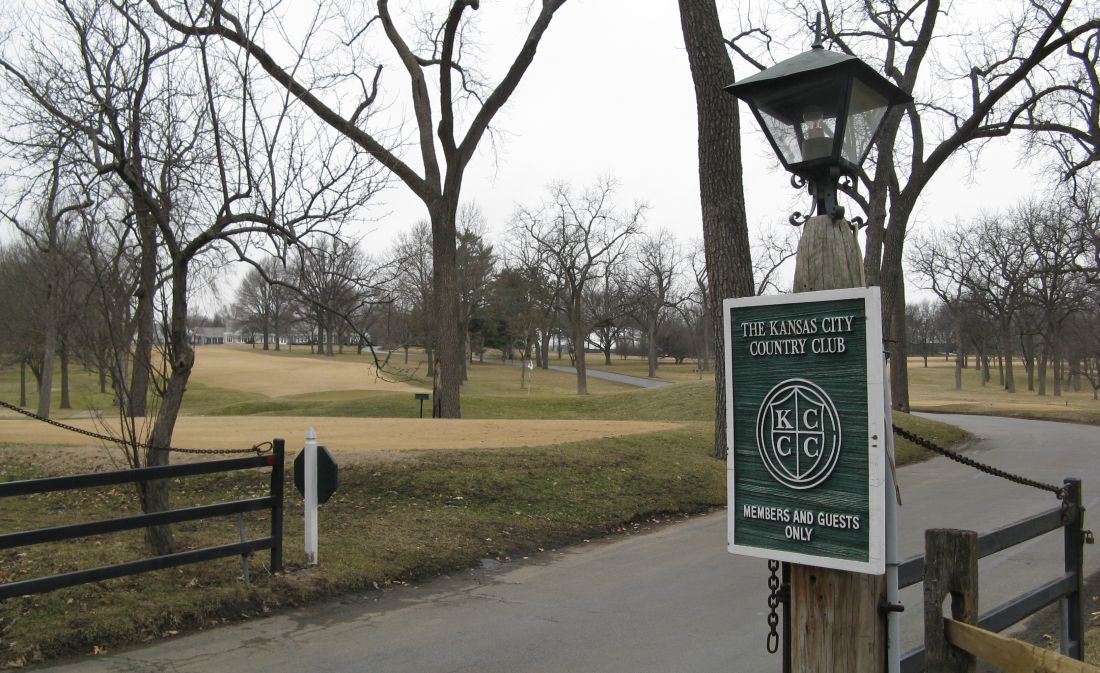

- Location within Kansas Location within the United States
- 39°01′17″N 94°37′13″W

Club information
- Location: Mission Hills, Kansas
- Established: 1896
- Type: Private
- Owner: Kansas City Golf Club
- Operator: Kansas City Golf Club
- Total holes: 18
- Designed by: A. W. Tillinghast/Robert Trent Jones/Andrew H. Green

The Kansas City Country Club (KCCC) is a country club which was founded in 1896 in Kansas City, Missouri and today located in Mission Hills, Kansas. The Country Club District and Country Club Plaza of Kansas City are named for the club, which claims to be the third-oldest country club west of the Mississippi River.

== History ==
The club has its roots in an informal golf course in the Hyde Park neighborhood of Kansas City, Missouri. In 1896, Hugh C. Ward, Charles Fessenden Morse, Jefferson Brumback, H. L. Harmon, A. W. Childs, C. J. Hubbard, J. E. Logan, Gardiner Lathrop, St. Clair Street, Ford Harvey, E. H. Chapman, E. S. Washburn, and W. B. Clarke incorporated the Kansas City Country Club and leased a pasture at what today is Loose Park in the Sunset Hill neighborhood of Kansas City, Missouri. The tract of land belonged to Ward's father Seth E. Ward, a pioneer who made his fortune outfitting settlers on the Oregon Trail.

In 1907, J. C. Nichols began buying land surrounding the course to develop the Country Club District, and later to develop the Country Club Plaza. In 1925, the club moved its course a mile west to the banks of Brush Creek in Mission Hills. The club's former grounds then became Loose Park. The three J.C. Nichols Clubs became the most socially desirable in the Kansas City Metropolitan area with Kansas City Country Club being first, followed by Mission Hills followed by Indian Hills.

The course was originally designed by Tom Bendelow and later redesigned by A. W. Tillinghast. The course par is 70. A renovation by Andrew Green, which finished in 2026, installed new irrigation and changed the order of the 10th and 18th holes.

The club did not allow Jewish members until 1990 when it admitted billionaire H&R Block founder Henry Bloch. The club had initially rejected Henry Bloch for being Jewish, but changed course after pro golfer Tom Watson resigned his membership in protest.

== Members ==
The club's most famous player is Tom Watson, who resigned in 1990 before rejoining after the club allowed its first Jewish member. Ray Watson, Tom's father, still holds the amateur record of 64 for the course. Tom Watson holds the professional record of 60. Tom is currently a member of the club.

== See also ==
- The Kansas City Club
- The Mission Hills Country Club, a nearby country club in the same city
