= Country Club District =

Human settlement in Missouri, United States

Coordinates: 39.02°N 94.60°W

The Country Club District is a group of neighborhoods forming a historic upscale residential district in Kansas City, developed by noted urban planner and real estate developer J. C. Nichols.

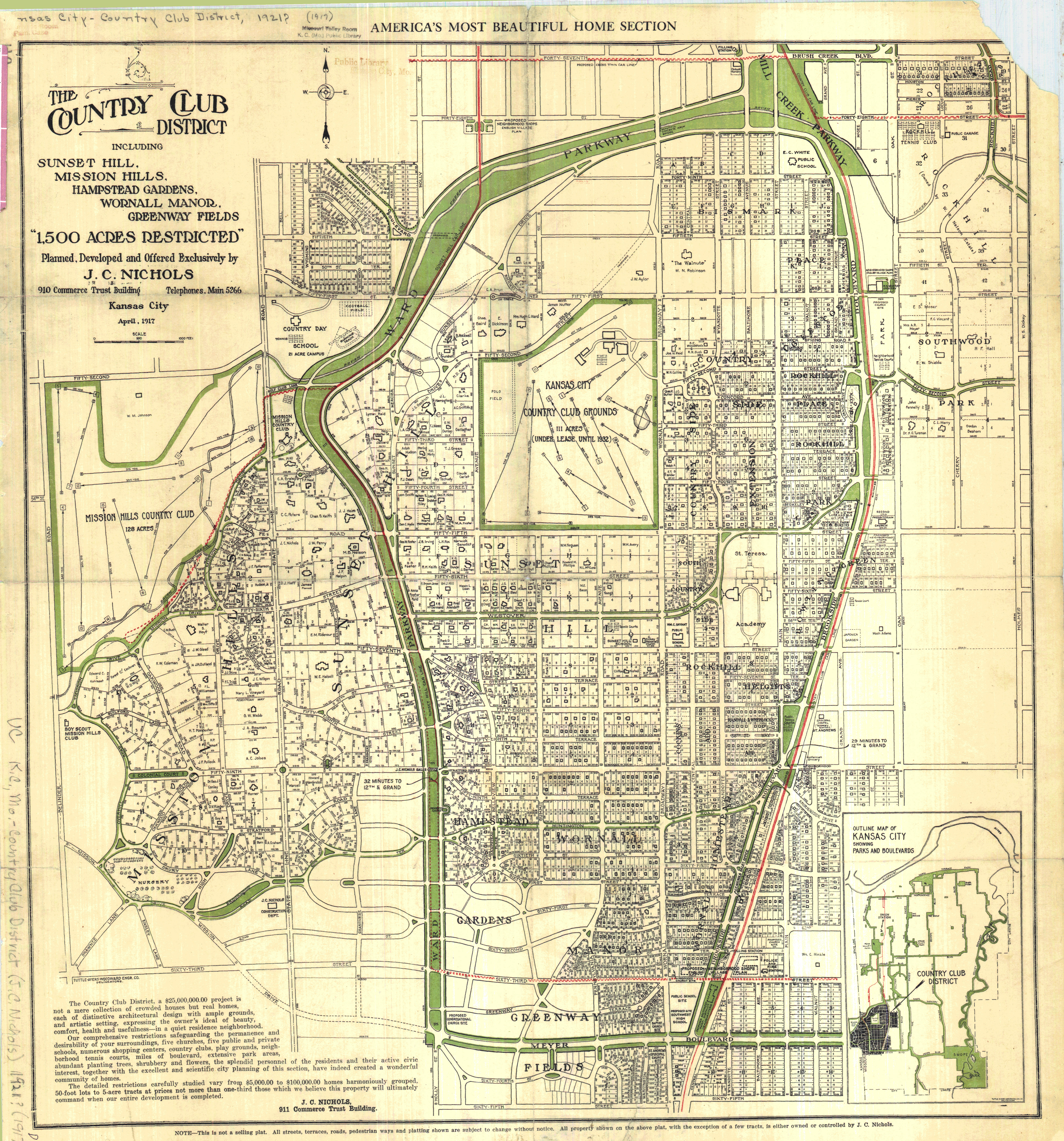
Map of "The Country Club District including Sunset Hill, Mission Hills, Hampstead Gardens, Wornall Manor, Greenway Fields, '1,500 Acres Restricted', Planned, Developed and Offered Exclusively by J. C. Nichols."

It was developed in stages, between 1906 and 1950, for a predominantly white, Anglo-Christian, upper-class and upper-middle-class regional monoculture that still exists in large part to this day, well over a century after the first home was erected. Called "a vast expanse of sylvan beauty," the District is home to approximately 60,000 and includes such well-known Kansas City neighborhoods as Sunset Hill and Brookside in Missouri, Mission Hills, Fairway, and the oldest parts of Prairie Village in Kansas. Ward Parkway, a wide, manicured boulevard, traverses the district running south from the Country Club Plaza, arguably the first multi-block, outdoor suburban shopping center in the United States. By the time developer Nichols died in 1950, the Country Club District covered more than 6,000 acres, making it the largest contiguous planned community built by a single developer in the United States.

== History ==
In 1905, J. C. Nichols and two lawyers, the Reed brothers, bought ten acres south of Westport and beyond Brush Creek, what was then outside the city limits. It was on a bluff overlooking the creek with a view of the estate and imposing limestone mansion of Nichols' mentor William Rockhill Nelson, forty years Nichols' senior, a real estate developer and the publisher of unusually lucrative daily newspapers, including The Kansas City Star.

The following year, 1906, Nichols began what he called Bismarck Place, the development of a few small houses, one into which he and his wife moved for a time. Two years later, he platted the neighborhood he called the Country Side District. That year, 1908, the Country Club streetcar line was extended to 51st and Brookside. As Bismarck Place expanded to include Country Side, he began to develop a master plan for an all-white, primarily Protestant-only suburb that he dubbed, in 1908, the Country Club District because of its proximity to what was then the site of Kansas City Country Club, now Loose Park.

Eventually, Nichols acquired a tract of land crossing from Missouri into Kansas, which now includes the neighborhood of Sunset Hill (in Missouri) and the cities of Mission Hills, Westwood Hills & Mission Woods (in Kansas). In April 1917, the District advertised subdivisions Sunset Hill, Mission Hills, Hampstead Gardens, Wornall Manor and Greenway Fields. By 1919, the company marketed estates in Indian Hills. Nichols also built the nearby Country Club Plaza, the first shopping district in the United States designed to accommodate patrons arriving by automobile.

Inspired by cityscapes and landscapes that Nichols experienced during visits to Europe in 1900 and 1921, the District's roads emulate lanes of villages in the English countryside: they are winding and tree shaded, lined with stone walls and arched bridges; some are named after English towns such as Huntingdon, Stratford and Dartmouth. Street corners are often marked by carved stone statuary, copies of old-world masters. Pergolas, cherub-studded water fountains, terraces and elaborate landscaping grace the entrances to titled subdivisions, which include Armour Hills, Armour Hills Gardens, Armour Estates, Holmes Park, Romanelli Gardens, Brookside Park, Ward Estates, Crestwood, Fairway, Sagamore Heights, Sunset Hill West and Westwood, to name a few.

Today, the Country Club District is said to be the largest contiguous planned community built by a single developer in the United States covering more than 6,000 acres.

== Homes and residents ==
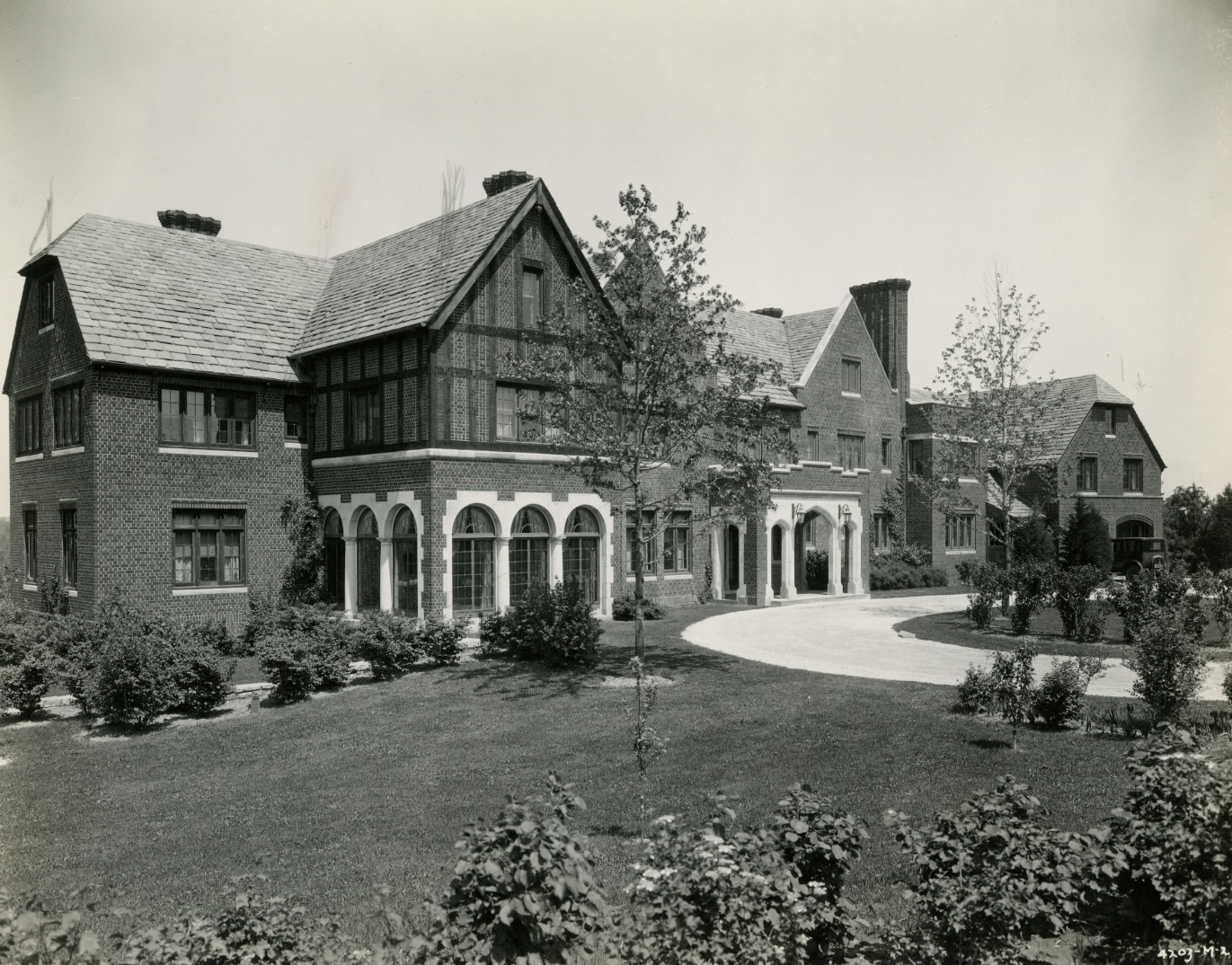
The Stover Mansion (1924), with 25 rooms, five fireplaces and a ballroom, is among the largest that the J.C. Nichols Company built in Mission Hills, Kansas, originally for Frank E. Jones. The Stovers purchased it when Russell Stover Candies moved its headquarters to Kansas City in 1931. Photo by Tyner & Murphy, Kansas City, Mo.

J. C. Nichols eventually planned and built hundreds of middle class and upper-middle-class homes in architectural styles ranging from Tudor Revival to Georgian to Colonial Revival to Spanish Architecture to Egyptian to Prairie School to English Gothic to Arts and Crafts to Moorish Revival, to name a few. Many residences erected in the 1910s and 1920s near the Country Club Plaza feature servants' and chauffeurs' quarters, screened-in porches, two-story carriage houses and commodious, landscaped lawns and gardens with fountains and statuary. Many homes were designed by, or after plans of, many noted architects, including Frank Lloyd Wright; McKim, Mead, and White; Louis Curtiss; Nelle Peters; and Mary Rockwell Hook. Several homes are listed on the National Register of Historic Places. Notable residents of the Country Club District have included:

- Mayor Harold Roe Bartle
- Mayor Richard L. Berkley
- H&R Block founders Richard Bloch and Henry Bloch
- Senator Kit Bond
- Major League Baseball Hall of Famer George Brett
- author Evan S. Connell
- Hall of Fame quarterback Len Dawson
- Hallmark Cards chairman Donald J. Hall, Sr.
- Hallmark Cards founder Joyce Hall
- composer John Kander
- businessman R. Crosby Kemper Jr.
- pharmaceutical magnate Ewing Kauffman and his wife Muriel Kauffman
- United States Senator Claire McCaskill
- UCLA and KU chancellor Franklin David Murphy
- New Yorker writer David Owen
- political boss Tom Pendergast
- Ambassador Charles H. Price II
- chemist and entrepreneur Russell Stover
- columnist Calvin Trillin
- professional golfer Tom Watson
- Mayor Charles Wheeler.

== Urban planning ==
The District became the premier model for cities expanding into suburbs across the country into the 21st century for its comprehensive urban planning, part of J. C. Nichols' total vision. Its development was not only about the well-designed and permanent homes that Nichols' company erected, its urban design consisted of many smaller elements, the whole of which would become substantially greater than its parts and included sylvan parks, exclusive social and recreational clubs, neighborhood associations, community centers, shopping villages, golf courses, playgrounds, schools, churches, swimming pools, fountains, sculpture, sidewalks, tree-lined boulevards, winding picturesque roads, cul-de-sacs and infrastructure. Its central traffic artery, the Ward Parkway, connects the entire District to the Country Club Plaza, and the Southwest Trafficway, which provides quick access to midtown and downtown Kansas City. Nichols hired several landscape architects and urban planners, including George Kessler, considered the father of Kansas City's Parks and Boulevard system.

The French author Andre Maurois, while lecturing at the University of Missouri-Kansas City, referred to the Country Club District, writing in his published journal:

"Who in Europe, or in America for that matter, knows that Kansas City is one of the loveliest cities on earth? And yet it is true. The downtown section is like any other in the United States, with its violent contrasts of skyscraper and wasteland. But the residential section is a masterpiece of city planning. The streets follow the curves of the hills or the winding of streams. Flowering shrubs encircle the houses. The homes themselves, designed in the best of taste, are artfully grouped in an immense park whose trees are unequaled in variety and luxuriance. At street crossings an antique statue, three shafts of Grecian columns rise from a carpet of low-growing foliage. Few cities have been built with so much regard for beauty."

J. C. Nichols' developments outside of the Country Club District included the remaining and more southern areas of Prairie Village such as the Corinth Square Shopping Center, which opened in 1955, and the surrounding subdivisions like Corinth Hills, Corinth Meadows, Corinth Estates, Somerset Hills, Somerset Manor, Ridgeview Heights, Town & Country Estates, Calvin Crest, Prairie Hills, Prairie Fields and Prairie Ridge, to name a few.

Historian and political analyst Thomas Frank grew up in Mission Hills, and in a 1995 article published in a magazine, he posits that J. C. Nichols designed the dream-like, suburban-scapes of the District so that its inhabitants would collectively begin a cycle of forgetting, about the increasing decay, at the time, of downtown Kansas City; its slaughterhouses and packinghouses and stockyards, a kind of whitewashing of the region's complicated, dirty, multiracial, often brutal history. He refers to the Country Club District's "overpowering europhilic reek. “Anywhere but here!" screams its architecture."

"Nothing here rings true," he writes. "Here stand some carefully-preserved fake ruins from the time when fake ruins were stylish in Italy; there rises a dummy bell-tower. Even the street names, which invariably refer to Spain, Italy, or fake-Indian whimsy, are in many cases not shared with the surrounding metropolis."

== Restrictive covenants ==
J. C. Nichols used restrictive covenants, or "deed restrictions", in each property in the district to control the use of the land. Most of the covenants pertain to the uses to which the property owner could put his land, or setback and free space requirements.

A controversial aspect of the covenants in the district, however, was the use of racial restrictions that prohibited ownership and occupation by African Americans. The 1948 Supreme Court decision Shelley v. Kraemer rendered such restrictions unenforceable, and the Fair Housing Act of 1968 prohibited the future incorporation of such covenants. Nevertheless, restrictions continue to appear in the deeds to Country Club District properties. The restrictions require that a notice to amend be filed five years in advance of the deed restrictions renewal date, usually every 20 to 25 years; and that all homeowners must agree to the change with a notarized vote. This practical difficulty is the reason racial restrictions continue to appear throughout the district. At the same time, this practical difficulty has protected the other covenants from change, and thus has helped to preserve the essential character of the neighborhood and to resist encroachment by commercial developers.

In 1948, capitalizing on the District's success, or reacting against its exclusion of Black people, or both, W. G. Pinkard published a two-page booklet entitled, "Buy Now In the Negro Country Club District." It was a promotional leaflet advertising housing development in Kansas City, with text from its library entry reading: "Buy now in the Negro Country Club District, Kansas City, Kansas, beautiful homes and building lots, splendid transportation service, bus and street car. Ex-service men use your bonus money to protect your family with a home." There appears to be only one existing copy of the pamphlet remaining, held at Columbia University Libraries, New York City.

While J. C. Nichols utilized the restrictive covenant model to bar non-whites from his neighborhoods, Nichols was not the first in Kansas City to engage in the practice. In fact, such practice had been in full force in Kansas City since the time Nichols was born in the 1880s. Moreover, although Nichols's covenants were discriminatory, Kansas City historian William S. Worley noted that Nichols was among the first of his contemporaries to abandon the practice of barring sale to Jews.

Today the Country Club District is still predominantly white, and still is home to Kansas City's wealthiest residents.

== School desegregation and white flight ==
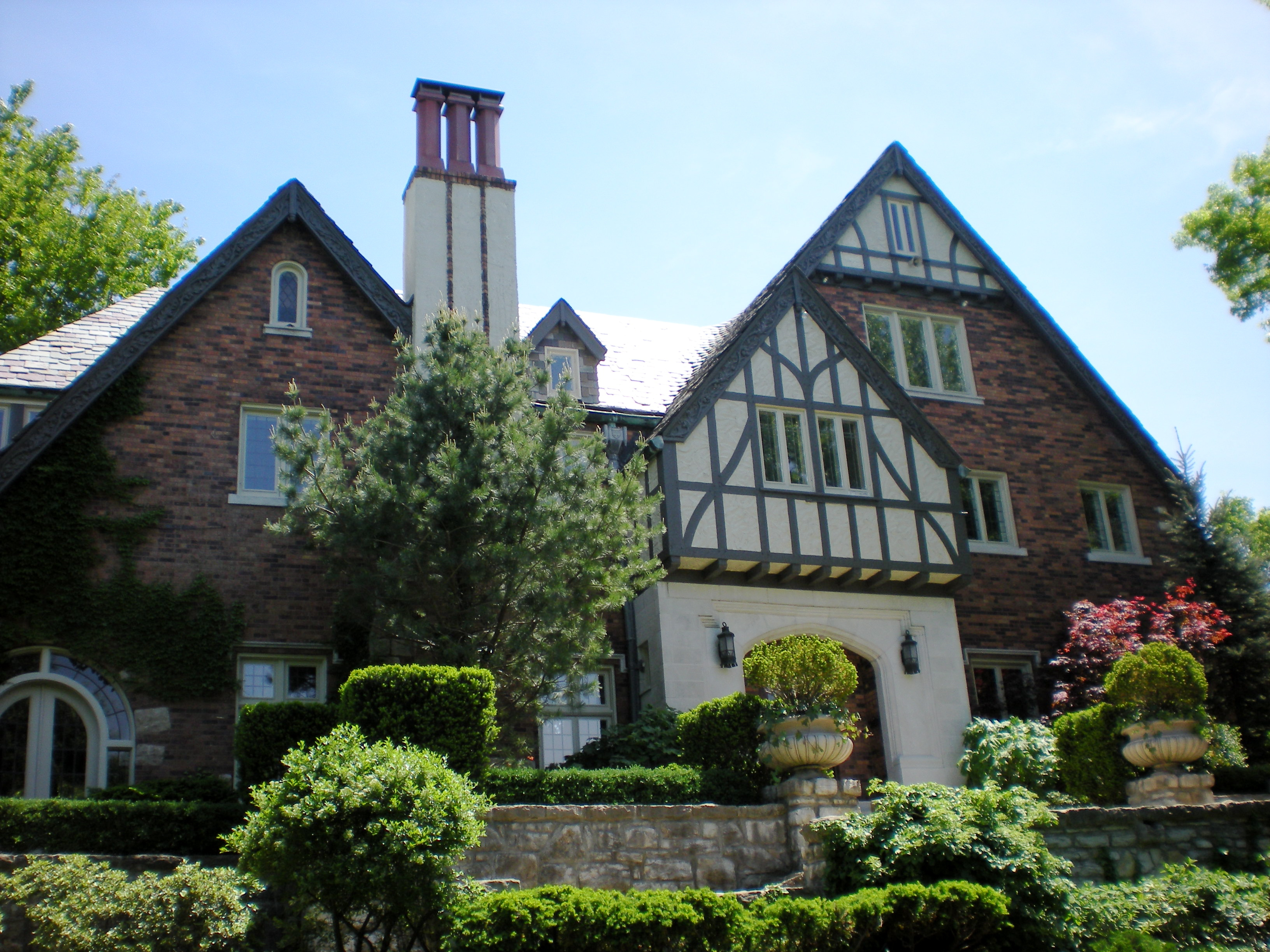
Home in the present-day Country Club District

On the Missouri side, many Country Club residents formerly sent their children to Southwest High School, a public school in the Kansas City School District. At its peak in the mid-1960s, Southwest enrolled more than 2,400 students, 20% of whose parents were Southwest alumni. After the end of racial segregation in schools under Brown v. Board of Education, however, Kansas City, Missouri, experienced considerable "white flight."

It wasn't until the 1970s when Southwest High School experienced large scale desegregation. In the 1972–1973 school year, 2% of Southwest's students were Black. In the following years, the school saw increases of Black students, most bused in from neighborhoods outside the Country Club District, until becoming predominantly Black in the late 1970s. This was due to full scale busing that began in the 1975–1976 school year. By the following year, a large proportion of inhabitants of the Country Club District were shifting away from enrolling their children in Southwest High School, George Caleb Bingham Junior High School and elementary feeder schools like William Cullen Bryant Elementary School.

An example in the Country Club District in the late 1960s was 30-year-old, second-generation white Country Club resident William G. Carolan, who was born at the Frankford Hospital in Philadelphia. His great-grandfather was born outside of Kells, Ireland and came to Willow Grove during the Great Hunger. William purchased a four-bedroom, three-bath home on 57th Street, east of Ward Parkway in the Sunset Hill neighborhood of the District. The house was erected in 1922 with two, second-story sleeping porches and a housekeeper's apartment in the basement, on a lot that was owned by the president of the Askew Saddlery Company. Banker William Thorton Kemper Sr. and J. Z. Miller Jr., governor of the Federal Reserve Bank of Kansas City, owned homes next door at the time.

Decades later, in the summer of 1967, William moved here with Connie J. Felt and their three children from Nall Hills, a subdivision of Overland Park, where they had purchased a more modest home after their marriage. William grew up in the Country Club District where his father had purchased a home on 55th Street in the late 1940s. William graduated from Southwest High School and was vice-president of two family-owned engineering firms. By 1970, there were five children, and by 1977, the couple had enrolled them in private schools outside of the District because of desegregation. Two years later, for reasons including the perceived declining quality of education in the local Kansas City Public Schools (Missouri), William sold the house on 57th Street and purchased a four-bedroom, two-bath home across the state line, in Corinth Meadows, which fell within the Shawnee Mission School District, where the children finished their primary and secondary schooling. Corinth Meadows is a neighborhood of Prairie Village, Kansas, which was also developed by J. C. Nichols.

By the 1997–1998 school year, Southwest High School's final year in existence, enrollment had dropped to below 500. As recently as 2008, nearly all residents of the Missouri side of the Country Club District sent their children to private schools, including Pembroke Hill School, The Barstow School, Rockhurst High School, St. Teresa's Academy, and Notre Dame de Sion. Today, many residents send their children to charter schools including Academie Lafayette, Crossroads Academy, and Citizens of the World; and district schools Hale Cook, Foreign Language Academy, and Border Star Montessori.

== Trivia ==
In 1928, Ernest Hemingway and his second wife, Pauline, stayed at several homes in the District's Mission Hills. They were expecting their first child, Patrick, and Hemingway was finishing his novel, A Farewell to Arms. He wrote to his father: “This is a nice town with some good guys. Simple as hell – everybody with lots of money doing all the things the English do without English accents and no bloody snobbery.” They returned in 1931 for the birth of their next child while Hemingway was finishing his non-fiction book Death in the Afternoon.

For two weeks in October 1977, renowned artist couple Christo and Jeanne-Claude wrapped Loose Park's 4.5 km of footpaths in 12,500 square meters of shiny, saffron-yellow nylon; the project cost the artists $130,000. Loose Park is in the District.

In 1970, members of the Students for a Democratic Society (SDS) were charged with pipe bombing the home of the District's creator J. C. Nichols, in addition to other places in Kansas City. Three SDS members were convicted. See United States District Court for the Western District of Missouri, Western Division (Kansas City), Criminal Case Files (1879–1972), Case 23498.

== See also ==
- Mr. and Mrs. Bridge
  - Merchant Ivory film based on Evan S. Connell's novels, filmed largely on location
- Quality Hill
  - Kansas City neighborhood which was the predecessor to the Country Club District
- List of neighborhoods in Kansas City, Missouri
