= Earl Stewart =

American golfer (1921–1990)

Personal information
- Full name: Earl Richard Stewart Jr.
- Nationality: United States
- Born: October 15, 1921 Dallas, Texas, U.S.
- Died: July 11, 1990 (aged 68) Quitman, Texas, U.S.
- Height: 5 ft 10 in (1.78 m)
- Weight: 153 lb (69 kg; 10.9 st)

Career
- Sport: Golf
- College: Louisiana State University
- Turned professional: 1950
- Former tour: PGA Tour
- Professional wins: 4

Number of wins by tour
- PGA Tour: 3
- Other: 1

Best results in major championships
- Masters Tournament: T16: 1953
- PGA Championship: T26: 1967
- U.S. Open: T10: 1952
- The Open Championship: DNP

Earl Richard Stewart Jr. (October 15, 1921 – July 11, 1990) was an American professional golfer. He played on the PGA Tour in the 1950s and 1960s and was a college head golf coach in the 1970s and 1980s.

== Early life and amateur career ==
Stewart was born in Dallas, Texas. He graduated from Dallas' Sunset High School in 1938.

Stewart attended Louisiana State University and was a member of the golf team. In 1941, he won the NCAA Championship, and led the Bayou Bengals to a share of the NCAA team title in 1942.

== Professional career ==
In 1950, Stewart turned pro. He had three wins in PGA Tour events during his career. His first win came at the 1953 Greater Greensboro Open. He would win the Ardmore Open later that year. His best finishes in major championships were T10 at the 1952 U.S. Open and T16 at The Masters in 1953. Like many professional golfers of his generation, Stewart earned his living primarily as a club pro. His third and final win on the PGA Tour, the 1961 Dallas Open Invitational, came on his own course at the Oak Cliff Country Club.

Stewart was the head golf coach at Southern Methodist University from 1975–1987. He coached both the men's and women's teams. Men's golf was dropped by the university in 1980. He won a national championship with the women's team in 1979. One of his students was Payne Stewart.

== Death ==
In 1990, Stewart died after a long illness at the age of 68 at his home in Quitman, Texas.

== Awards and honors ==
- Stewart was inducted into the Sunset High School Hall of Fame.
- In 1987, he was inducted into the National Golf Coaches Association Coaches Hall of Fame for his role as a women's collegiate golf coach at SMU.

== Amateur wins ==
- 1941 NCAA Championship (individual medalist)

== Professional wins (4) ==
=== PGA Tour wins (3) ===
No.	Date	Tournament	Winning score	Margin of victory	Runner(s)-up
1	Mar 30, 1953	Greater Greensboro Open	−5 (70-68-69-68=275)	Playoff	(United States) Doug Ford, (United States) Sam Snead, (United States) Art Wall Jr.
2	May 10, 1953	Ardmore Open	+2 (67-68-73-74=282)	3 strokes	(United States) Jerry Barber
3	Sep 4, 1961	Dallas Open Invitational	−6 (67-72-68-71=278)	1 stroke	(United States) Gay Brewer, (United States) Arnold Palmer, (United States) Doug Sanders

PGA Tour playoff record (1–2)

No.	Year	Tournament	Opponent(s)	Result
1	1953	Houston Open	(Australia) Jim Ferrier, (United States) Shelley Mayfield, (United States) Cary Middlecoff, (United States) Bill Nary	Middlecoff won 18-hole playoff; Middlecoff: −3 (69), Ferrier: −1 (71), Mayfield: −1 (71), Stewart: E (72), Nary: +3 (75)
2	1953	Greater Greensboro Open	(United States) Doug Ford, (United States) Sam Snead, (United States) Art Wall Jr.	Won with par on first extra hole after 18-hole playoff; Stewart: −2 (68), Snead: −2 (68), Ford: E (70), Wall: +2 (72)
3	1954	Insurance City Open	(United States) Tommy Bolt	Lost 18-hole playoff; Stewart conceded on final hole

=== Other wins (1) ===
- 1950 Orlando Two-Ball (with Patty Berg)
