= 1935 PGA Championship =

Coordinates: 35.511°N 97.455°W

Tournament information
- Dates: October 17–23, 1935
- Location: Oklahoma City, Oklahoma
- Course: Twin Hills Golf & Country Club
- Organized by: PGA of America
- Tour: PGA Tour
- Format: Match play - 6 rounds

Statistics
- Par: 70
- Length: 6,280 yards (5,742 m)
- Field: 112 players, 64 to match play
- Cut: 154 (+14), playoff
- Prize fund: $7,820
- Winner's share: $1,000

Champion
- (United States) Johnny Revolta
- def. Tommy Armour, 5 and 4

Location in the United States
Location in Oklahoma

The 1935 PGA Championship was the 18th PGA Championship, held October 17–23 at Twin Hills Golf & Country Club in Oklahoma City, Oklahoma. Then a match play championship, Johnny Revolta won his only major title, defeating Tommy Armour 5 and 4.

The match play field was increased in 1935 to 64 players, with the first two rounds at 18 holes each, played on the first day, Friday. Weather caused a one-day delay in the schedule and the finals were held on Wednesday.

Defending champion Paul Runyan lost 3 and 2 in the quarterfinals to Al Zimmerman of Portland, Oregon. Five-time champion Walter Hagen, age 42, was the medalist in qualifying with 139 (−1), but lost in the first round to Revolta, 1 up.

== Format ==
The match play format at the PGA Championship in 1935 called for 12 rounds (216 holes) in six days:

- Thursday – 36-hole stroke play qualifier (continued on Friday)
  - defending champion Paul Runyan and top 63 professionals advanced to match play
- Friday – first two rounds, 18 holes each (continued on Saturday)
- Saturday – third round – 36 holes (played on Sunday)
- Sunday – quarterfinals – 36 holes (played on Monday)
- Monday – semifinals – 36 holes (played on Tuesday)
- Tuesday – final – 36 holes (played on Wednesday)

== Final results ==
Wednesday, October 23, 1935

Place	Player	Money ($)
1	(United States) Johnny Revolta	1,000
2	(United States) Tommy Armour	500
T3	(United States) Al Watrous	250
T3	(United States) Al Zimmerman	250
T5	(United States) Ed Dudley	200
T5	(United States) Paul Runyan	200
T5	(United States) Eddie Schultz	200
T5	(United States) Horton Smith	200

== Final eight bracket ==
Quarter-finals; October 21
Johnny Revolta	4&2
Eddie Schultz
Al Zimmerman	3&2
Paul Runyan
Tommy Armour	39h
Ed Dudley
Al Watrous	1up
Horton Smith

Semi-finals; October 22
Johnny Revolta	4&3
Al Zimmerman
Tommy Armour	2&1
Al Watrous

Finals; October 23
Johnny Revolta	5&4
Tommy Armour

== Final match scorecards ==
Morning

Hole	1	2	3	4	5	6	7	8	9	10	11	12	13	14	15	16	17	18
Par	4	4	4	3	5	4	3	4	4	4	3	4	4	3	4	5	4	4
Revolta	3	4	4	3	5	4	2	4	4	4	3	5	4	2	5	6	4	4
Armour	4	4	4	3	5	4	4	4	5	4	3	4	5	3	4	5	5	5
Leader	R1	R1	R1	R1	R1	R1	R2	R2	R3	R3	R3	R2	R3	R4	R3	R2	R3	R4

Afternoon

Hole	1	2	3	4	5	6	7	8	9	10	11	12	13	14	15	16	17	18
Par	4	4	4	3	5	4	3	4	4	4	3	4	4	3	4	5	4	4
Revolta	5	4	4	2	4	4	3	4	5	4	3	4	6	3	Revolta wins 5 and 4			
Armour	4	4	4	3	5	4	3	5	5	4	3	4	4	3	Revolta wins 5 and 4			
Leader	R3	R3	R3	R4	R5	R5	R5	R6	R6	R6	R6	R6	R5	R5	Revolta wins 5 and 4			

Birdie	Bogey	Double bogey
