= Askew Saddlery Company =

The Askew Saddlery Company was established in 1866 in Kansas City, Missouri, and was known as a favorite saddle and leather outfitter of cowboys who drove cattle herds to beef markets in Kansas City and Chicago, Illinois.

When the company started, it had six employees. By 1900, it had 135 factory workers and additional administrative positions.
