= Inergy =

American supplier of propane

Inergy, L.P. (NYSE: NRGY) is an American supplier of propane based in Kansas City, Missouri that claims to be the fourth-largest propane retailer in the United States. Serving 800,000 customers in 28 states. It is also a major salt miner via its U.S. Salt LLC subsidiary with its salt caverns later being used for natural gas storage.

It was founded in 1998 by its current president and CEO John J. Sherman after he sold his start up propane marketing company LPG Services Group to Dynegy. As of November 2010, the company had acquired 89 businesses – mostly regional and local propane distributors.

It operates 28 states and employs approximately 3,000 associates and has 700,000 customers.

In August 2010 it acquired its parent Inergy Holdings which had also traded on the New York Stock Exchange under the ticker symbol NRGP in a deal valued at $2 billion with the resulting company being reported to be worth $6 billion. Prior to the acquisition both companies shared the same offices in Kansas City.

== Midstream operations ==
Its midstream operations include

- West Coast Midstream Operations near Bakersfield, California which provides 25 million ft^{3} (710,000 m^{3}) per day natural gas processing as well as a rail and truck terminals.
- Tres Palacios Gas Storage, Matagorda County, Texas adjacent to the Eagle Ford Formation which has 38.4 billion ft^{3} (1.09 billion m^{3}) of working gas
- Steuben Gas Storage, Steuben County, New York, 6.2 billion ft^{3} (180 million m^{3}) of gas storage
- Thomas Corners Gas Storage Steuben County, New York, 7.0 billion ft^{3} (200 million m^{3}) of storage
- Finger Lakes LPG Storage, Steuben County with 1.7 million bbl (270,000 m^{3}) LPG storage and Watkins Glen, New York facility 5 million bbl (790 thousand m^{3}) of LPG storage.
- U.S. Salt Gas Storage Development, Watkins Glen, 5 to 10 billion ft^{3} (140 to 280 million m^{3}) of natural gas storage capacity in salt caverns.
- Stagecoach Storage - 26.25 billion ft^{3} (743 million m^{3}) of storage in the Marcellus Formation
- U.S. Salt LLC Operations, Watkins Glen on Seneca Lake, New York - sells 300,000 short tons (270,000 metric tons) of salt each year and has 40 million bbl (6.4 million m^{3}) of cavern capacity for gas

== Retail propane services ==
The company has purchased various regional or local propane operations which continue to operate under their original names including:

- Arrow Gas
- Blue Flame
- Blue Ridge Propane
- Blu-Gas
- Bradley Propane
- Burnwell Gas
- Country Gas
- Delta Propane
- Dowdle Gas
- Eastside Gas
- Farm & Home Oil Company
- Gaylord Gas
- Hancock Gas Service
- Highland Propane
- Homestead Propane
- Hoosier Propane
- Independent Propane Company
- Jenkins Gas
- Legacy Propane
- Liberty Propane
- Maingas
- McCracken Propane
- MGS Propane
- Modern Gas
- Moulton Gas Service
- Northwest Energy
- Ohio Gas and Appliance
- Pearl Gas
- Pennington Gas Service
- Permagas
- ProGas
- Pyrofax Energy
- Rocky Mountain Propane
- Shirley Bottle Gas
- Silgas
- Southeast Propane
- Tru-Gas
- United Propane
- Yates Gas
