= Ardmore Open =

Golf tournament formerly on the PGA Tour

The Ardmore Open was a golf tournament on the PGA Tour from 1952 to 1954. It was played at Dornick Hills Golf & Country Club in Ardmore, Oklahoma.

== Winners ==
Year	Player	Country	Score	To par	Margin of victory	Runner-up	Winner's share ($)	Ref
1954	Julius Boros	United States	279	−1	1 stroke	(United States) Jerry Barber	7,200	
1953	Earl Stewart	United States	282	+2	3 strokes	(United States) Jerry Barber	6,900	
1952	Dave Douglas	United States	279	−1	2 strokes	(United States) Dutch Harrison	5,400	

== See also ==
- Ardmore Open (LPGA Tour) – a 1954 LPGA Tour event
