= Ardmore Open (LPGA Tour) =

Golf tournament held only once in 1954

The Ardmore Open was a golf tournament on the LPGA Tour, played only in 1954. It was played at the Ardmore Country Club in Ardmore, Oklahoma. Patty Berg won the event.

== See also ==
- Ardmore Open - a PGA Tour event from 1952 to 1954
