= J. C. Nichols =

American real estate developer (1880–1950)

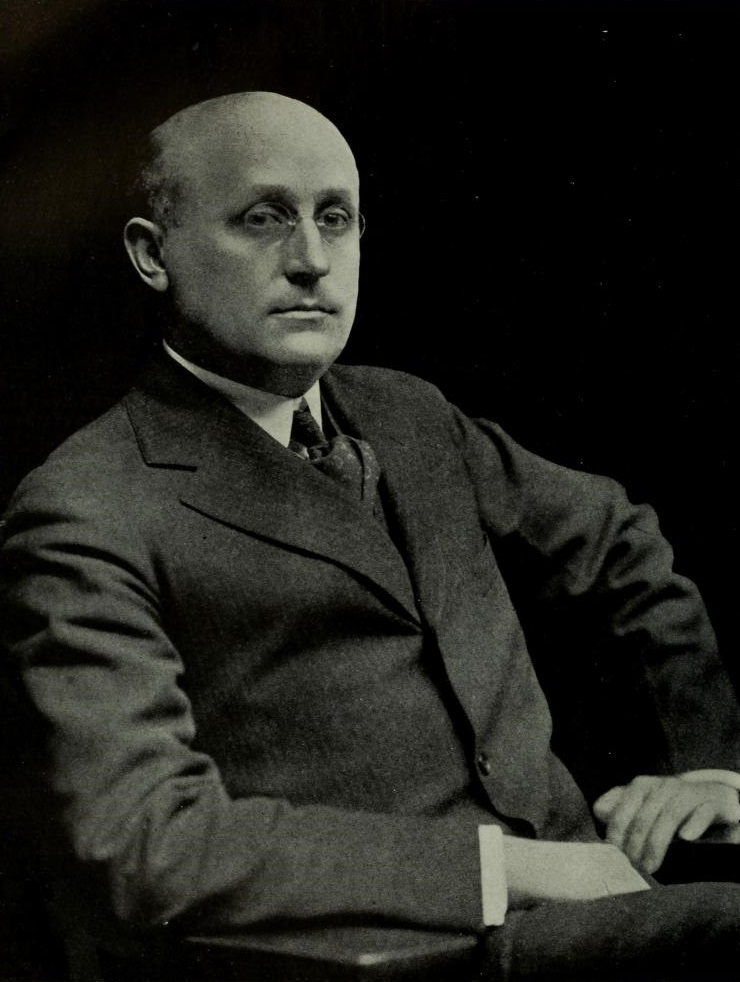
- Born: Jesse Clyde Nichols; August 23, 1880; Olathe, Kansas, U.S.
- Died: February 16, 1950 (aged 69); Kansas City, Missouri, U.S.
- Resting place: Forest Hill Calvary Cemetery; Kansas City, Missouri, U.S.
- Education: University of Kansas (B.A.); Harvard University (B.A.)
- Occupation: Real estate developer
- Spouse: Jessie Miller (m. 1905)

Jesse Clyde "J. C." Nichols (August 23, 1880 – February 16, 1950) was an American urban planner and developer of commercial and residential real estate in Kansas City, Missouri.

Born in Olathe, Kansas, and a student at the University of Kansas and Harvard University, his most notable developments are the Country Club District and Country Club Plaza in Kansas City, which influenced suburban developments in other parts of the United States. He served leadership roles in local and national real estate organizations. Through these organizations, his ideas about real estate and planning helped to shape methods for racist and antisemitic restrictive covenants and zoning. His legacy has come under increasing scrutiny for these covenants, which prohibited Blacks, Jews, and other minorities from living in these neighborhoods.

== Early life ==
Jesse Clyde Nichols was born in 1880, a son of farmers living near Olathe, Kansas. He worked various jobs while attending high school, and worked for a year after graduation selling wholesale meat. While he matriculated at the University of Kansas, he managed the college football team, reported for a newspaper, and served as class president. Graduating at the top of his class with a Bachelor of Arts degree in 1902, he accepted a one-year scholarship at Harvard University, and earned a second Bachelor of Arts degree there in 1903. Nichols returned to Kansas City and joined some college friends to establish Reed, Nichols & Company, operating as real estate developers. In 1905, he married Jessie Miller, a woman from Olathe, Kansas.

== Subdivision development ==
Nichols called his method for establishing residential subdivisions "planning for permanence", for his objective was to "develop whole residential neighborhoods that would attract an element of people who desired a better way of life, a nicer place to live and would be willing to work in order to keep it better". His philosophy about subdivision planning greatly influenced other developments in the United States, including the Beverly Hills and Westwood neighborhoods of Los Angeles, Highland Park neighborhood of Dallas, and the River Oaks neighborhood in Houston, Texas.

Nichols advocated preservation of trees and natural contours, while proscribing gridiron street networks. His Country Club District in Kansas City placed many restrictions on the use of property within the subdivision, which Nichols believed made the lots more valuable to potential homeowners. His advertisements promoted permanence. All homeowners were required to belong to the Country Club District's homeowners association, which monitored how well homeowners maintained their lawns, but also provided services like garbage collection and street cleaning. Builders were required to observe large minimum lot sizes and large setbacks from the street. Nichols also imposed racially based covenants on all properties in the Country Club District.

The Country Club District, Nichols's master-planned community in Kansas City, Missouri, inspired River Oaks in Houston, Texas. Will Hogg, his brother Mike, and Hugh Potter visited the area and sought the advice of Nichols while they were planning River Oaks. Nichols had a short list of exemplary communities, and urged Potter to visit them. These included Forest Hill Gardens in Queens, New York; Palos Verdes Estates in Los Angeles County; Roland Park in Baltimore, Maryland; and Shaker Heights in Cleveland, Ohio. Potter eventually was appointed President of the River Oaks Corporation, and continued to seek the advice of Nichols during his tenure.

== Innovations and leadership ==
Nichols originated the percentage lease, where rents are based on tenants' gross receipts. The percentage lease is now a standard practice in commercial leasing across the United States. Modern outdoor shopping centers, now common in the United States, share a common ancestor in the Country Club Plaza, which opened in Kansas City in 1923. The Urban Land Institute's J. C. Nichols Prize for Visionaries in Urban Development (now the ULI Prize for Visionaries in Urban Development) had been named in his honor.

Nichols was a prominent civic booster in Kansas City, being involved in the creation of the Liberty Memorial, Nelson-Atkins Museum of Art, MRIGlobal, as well as the development of Kansas City University, now the University of Missouri-Kansas City.

Nichols served in leadership positions of local and national real estate and planning organizations. He was a member of the General Committee of the National Conference on City Planning. He headed the Kansas City Real Estate Board and the National Conference of Subdividers. He was a founder of the Urban Land Institute and chaired its Community Builders’ Council . He chaired the Home Builders and Subdividers Division of the National Association of Real Estate Boards (NAREB), chaired NAREB's War Service Board, and served as NAREB director.

=== Racist restrictions ===
J.C. Nichols relied on restrictive covenants to control the uses of the lands in the neighborhoods he developed. Most of the covenants restricted the lands to residential uses, and contained other features such as setback and free space requirements. However, homes in the Country Club District were restricted with covenants that prohibited Blacks and Jews from owning or occupying the homes.; and likewise in his Johnson County, Kansas developments. Nichols did not invent the practice, but he used it to effectively bar ethnic minorities from living in his properties during the first half of the century. His restrictive covenant model was later adopted by the federal government to help implement similar policies in other regions of the United States. Ultimately, the 1948 Supreme Court decision Shelley v. Kraemer made such covenants unenforceable. Nevertheless, language referencing these covenants remained on the multitude of deed documents for decades after the Supreme Court decision because the relative difficulty of revising them one by one could be used covertly to continue existence of the covenants. The deed restrictions in most neighborhoods renew automatically every twenty to twenty-five years unless a majority of the homeowners agree to change them with notarized votes, about which fact publicity is assiduously avoided. In 2005, Missouri passed a law allowing (but not requiring) the governing bodies of homeowner's associations to delete restrictive covenants from deed restrictions without a vote of the members. The Country Club District is predominantly white, and it is among the wealthiest, most sought-after neighborhoods in the United States.

== Legacy ==
Nichols's real estate policies created a racial and economic divide to split Kansas City in half along Troost Avenue for the indefinite future. This eventually crashed the home values on the east side where Blacks and Jews were allowed. When nationwide racial integration laws came in the 1960s, this total divide thwarted their implementation by Kansas City's public education system, and ensured that KCPS's racial population will remain mostly non-white.

In mass resentment of this legacy, intensified in 2020 by the George Floyd protests, Kansas City removed his name from the historic fountain and road in front of Country Club Plaza.

In 1970, members of the Students for a Democratic Society (SDS) were charged with pipe bombing places in Kansas City, including the home of his son Miller Nichols, then president of the J.C. Nichols company. Three SDS members were convicted.

== Death ==
Nichols died of cancer on February 16, 1950, at his home at 1214 West 55th Street. He was buried at Forest Hill Calvary Cemetery in Kansas City. His home is on Ward Parkway in Kansas City.
