= Pickering =

Pickering may refer to:

== Places ==
=== Antarctica ===
- Pickering Nunataks, Alexander Island

=== Australia ===
- Pickering, South Australia, the original name (1872–1940) of the town of Wool Bay
- Pickering Brook, Western Australia, Australia

=== Canada ===
- Pickering, Ontario
- Pickering Village, Ontario

=== England ===
- Pickering, North Yorkshire
- Pickering Lythe, a wapentake of Yorkshire
- Pickering Beck, North Yorkshire
- Vale of Pickering, North Yorkshire
  - Lake Pickering, a former lake

=== United States ===
- Pickering, Missouri
- Pickerington, Ohio
- Pickering, Pennsylvania
- Pickering Township, Bottineau County, North Dakota
- Mount Pickering, California
- Pickering Creek, Pennsylvania, a tributary of the Schuylkill River
- Pickering Passage, Washington, a strait
- Fort Pickering, Massachusetts, a 17th-century fort on the National Register of Historic Places
- Fort Pickering (Memphis, Tennessee), a Confederate fort in the American Civil War

=== Outer space ===
- Pickering (lunar crater)
- Pickering (Martian crater)

== People and fictional characters ==
- Pickering (surname), a list of people and fictional characters
- Pickering Phipps, three related people in England in the 18th to 20th centuries

== Schools ==
- Pickering College, Newmarket, Ontario, Canada
- Pickering High School (disambiguation), several schools in various countries

== Sports ==
- Pickering FC, a Canadian soccer team
- Pickering Panthers, a Junior "A" ice hockey team from Pickering, Ontario, Canada
- Pickering Town F.C., an English football team

== Other uses ==
- Pickering's Defense, a chess opening
- USS Pickering (1798), an American schooner
- Pickering House (disambiguation), several houses
- Pickering Operations Complex, a skyscraper on Pickering Street in Singapore
- Pickering Interfaces, a British test and measurement company
- Pickering Nuclear Generating Station, a nuclear power plant in Canada
- Pickering and Company, an American phonograph cartridge manufacturer, predecessor of Stanton Magnetics
- Pickering baronets, two extinct titles, one in the Baronetage of Nova Scotia, the other in the Baronetage of England
- Pickering Medal, a New Zealand honour for promoting commercial success
- Pickering Valley Railroad, a defunct railroad in Chester County, Pennsylvania

== See also ==
- Pickering emulsion, an emulsion stabilized by solid particles
- Pickering scale, a rating of astronomical seeing
- "Pickering test" in First Amendment law - see Pickering v. Board of Education
