= Wolcott House =

Wolcott House may refer to:

in the United States (by state then city)

- Oliver Wolcott House, Litchfield, Connecticut, listed on the NRHP in Litchfield County
- Wolcott House (Wolcott, Indiana), formerly listed on the NRHP
- Frank D. Wolcott House, Hutchinson, Kansas, listed on the NRHP in Reno County
- Wolcott House (Mission Hills, Kansas), listed on the NRHP in Johnson County
- Benajah Wolcott House, Lakeside-Marblehead, Ohio, listed on the NRHP in Ottawa County
- Hull-Wolcott House, Maumee, Ohio, listed on the NRHP in Lucas County
- Wolcott House (Northfield, Ohio), listed on the NRHP in Summit County

== See also ==
- Wolcott Historic District (disambiguation)
