= National Register of Historic Places listings in Johnson County, Kansas =

Location of Johnson County in Kansas

This is a list of the National Register of Historic Places listings in Johnson County, Kansas.

This is intended to be a complete list of the properties and districts on the National Register of Historic Places in Johnson County, Kansas, United States. The locations of National Register properties and districts for which the latitude and longitude coordinates are included below, may be seen in a map.

There are 36 properties and districts listed on the National Register in the county, including one National Historic Landmark.

This National Park Service list is complete through NPS recent listings posted October 23, 2026.

== Current listings ==
	Name on the Register	Image	Date listed	Location	City or town	Description
1	Blackfeather Farm		August 22, 1996 (#96000918)	8140 W. 183rd St. 38°47′54″N 94°40′53″W	Stilwell	
2	Broadmoor Ranch House Historic District	Broadmoor Ranch House Historic District	February 7, 2011 (#10001208)	6900-7017 W. 68th St., 6900-7001 W. 69th St., 6900-7019 W. 69th Terr. 39°00′15″N 94°39′59″W	Overland Park	
3	Campbell Dome House	Campbell Dome House	March 7, 2022 (#100007467)	8126 Hamilton Dr. 38°58′50″N 94°40′18″W	Overland Park	
4	Downtown Gardner Historic District		October 17, 2023 (#100009453)	102-107 South Elm St.; 130-218 Main St.; 204 East Park St. 38°48′40″N 94°55′30″W	Gardner	
5	Ensor Farm	Ensor Farm	February 27, 2004 (#04000079)	18995 W. 183rd St. 38°47′51″N 94°48′36″W	Olathe	
6	Herman B. Foster House	Herman B. Foster House	November 28, 2007 (#07001226)	204 W. Main St. 38°48′48″N 94°55′51″W	Gardner	
7	Louis & Rachel Hammer Barn		May 13, 2022 (#100007705)	33600 West 143rd St. 38°52′10″N 94°58′45″W	Gardner	
8	Harmon Park Swale		September 21, 2018 (#13000880)	7700 Mission Rd. 38°59′20″N 94°37′52″W	Prairie Village	
9	R.W. Hocker Subdivision, Lot K Spec House	R.W. Hocker Subdivision, Lot K Spec House	March 27, 2017 (#100000799)	5532 Knox Ave. 39°01′42″N 94°41′54″W	Merriam	
10	Horn-Vincent-Russell Estate	Horn-Vincent-Russell Estate	July 25, 1997 (#97000819)	6624 Wenonga Rd. 39°00′36″N 94°37′40″W	Mission Hills	
11	Lanesfield School	Lanesfield School	October 13, 1988 (#88001902)	18745 S. Dillie Rd. 38°47′22″N 94°59′33″W	Edgerton	
12	Franklin R. Lanter House	Franklin R. Lanter House	October 10, 2007 (#07001066)	562 W. Park St. 38°52′56″N 94°49′38″W	Olathe	
13	William and Julia LeCluyse House		October 4, 2021 (#100007023)	5810 Cody St. 39°01′25″N 94°43′18″W	Shawnee	
14	Lone Elm Campground Swale	Lone Elm Campground Swale	April 6, 2014 (#14000121)	21151 W. 167th St. 38°49′23″N 94°49′55″W	Olathe	Part of the Santa Fe Trail MPS
15	Loomis Historic District	Loomis Historic District	May 17, 2006 (#06000390)	8325 Johnson Dr., 5900 Hadley, 5923 Hadley; 39°01′25″N 94°40′53″W	Merriam	
16	J. B. Mahaffie House	J. B. Mahaffie House	August 29, 1977 (#77000583)	1100 Kansas City Rd. 38°53′31″N 94°48′04″W	Olathe	
17	John McCarthy House	John McCarthy House	July 10, 2000 (#00000758)	19700 Sunflower Rd. 38°46′14″N 95°00′07″W	Edgerton	
18	Mt. Pleasant Four Corners Burying Grounds		September 22, 2021 (#100007024)	Four Corners Rd. (east side) approx.. ½ mi. north of 167th St. 38°50′24″N 94°58′25″W	Gardner vicinity	
19	George L. Morrow Barn		January 8, 2024 (#100009711)	19810 South Hedge Lane; 38°46′10″N 94°51′12″W	Spring Hill	
20	Olathe Cemetery	Olathe Cemetery	January 11, 2017 (#100000514)	738 Chestnut St. 38°53′43″N 94°49′04″W	Olathe	
21	Albert Ott House	Albert Ott House	April 1, 1998 (#98000267)	401 S. Harrison St. 38°52′41″N 94°48′56″W	Olathe	
22	Overland Theater	Overland Theater	February 9, 2005 (#05000009)	7204 W. 80th St. 38°59′10″N 94°40′09″W	Overland Park	
23	Martin Van Buren Parker House	Martin Van Buren Parker House	December 20, 1988 (#88002829)	631 W. Park St. 38°52′58″N 94°49′48″W	Olathe	
24	I. O. Pickering House	I. O. Pickering House	December 1, 1980 (#80001468)	507 W. Park St. 38°53′01″N 94°49′28″W	Olathe	
25	Redel Historic District		August 16, 1996 (#96000897)	16310 Mission Rd., 3950, 3970, 3990, and 4010 W. 163rd St. 38°49′57″N 94°37′51″W	Stilwell	
26	Shawnee Grade School		October 19, 2026 (#100013542)	5705 Flint St. 39°01′30″N 94°43′05″W	Shawnee	
27	Shawnee Indian Cemetery		September 27, 2022 (#100008244)	10825 West 59th Terr. 39°01′16″N 94°42′44″W	Shawnee	
28	Shawnee Methodist Mission	Shawnee Methodist Mission	October 15, 1966 (#66000345)	53rd St. at Mission Rd. 39°02′00″N 94°37′29″W	Fairway	
29	Sunflower Village Historic District		November 18, 2014 (#14000929)	36000 103rd St. 38°56′43″N 95°00′11″W	DeSoto	
30	William Thomas Turner Barn	William Thomas Turner Barn	April 1, 1999 (#99000420)	19805 S. Moonlight Rd. 38°46′11″N 94°54′28″W	Gardner	
31	Virginia School District No. 33	Virginia School District No. 33	May 19, 2004 (#04000454)	7301 Mize Road; 38°59′46″N 94°52′52″W	Shawnee	Relocated in 2007
32	Herman J. and Ella B. Voigts House	Herman J. and Ella B. Voigts House	May 18, 1995 (#95000603)	2405 W. 103rd St. 38°56′31″N 94°37′09″W	Leawood	
33	Walker School		June 4, 2026 (#100011170)	9420 W. 50th Terr; 39°02′17″N 94°41′44″W	Merriam	
34	Westwood Hills Historic District	Westwood Hills Historic District	December 4, 2013 (#13000816)	Bounded by State Line Rd., W. 50th St. Terr., Rainbow Blvd., N. side of W. 48th St. Terr. 39°02′21″N 94°36′35″W	Westwood Hills	
35	Wolcott House	Wolcott House	May 2, 2001 (#01000448)	5701 Oakwood Rd. 39°01′30″N 94°36′43″W	Mission Hills	
36	WPA Beach House at Gardner Lake	WPA Beach House at Gardner Lake	June 25, 1992 (#92000826)	Western shore of Gardner Lake, north of Gardner; 38°50′55″N 94°55′43″W	Gardner	

== See also ==
- List of National Historic Landmarks in Kansas
- National Register of Historic Places listings in Kansas
