= Wolcott Historic District =

Wolcott Historic District may refer to:

- Wolcott Green Historic District, Wolcott, Connecticut, listed on the National Register of Historic Places (NRHP)
- Wolcott Square Historic District, Wolcott, New York, NRHP-listed
- South Wolcott Street Historic District, Casper, Wyoming, NRHP-listed

== See also ==
- Wolcott House (disambiguation)
