= Campbell Dome House =

- U.S. National Register of Historic Places
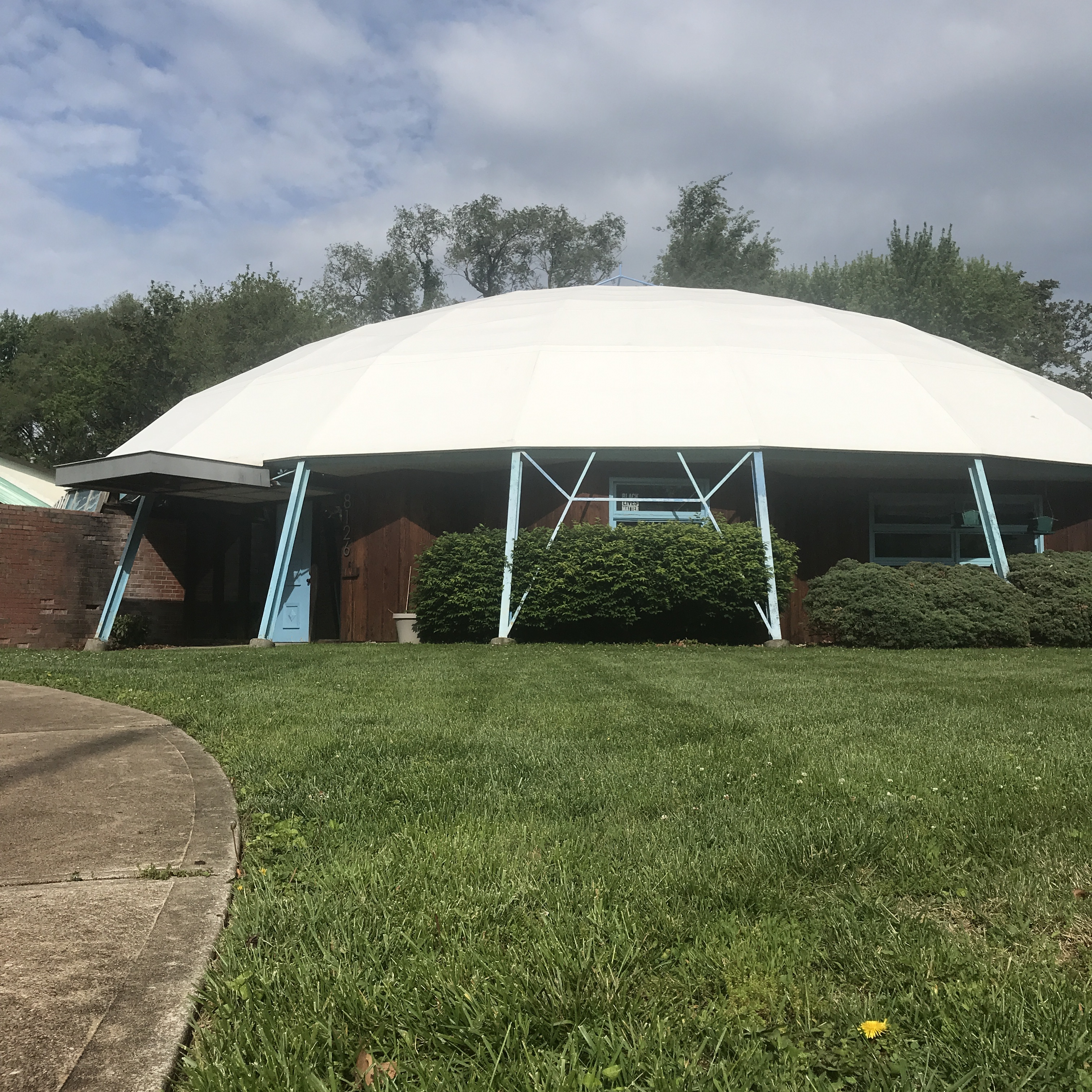

- Location within Kansas Location within the United States
- Location: 8126 Hamilton Drive, Overland Park, Kansas
- Coordinates: 38°58′49″N 94°40′18″W
- Built: 1967–1968
- Architectural style: Mid-Century Modern
- NRHP reference No.: 100007467
- Added to NRHP: March 7, 2022

The Campbell Dome House is a historic, mid-century modern home located at 8126 Hamilton Drive in Overland Park, Kansas. Bob D. Campbell, a civil engineer, set out to design a residence beneath a dome for his family, who were originally from South Texas, so that they could enjoy the "outdoors" all year. Campbell chose to use a Schwedler dome, which consists of meridional ribs connected to a number of horizontal polygonal rings, to accomplish this. He believed that incorporating domes into home design offered significant advantages and that the design represented the future of architecture as domes offered more space while using less material. Construction on the home began in 1967 and was finished in 1968.

The 80-foot-diameter dome covers a U-shaped three-bedroom house that opens to a covered south-facing tropical courtyard with a 25-foot rubber tree, an in-ground pool, and banana and avocado trees. Campbell and his wife left the home to their children after they died, who turned the dome into an event space. The home was added to the National Register of Historic Places on March 7, 2022.

== See also ==
- National Register of Historic Places listings in Johnson County, Kansas
