= Pickering Operations Complex =

Office skyscraper in Singapore

- 必麒麟運作大廈
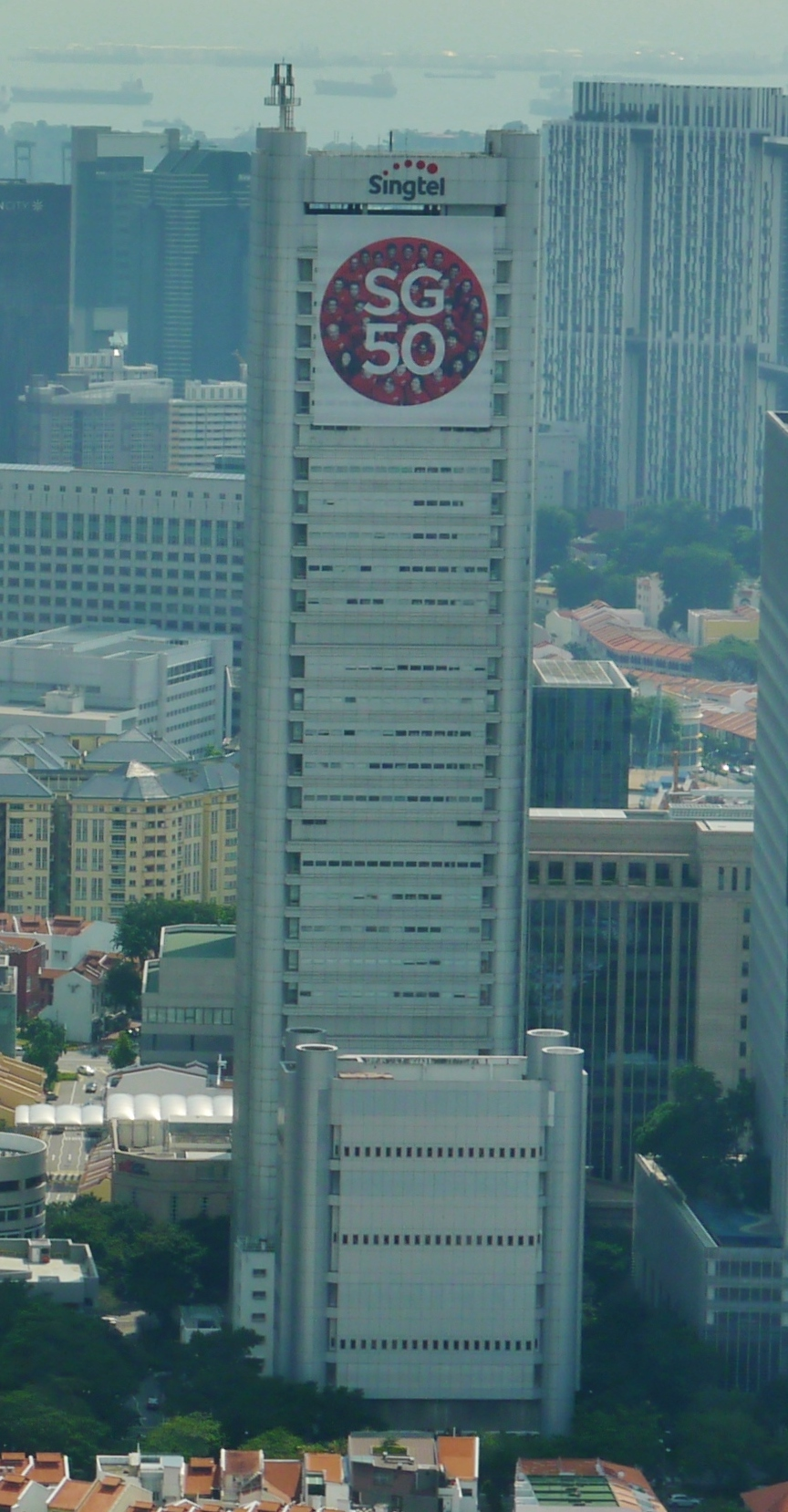
- Pickering Operations Complex in 2015
- Interactive map of the Pickering Operations Complex area
- Alternative names: City Telecoms Centre, Pickering Operation Centre, Singapore Telecom, SingTel

General information
- Status: Completed
- Type: Commercial offices
- Architectural style: Modernism
- Location: Raffles Place, Downtown Core, Singapore
- Coordinates: 1.285201°N 103.848266°E
- Owner: Singtel

Height
- Roof: 177 m (581 ft)

Technical details
- Floor count: 43; 2 basements

Design and construction
- Architect: Kenzo Tange Associates

The Pickering Operations Complex is a 177 m (581 ft) skyscraper at 20 Pickering Street, in Raffles Place in the central business district of Singapore. The tower is situated adjacent to OCBC Centre and One George Street.

== History ==
Pickering Operations Complex was designed by Kenzo Tange Associates, and was completed in 1986. Other companies involved in the development of Pickering Operations Complex included Singapore Telecommunications Limited, Meinhardt (Singapore) Private Limited, Meinhardt (Singapore) Private Limited, and Meinhardt (Singapore) Private Limited.

== Architecture ==
Pickering Operations Complex is mainly made out of reinforced concrete. The architecture of the building bears much similarity to OCBC Centre, which was completed one decade earlier. In fact, the OCBC centre is situated just next to Pickering Operations Complex.

== Facilities and equipment ==
Designed as a Telecom hotel or co-location facility, Pickering Operations Complex naturally has many technical equipment that cater to telecommunications. There are two "technical floors" in the building, the 5th and the 29th floor. The tower is one of many buildings and trunk exchange centres that belong to Singtel. However, it is Singtel's only building that is in the central business district, Raffles Place.

The building uses the SAUTER EY3600 building management system, which is equipped with the SAUTER novaPro Open management level. The automation stations of the nova family, monitors and controls the mechanical ventilation for the air conditioning system and the lighting. The fire-alarm system, the lifts, the lowvoltage system, the emergency power system and the sanitary facilities are also monitored and controlled by the SAUTER EY3600.

=== Technical equipment ===
The building's technical equipment comprises:

- 8 refrigeration plants, each with a capacity of 300 tons
- 24 air-handling units
- 14 fan-coil units
- 16 control centres on various floors
- 77 air-conditioning systems for the EDP rooms

== See also ==
- List of tallest buildings in Singapore
