= Albert Ott House =

Historic house in Kansas, United States

- U.S. National Register of Historic Places
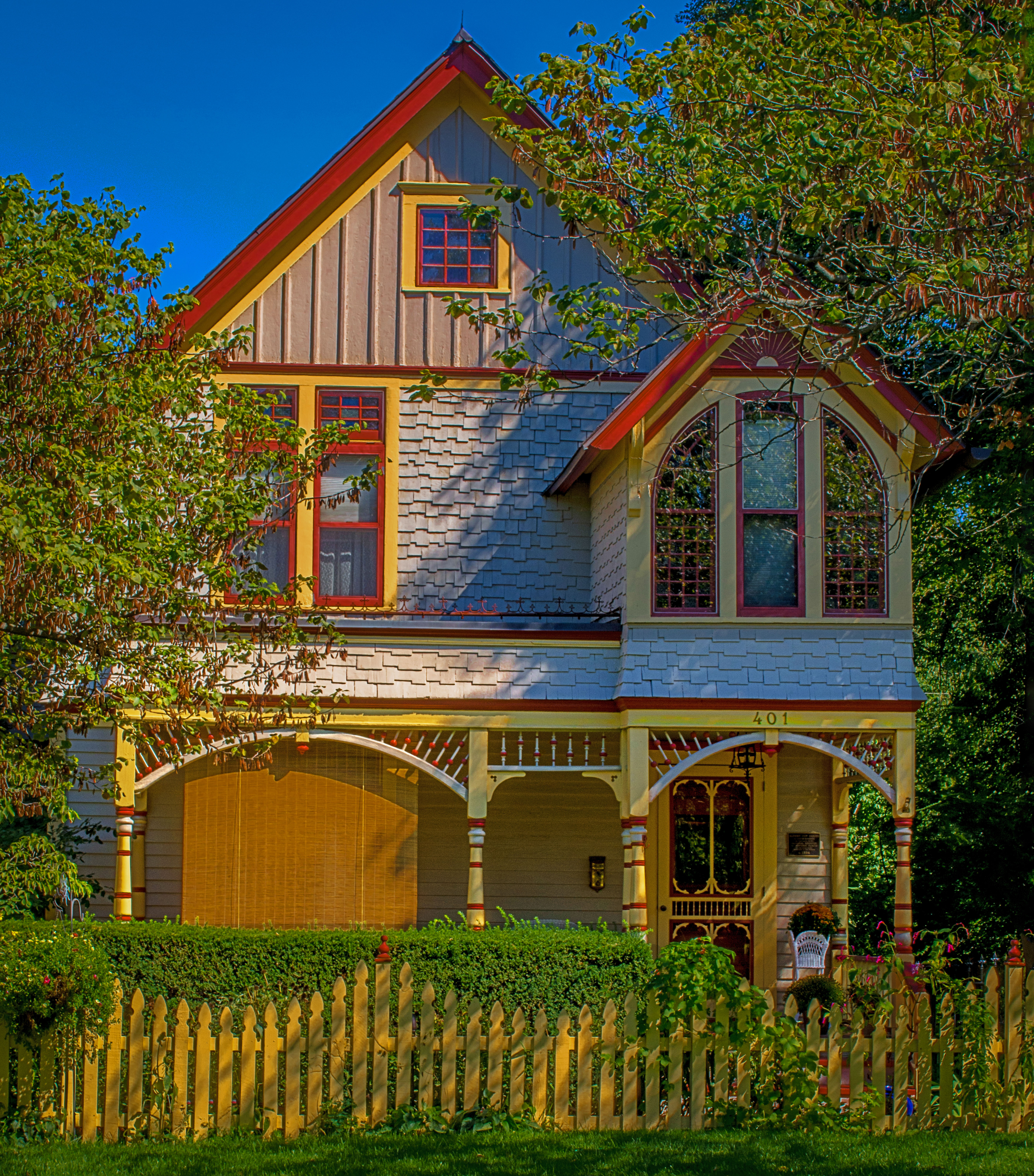
- The Albert Ott House in 2013

- Location within Kansas Location within the United States
- Location: 401 South Harrison Street, Olathe, Kansas
- Coordinates: 38°52′41″N 94°48′56″W
- Area: less than one acre
- Built: 1894
- Architectural style: Queen Anne
- NRHP reference No.: 98000267
- Added to NRHP: April 1, 1998

The Albert Ott House is a historic house in Olathe, Kansas, U.S.. It was built in 1894 for Albert Ott, the president of the Olathe State Bank, and his wife Helena Hyer, whose brother founded the Hyer Boot Company. It was designed in the Queen Anne architectural style. It has been listed on the National Register of Historic Places since April 1, 1998.
