= Pickering House =

Pickering House may refer to:

- I. O. Pickering House, Olathe, Kansas
- Pickering House (Salem, Massachusetts), NRHP-listed
- Pickering House (Victoria, Texas), NRHP-listed
- Pickering Farm, Issaquah, Washington

== See also ==
- Adams-Pickering Block, Bangor, Maine, NRHP-listed
- Fort Pickering, Salem, Massachusetts, NRHP-listed
- Middle Pickering Rural Historic District, Phoenixville, Pennsylvania
