= Martin Van Buren Parker House =

Historic house in Kansas, United States

- U.S. National Register of Historic Places
- The Martin Van Buren Parker House in 2013

- Location within Kansas Location within the United States
- Location: 631 W. Park, Olathe, Kansas
- Coordinates: 38°52′58″N 94°49′48″W
- Area: less than one acre
- Built: 1869
- Architectural style: Stick/eastlake, Eastern Stick
- NRHP reference No.: 88002829
- Added to NRHP: December 20, 1988

The Martin Van Buren Parker House is a historic house in Olathe, Kansas, U.S.. It was built in 1869 for Martin Van Buren Parker, a lawyer, his wife Emma, and their five children. Emma's brother was John St. John, who went on to serve as the 8th Governor of Kansas from 1879 to 1883. It remained in the Parker family until 1960, and it was restored by the new owners in the 1980s. It has been listed on the National Register of Historic Places since December 20, 1988.
