= Kenzō Tange =

Japanese architect (1913–2005)

- 丹下健三
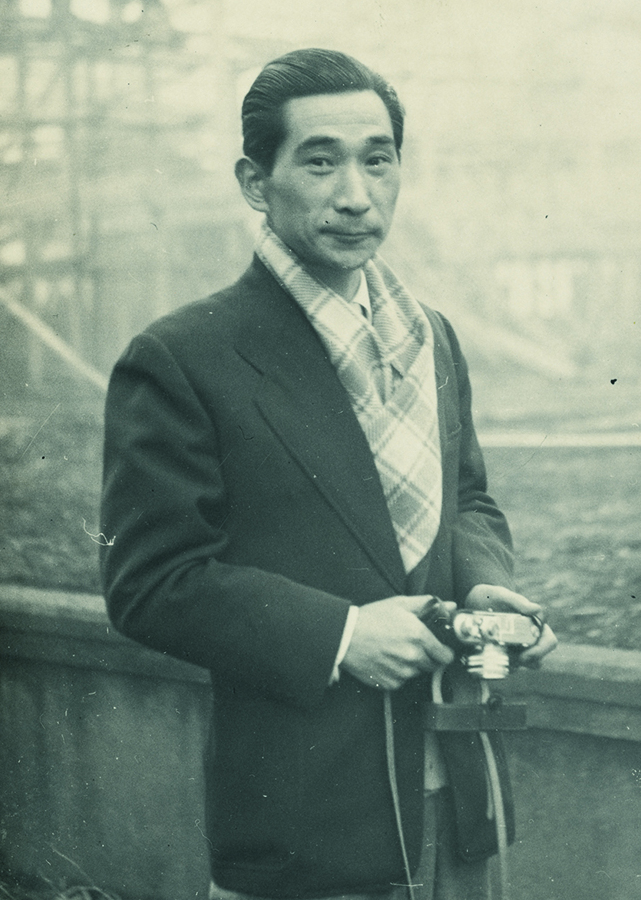
- Tange in 1953
- Born: 4 September 1913; Sakai, Japan
- Died: 22 March 2005 (aged 91); Tokyo, Japan
- Education: University of Tokyo
- Occupation: Architect
- Children: Paul Noritaka Tange
- Awards: Pritzker Prize; Royal Gold Medal; AIA Gold Medal; Order of Culture; Order of the Sacred Treasure; Praemium Imperiale; Order of St. Gregory the Great
- Practice: Tange Laboratory (1946–1961); Kenzo Tange Urban and Architectural Design Institute; Tange Associates
- Buildings: Hiroshima Peace Memorial Park; Tokyo Cathedral; Yoyogi National Gymnasium; Minneapolis Institute of Art Expansion; Tokyo Metropolitan Government Building; UOB Plaza; One Raffles Place; Supreme Court of Pakistan Building

Kenzō Tange (丹下 健三, Tange Kenzō; 4 September 1913 – 22 March 2005) was a Japanese architect. Born in Sakai and raised in China and southern Japan, Tange was inspired from an early age by the work of Le Corbusier and designed his first buildings under Imperial Japan. He first achieved recognition for his projects to reconstruct the destroyed cities of postwar Japan, particularly Hiroshima, where he designed the Hiroshima Peace Memorial Park. His engagement with the Congres Internationaux d'Architecture Moderne in the 1950s made him one of the first Japanese architects to achieve international recognition.

Renowned for synthesizing traditional Japanese styles with modernism, Tange's work was emblematic of the Japanese postwar boom. However, he built major projects on five continents. He was a forerunner, mentor, and patron of the metabolist movement. He was also known as an ambitious, original urban planner whose ideas inspired the reconstruction of cities including Skopje. Tange would continue designing buildings until his death in 2005.

Tange won awards for his contributions to architecture, including the Royal Gold Medal in 1965, the AIA Gold Medal in 1966, the Praemium Imperiale for Architecture in 1993, and the Pritzker Prize, the "Nobel Prize of architecture", in 1987.

== Early life and education ==
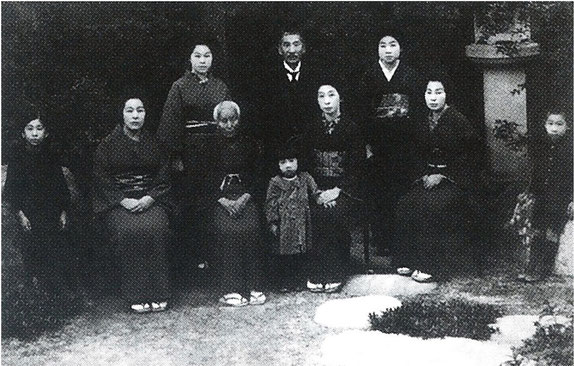
Kenzō (right) with his family upon their return to Japan (1921)

Born on 4 September 1913 in Sakai, Japan, Tange spent his early life in the Chinese cities of Hankou and Shanghai; he and his family returned to Japan after learning of the death of one of his uncles. In contrast to the green lawns and red bricks in their Shanghai abode, the Tange family took up residence in a thatched roof farmhouse in Imabari on the island of Shikoku.

After finishing middle school, Tange moved to Hiroshima in 1930 to attend high school. It was here that he first encountered the works of Swiss modernist, Le Corbusier. His discovery of the drawings of the Palace of the Soviets in a foreign art journal convinced him to become an architect. Although he graduated from high school, Tange's poor results in mathematics and physics meant that he had to pass entrance exams to qualify for admission to the prestigious universities. He spent two years doing so and during that time, he read extensively about western philosophy. Tange also enrolled in the film division at Nihon University's art department to avoid Japan's drafting of young men to its military and seldom attended classes.

In 1935 Tange began the tertiary studies he desired at the University of Tokyo's architecture department. He studied under Hideto Kishida and Yoshikazu Uchida. Although Tange was fascinated by the photographs of the Katsura villa that sat on Kishida's desk, his work was inspired by Le Corbusier. His graduation project was a seventeen-hectare (42-acre) development set in Tokyo's Hibiya Park.

== Early career ==
After graduating from the university, Tange started to work as an architect at the office of Kunio Maekawa. During his employment, he travelled to Manchuria, participating in an architectural design competition for a bank, and toured Japanese-occupied Rehe on his return. When the Second World War started, he left Maekawa to rejoin the University of Tokyo as a postgraduate student. He developed an interest in urban design, and referencing only the resources available in the university library, he embarked on a study of Greek and Roman marketplaces.

His career would begin in earnest by winning a string of national competitions. In 1941, he won the People's House Design Competition. In 1942, Tange entered a competition for the design of the Greater East Asia Co-Prosperity Sphere Memorial Hall. He was awarded first prize for a design that would have been situated at the base of Mount Fuji; the hall he conceived was a fusion of Shinto shrine architecture and the plaza on Capitoline Hill in Rome. In 1943, he won the competition for Japan-Thai Cultural Hall. None of his winning designs were realised. However, Tange's earliest work represents active engagement with the nationalist paradigms of Japanese imperial architecture. In response to a 1942 questionnaire regarding his views on style and architectural policy for the Greater East Asia Co-Prosperity Sphere, he stated: "We must ignore both Anglo-American culture and the pre-existing cultures of the Southeast Asian Races. [...] We should start out with an unshakable conviction in the tradition and the future of the Japanese races."

Tange's pre-1945 success was a clear liability in the immediate postwar years, and was rarely noted by critics until the 1960s. Although his postwar style departed from his nationalistic early work, scholars have nonetheless identified continuities in Tange's early and later work, specifically in his aims to formulate a distinctly Japanese iteration of modern architecture.

In 1946, Tange became an assistant professor at the University of Tokyo. In 1962, he opened the Urban Design Laboratory, and was promoted to professor of the Department of Urban Engineering in 1963. His students included Sachio Otani, Kisho Kurokawa, Arata Isozaki, Hajime Yatsuka and Fumihiko Maki.

== Selected projects ==
=== Postwar Reconstruction and Hiroshima Peace Memorial ===
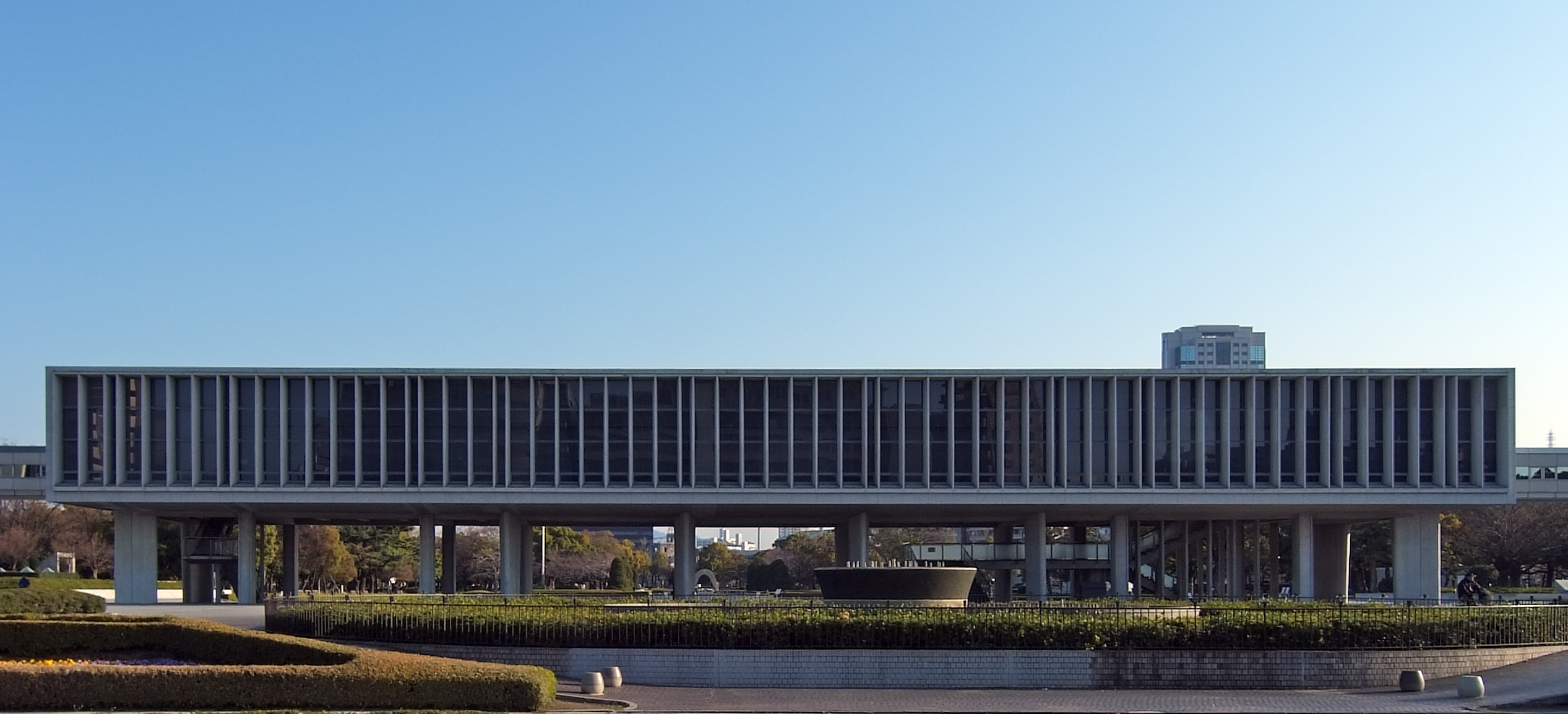
Hiroshima Peace Memorial Museum, view along axis (1955)

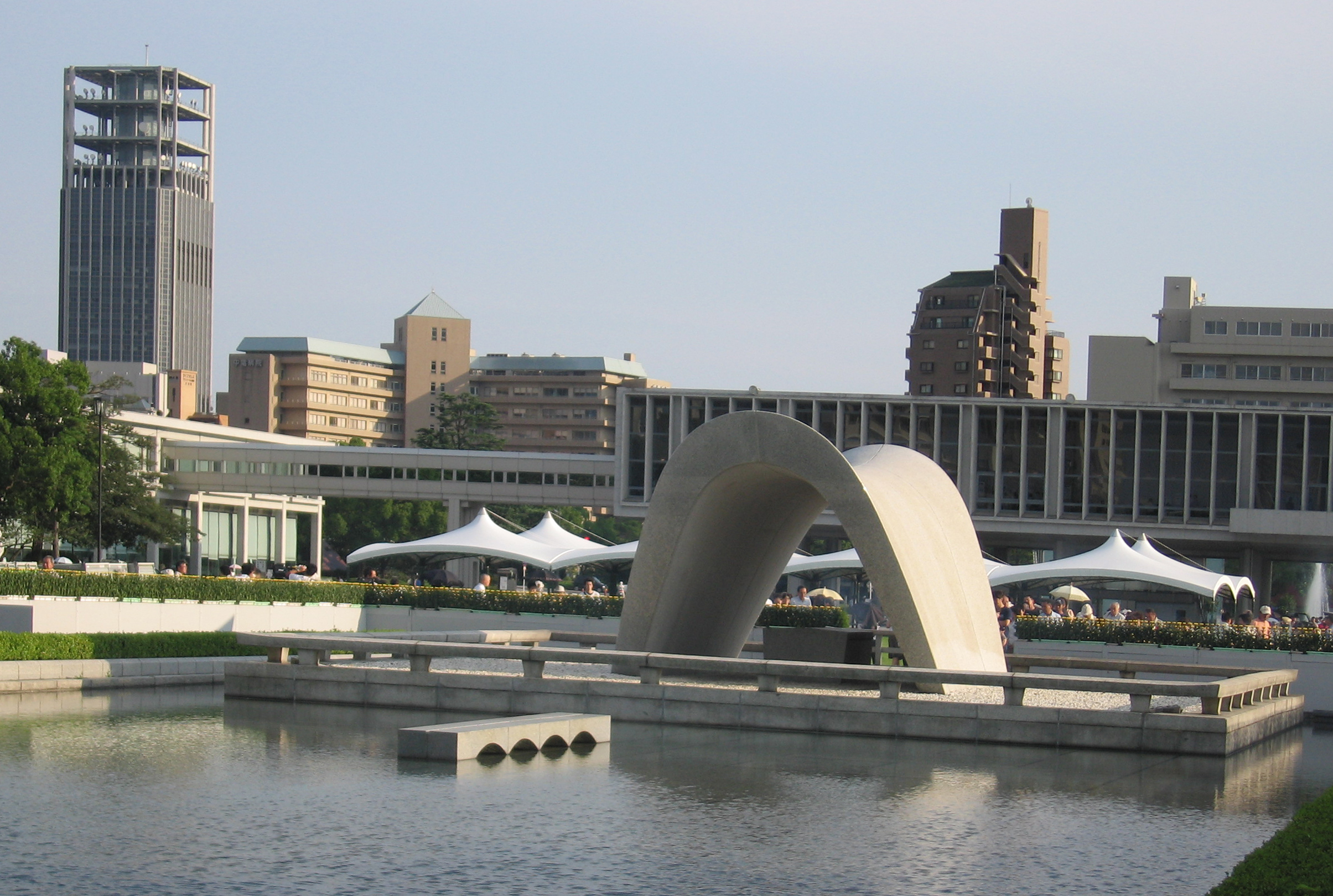
Cenotaph, Hiroshima Peace Memorial Park, Japan

Tange's interest in urban studies put him in a good position to handle post war reconstruction. In the summer of 1946 he was invited by the War Damage Rehabilitation Board to put forward a proposal for certain war damaged cities. He submitted plans for Hiroshima and Maebashi. His design for an airport in Kanon, Hiroshima was accepted and built, but a seaside park in Ujina was not.

The Hiroshima authorities took advice about the city's reconstruction from foreign consultants, and in 1947 Tam Deling, an American park planner, suggested they build a Peace Memorial and preserve buildings situated near ground zero, that point directly below the explosion of the atomic bomb. In 1949 the authorities enacted the Hiroshima Peace Memorial Reconstruction Act, which gave the city access to special grant aid, and in August 1949, an international competition was announced for the design of the Hiroshima Peace Memorial Park.

Tange was awarded first prize for a design that proposed a museum whose axis runs through the park, intersecting Peace Boulevard and the atomic bomb dome. The building is raised on massive columns, which frame the view along the structure's axis.

Work on the Peace Center commenced in 1950. In addition to the axial nature of the design, the layout is similar to Tange's early competition arrangement for the Greater East Asia Co-Prosperity Sphere Memorial Hall.

In the initial design the Hiroshima Peace Memorial Museum was dominated by adjoining utility buildings, which were linked to it by high-level walkways. Tange refined this concept to place the museum prominently at the centre, separate from the utility buildings (only one of which was subsequently designed by him). In addition to architectural symbolism, he thought it important for the design to centre around the building that houses the information about the atomic explosion.

The museum is constructed from bare reinforced concrete. The primary museum floor is lifted six metres above the ground on huge piloti and is accessible via a free-standing staircase. The rhythmical facade comprises vertical elements that repeat outwards from the centre. Like the exterior, the interior is finished with rough concrete; the idea was to keep the surfaces plain so that nothing could distract the visitor from the contents of the exhibits.

The Peace Plaza is the backdrop for the museum. The plaza was designed to allow 50 thousand people to gather around the peace monument in the centre. Tange also designed the Cenotaph monument as an arch composed of two hyperbolic paraboloids, said to be based on traditional Japanese ceremonial tombs from the Kofun Period.

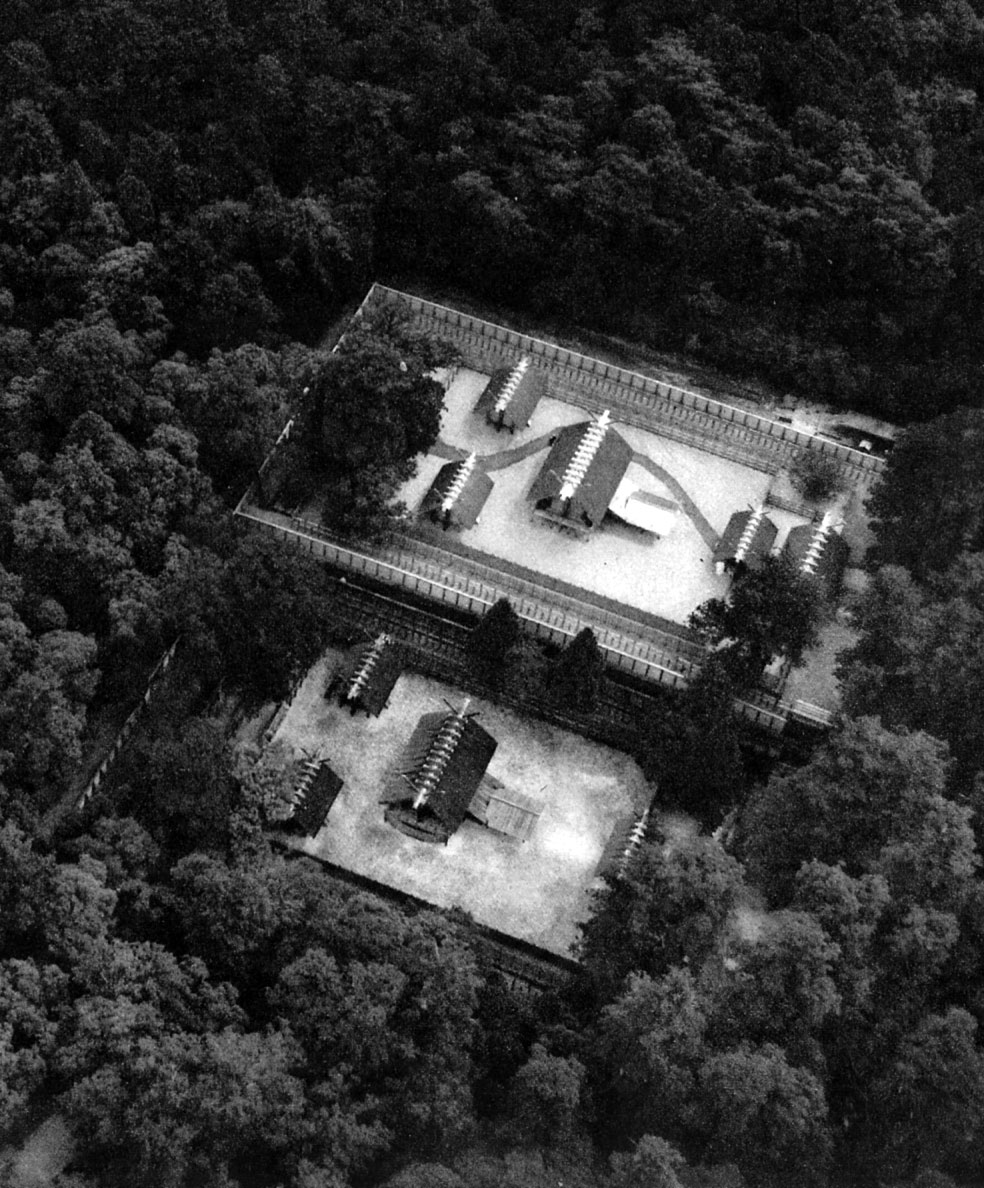
Ise Shrine in 1953: the new building (above) is an exact copy of the old one built 20 years earlier.

=== Ise Shrine ===
In 1953, Tange and architectural journalist and critic Noboru Kawazoe were invited to attend the reconstruction of the Ise Grand Shrine. The shrine is rebuilt every 20 years, and in 1953, it marked the 59th iteration of this tradition, which began in 690 by the order of Emperor Temmu. Normally the reconstruction process was a very closed affair but this time the ceremony was opened to architects and journalists to document the event. The ceremony coincided with the end of the American Occupation and it seemed to symbolise a new start in Japanese architecture. In 1965 when Tange and Kawazoe published the book Ise: Prototype of Japanese Architecture, he likened the building to a modernist structure: an honest expression of materials, a functional design and prefabricated elements.

=== Kagawa Prefectural Government Hall ===
The Kagawa Prefectural Government Hall on the island of Shikoku was completed in 1958. Its expressive construction could be likened to the Daibutsu style seen at the Tōdai-ji in Nara. The columns on the elevation bore only vertical loads so Tange was able to design them to be thin, maximising the surfaces for glazing. Although the hall has been called one of his finest projects, it drew criticism at the time of its construction for relying too heavily on tradition.

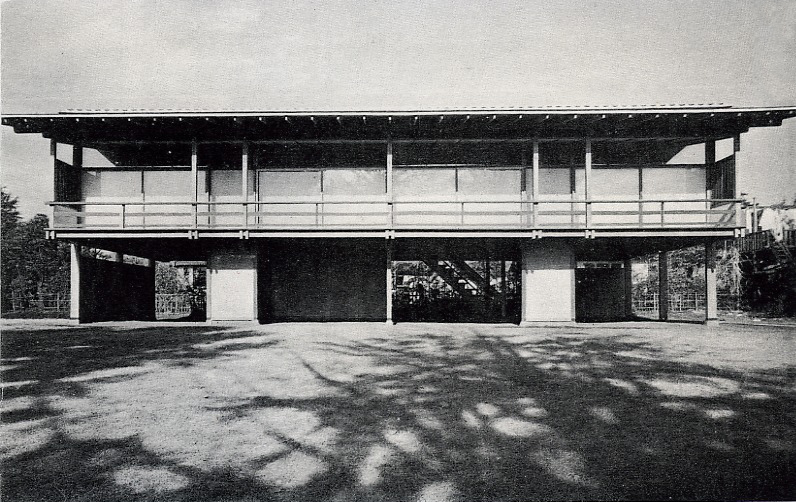
Kenzō Tange's own house (1953)

=== Tange's own home ===
Tange's own home, designed in 1951 and completed in 1953, uses a similar skeleton structure raised off the ground as the Hiroshima Peace Museum; however, it is fused with a more traditional Japanese design that uses timber and paper. The house is based on the traditional Japanese module of the tatami mat, with the largest rooms designed to have flexibility so that they can be separated into three smaller rooms by fusuma sliding doors. The facade is designed with a rhythmic pattern; it comprises two types of facade designs ("a" and "b") that are ordered laterally in an a-b-a-a-b-a arrangement. The house is topped with a two-tier roof. Kazuo Shinohara's 1954 house at Kugayama is remarkably similar in its design, although it is built with steel and has a simpler rhythm in its facade.

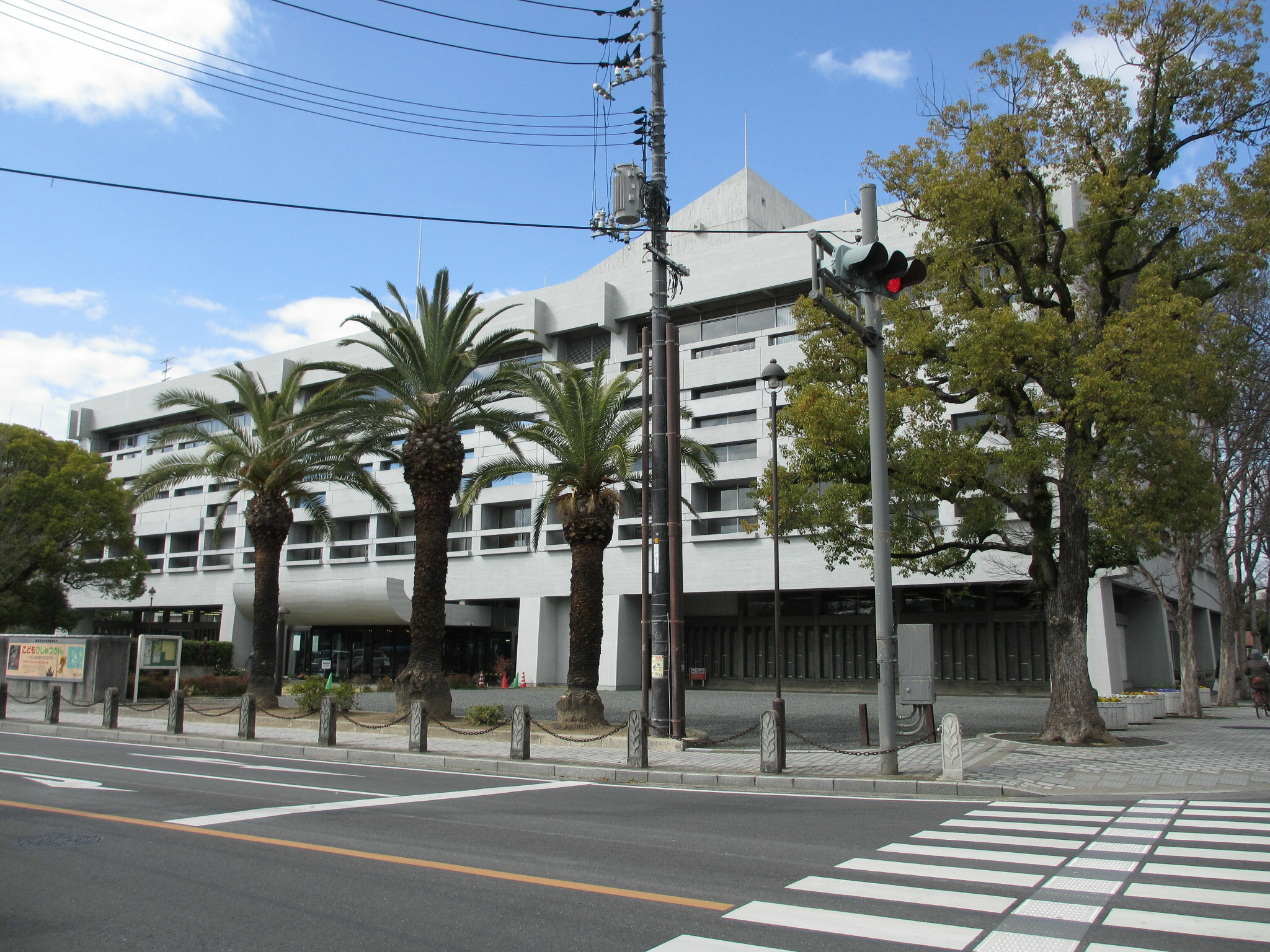
Kurashiki City Hall, now used as the Kurashiki Art Museum

=== Town Hall, Kurashiki ===
The fortress-like town hall in Kurashiki was designed in 1958 and completed in 1960. When it was constructed it was situated on the edge of the old town centre connecting it with the newer areas of the town. Kurashiki is better known as a tourist spot for its old Machiya style houses.

Set in an open square, the building sits on massive columns that taper inwards as they rise. The elevation consists of horizontal planks (some of which are omitted to create windows) which overlap at the corners in a "log cabin" effect. The entrance is covered with a heavy projecting concrete canopy which leads to a monumental entrance hall. The stair to this hall ascends in cantilevered straight flights to the left and right. The walls to this interior are bare shuttered concrete punctured by windows reminiscent of Le Corbusier's La Tourette. The Council Chamber is a separate building whose raked roof has seating on top of it to form an external performance space.

=== Tokyo Bay Plan ===
Tokyo experienced a massive population boom in the postwar years, putting significant strain on existing urban infrastructure. The municipal government responded by establishing the National Capital Construction Committee in 1951, which focused on decentralization as a prime method to relieve population pressures. In 1958, the committee released the National Capital Region Development Plan (NCRDP), which called for the establishment of multiple satellite cities and subcentres and the development of a greenbelt around Central Tokyo, in emulation of Patrick Abercrombie's 1944 Greater London Plan.

Tange and the nascent Metabolists sought to produce a response to the NCRDP which recognized the fundamental ways in which they believed the automobile had changed urban development and life. Tange's plan, published in 1960 at the Tokyo venue of the World Design Congress, completely bypassed the existing infrastructure of Tokyo and called for a radical new development pattern centered on a massive megastructure spanning Tokyo Bay. Tange believed that modern "pivotal" megacities such as Tokyo had their economic basis in the tertiary sector, and that, accordingly, conventional modern urban planning based on the separation of different functional "zones" was no longer useful. Believing that the city's vitality was grounded in the very movement of its then-10 million inhabitants, the Tokyo Bay megastructure was designed as an "arterial structure" to enhance the mobility of the city.

Taking inspiration from Le Corbusier's earlier Ville Radieuse, the Tokyo Bay plan emphasized the separation of pedestrians and vehicles, and the creation of an integrated system of architecture and highways which would encourage linear development and constant mobility. The project, at least in its first planned stage, would stretch 18 km from downtown Tokyo across the bay to Chiba, and be ripe for expansion with the city's population.

The ambitious plan was never implemented, although it generated considerable interest. Peter Smithson, who, along with his wife Alice, regularly engaged with Tange, admitted the ingenuity of the plan, but denied its feasibility and disputed Tange's ideal of linear growth. Christopher Alexander, writing in 1965, viewed the plan as a "beautiful" example of a "tree city" which was wholly incapable of meeting the basic necessities of human organization (Alexander personally was a proponent of a "semi-lattice" model of urban growth).

The plan nonetheless introduced significant, new ideas into the contemporary urban-planning discourse, and initiated a "megastructure movement". It also served as a significant inspiration for his work in the next few years: the Yamanashi Communication Center in Kofu and his plan for Skopje both encapsulated his ideal of the "city as process".

=== Tokyo Olympic arenas ===
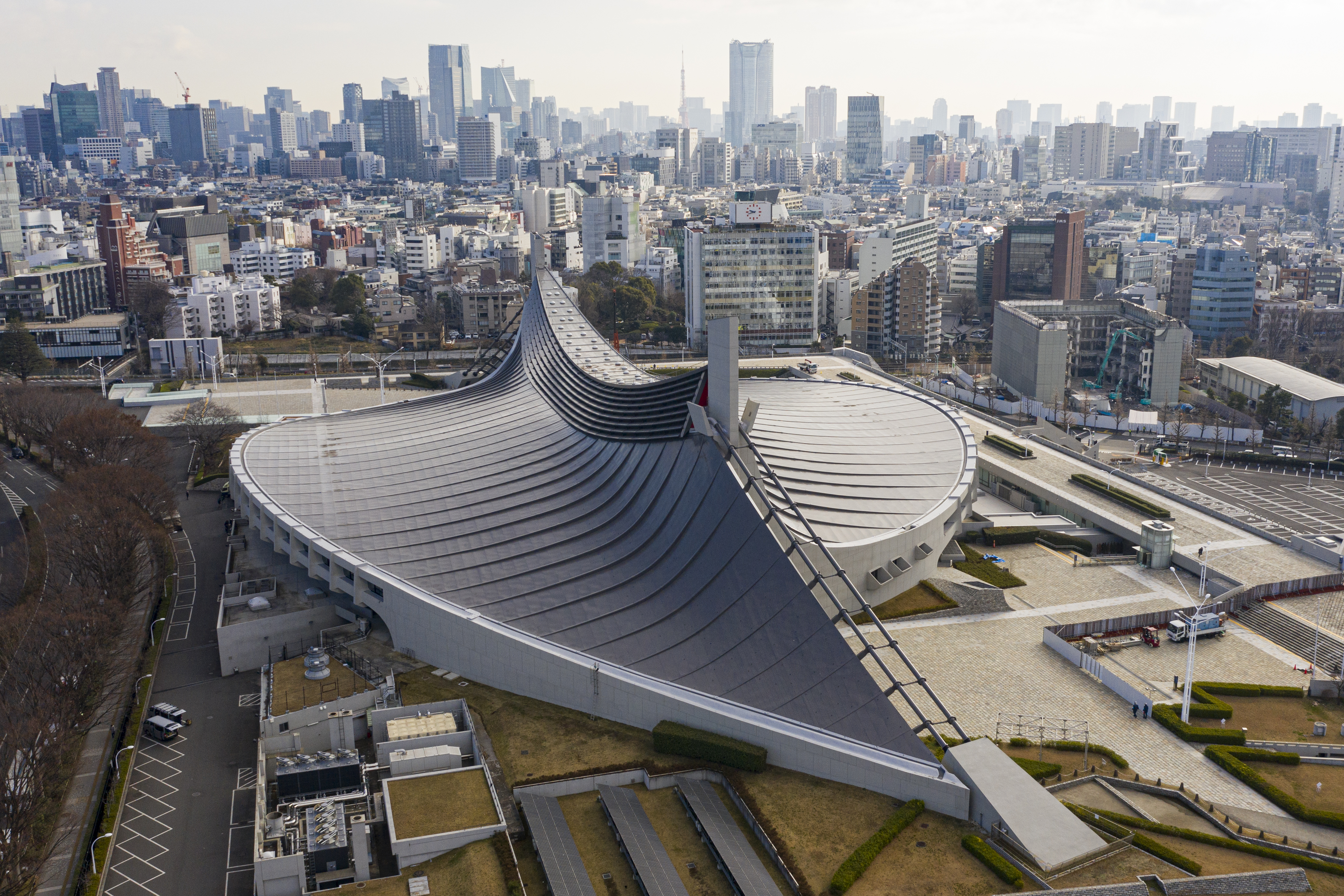
Yoyogi National Gymnasium (1964)

The Yoyogi National Gymnasium is situated in an open area in Yoyogi Park on an adjacent axis to the Meiji Shrine. The gymnasium and swimming pool were designed by Tange for the 1964 Tokyo Olympics, which were the first Olympics held in Asia. Tange began his designs in 1961 and the plans were approved by the Ministry of Education in January 1963. The buildings were placed to optimize space available for parking and to permit the smoothest transition of incoming and outgoing people.

Inspired by the skyline of the Colosseum in Rome, the roofs have a skin suspended from two masts. The buildings were inspired by Le Corbusier's Philips Pavilion designed for Brussels' World Fair, and the Ingalls Rink, Yale University's hockey area, by Eero Saarinen (both structures were completed in 1958). The roof of the Philips Pavilion was created by complex hyperbolic paraboloid surfaces stretched between cables. In both cases Tange took Western ideas and adapted them to meet Japanese requirements.

The gymnasium has a capacity of approximately 16,000 and the smaller building can accommodate up to 5,300 depending on the events that are taking place. At the time it was built, the gymnasium had the world's largest suspended roof span. Two reinforced concrete pillars support a pre-stressed steel net onto which steel plates are attached. The bottom anchoring of this steel net is a heavy concrete support system which forms a distinct curve on the interior and exterior of the building. In the interior, this structural anchor is used to support the grandstand seats. The overall curvature of the roof helps protect the building from the damaging effects of strong winds.

Tange won a Pritzker Prize for the design; the citation described the gymnasium as "among the most beautiful buildings of the 20th century".

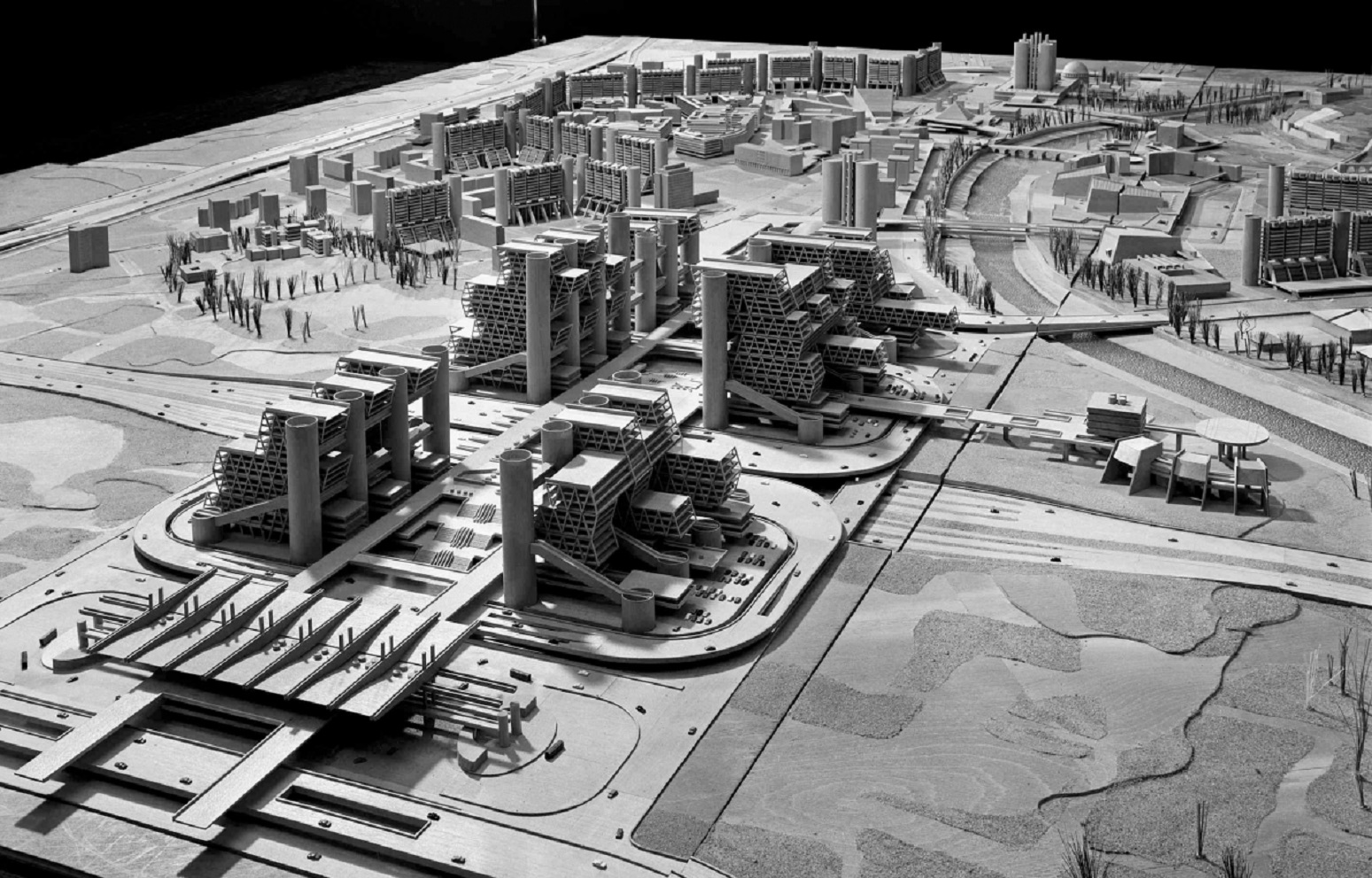
Plan for the reconstruction of Skopje, 1963

=== Plan for Skopje ===
The reconstruction plan of the capital city of Skopje, then part of the Yugoslav Republic of Macedonia following a major earthquake was won by Tange's architecture team in 1965. The project was significant because of its international influence, however for Tange it was model case for urban reconstruction to realise modern architecture principles. It is the first time that a Japanese architect was invited by an international body to participate in an urban development of this scale.

=== Supreme Court Building of Pakistan ===
The Supreme Court Building, Islamabad

The Supreme Court of Pakistan Building is the official and principal workplace of the Supreme Court of Pakistan, located in 44000 Constitution Avenue Islamabad, Pakistan. Construction on the building began in the 1960s, but it was only completed in 1993, it is flanked by the Prime Minister's Secretariat to the south and President's House and the Parliament Building to the north.

Designed by Tange, to a design brief prepared by the PEPAC, the complex was engineered and built by CDA Engineering and Siemens Engineering.

=== Yamanashi Press and Broadcasting Centre ===
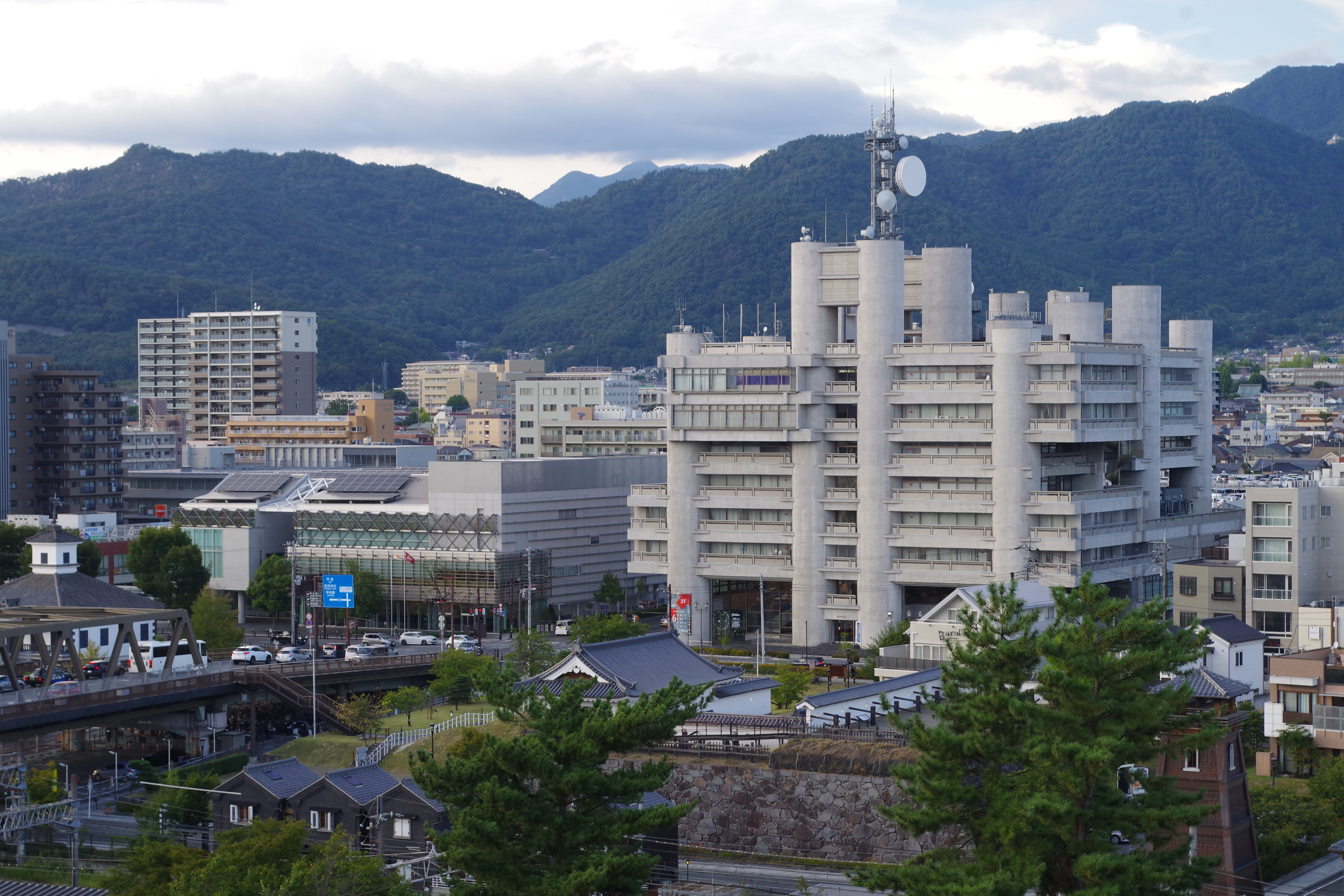
The Press and Broadcasting Centre in its urban setting

Tange was commissioned to build a communications centre in Kōfu in 1961. In 1966, the Yamanashi Press and Broadcasting Centre, a building which would serve as the headquarters for the Yamanashi Broadcasting System and house several of its divisions, including studios for radio and television and printing presses for a newspaper, was completed. The Press and Broadcasting Centre was one of the few opportunities Tange had to fully implement his Metabolist ideals of constant movement and expansion, albeit at a small scale.

The building grows out of sixteen towers, all five metres in diameter but varying in height, which carry vertical circulation and services including stairs and lifts. They are spanned by large, horizontal floor trays, which house the activities performed in the building. The plan of the building emphasised possibilities for continuous modification and growth by omitting some floor plates, which have since been filled in with gardens, and by the possibility for modifications around the sixteen towers which house essential circulation and services. Originally, the cafeteria and some public-facing services were situated on the ground floor, while the newspaper, TV Broadcasting, and radio divisions were situated on the third, sixth, and eighth floors, respectively. Offices in the building had glass walled floors and were surrounded by balconies. At least conceptually, the building was designed to expand with the company and even incorporate cars, although this has not come to fruition.

The Press and Broadcasting Centre is one of the few actually built expressions of Metabolist architecture, along with Kisho Kurokawa's now-demolished Nagakin Capsule Tower. The building continues to dominate its surroundings, however, critics have stated that the building has long diverged from its original ideals, and several redesign proposals have been submitted.

=== Osaka Exposition 1970 ===
In 1965 the Bureau International des Expositions decided that Japan should host the 1970 Exposition. 3.3 square kilometres (1.3 sq mi) of land in the Senri Hills near Osaka were put aside for its use. Tange and Uzo Nishiyama were appointed as planners for the masterplan by the Theme Committee. Tange assembled a group of twelve architects to design the infrastructure and facilities for the Expo.

At the centre of the Expo was the Festival Plaza. Tange conceived that this plaza (with its oversailing space frame roof) would connect the display spaces and create a setting for a "festival". The plaza divided the site into a northern zone for pavilions and a southern zone for administration facilities. The zones were interconnected with moving pathways.

=== Singapore ===
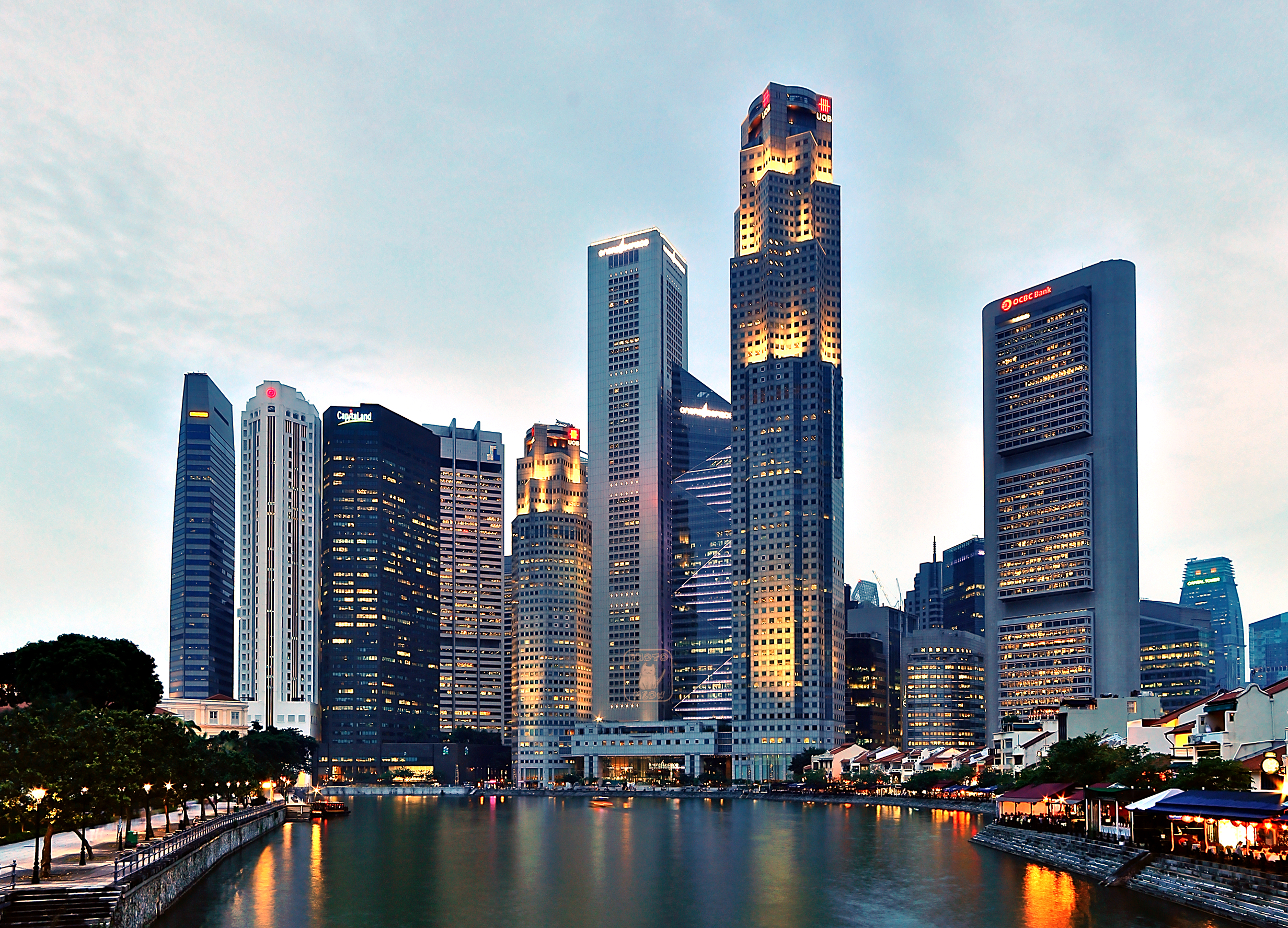
Singapore CBD from Elgin Bridge: One Raffles Place and UOB Plaza dominate the skyline.

In 1970, he became acquainted with Lee Kuan Yew while staying in Hong Kong to receive an honorary degree from the University of Hong Kong. Singapore had gained independence only five years earlier and was rapidly developing its small territory. They got on well, and Tange was soon invited to serve as an advisor to the urban planning arm of the Singaporean government. Initially, he gave advice on what should be preserved and what should be rebuilt, and he also planned the development of a reclaimed area, Marina South.

In the 1980s, Tange designed the main campus layout and building complex of the newly established Nanyang Technological University. He also defined the skyline of the Central Business District by designing iconic buildings such as One Raffles Place (the tallest building outside the United States upon its completion), the Pickering Operations Complex, and UOB Plaza in the 1980s and 1990s. He also designed Singapore Indoor Stadium.

=== Hawaii Hochi Building ===
Started in 1972 and completed in 1975 for Hawaii Hochi, a Japanese language newspaper founded in 1912. The brutalist building was one of only two buildings Tange designed for construction in the United States, the other being an expansion for the Minneapolis Institute of Art. The building features two structures connected by an open air courtyard with tropical plants, and a rooftop parking lot.

=== Syrian Presidential Palace ===
In 1975, while Hafez al-Assad was still in power, Tange began designing the Presidential Palace in Damascus, Syria. According to a 2013 article by The Guardian, Tange resigned before construction began, and his original design was "reinterpreted" by others. The resulting compound ultimately enclosed 31,500 square metres (340,000 square feet) of space.

== Architectural circle ==
=== Congrès International d'Architecture Moderne ===
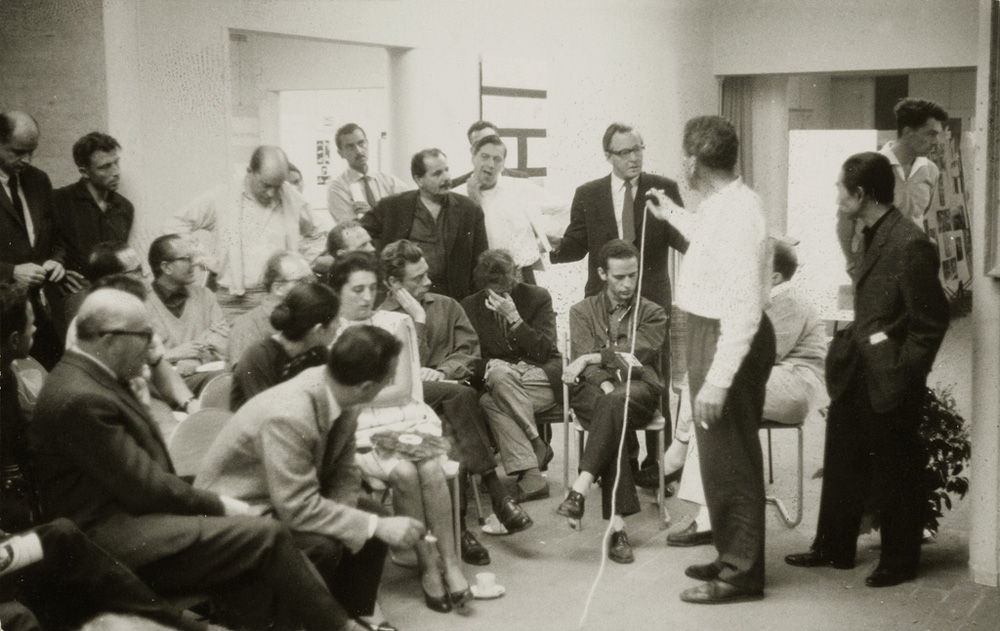
The Ottorlo Meeting of CIAM in 1959, when the organization was dissolved. Tange is standing second from right.

Tange's first placing in the design competition for the Hiroshima Peace Memorial Park gained him recognition from Kunio Maekawa. The elder architect invited Tange to attend the Congrès International d'Architecture Moderne (CIAM). Founded in 1928, this organization of planners and architects had initially promoted architecture in economic and social context, but at its fourth meeting in 1933 (under the direction of Le Corbusier) it debated the notion of the "Functional City". This led to a series of proposals on urban planning known as "The Athens Charter". By the 1951 CIAM meeting that was held in Hoddesdon, England, to which Tange was invited, the Athens Charter came under debate by younger members of the group (including Tange) who found the Charter too vague in relation to city expansion. The "Athens Charter" promoted the idea that a city gains character from its continual changes over many years; this notion was written before the advent of mass bombings and the Second World War and therefore held little meaning for Tange who had evidenced the destruction of Hiroshima. The discussions at Hoddesdon sowed discontent within CIAM that eventually contributed to its breakup after their Dubrovnik meeting in 1956; the younger members of CIAM formed a splinter group known as Team X, which Tange later joined. Tange presented various designs to Team X in their meetings. At a 1959 meeting in Otterlo, Holland, one of his presentations included an unrealised project by Kiyonori Kikutake; this project became the basis of the Metabolist Movement.

When Tange travelled back to Japan from the 1951 CIAM meeting, he visited Le Corbusier's nearly complete Unité d'Habitation in Marseilles, France. He also looked at the sketches for the new capital of Punjab at Chandigarh, India.

=== Tokyo World Design Conference and urban planning ===
Tange had left the Team X Otterlo conference early to take up a tenure at Massachusetts Institute of Technology. His experiences at the conference may have led him to set his fifth year students a project to design a 25-thousand-person residential community to be erected in Boston over the bay. The scheme comprised two giant A-frame structures that resembled Tange's competition entry for the World Health Organisation's headquarters on Lake Geneva. Both this scheme and the earlier ones by Kikutake formed the basis of Tange's speech to the Tokyo World Design Conference in 1960. In his speech he used words such as "cell" and "metabolism" in relation to urban design. The Metabolist movement grew out of discussions with other members of the conference. Amongst them were Kisho Kurokawa, Junzo Sakakura, Alison and Peter Smithson, Louis Kahn, Jean Prouvé, B. V. Doshi and Jacob Bakema. The conference ended with Tange's presentation of the Boston plan and his own scheme, "The Tokyo Plan – 1960".

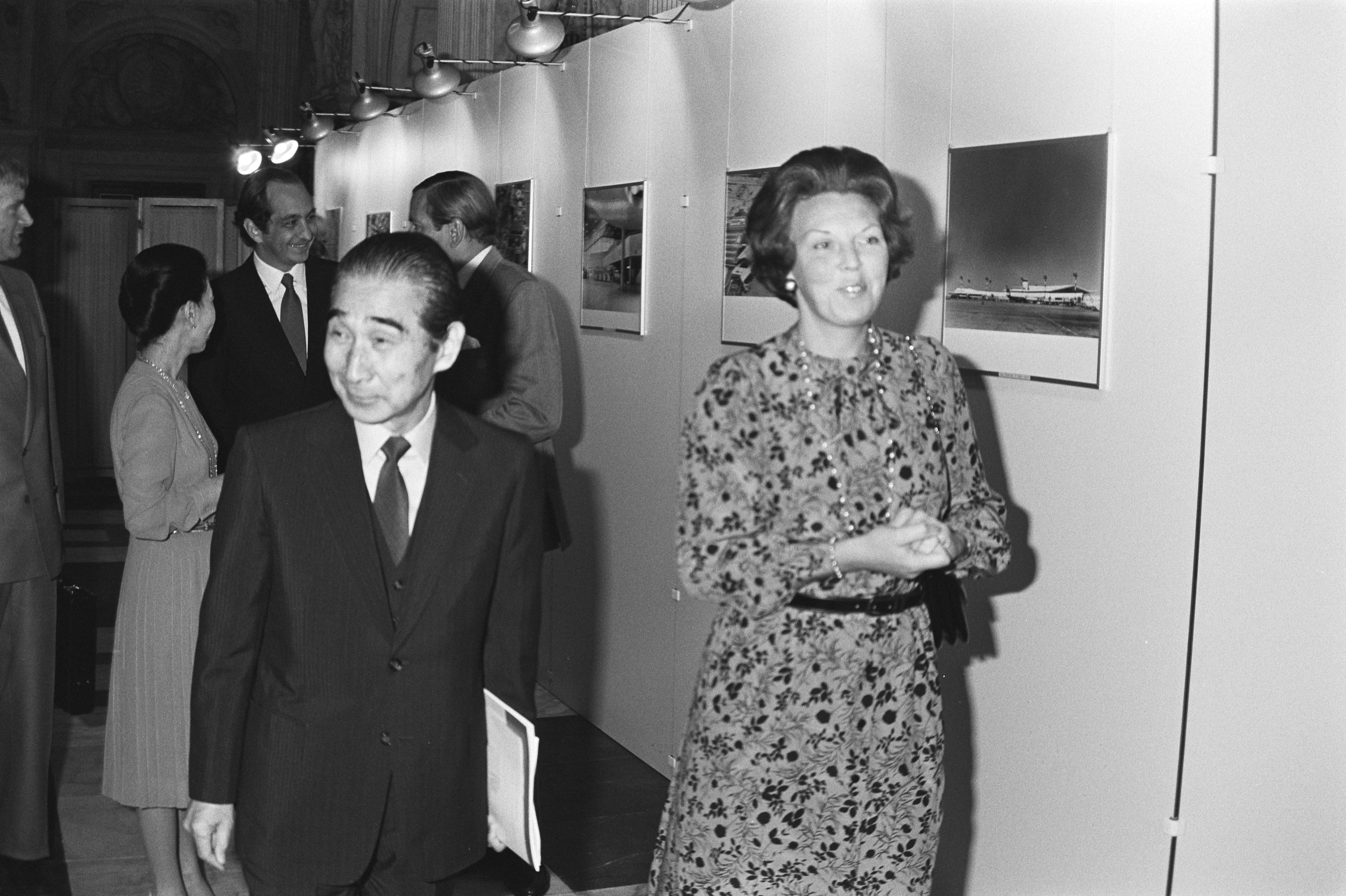
Tange with Beatrix of the Netherlands in 1981 at an exhibit in the Royal Palace of Amsterdam

Tange argued that the normal urban pattern of a radial centripetal transportation system was a relic of the Middle Ages and would not handle the strain placed upon it by the world's mega cities, which he qualified as those with populations greater than 10 million. Rather than building up a city from a civic centre, Tange's proposal was based on civic axis, developing the city in a linear fashion. Three levels of traffic, graded according to speed, would facilitate the movement of up to 2.5 million people along the axis, which would be divided into vertebrae-like cyclical transportation elements. The sheer size of the proposal meant that it would stretch out across the water of Tokyo Bay. Tange's proposals at this conference play a large part in establishing his reputation as "The West's favourite Japanese architect".

In 1965 Tange was asked by the United Nations to enter a limited competition for the redevelopment of Skopje, which was at that time a city of Socialist Federal Republic of Yugoslavia. The town had been heavily destroyed by an earthquake in 1963. Tange won 60% of the prize; the other 40% was awarded to the Yugoslav team. Tange's design furthered ideas put forward in the earlier "Tokyo Plan", which in turn served as an inspiration for the Yamanashi Press and Broadcasting Center.

=== Urbanists and Architects Team ===
Tange's inspiration for his design office came from his friend Walter Gropius who he had first met at the CIAM meeting in 1951. While lecturing at the Bauhaus, Gropius had placed great importance on teaching architects, especially imparting on them the concept of working together as a team. The Urbanists and Architects Team was founded in 1961 and became Kenzō Tange Associates. Tange promoted a very flat hierarchy in the practice: partners were equal in importance and were encouraged to participate in every project. Multiple options were developed simultaneously, and research on individual schemes was encouraged.

== Later career ==
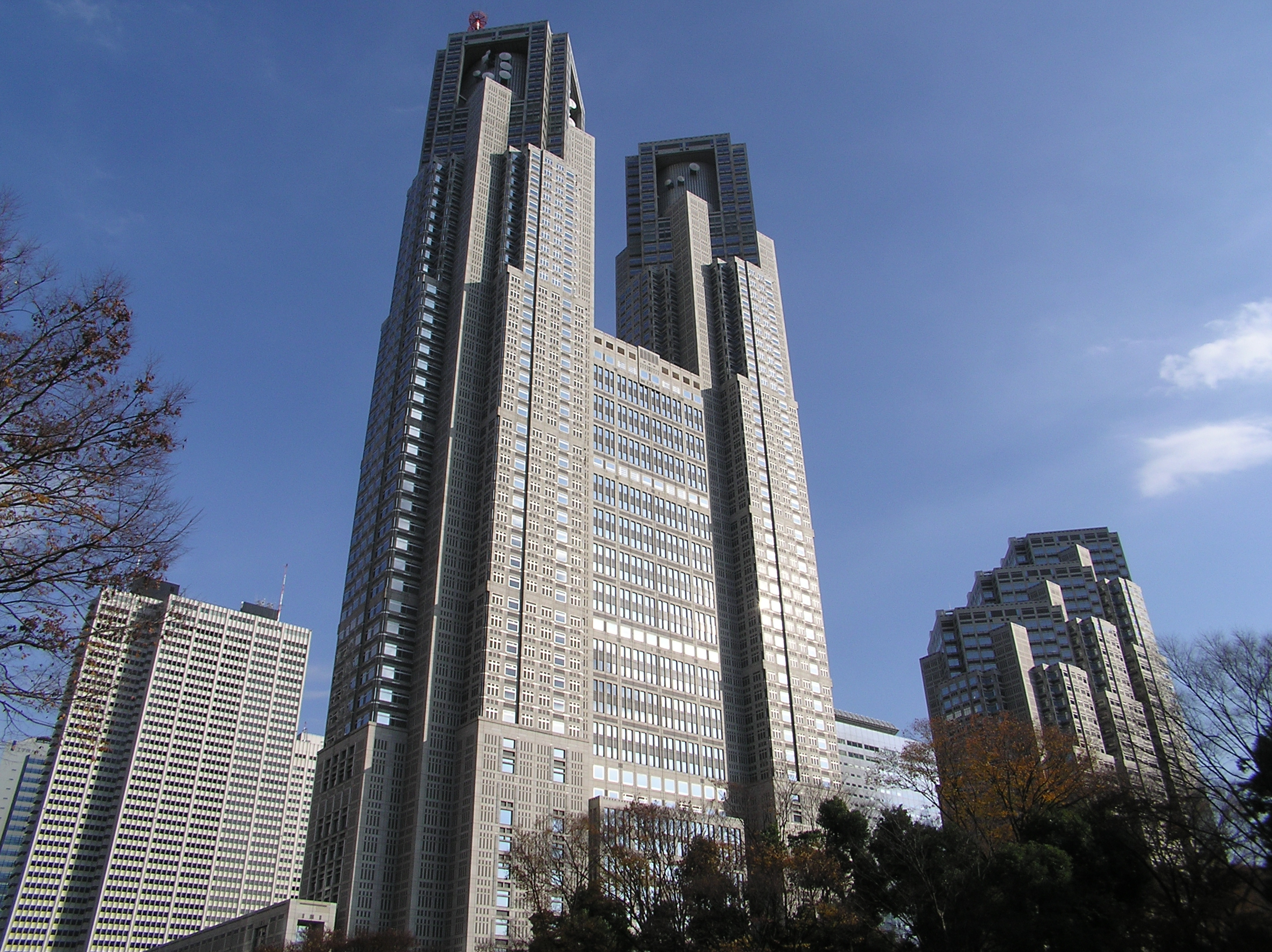
Tokyo Metropolitan Government Office, Shinjuku, Tokyo (1991)

During the 1970s and 1980s Tange expanded his portfolio to include buildings in over 20 countries around the world. In 1985, at the behest of Jacques Chirac, the mayor of Paris at that time, Tange proposed a master plan for a plaza at Place d'Italie that would interconnect the city along an east-west axis.

For the Tokyo Metropolitan Government Building, which opened in 1991, Tange designed a large civic centre with a plaza dominated by two skyscrapers. These house the administration offices whilst a smaller seven-storey building contains assembly facilities. In his design of a high tech version of Kofu Communications Centre, Tange equipped all three buildings with state-of-the-art building management systems that monitored air quality, light levels and security. The external skin of the building makes dual references to both tradition and the modern condition. Tange incorporated vertical and horizontal lines reminiscent of both timber boarding and the lines on semiconductor boards.

Tange converted to Christianity, taking the name Joseph, the husband of Mary mother of Christ, some time before his death. He continued to practice until three years before his death in 2005. He disliked postmodernism in the 1980s and considered this style of architecture to be only "transitional architectural expressions". His funeral was held in one of his works, the Tokyo Cathedral.

Tadao Ando, one of Japan's greatest living architects, likes to tell the story of the stray dog, a stately akita, that wandered into his studio in Osaka some 20 years ago, and decided to stay. "First, I thought I would call her Kenzo Tange; but then I realised I couldn't kick Kenzo Tange around. So I called her Le Corbusier instead."

— Obituary in The Guardian

== Legacy ==
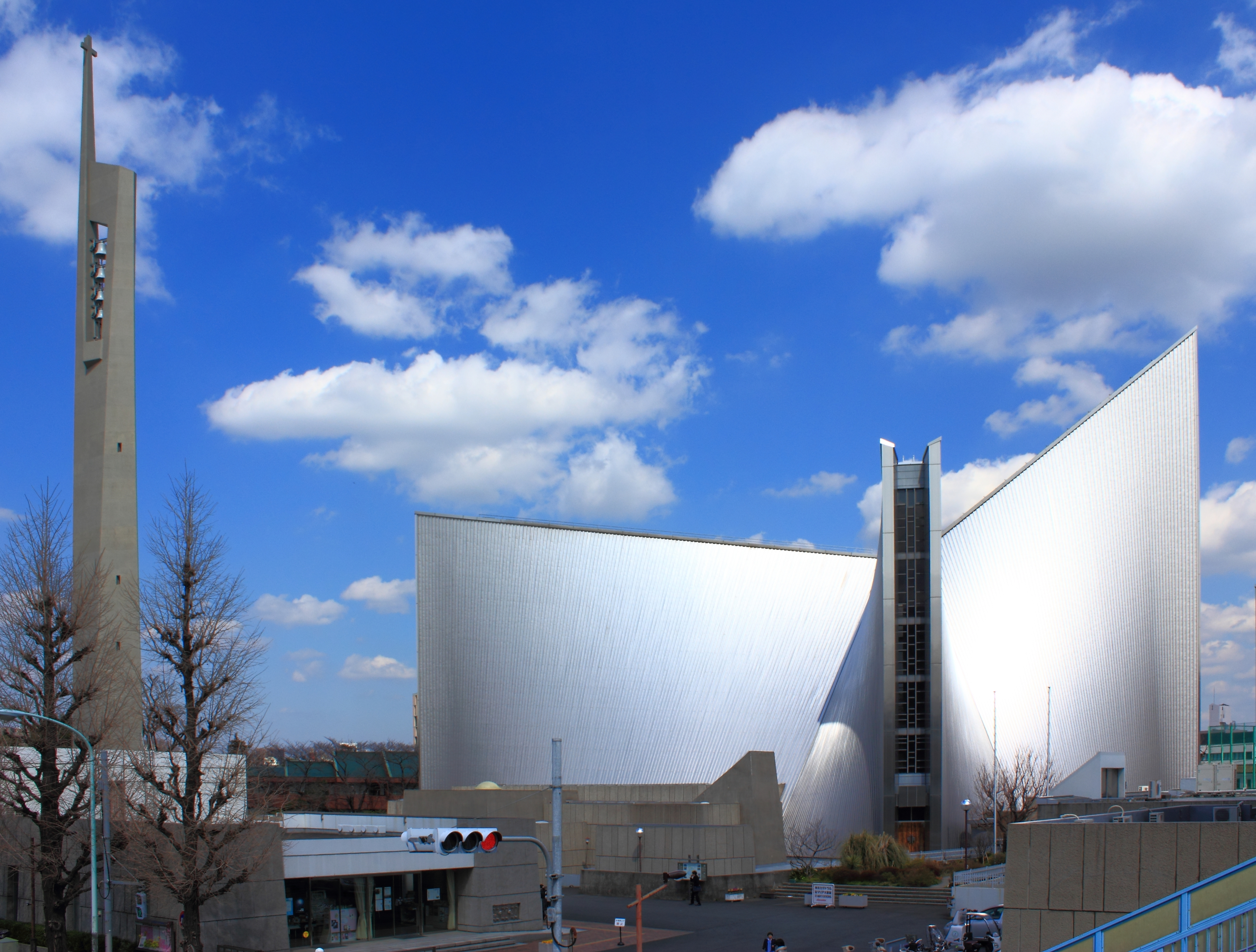
St. Mary's Cathedral (Tokyo Cathedral), Tokyo (1964)

The modular expansion of Tange's Metabolist visions had some influence on Archigram with their plug-in mega structures. The Metabolist movement gave momentum to Kikutake's career. Although his Marine City proposals (submitted by Tange at CIAM) were not realised, his Miyakonojo City Hall (1966) was a more Metabolist example of Tange's own Nichinan Cultural Centre (1962). Although the Osaka Expo had marked a decline in the Metabolist movement, it resulted in a "handing over" of the reigns to a younger generation of architects such as Kazuo Shinohara and Arata Isozaki.

In an interview with Jeremy Melvin at the Royal Academy of Arts, Kengo Kuma explained that, at the age of ten, he was inspired to become an architect after seeing Tange's Olympic arenas, which were constructed in 1964.

For Reyner Banham, Tange was a prime exemplar of the use of Brutalist architecture. His use of Béton brut concrete finishes in a raw and undecorated way combined with his civic projects such as the redevelopment of Tokyo Bay made him a great influence on British architects during the 1960s.

Tange's son Paul Noritaka Tange graduated from Harvard University in 1985 and went on to join Kenzō Tange Associates. He became the president of Kenzo Tange Associates in 1997 before founding Tange Associates in 2002.

== Awards ==
- RIBA Gold Medal (1965)
- American Institute of Architects Gold Medal (1966)
- French Academy of Architecture Grand Medal of Gold (1973)
- Pritzker Architecture Prize (1987)
- Olympic Diploma of Merit (1965)
