= Horn–Vincent–Russell Estate =

Historic house in Kansas, United States

- U.S. National Register of Historic Places
- U.S. Historic district
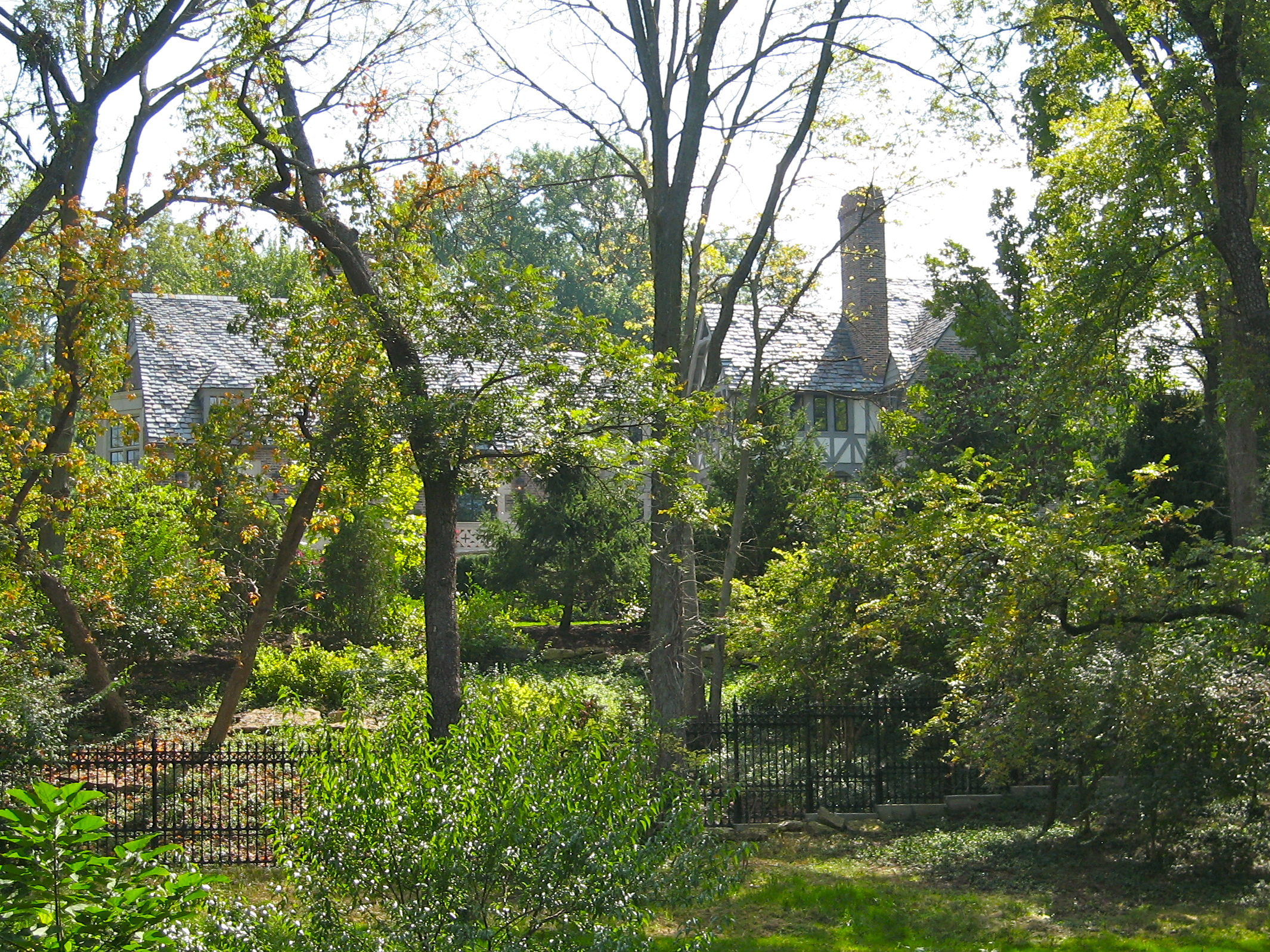
- The Horn–Vincent–Russell Estate in 2014

- Location within Kansas Location within the United States
- Location: 6624 Wenonga Road, Mission Hills, Kansas
- Coordinates: 39°0′36″N 94°37′40″W
- Area: 7.4 acres (3.0 ha)
- Built: 1929
- Architectural style: Late 19th And 20th Century Revivals, Tudor Revival
- NRHP reference No.: 97000819
- Added to NRHP: July 25, 1997

The Horn–Vincent–Russell Estate is a historic mansion in Mission Hills, Kansas, U.S.. It was built from 1929 to 1931 for Phoebe and John Horn. It was designed by architect Edward Tanner in the Tudor Revival style. It has been listed on the National Register of Historic Places since July 25, 1997.
