= Franklin R. Lanter House =

Historic house in Kansas, United States

- U.S. National Register of Historic Places
- The house in 2013

- Location within Kansas Location within the United States
- Location: 562 West Park Street, Olathe, Kansas
- Coordinates: 38°52′56″N 94°49′37″W
- Area: less than one acre
- Built: 1901
- Architect: George P. Washburn
- Architectural style: Queen Anne
- NRHP reference No.: 07001066
- Added to NRHP: October 10, 2007

The Franklin R. Lanter House is a historic house located at 562 West Park Street in Olathe, Kansas.

== Description and history ==
The two-story, wood-framed house was built in 1901 for Franklin R. Lanter, a lumber and coal merchant. It was designed by architect George P. Washburn in the Queen Anne style, especially Free Classicism. Lanter lived in the house until 1919. It was later converted into apartments, and eventually remodelled as a single-family residence.

It was listed on the National Register of Historic Places on October 10, 2007.
