= Herman J. and Ella B. Voigts House =

Historic house in Kansas, United States

- U.S. National Register of Historic Places
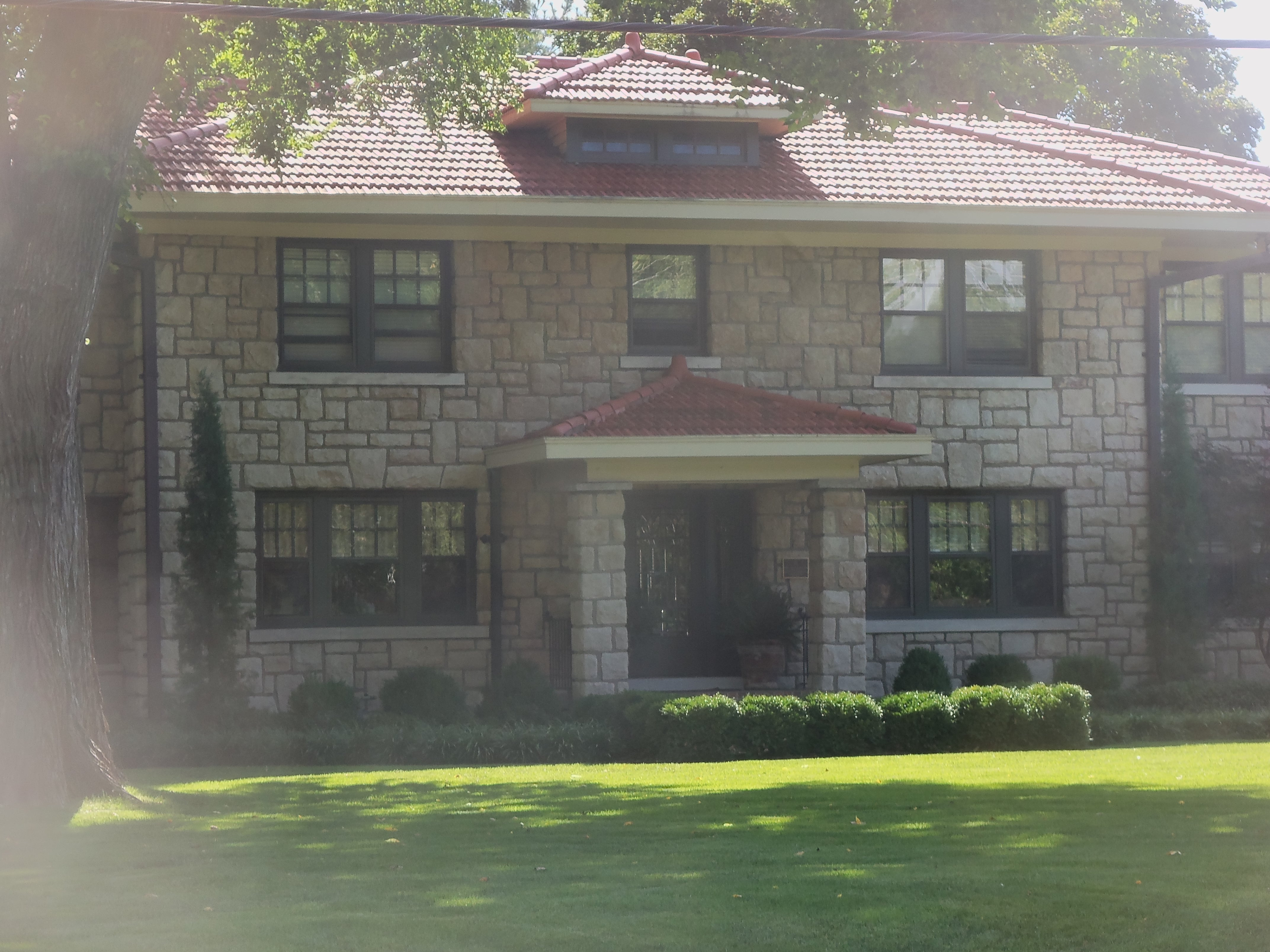
- The Herman J. and Ella B. Voigts House in 2013

- Location within Kansas Location within the United States
- Location: 2405 West 103rd Street, Leawood, Kansas
- Coordinates: 38°56′31″N 94°37′9″W
- Area: less than one acre
- Built: 1923
- Architectural style: Prairie School
- NRHP reference No.: 95000603
- Added to NRHP: May 18, 1995

The Herman J. and Ella B. Voigts House is a historic house in Leawood, Kansas, U.S.. It was built in 1923 for Herman J. Voigts, the president of the First National Bank of Olathe, and his wife Ella Busch. It was designed in the Prairie School architectural style. The couple died in 1970 and 1956 respectively, and their daughter Anna Lois Dubach lived in the inherited house until her death in 1992. It was purchased by Barry Grissom in 1993. It has been listed on the National Register of Historic Places since May 18, 1995.
