= William Thomas Turner Barn =

- Turner, William Thomas, Barn
- U.S. National Register of Historic Places
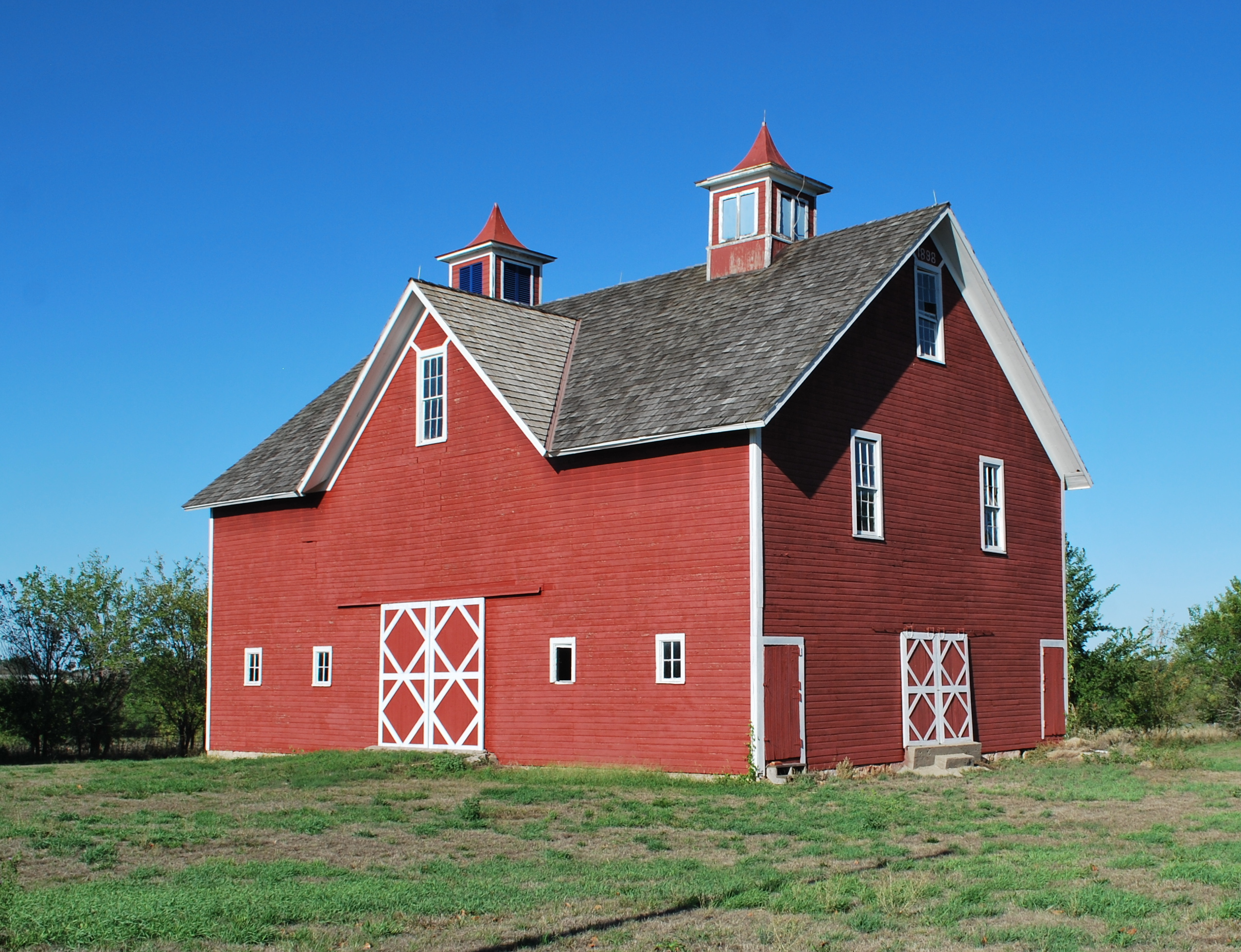

- Location within Kansas Location within the United States
- Nearest city: Gardner, Kansas
- Coordinates: 38°46′11″N 94°54′28″W
- Area: less than one acre
- Built: 1898
- Architect: Arthur J. Clinton
- Architectural style: Cross gabled frame
- NRHP reference No.: 99000420
- Added to NRHP: April 1, 1999

The William Thomas Turner Barn was built in 1898 near Gardner, Kansas, United States. The Turner barn is regarded as an outstanding example of barn construction, built by Arthur J. Clinton, a highly regarded barn builder. The barn has been extensively photographed and has been featured in magazines, greeting cards, calendars and other publications.

The barn was built to a high standard of craftsmanship, using red cypress, a durable wood not often used in Kansas. The barn has a limestone foundation. The barn has two levels. The barn measures 62 feet (19 m) wide, 40 feet (12 m) deep and 45 feet (14 m) high overall. It is capped by two large wood ventilators. The interior has two main levels, with a large hayloft on the upper level. The lower level has intersecting corridors running down the center between the facades, with accommodations for 15 horses and three grain bins.

The Turner barn's exterior materials and detailing are in a remarkable state of preservation. It was placed on the National Register of Historic Places on April 1, 1999. The Turner Barn is still owned by the Turner Family and is open to the public.
