= Sauter AG =

Swiss-based Corporate group

Fr. Sauter AG
- Type: Aktiengesellschaft (AG)
- Industry: Building automation, building technology
- Founded: 1910; 116 years ago
- Headquarters: Basel, Basel-Stadt, Switzerland
- Area served: Worldwide
- Key people: Marc Jaquet, (Chairman of the Board of Directors); Dr. Werner Karlen (CEO)
- Revenue: € 692 million (2022)
- Number of employees: 3,387 (2022)
- Website: www.sauter-controls.com

Sauter is a Swiss-based corporate group that produces building automation, system integration, facility management and mechanical and electrical contracting with headquarters in Basel. It operates from its head office under the name of Fr. Sauter AG. The group employs around 3387 people and generated sales of € 692 million.

== History ==
In 1910, the company was founded by Fritz Sauter in Grindelwald (CH), as a manufacturer of electrical time switches. The growing number of incoming orders led to an expansion and relocation of the operation to Basel. In 1920, the company was converted into a private limited company.

In 1912, Sauter brought its first product to the market in the form of a time-switch – an astronomical clock for switching city street lighting on and off. The lights were switched on and off in the evening and morning, at the seasonal hour for twilight.

In 1917, Sauter developed a boiler for the Basel power station, which was well received on the market. The company had already moved its workshop to Basel in 1916 because of its good relationship with the power station.

In 1935, Sauter took the step from time- or temperature-controlled activation of equipment to control technology, thus laying the foundation for its current main business.

In the early 1950s, Sauter started integrating electronics into the products. The product range comprised devices for controlling temperature, humidity and pressure.

In 1974, Sauter brought its first software-controlled building management system onto the market; in 1981, the first devices with microprocessors.

In 1984, Sauter Holding AG was founded to defend against a hostile takeover bid. The operational activities are consolidated under Fr. Sauter AG.

In 1997, the first Internet-based automation product, that enables the system to be controlled using a web browser, came onto the market.

Starting in 2000, Sauter expanded its activities into the service sector. Facility management became an integral part of its key business. In 2002, Sauter began integrating the standardised BACnet communication protocol into the products. In 2009, Sauter brought its Energy Management Solution (EMS) onto the market. In 2012, the Sauter Vision Center software, a building management suite with a modular, scalable visualisation and management level, came onto the market.

On 1 April 2017, Sauter FM GmbH took over Pandomus AG in Cologne; Germany and its management properties. In 2018, WREN Ltd in Leatherhead, United Kingdom, and Sirus in Cork and Dublin, Ireland, were acquired, in 2020 Techne S.p.A Facility Management in Bergamo, Italy, in 2022 the Emtec Group in Glasgow, United Kingdom, and in 2023 T4 Mechanical & Electrical Ltd, Lidex Control Systems Ltd and React 4 Group Ltd in Redhill, United Kingdom.

In 2019, launch of the new modulo 6 building automation system. Since 2020, there is the new Smart Actuator, a valve and air damper actuator with integrated controller, IoT and cloud connection.

In 2023, the smart sensor viaSens, a multi-sensor for integrated room automation, was presented.

== Group structure ==
The Sauter Group includes 16 subsidiaries in Europe, joint ventures in China and the Middle East, and local agencies in other countries. Countries with Sauter subsidiaries: Switzerland, Germany, France, Italy, Spain, United Kingdom, Austria, Slovakia, Netherlands, Belgium, Sweden, the Czech Republic, Hungary, Poland, Romania, Serbia. The portfolio includes the four specialist fields of Systems, Components, Services and Facility Management. The Facility Management business in Germany is managed by Sauter FM GmbH with headquarters in Augsburg, a 100-percent owned subsidiary of the German Sauter branch.

Fr. Sauter AG is owned by Fr. Sauter Holding AG. This is owned by FS Familienholding AG, Basel, which was founded by descendants of Fritz Sauter, and Fabrel AG, Hergiswil. In addition to these two main shareholders, a number of natural persons also hold small stakes.

== Products and services ==
Sauter produces hardware and software for regulation, control and building management systems for applications in the fields of heating, ventilation and air conditioning. The product range includes room sensors, transducers, thermostats, pressure switches, electrical actuators, pneumatic actuators, valves, mixing valves, and dampers. On the management level, Sauter develops software for building management, as well as systems and room automation stations for individual room control and room management. Development and production takes place at the factory in Basel.

The area of building services includes services such as contracting, maintenance and monitoring. An increasingly important mainstay are services in the field of energy-conscious, technical, infrastructural and commercial facility management.

== Previous areas of activity ==
=== Boilers, electric cooking stoves ===
To operate on the French market, Sauter saw the need to set up a French production site. In 1923 Fritz Sauter and Godefroy Schlumberger founded the Société pour l'exploitation des Procédés Sauter Sàrl in the Alsatian town of Saint-Louis. Sauter initially used the French production plant to assemble only boiler of the Cumulus brand and storage heaters of the Primulus brand. Due to the Second World War the French government moved any industry close to the border further into the country, and the Procédés Sauter relocated to Claye-Souilly, thus also distancing itself from its Swiss partner. In 1948 Sauter sold its share of the Procédés Sauter to Continental et Garnier and, on 1 June 1948, it formed a new subsidiary, Sauter Appareils Automatiques SA, in Saint-Louis. While Continental et Garnier retained the Sauter brand for the household appliance sector, the new company busied itself with control technology.

In 1972 Garnier was taken over by Schlumberger. Brandt SA gave the Sauter kitchen appliance brand access to the Spanish Fagor Group, which filed for bankruptcy in November 2013. In April 2014 Fagor was partially taken over by the Algerian Groupe Cevital.

=== Electricity meters ===
In 1991 the control technology-related activities in France were divested into a new company, Sauter Regulation SA. The activities that remained with Sauter Appareils Automatiques SA (development, production and sale of electricity meters for the French market) were sold to the Zellweger Luwa Group in 1992. These activities were transferred from Zellweger to the Deutsche Zählergesellschaft, which closed the plant in 2007 after it had relocated to Mulhouse.

=== Ozonation and control of water supply installations ===
In 1948 the company got involved with the control of water supply installations with a water reservoir in Les Brenets. In 1955, in collaboration with the Compagnie des eaux et de l'ozone the drinking water supply of the canton psychiatric hospital in Boudry in Neuchâtel was upgraded. As a result, the ozonation of drinking water became a separate line of business. From 1972 onwards, Sauter ozone installations were also used to neutralise odours in the return air of purification plants. The ozonation business was sold to Christ Water Technology AG around 1980.

The remaining business for controlling water supply installations was sold to Rittmeyer AG in 1996.

== Company logo ==
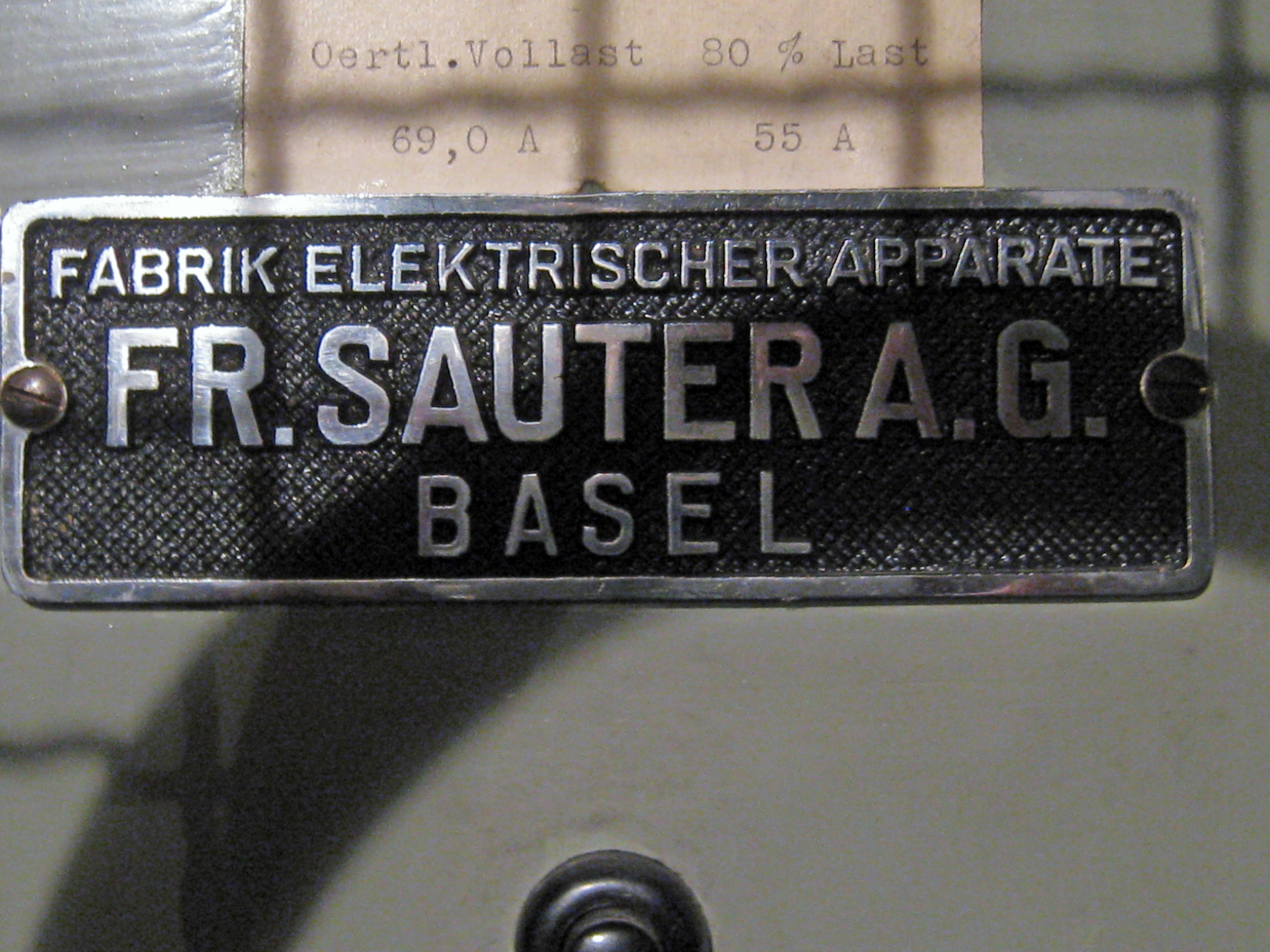
World War II

Up to 1994

1994 to 2008

Since 2008

== Literature ==
Christian Brückner, Markus Brückner: Aus eigener Kraft – Rückblick auf 100 Jahre Firmengeschichte der Fr. Sauter AG, Basel, Basel 2010, ISBN 3-9522350-9-1, online, in German (PDF; 5.0 MB)
