= Pickering scale =

The Pickering scale is a scale of rating astronomical seeing, the blurring of images caused by atmospheric turbulence. The scale was developed by William H. Pickering (1858–1938) of Harvard College Observatory, using a 5" (13 cm) refractor. Seeing of 1 to 3 is considered very poor, 4 to 5 is poor, 6 to 7 is good, and 8 to 10 is excellent.
