= I. O. Pickering House =

Historic house in Kansas, United States

- U.S. National Register of Historic Places
- The I. O. Pickering House in 2013

- Location within Kansas Location within the United States
- Location: 507 West Park Street, Olathe, Kansas
- Coordinates: 38°53′1″N 94°49′28″W
- Area: 1 acre (0.40 ha)
- Built: 1878
- Architectural style: Stick/eastlake, Italianate
- NRHP reference No.: 80001468
- Added to NRHP: December 1, 1980

The I. O. Pickering House is a historic house in Olathe, Kansas, U.S.. It was built in 1878 for Isaac O. Pickering, who served as the mayor of Olathe from 1878 to 1885. It remained in the Pickering family until 1960. It has been listed on the National Register of Historic Places since December 1, 1980.
