= Lanesfield School =

Historic school in Kansas, United States

- U.S. National Register of Historic Places
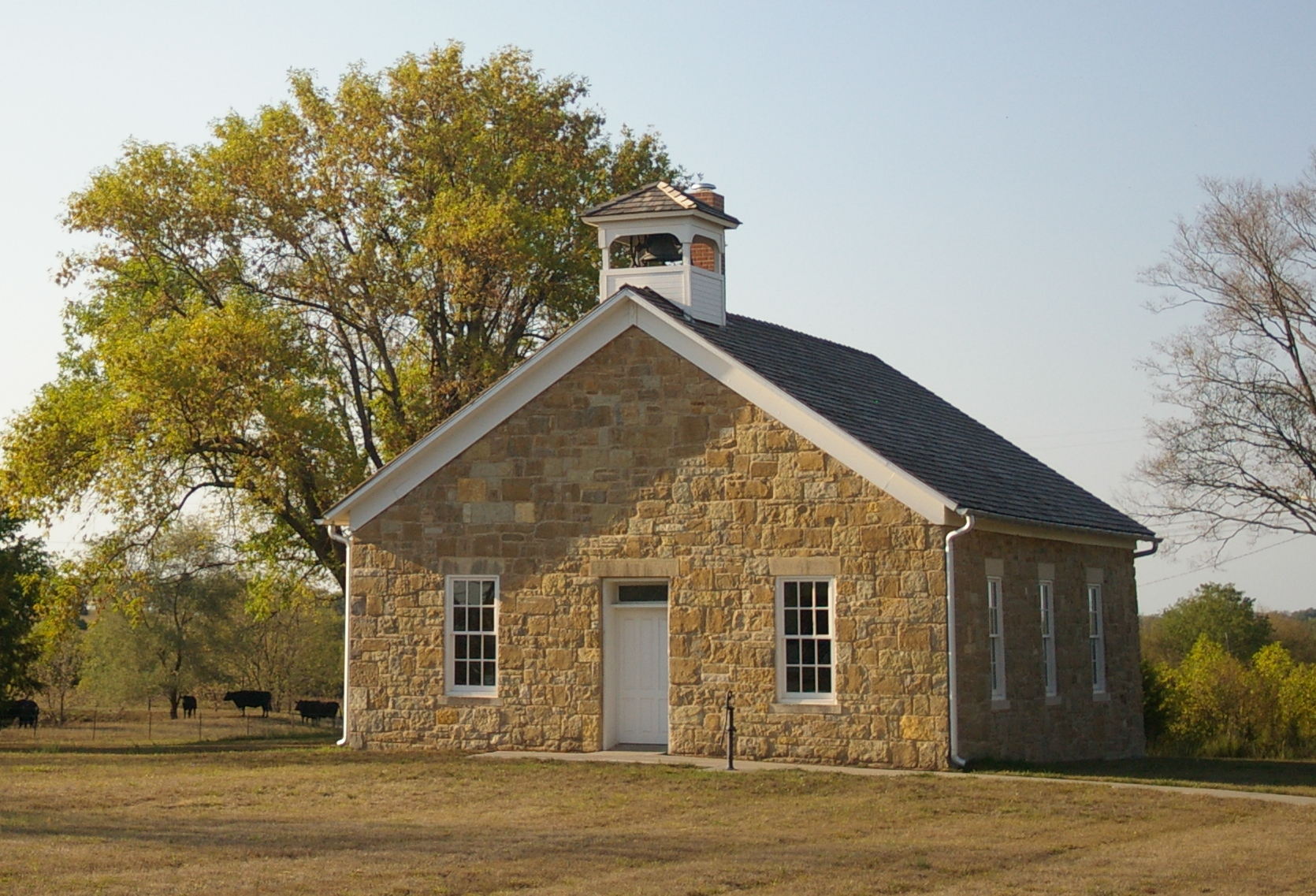
- The Lanesfield School in 2012

- Location within Kansas Location within the United States
- Location: 18745 S. Dillie Road, Edgerton, Kansas
- Coordinates: 38°47′22″N 94°59′33″W
- Built: 1869
- NRHP reference No.: 88001902
- Added to NRHP: October 13, 1988

The Lanesfield School is a historic limestone one-room school in Edgerton, Kansas that operated as a school from 1869 to 1963. The school is an example of the one-room schoolhouses that served much of rural America during the nineteenth century, and it is the only remaining structure from the former town of Lanesfield, which served as a mail stop along the Pony Express and Santa Fe Trail. The school reopened as a museum in 1967. The school is located on the Lanesfield Historic Site which includes the schoolhouse, four outbuildings, and a modern visitors center.

== History ==
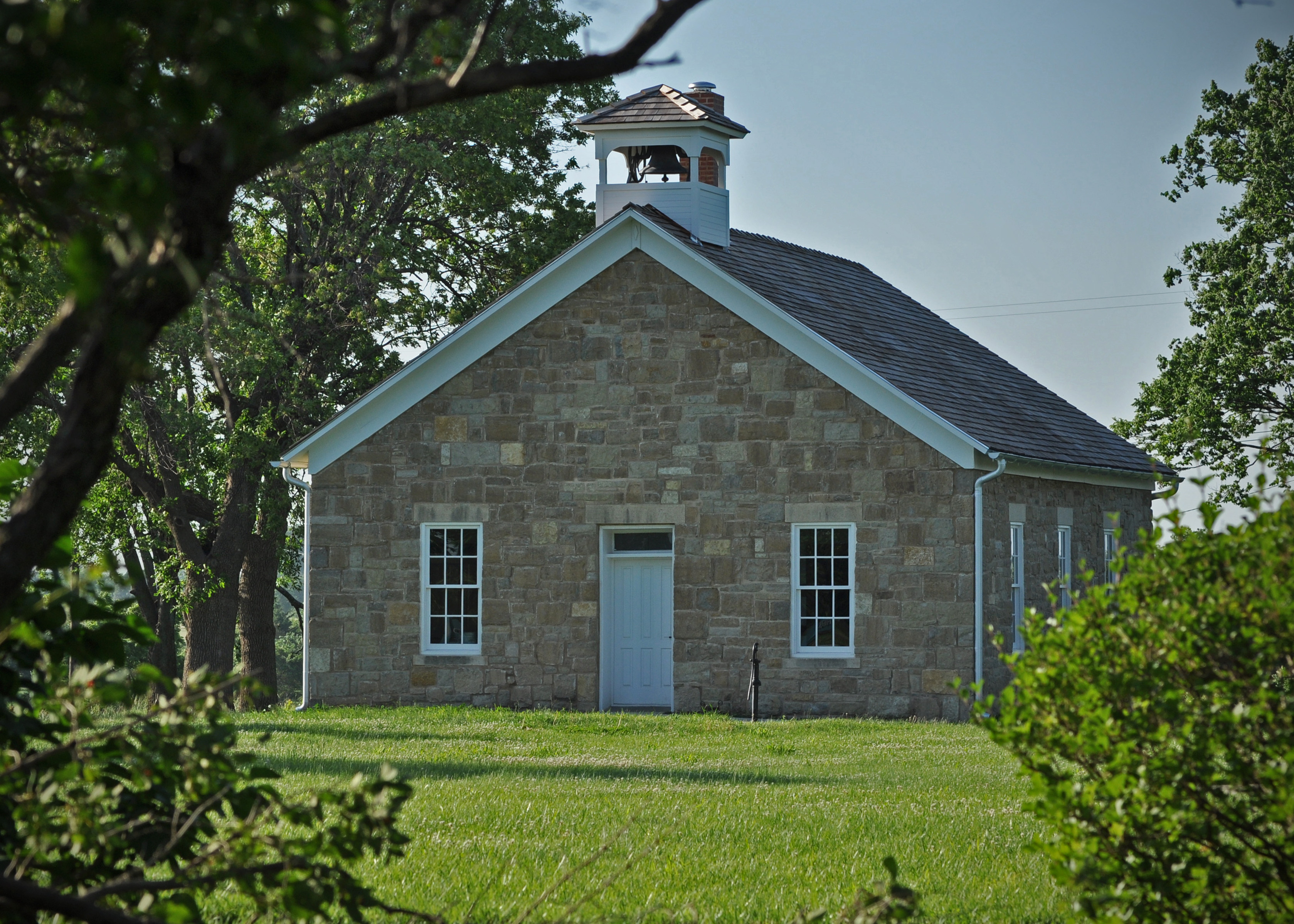
Lanesfeild School in 2009

=== Founding and early years ===
The town of Lanesfield was founded in 1858 by James H. Lane, an abolitionist and Union Army brigadier general during the American Civil War, and William Gans. Lane and Gans were instrumental in the establishment of the town, overseeing the construction of various buildings, including a hotel, stores, and churches. Lane also led the establishment of a log school house on the Burton Dille farm, however, he did not live to see its opening in 1867, having died by suicide in 1866.

A new stone schoolhouse was constructed following a unanimous vote by local residents to issue $1,000 in school bonds in May 1869. By the spring of 1870, the school had an enrollment of 69 students, with an average daily attendance of 51. The school served children from various age groups, reflecting the typical structure of one-room schoolhouses in rural America. The schoolhouse remained a prominent institution for the community, hosting not only educational activities but also social events, elections, and community meetings.

=== Decline and closure ===
The decline of Lanesfield began in the late 19th century, particularly after the establishment of a railroad station in nearby Edgerton, Kansas, in 1871. This shift in transportation and commerce led to a decrease in the town's population, and many buildings were relocated to Edgerton. Nevertheless, the Lanesfield School continued to operate, adapting to the changing demographics and needs of the community.

The school faced a significant setback when it was struck by lightning in 1903, resulting in a fire that destroyed much of the interior. Restoration efforts were completed by 1904, allowing the school to resume its educational functions. However, by the mid-20th century, rural schools across Kansas began to close due to declining enrollment and the consolidation of school districts. The Lanesfield School was officially closed in 1963 after 93 years of service.

=== Conversion to museum ===
Soon after the school's closure, the McCamish Township Board contacted the owner, District 81 in Edgerton, about purchasing the closed school for historical preservation purposes. The school district agreed and sold the school to the town for $1. In 1966, a 125-member Lanesfeild School Historical Society was organized and began work on their goal of converting the school into a museum. In 1967, the Lanesfield School was officially reopened as a museum, preserving its historical significance and providing educational opportunities for visitors. In March 1987, the Johnson County Board of County Commissioners approved funds for renovations to restore the school and the site to appear as they did in 1904 and to add a modern visitors center featuring exhibits on one-room schools in Kansas, a museum store, and restrooms. The renovated museum and site opened to the public on April 1, 1989.

== Museum ==
The Lanesfield Historic Site includes the original schoolhouse, four outbuildings, and a visitor center. The site offers several interpretive panels and an audio tour that discusses the history of the schoolhouse, the town of Lanesfield, and its connections to broader historical themes, including the Santa Fe Trail and the local Border War. The museum is a popular destination for school field trips, open to the public once a month, and hosts various special events, such as escape rooms and a yearly 1904-themed Christmas concert.
