= Wolcott House (Mission Hills, Kansas) =

Historic house in Kansas, United States

- U.S. National Register of Historic Places
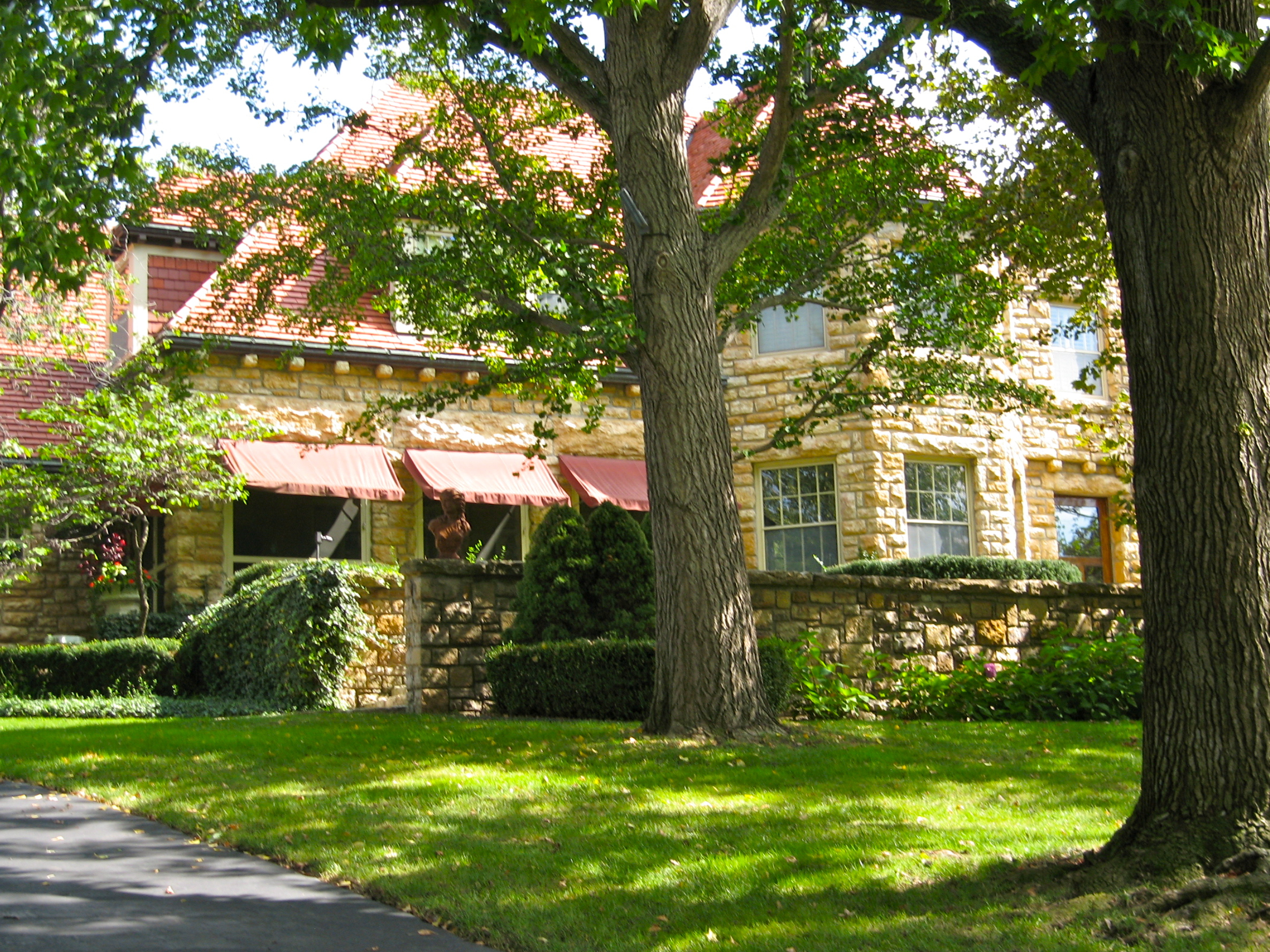
- The Wolcott House in 2014

- Location within Kansas Location within the United States
- Location: 5701 Oakwood Road, Mission Hills, Kansas
- Coordinates: 39°1′30″N 94°36′43″W
- Area: 2.1 acres (0.85 ha)
- Built: 1928
- Architectural style: Tudor Revival, French Eclectic
- NRHP reference No.: 01000448
- Added to NRHP: May 2, 2001

The Wolcott House is a historic house in Mission Hills, Kansas, U.S.. It was built in 1928 for John J. Wolcott, a grain dealer, and his wife Wynnogene (also known as Daisy). It was designed by architect Selby Kurfiss in the Tudor Revival style, with elements of French eclecticism. In 1939, it was purchased by Louis S. Myers, the vice president and treasurer of the Rodney Milling Company. By 1951, it was purchased by Samuel Sosland, the editor of Southwestern Miller. It was then purchased by David W. Gibson, the president of the Wolcott-Lincoln Company, in 1984, followed by Mark A. Morgan in 1997, and Michael Coughlin in 1999. It has been listed on the National Register of Historic Places since May 2, 2001.
