= Westwood Hills, Kansas =

- City
- Location within Johnson County and Kansas
- Interactive map of Westwood Hills, Kansas
- Coordinates: 39°02′20″N 94°36′35″W
- Country: United States
- State: Kansas
- County: Johnson
- Founded: 1922
- Incorporated: 1949

Area
  - Total: 0.066 sq mi (0.17 km^{2})
  - Land: 0.066 sq mi (0.17 km^{2})
  - Water: 0 sq mi (0.00 km^{2})
- Elevation: 902 ft (275 m)

Population (2020)
  - Total: 400
  - Density: 6,100/sq mi (2,400/km^{2})
- Time zone: UTC-6 (CST)
  - Summer (DST): UTC-5 (CDT)
- ZIP Code: 66205
- Area code: 913
- FIPS code: 20-77525
- GNIS ID: 485661
- Website: westwoodhillsks.gov

Westwood Hills is a city in Johnson County, Kansas, United States. As of the 2020 census, the population of the city was 400. It is the most densely populated city in the Kansas City Metropolitan Area at 6,240 people per square mile. It borders Kansas City, Missouri.

== History ==
Westwood Hills got its start in the year 1922 when developer J.C. Nichols platted the subdivision and began construction.

In 2013, Westwood Hills was added to the National Register of Historic Places.

== Geography ==
According to the United States Census Bureau, the city has a total area of 0.07 square miles (0.18 km^{2}), all land.

== Demographics ==
Historical population
Census	Pop.	Note	%±
1950	431		—
1960	495		14.8%
1970	414		−16.4%
1980	437		5.6%
1990	383		−12.4%
2000	378		−1.3%
2010	359		−5.0%
2020	400		11.4%
U.S. Decennial Census

=== Racial and ethnic composition ===
Westwood Hills city, Kansas – Racial and ethnic composition Note: the US Census treats Hispanic/Latino as an ethnic category. This table excludes Latinos from the racial categories and assigns them to a separate category. Hispanics/Latinos may be of any race.
Race / Ethnicity (NH = Non-Hispanic)	Pop 2000	Pop 2010	Pop 2020	% 2000	% 2010	% 2020
White alone (NH)	351	329	340	92.86%	91.64%	85.00%
Black or African American alone (NH)	6	5	4	1.59%	1.39%	1.00%
Native American or Alaska Native alone (NH)	1	0	2	0.26%	0.00%	0.50%
Asian alone (NH)	12	7	9	3.17%	1.95%	2.25%
Native Hawaiian or Pacific Islander alone (NH)	0	0	0	0.00%	0.00%	0.00%
Other race alone (NH)	0	0	3	0.00%	0.00%	0.75%
Mixed race or Multiracial (NH)	4	7	15	1.06%	1.95%	3.75%
Hispanic or Latino (any race)	4	11	27	1.06%	3.06%	6.75%
Total	378	359	400	100.00%	100.00%	100.00%

=== 2010 census ===
As of the census of 2010, there were 359 people, 167 households, and 105 families living in the city. The population density was 5,128.6 inhabitants per square mile (1,980.2/km^{2}). There were 177 housing units at an average density of 2,528.6 per square mile (976.3/km^{2}). The racial makeup of the city was 94.4% White, 1.7% African American, 1.9% Asian, and 1.9% from two or more races. Hispanic or Latino of any race were 3.1% of the population.

There were 167 households, of which 25.7% had children under the age of 18 living with them, 54.5% were married couples living together, 6.6% had a female householder with no husband present, 1.8% had a male householder with no wife present, and 37.1% were non-families. 29.3% of all households were made up of individuals, and 10.2% had someone living alone who was 65 years of age or older. The average household size was 2.15 and the average family size was 2.65.

The median age in the city was 47.1 years. 17.8% of residents were under the age of 18; 4.2% were between the ages of 18 and 24; 26.2% were from 25 to 44; 34.3% were from 45 to 64; and 17.5% were 65 years of age or older. The gender makeup of the city was 50.1% male and 49.9% female.

=== 2000 census ===
As of the census of 2000, there were 378 people, 170 households, and 116 families living in the city. The population density was 5,512.0 inhabitants per square mile (2,128.2/km^{2}). There were 173 housing units at an average density of 2,522.7 per square mile (974.0/km^{2}). The racial makeup of the city was 93.92% White, 1.59% African American, 0.26% Native American, 3.17% Asian, and 1.06% from two or more races. Hispanic or Latino of any race were 1.06% of the population.

There were 170 households, out of which 28.2% had children under the age of 18 living with them, 59.4% were married couples living together, 7.6% had a female householder with no husband present, and 31.2% were non-families. 25.9% of all households were made up of individuals, and 4.1% had someone living alone who was 65 years of age or older. The average household size was 2.22 and the average family size was 2.70.

In the city, the population was spread out, with 21.7% under the age of 18, 3.2% from 18 to 24, 33.1% from 25 to 44, 31.7% from 45 to 64, and 10.3% who were 65 years of age or older. The median age was 41 years. For every 100 females, there were 98.9 males. For every 100 females age 18 and over, there were 93.5 males.

The median income for a household in the city was $81,812, and the median income for a family was $108,732. Males had a median income of $76,250 versus $52,188 for females. The per capita income for the city was $48,256. About 1.8% of families and 2.4% of the population were below the poverty line, including none of those under the age of eighteen or sixty-five or over.

== Transportation ==
=== Major highways ===
- US-169
