= Pickering High School =

Pickering High School may refer to:

- Pickering High School, Ajax, Ontario
- Pickering High School (Louisiana), Leesville, Louisiana
- Pickering High School, Hull, England
