= Wolcott Green Historic District =

Historic district in Connecticut, United States

- U.S. National Register of Historic Places
- U.S. Historic district
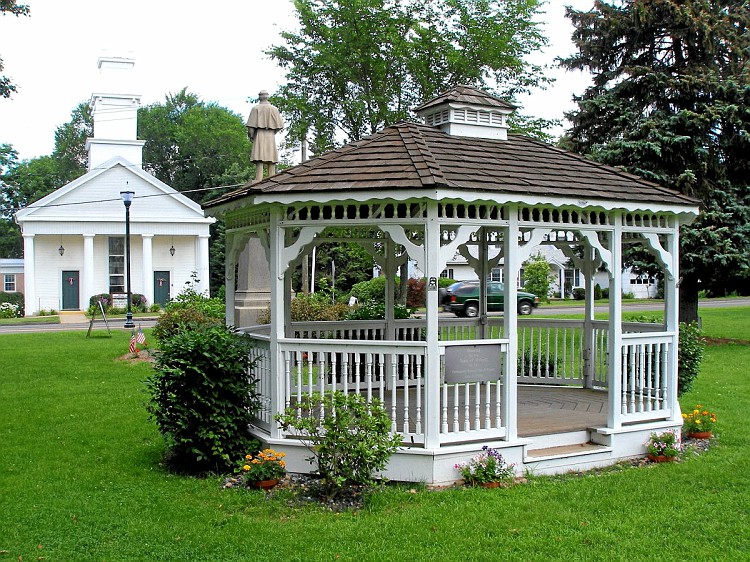
- The gazebo on the green; the Congregational Church is visible in the background

- Location within Connecticut Location within the United States
- Location: Roughly bounding Wolcott Green, Wolcott, Connecticut
- Coordinates: 41°36′5″N 72°58′33″W
- Architect: Tuttle, Daniel
- Architectural style: Federal, Greek Revival
- NRHP reference No.: 00000297
- Added to NRHP: March 31, 2000

Wolcott Green Historic District a historic district in the New England town of Wolcott, Connecticut. The district encompasses the town green and the surrounding buildings. The green is located in the town center of Wolcott along Center Road (Route 322). It has a triangular shape and is surrounded by several houses, a church and the town hall. The other streets bounding the green are Bound Line Road and Kenea Avenue.

The Greek Revival style Congregational Church is the dominant structure on the north side of the green. On the opposite end of the green from the church is the Wolcott Town Hall. The rest of the buildings around the green are 18th- and 19th-century houses. The district also includes the Farmingbury Burying Ground, now known as the Edgewood Cemetery.

The main green space contains several maple trees. There is a Civil War monument in the middle of the green that is surrounded by small shrubs. At the intersection of Kenea Avenue and Center Road is a granite obelisk dedicated to those who served in the two world wars and in the Korean, Vietnam, and Persian Gulf wars. The green also has benches at the corners of the open area and a picnic table near the intersection of Kenea Avenue and Bound Line Road.

== See also ==
- National Register of Historic Places listings in New Haven County, Connecticut
