= James Park =

James or Jim Park may refer to:

== Sports ==
- Jim Park (baseball) (1892–1970), American baseball pitcher
- Jim Park (footballer, born 1875) (1875–1919), Australian rules footballer for Essendon
- Jim Park (footballer, born 1910) (1910–1943), Australian rules footballer for Collingwood
- Jim Park (ice hockey) (born 1952), Canadian former ice hockey goaltender

== Others ==
- James Park (VC) (1835–1858), recipient of the Victoria Cross
- James Park (geologist) (1857–1946), New Zealand geologist, director of school of mines, university professor and writer
- James Allan Park (1763–1838), British judge
- James Park (entrepreneur), American tech entrepreneur, co-founder and CEO of Fitbit
- James L. Park, theoretical physicist

== See also ==
- James Parke (disambiguation)
- James Parks (disambiguation)
- James Parkes (disambiguation)
