= List of herbaria in North America =

This is a list of herbaria in North America, organized first by country or region where the herbarium is located, then within each region by size of the collection. All herbarium codes follow the Index Herbariorum. For other continents, see List of herbaria.

== Canada ==
Herbaria in Canada
Name	No. Specimens	Code	Province	City	Website
Agriculture and Agri-Food Canada, Vascular Plant Herbarium	1,335,000	DAO, DAOM	Ontario	Ottawa	
Royal Ontario Museum	860,000	TRT, TRTC	Ontario	Toronto	
Herbier Marie-Victorin, Université de Montréal	850,000	MT	Quebec	Montréal	
National Herbarium of Canada, Canadian Museum of Nature	838,000	CAN, CANM	Ontario	Ottawa	
Herbier Louis-Marie, Université Laval	770,000	ULF	Quebec	Quebec City	
University of British Columbia	560,000	UBC	British Columbia	Vancouver	
University of Alberta	320,000	ALTA	Alberta	Edmonton	
E.C. Smith Herbarium, Acadia University	200,000	ACAD	Nova Scotia	Wolfville	
Royal British Columbia Museum	188,000	V	British Columbia	Victoria	
W.P. Fraser Herbarium, University of Saskatchewan	160,000	SASK	Saskatchewan	Saskatoon	
Royal Alberta Museum	160,000	PMAE	Alberta	Edmonton	
Herbier du Québec	153,000	QUE	Quebec	Quebec City	
Fowler Herbarium, Queen's University	142,000	QK	Ontario	Kingston	
McGill University Herbarium	137,000	MTMG	Quebec	Montreal	
Agnes Marion Ayre Herbarium, Memorial University of Newfoundland	120,000	NFLD	Newfoundland and Labrador	St. John's	
OAC-BIO Herbariumm, University of Guelph	100,000	OAC	Ontario	Guelph	
Claude Garton Herbarium, Lakehead University	105,000	LKHD	Ontario	Thunder Bay	
University of Manitoba Herbarium, University of Manitoba	90,000	WIN	Manitoba	Winnipeg	
George F. Ledingham Herbarium, University of Regina	70,000	USAS	Saskatchewan	Regina	
Connell Memorial Herbarium, University of New Brunswick	67,000	UNB	New Brunswick	Fredericton	
RBG Herbarium, Royal Botanical Gardens	66,000	HAM	Ontario	Burlington	
University of Lethbridge Herbarium, University of Lethbridge	21,800	LEA	Alberta	Lethbridge	

== Central America and the Caribbean ==
The table below lists herbaria located in Central America and the Caribbean.

Herbaria in Central America
Name	No. Specimens	Code	Country	City	Website
Instituto de Ecología y Sistemática	400,000	HAC	Cuba	Havana	
Herbario Paul C. Standley, Escuela Agrícola Panamericana	240,000	EAP	Honduras	Tegucigalpa	
Herbario Nacional, Museo Nacional de Costa Rica	215,000	CR	Costa Rica	San José	
Institute of Jamaica	125,000	IJ	Jamaica	Kingston	
Instituto Nacional de Biodiversidad	110,000	INB	Costa Rica	Santo Domingo de Heredia	
Herbario Prof. Dr. J. Bisse, Jardín Botánico Nacional	100,000	HAJB	Cuba	Havana	
Jardín Botánico Nacional Dr. Rafael M. Moscoso	100,000	JBSD	Dominican Republic	Santo Domingo	
Centro Oriental de Ecosistemas y Biodiversidad	92,000	BSC	Cuba	Santiago de Cuba	
Herbario Luis A. Fournier, Universidad de Costa Rica	90,000	USJ	Costa Rica	San José	
University of San Carlos of Guatemala	84,000	AGUAT, BIGU, USCG	Guatemala	Guatemala City	
The National Herbarium of Trinidad and Tobago	70,000	TRIN	Trinidad	St. Augustine	
University of Panama	67,000	PMA	Panama	Panama City	
Cyril Hardy Nelson-Sutherland Herbarium, National Autonomous University of Honduras	45,000	TEFH	Honduras	Tegucigalpa	
University of Puerto Rico	43,000	UPRRP	Puerto Rico (USA)	San Juan	
Universidad de El Salvador	35,000	ITIC	El Salvador	San Salvador	
University of the West Indies	34,000	UCWI	Jamaica	Kingston	
Herbario Rafael M. Moscoso, Pontificia Universidad Católica Madre y Maestra	25,000	UCMM	Dominican Republic	Santiago de los Caballeros	
Universidad del Valle de Guatemala	25,000	UVAL	Guatemala	Guatemala City	
National Autonomous University of Nicaragua	25,000	HULE	Nicaragua	León	
Asociación Jardín Botánico La Laguna, Urbanización Plan de La Laguna	25,000	LAGU	El Salvador	La Libertad	
Herbario Juvenal Valerio Rodríguez, National University of Costa Rica	15,000	JVR	Costa Rica	Heredia	
Herbario Nacional de Nicaragua, Universidad Centroamericana	15,000	HNMN	Nicaragua	Managua	
Smithsonian Tropical Research Institute	15,000	SCZ, STRI	Panama	Balboa	
Forest Department Herbarium, Ministry of Natural Resources, Local Government, and the Environment	10,000	BRH	Belize	Belmopan	
Rafael M. Moscoso Herbarium, Universidad Autónoma de Santo Domingo	10,000	USD	Dominican Republic	Santo Domingo	

== Mexico ==
Herbaria in Mexico
Name	No. Specimens	Code	State	City	Website
Universidad Nacional Autónoma de México	1,120,000	MEXU	Distrito Federal	Mexico City	
Instituto Politécnico Naciona, Mexico	950,000	ENCB	Distrito Federal	Mexico City	
Instituto de Ecología, A.C.	310,000	XAL	Veracruz	Xalapa	
Universidad de Guadalajara	169,000	IBUG	Jalisco	Zapopan	

== United States ==
Herbaria in the United States
Name	Affiliated With	No. Specimens	Code	State	City	Website	LSID
William and Lynda Steere Herbarium	New York Botanical Garden	7,300,000	NY	New York	Bronx, New York City		
Missouri Botanical Garden Herbarium	Missouri Botanical Garden	6,370,000	MO	Missouri	St. Louis		
Harvard University Herbaria	Harvard University	5,005,000	A, AMES, ECON, FH, GH	Massachusetts	Cambridge		
United States National Herbarium	Smithsonian Institution	4,340,000	US	District of Columbia	Washington		
Field Museum Herbarium	Field Museum	2,650,000	F	Illinois	Chicago		
University and Jepson Herbaria	University of California, Berkeley	2,200,000	UC/JEPS	California	Berkeley		
California Academy of Sciences Herbarium	California Academy of Sciences	2,300,000	CAS, DS	California	San Francisco		
University of Michigan Herbarium	University of Michigan	1,700,000	MICH	Michigan	Ann Arbor		
Academy of Natural Sciences Herbarium	Academy of Natural Sciences	1,430,000	PH	Pennsylvania	Philadelphia		
Wisconsin State Herbarium	University of Wisconsin–Madison	1,100,000	WIS	Wisconsin	Madison		
Rancho Santa Ana Botanic Garden Herbarium	Rancho Santa Ana Botanic Garden	1,230,000	RSA	California	Claremont		
University of Texas at Austin Herbarium and the Lundell Herbarium	University of Texas at Austin	1,006,000	TEX/LL	Texas	Austin		
Botanical Research Institute of Texas Herbarium	Fort Worth Botanic Garden	1,445,000	BRIT	Texas	Fort Worth		
L.H. Bailey Hortorium Herbarium	Cornell University	845,000	BH	New York	Ithaca		
Rocky Mountain Herbarium	University of Wyoming	806,800	RM	Wyoming	Laramie		
Duke University Herbarium	Duke University	800,000	DUKE	North Carolina	Durham		
United States National Arboretum Herbarium	United States National Arboretum	800,000	NA	District of Columbia	Washington		
University of North Carolina Herbarium	University of North Carolina at Chapel Hill North Carolina Botanical Garden	750,000	NCU	North Carolina	Chapel Hill		
Oregon State University Herbarium	Oregon State University	700,000	OSC	Oregon	Corvallis		
S.L. Welsh Herbarium	Brigham Young University	661,100	BRY	Utah	Provo		
University of Washington Herbarium	University of Washington	650,000	WTU	Washington	Seattle		
University of Tennessee Herbarium	University of Tennessee, Knoxville	650,000	TENN	Tennessee	Knoxville		
University of Illinois Herbaria housed at Illinois Natural History Survey (INHS, University, and Crop Evolution Lab Collections)	University of Illinois, Urbana-Champaign	1,500,000	ILLS, ILL, CEL	Illinois	Champaign		
Ada Hayden Herbarium	Iowa State University	640,000	ISC	Iowa	Ames		
Herbarium Pacificum	Bishop Museum	600,000	BISH	Hawaii	Honolulu		
Willard Sherman Turrell Herbarium	Miami University	570,000	MU	Ohio	Oxford		
University of Colorado Museum of Natural History Herbarium	University of Colorado	565,000	COLO	Colorado	Boulder		
Michigan State University Herbarium	Michigan State University	560,000	MSC	Michigan	East Lansing		
Carnegie Museum of Natural History Herbarium	Carnegie Museum of Natural History	525,000	CM	Pennsylvania	Pittsburgh		
The Ohio State University Herbarium	The Ohio State University	500,000	OS	Ohio	Columbus		
University of Florida Herbarium	Florida Museum of Natural History University of Florida	470,000	FLAS	Florida	Gainesville		
University of Louisiana at Monroe Herbarium	University of Louisiana at Monroe	430,000	NLU	Louisiana	Monroe		
University of Arizona Herbarium	University of Arizona	400,000	ARIZ	Arizona	Tucson		
Cornell Plant Pathology Herbarium	Cornell University	370,000	CUP	New York	Ithaca		
Yale University Herbarium	Peabody Museum of Natural History Yale University	365,000	YU	Connecticut	New Haven		
Arizona State University Herbarium	Arizona State University	360,000	ASU	Arizona	Tempe		
Pringle Herbarium	University of Vermont	350,000	VT	Vermont	Burlington		
Brooklyn Botanic Garden Herbarium	Brooklyn Botanic Garden	310,000	BKL	New York	Brooklyn		
UC Davis Center for Plant Diversity	University of California, Davis	300,000	DAV, DAVH, AHUC	California	Davis		
New York State Museum Herbarium	New York State Museum	278,662	NYS	New York	Albany		
University of Georgia Herbarium	University of Georgia	278,000	GA	Georgia	Athens		
University of Alaska Museum of the North Herbarium	University of Alaska Museum of the North	270,000	ALA	Alaska	Fairbanks		
Milwaukee Public Museum Herbarium	Milwaukee Public Museum	250,000	MIL	Wisconsin	Milwaukee		
North Dakota State University Herbarium	North Dakota State University	250,000	NDA	North Dakota	Fargo		
Southern Illinois University Herbarium	Southern Illinois University	250,000	SIU	Illinois	Carbondale		
Intermountain Herbarium	Utah State University	299,000	UTC	Utah	Logan		
Diatom Herbarium	Academy of Natural Sciences of Philadelphia	245,000	ANSP	Pennsylvania	Philadelphia		
University of South Florida Herbarium	University of South Florida	235,000	USF	Florida	Tampa		
Robert Bebb Herbarium	University of Oklahoma	210,000	OKL	Oklahoma	Norman		
West Virginia University Herbarium	West Virginia University	210,000	WVA	West Virginia	Morgantown		
R.K. Godfrey Herbarium	Florida State University	206,000	FSU	Florida	Tallahassee		
Robert W. Freckmann Herbarium	University of Wisconsin–Stevens Point	200,000	UWSP	Wisconsin	Stevens Point		
Stillinger Herbarium	College of Idaho	200,000	ID	Idaho	Moscow		
Morton Arboretum Herbarium	Morton Arboretum	180,000	MOR	Illinois	Lisle		
Fairchild Tropical Botanic Garden Herbarium	Fairchild Tropical Botanic Garden	165,000	FTG	Florida	Coral Gables		
Louisiana State University Herbarium	Louisiana State University	159,000	LSU	Louisiana	Baton Rouge		
Chrysler Herbarium	Rutgers University	151,000	CHRB	New Jersey	New Brunswick		
San Diego Natural History Museum Herbarium	San Diego Natural History Museum	150,000	SD	California	San Diego		
United States National Seed Herbarium	United States National Arboretum	140,000	BARC	District of Columbia	Washington		
Indiana University Herbarium	Indiana University	140,000	IND	Indiana	Bloomington		
Oklahoma State University Herbarium	Oklahoma State University	140,000	OKLA	Oklahoma	Stillwater		
Harry D. Thiers Herbarium	San Francisco State University	140,000	SFSU	California	San Francisco		
Robert L. Gilbertson Mycological Herbarium	University of Arizona	140,000		Tucson	Arizona		
Austin Peay State University Herbarium		138,000	APSC	Tennessee	Clarksville		
University of New Mexico Herbarium	University of New Mexico	134,000	UNM	New Mexico	Albuquerque		
Humboldt State University Herbarium		132,000	HSC	California	Arcata		
North Carolina State University Herbarium		125,000	NCSC	North Carolina	Raleigh		
Louisiana Tech University Herbarium		122,635	LTU	Louisiana	Ruston		
Santa Barbara Botanic Garden Herbarium		120,000	SBBG	California	Santa Barbara		
Massey Herbarium	Virginia Tech	116,000	VPI	Virginia	Blacksburg		
Clinton Herbarium	Buffalo Museum of Science	115,000	BUF	New York	Buffalo		
Carl F. Chuey Herbarium	Youngstown State University	115,000	YUO	Ohio	Youngstown		
Illinois State Museum Herbarium		114,000	ISM	Illinois	Springfield		
Claude E. Phillips Herbarium	Delaware State University	110,000	DOV	Delaware	Dover		
A.C. Moore Herbarium	University of South Carolina	110,000	USCH	South Carolina	Columbia		
Eastern Kentucky University Herbarium		103,000	EKY, BEREA	Kentucky	Richmond		
Arthur Herbarium	Purdue University	101,000	PUR	Indiana	West Lafayette		
Steven T. Olney Herbarium	Brown University	100,000	BRU	Rhode Island	Providence		
Friesner Herbarium	Butler University	100,000	BUT	Indiana	Indianapolis		
Pennsylvania State University Herbarium		107,000	PAC	Pennsylvania	University Park		
Sul Ross State University Herbarium		100,000	SRSC	Texas	Alpine		
California State University Herbarium	California State University, Chico	98,000	CHSC	California	Chico		
State University of New York Herbarium	SUNY College of Environmental Science and Forestry	95,500	SYRF	New York	Syracuse		
American Type Culture Collection Culture Collection		92,000	ATCC	Virginia	Manassas		
Marie Selby Botanical Gardens Herbarium		92,000	SEL	Florida	Sarasota		
Montana State University Herbarium		85,000	MONT	Montana	Bozeman		
Pacific Union College Herbarium		85,000	PUA	California	Angwin		
Colorado State University Herbarium		80,000	CS	Colorado	Fort Collins		
National Center for Agricultural Utilization Research, USDA/ARS ARS Culture Collection		80,000	NRRL	Illinois	Peoria		
Deaver Herbarium	Northern Arizona University	80,000	ASC	Arizona	Flagstaff		
Stephen F. Austin State University Herbarium		78,000	ASTC	Texas	Nacogdoches		
Stover-Ebinger Herbarium	Eastern Illinois University	77,000	EIU	Illinois	Charleston		
Tom S. and Miwako K. Cooperrider Herbarium	Kent State University	76,000	KE	Ohio	Kent		
Longwood University Herbarium		75,000	FARM	Virginia	Farmville		
Kriebel Herbarium	Purdue University	75,000	PUL	Indiana	West Lafayette		
Emporia State University Herbarium		70,000	KSTC	Kansas	Emporia		
New Mexico State University Herbarium		70,000	NMC	New Mexico	Las Cruces		
Wesley Niles Herbarium	College of Southern Nevada	70,000	UNLV	Nevada	Henderson		
Muhlenberg College Herbarium		65,000	MCA	Pennsylvania	Allentown		
John D. Freeman Herbarium	Auburn University	64,000	AUA	Alabama	Auburn		
Desert Botanical Garden Herbarium	Desert Botanical Garden	66,000	DES	Arizona	Phoenix		
Ozarks Regional Herbarium	Missouri State University	62,181	SMS	Missouri	Springfield		
Robert F. Hoover Herbarium	California Polytechnic State University	62,000	OBI	California	San Luis Obispo		
Baylor University Herbarium	Baylor University	61,000	BAYLU	Texas	Waco		
Chadron State College Herbarium		60,789	CSCN	Nebraska	Chadron		
Clemson University Herbarium		60,000	CLEMS	South Carolina	Clemson		
Cleveland Museum of Natural History Herbarium		78,000	CLM	Ohio	Cleveland		
Ted R. Bradley Herbarium	George Mason University	60,000	GMUF	Virginia	Fairfax		
Illinois State University Herbarium		60,000	ISU	Illinois	Normal		
Ramsey-Freer Herbarium	University of Lynchburg	60,000	LYN	Virginia	Lynchburg		
Ray J. Davis Herbarium	Idaho State University	60,000	IDS	Idaho	Pocatello		
Rochester Academy of Science Herbarium		60,000	ROCH	New York	Rochester		
Smith College Herbarium		60,000	SCHN	Massachusetts	Northampton		
Billington Herbarium	Cranbrook Institute of Science	57,905	BLH	Michigan	Bloomfield Hills		
Theodore M. Sperry Herbarium	Pittsburg State University	65,500	KSP	Kansas	Pittsburg		
San Juan College Herbarium		55,000	SJNM	New Mexico	Farmington		
University of Kentucky Herbarium		50,000	KY	Kentucky	Lexington		
Desert Botanical Garden Herbarium		54,000	DES	Arizona	Phoenix		
Marshall University Herbarium		50,000	MUHW	West Virginia	Huntington		
National Tropical Botanical Garden Herbarium		50,000	PTBG	Hawaii	Kalaheo, Kauai		
Towson University Herbarium		50,000	BALT	Maryland	Towson		
Clark University Herbarium		47,000	CUW	Massachusetts	Worcester		
Ohio University Herbarium		46,000	BHO	Ohio	Athens		
Angelo State University Herbarium		45,000	SAT	Texas	San Angelo		
Central Wyoming College Herbarium		45,000	CWC	Wyoming	Riverton		
Fay A. MacFadden Herbarium	California State University, Fullerton	43,310	MACF	California	Fullerton		
Kathryn Kalmbach Herbarium	Denver Botanic Gardens	42,000	KHD	Colorado	Denver		
Mecklenburg County Park and Recreation Herbarium		42,000	UNCC	North Carolina	Charlotte		
Mississippi State University Herbarium		40,500	MISSA	Mississippi	Mississippi State		
Murray State University Herbarium		40,500	MUR	Kentucky	Murray		
Forest Products Laboratory Herbarium		40,000	CFMR	Wisconsin	Madison		
Howard Payne University Herbarium		40,000	HPC	Texas	Brownwood		
Robert A. Vines Environmental Science Center Herbarium		40,000	SBSC	Texas	Houston		
Harold M. Tucker Herbarium		39,000	CIC	Idaho	Caldwell		
California State University Herbarium	California State University, Los Angeles	37,000	CSLA	California	Los Angeles		
Fort Hays State University Herbarium		36,000	FHKSC	Kansas	Hays		
California Department of Food and Agriculture Herbarium		35,000	CDA	California	Sacramento		
California State University Herbarium	California State University, Fresno	35,000	FSC	California	Fresno		
Walter B. McDougall Herbarium	Museum of Northern Arizona	35,000	MNA	Arizona	Flagstaff		
Northern Kentucky University Herbarium		35,000	KNK	Kentucky	Highland Heights		
South Dakota State University Herbarium		35,000	SDC	South Dakota	Brookings		
Jacksonville State University Herbarium		31,265	JSU	Alabama	Jacksonville		
Julian H. Miller Mycological Herbarium	Georgia Museum of Natural History University of Georgia	30,000	GAM	Georgia	Athens		
Black Hills State University Herbarium		30,000	BHSC	South Dakota	Spearfish		
Boise State University Herbarium		30,000	SRP	Idaho	Boise		
Chicago Academy of Sciences Herbarium		30,000	CACS	Illinois	Chicago		
Morris Arboretum Herbarium	University of Pennsylvania	30,000	MOAR	Pennsylvania	Philadelphia		
Nicholls State University Herbarium		30,000	THIB	Louisiana	Thibodaux		
Southwest Texas State University Herbarium		30,000	SWT	Texas	San Marcos		
University of Tennessee at Chattanooga Herbarium		55,000	UCHT	Tennessee	Chattanooga		
Nevada State Museum Herbarium		28,500	NSMC	Nevada	Carson City		
Old Dominion University Herbarium		28,000	ODU	Virginia	Norfolk		
Smithsonian Institution Herbarium		28,000	USNC	District of Columbia	Washington		
St. Cloud State University Herbarium		28,000	SCL	Minnesota	St. Cloud		
St. John's University/College of Saint Benedict Herbarium		28,000	CSB	Minnesota	Collegeville		
CSU Center for Environmental Management of Military Lands Herbarium		35,000	CMML	Colorado	Fort Collins		
Naples Botanical Garden Herbarium		27,000	SWF	Florida	Naples		
Southern Illinois University Hepatic Herbarium		27,000	ABSH	Illinois	Carbondale		
Central Michigan University Herbarium		26,000	CMC	Michigan	Mount Pleasant		
Denison University Herbarium		26,000	DEN	Ohio	Granville		
Morehead State University Herbarium		26,000	MDKY	Kentucky	Morehead		
Tennessee Technological University Herbarium		25,000	HTTU	Tennessee	Cookeville		
Arkansas State University Herbarium		25,000	STAR	Arkansas	State University		
Central Washington University Herbarium		25,000	ELRG	Washington	Ellensburg		
Charleston Museum Herbarium		25,000	CHARL	South Carolina	Charleston		
Connecticut Agricultural Experiment Station Herbarium		25,000	NHES	Connecticut	New Haven		
Eastern Michigan University Herbarium		25,000	EMC	Michigan	Ypsilanti		
Knox College Herbarium		25,000	KNOX	Illinois	Galesburg		
Bernard Lowy Mycological Herbarium	Louisiana State University	25,000	LSUM	Louisiana	Baton Rouge		
Massachusetts College of Liberal Arts Herbarium		25,000	NASC	Massachusetts	North Adams		
Range Science Herbarium	New Mexico State University	25,000	NMCR	New Mexico	Las Cruces		
North Coast Herbarium of California	Sonoma State University	25,000	NCC	California	Rohnert Park		
Staten Island Institute of Arts and Sciences Herbarium		25,000	SIM	New York	Staten Island		
Grinnell College Herbarium		24,000	GRI	Iowa	Grinnell		
Muskingum University Herbarium		23,000	MUS	Ohio	New Concord		
Pennsylvania Department of Agriculture Herbarium		23,000	PAM	Pennsylvania	Harrisburg		
Middle Tennessee State University Herbarium		23,000	MTSU	Tennessee	Murfreesboro		
Northeast Missouri Herbarium	Truman State University	23,000	NEMO	Missouri	Kirksville		
Colorado College Herbarium		22,500	COCO	Colorado	Colorado Springs		
North Museum of Natural History and Science Herbarium		22,380	FMC	Pennsylvania	Lancaster		
Northern Illinois University Herbarium		22,000	DEK	Illinois	DeKalb		
Denver Botanic Gardens Mycology Laboratory and Herbarium		21,000	DBG	Colorado	Denver		
Wayne E. Manning Herbarium	Bucknell University	20,000	BUPL	Pennsylvania	Lewisburg		
William Darlington Herbarium	West Chester University	20,000	DWC	Pennsylvania	West Chester	[610]	[611]
California State University Herbarium	California State University, Northridge	20,000	SFV	California	Northridge		
Carleton College Herbarium		20,000	CARL	Minnesota	Northfield		
Fairmont State University Herbarium		20,000	FWVA	West Virginia	Fairmont		
Furman University Herbarium		20,000	FUGR	South Carolina	Greenville		
Georgia Southern University Herbarium		20,000	GAS	Georgia	Statesboro		
Hoysradt Herbarium	Hartwick College	20,000	HHH	New York	Oneonta		
Lord Fairfax Community College Herbarium		20,000	LFCC	Virginia	Middletown		
D. T. MacRoberts Herbarium	Louisiana State University	20,000	LSUS	Louisiana	Shreveport		
Northwestern State University Herbarium		20,000	NATC	Louisiana	Natchitoches		
South Plains College Herbarium		20,000	SPLT	Texas	Levelland		
Luman Andrews Herbarium	Springfield Science Museum	19,000	SPR	Massachusetts	Springfield		
University of Memphis Herbarium	University of Memphis	19,000	MEM	Tennessee	Memphis		
Emory University Herbarium		18,805	GEO	Georgia	Atlanta		
Arkansas Tech University Herbarium		18,000	APCR	Arkansas	Russellville		
Steven Pearl Lathrop Herbarium	Beloit College	18,000	BELC	Wisconsin	Beloit		
Fort Lewis College Herbarium		17,200	FLD	Colorado	Durango		
Ball State University Herbarium		17,000	BSUH	Indiana	Muncie		
East Tennessee State University Herbarium		17,000	ETSU	Tennessee	Johnson City		
Missouri Southern State University Herbarium		17,000	MCJ	Missouri	Joplin		
Newberry College Herbarium		16,500	NBYC	South Carolina	Newberry		
St. Martin's College Herbarium		16,500	OSMC	Washington	Lacey		
Mississippi Museum of Natural Science Herbarium		16,480	MMNS	Mississippi	Jackson		
Idaho Herbarium	Brigham Young University	16,000	RICK	Idaho	Rexburg		
Billings Herbarium	Montana State University	16,000	MSUB	Montana	Billings		
Northeastern University Herbarium		16,000	HNUB	Massachusetts	Boston		
Jason Swallen Herbarium	Ohio Wesleyan University	16,000	OWU	Ohio	Delaware		
S. R. Warner Herbarium	Sam Houston State University	16,000	SHST	Texas	Huntsville		
Slippery Rock University Herbarium		16,000	SLRO	Pennsylvania	Slippery Rock		
Monroe County Department of Parks Herbarium		15,720	HPH	New York	Rochester		
Henderson State University Herbarium		15,500	HEND	Arkansas	Arkadelphia		
Alma College Herbarium		15,000	ALMA	Michigan	Alma		
George R. Cooley Herbarium	Colgate University	15,000	GRCH	New York	Hamilton		
Delta Institute of Natural History Herbarium		15,000	DINH	Maine	Bowdoin		
Earlham College Herbarium		15,000	EAR	Indiana	Richmond		
Fairbanks Museum and Planetarium Herbarium		15,000	SJFM	Vermont	St. Johnsbury		
Gulf Coast Research Laboratory Herbarium		15,000	HGCRL	Mississippi	Ocean Springs		
James Madison University Herbarium		15,000	JMUH	Virginia	Harrisonburg		
Keene State College Herbarium		15,000	KESC	New Hampshire	Keene		
Occidental College Herbarium		15,000	LOC	California	Los Angeles		
Parasitic Seed Plants Herbarium		15,000	PSP	West Virginia	Burlington		
Potato Introduction Station Herbarium		15,000	PTIS	Wisconsin	Sturgeon Bay		
San Diego State University Herbarium		15,000	SDSU	California	San Diego		
Carl Sharsmith Herbarium	San Jose State University	15,000	SJSU	California	San Jose		
Toney Keeney Herbarium	Southwest Texas Junior College	14,372	UVST	Texas	Uvalde		
Bowling Green State University Herbarium		14,000	BGSU	Ohio	Bowling Green		
Southeast Missouri State University Herbarium		14,000	SEMO	Missouri	Cape Girardeau		
Southern Oregon University Herbarium		14,000	SOC	Oregon	Ashland		
California State University Herbarium	California State University, Sacramento	13,000	SACT	California	Sacramento		
Carthage College Herbarium		13,000	CART	Wisconsin	Kenosha		
Georgia Southwestern State University Herbarium		13,000	GSW	Georgia	Americus		
Randolph College Herbarium		13,000	RMWC	Virginia	Lynchburg		
Rocky Mountain Research Station Herbarium		13,000	MRC	Montana	Missoula		
Charles B. Graves Herbarium	Connecticut College	12,500	CCNL	Connecticut	New London		
Andrews University Herbarium		12,000	AUB	Michigan	Berrien Springs		
California State University Herbarium	California State University, Long Beach	12,000	LOB	California	Long Beach		
Delta State University Herbarium		12,000	DSC	Mississippi	Cleveland		
Huntington University Herbarium	Huntington University	12,000	HUNT	Indiana	Huntington		
Rocky Mountain Research Station Forest Pathology Herbarium	USDA Forest Service	12,000	FPF	Colorado	Fort Collins		
Southeastern Louisiana University Herbarium		12,000	SELU	Louisiana	Hammond		
Central Missouri State University Herbarium		11,854	WARM	Missouri	Warrensburg		
Michigan Technological University Herbarium		11,710	MCTC	Michigan	Houghton		
Lyndon State College Herbarium		11,500	LSC	Vermont	Lyndonville		
Planting Fields Arboretum State Historic Park Herbarium		11,500	OBPF	New York	Oyster Bay		
Saint Bonaventure University Herbarium		11,083	SBU	New York	St. Bonaventure		
Forest Service, USDA Herbarium		11,000	FSSR	Georgia	Atlanta		
Nancy Poole Rich Herbarium	Chicago Botanic Garden	10,500	CHIC	Illinois	Glencoe		
Western Oklahoma Herbarium	Southwestern Oklahoma State University	10,500	WOH	Oklahoma	Weatherford		
Stetson University Herbarium		10,500	DLF	Florida	DeLand		
Adams State College Herbarium		10,000	ALAM	Colorado	Alamosa		
Albion College Herbarium		10,000	ALBC	Michigan	Albion		
Stuart K. Harris Herbarium	Boston University	10,000	BSN	Massachusetts	Boston		
Columbus State University Herbarium		10,000	COLG	Georgia	Columbus		
Indiana State University Herbarium		10,000	TER	Indiana	Terre Haute		
Arthur G. Shields Herbarium	Indiana University of Pennsylvania	10,000	IUP	Pennsylvania	Indiana		
Hells Canyon Herbarium	Lewis–Clark State College	10,000	HCH	Idaho	Lewiston		
Moorhead State University Herbarium		10,000	MRD	Minnesota	Moorhead		
Navajo Nation Herbarium	Navajo Nation/Northern Arizona University	10,000	NAVA	Arizona	Window Rock		
North Carolina A & T State University Herbarium		10,000	NCATG	North Carolina	Greensboro		
Northwest Missouri State University Herbarium	Northwest Missouri State University	10,000	NMSU	Missouri	Maryville		
Norwich University Herbarium	Norwich University	10,000	NUV	Vermont	Northfield		
Our Lady of the Lake University Herbarium	Our Lady of the Lake University	10,000	LLC	Texas	San Antonio		
Pacific Southwest Research Station Herbarium	USDA Forest Service	10,000	IFGP	California	Placerville		
Putnam Museum of History and Natural Science Herbarium		10,000	BDI	Iowa	Davenport		
Reading Public Museum Herbarium		10,000	RPM	Pennsylvania	Reading		
Roger Williams Park Herbarium		10,000	RWPM	Rhode Island	Providence		
Heraly MacDonald Herbarium	St. Norbert College	10,000	SNC	Wisconsin	De Pere		
Shasta College Herbarium		10,000	RESC	California	Redding		
State University of New York Herbarium	Binghamton University	10,000	BING	New York	Binghamton		
Rocky Mountain Research Station Herbarium	USDA Forest Service	9,500	ASUF	Arizona	Flagstaff		
Botanical Research Center Herbarium		9,000	BRCH	Texas	Bryan		
College of the Ozarks Herbarium		9,000	SOTO	Missouri	Point Lookout		
Gilbert M. Smith Herbarium	Hopkins Marine Station, Stanford University	9,000	GMS	California	Pacific Grove		
Huntington Botanical Gardens Herbarium		9,000	HNT	California	San Marino		
Marine Biological Laboratory Herbarium		9,000	SPWH	Massachusetts	Woods Hole		
Rhodes College Herbarium		9,000	SWMT	Tennessee	Memphis		
Sewanee Herbarium	Sewanee: The University of the South	9,000	UOS	Tennessee	Sewanee		
St. Andrews University Herbarium		9,000	SAPCL	North Carolina	Laurinburg		
State University of New York College at Cortland Herbarium		9,000	CORT	New York	Cortland		
Rocky Mountain Research Station Herbarium		8,807	BOIS	Idaho	Boise		
South Florida Collections Management Center Herbarium	Everglades National Park	8,600	FNPS	Florida	Homestead		
Dayton Museum of Natural History Herbarium		8,500	DMNH	Ohio	Dayton		
Adrian College Herbarium		8,150	ADR	Michigan	Adrian		
Dakota Wesleyan University Herbarium		8,000	DWU	South Dakota	Mitchell		
Division of State Parks Herbarium		8,000	MODNR	Missouri	Jefferson City		
Eastern Oregon University Herbarium		8,000	EOSC	Oregon	La Grande		
Florida Department of Agriculture and Consumer Services Herbarium		8,000	PIHG	Florida	Gainesville		
Grand Canyon National Park Museum Collection Herbarium		8,000	GCNP	Arizona	Grand Canyon		
Longwood Gardens Herbarium		8,000	KEN	Pennsylvania	Kennett Square		
Pacific Grove Museum of Natural History Herbarium		8,000	PGM	California	Pacific Grove		
Peabody Essex Museum Herbarium		8,000	PM	Massachusetts	Salem		
Nevada Operations Office Herbarium	U.S. Department of Energy	7,787	NTS	Nevada	Las Vegas		
Great Smoky Mountains National Park Herbarium		7,700	GSMNP	Tennessee	Gatlinburg		
Converse University Herbarium		7,500	CONV	South Carolina	Spartanburg		
Florida Southern College Herbarium		7,500	FSCL	Florida	Lakeland		
Hope College Herbarium		7,500	HCHM	Michigan	Holland		
Howard University Herbarium		7,500	HUDC	District of Columbia	Washington		
Orange County Department of Agriculture Herbarium		7,400	ANA	California	Anaheim		
Orville Bissett Herbarium	Central Connecticut State University	7,380	CCSU	Connecticut	New Britain		
National Park Service Herbarium		7,200	YM	California	Yosemite National Park		
Kellogg Biological Station Herbarium	Michigan State University	7,079	KBSMS	Michigan	Hickory Corners		
Uinta Herbarium	Bureau of Land Management	7,000	UI	Utah	Vernal		
Jesup Herbarium	Dartmouth College	7,000	HNH	New Hampshire	Hanover		
Gesneriad Gardens Herbarium		7,000	GGB	Colorado	Longmont		
Nantucket Maria Mitchell Association Herbarium		7,000	NMMA	Massachusetts	Nantucket		
Rocky Mountain Research Station Herbarium		7,000	SSLP	Utah	Provo		
Cameron University Herbarium		6,675	CAMU	Oklahoma	Lawton		
Oscar Scherer State Park Herbarium		6,621	FLSP	Florida	Osprey		
Archbold Biological Station Herbarium		6,500	ARCH	Florida	Lake Placid		
California State University Herbarium	California State University, East Bay	6,500	HAY	California	Hayward		
Harbor Branch Oceanographic Institute Herbarium		6,500	HBFH	Florida	Fort Pierce		
Radford University Herbarium		6,500	RUHV	Virginia	Radford		
Francis Marion University Herbarium		6,300	FMUH	South Carolina	Florence		
Michael Wirth Herbarium	New England College	6,210	NHNE	New Hampshire	Henniker		
Charles O. Wingo, Jr. Herbarium	Salisbury University	6,200	SUHC	Maryland	Salisbury		
Southern Forest Range Program Herbarium	Southern Research Station	6,200	SFRP	Louisiana	Pineville		
Baylor University Herbarium		6,000	SRCG	Texas	Gruver		
Bureau of Land Management Herbarium		6,000	BLMLK	Oregon	Lakeview		
Chaffey College Herbarium		6,000	CHAF	California	Alta Loma		
Elmira College Herbarium		6,000	ECH	New York	Elmira		
Iowa Lakeside Laboratory Herbarium		6,000	ILH	Iowa	Milford		
Leo Galloway Herbarium	Missouri Western State University	6,000	MWSJ	Missouri	St. Joseph		
Northern Michigan University Herbarium		6,000	NM	Michigan	Marquette		
Northern Prairie Research Center Herbarium		6,000	NPWRC	North Dakota	Jamestown		
State University of New York at Oneonta Herbarium		6,000	SUCO	New York	Oneonta		
Snow College Herbarium		5,990	EPHR	Utah	Ephraim		
Colorado Mesa University Herbarium		5,700	MESA	Colorado	Grand Junction		
James C. Parks Herbarium	Millersville University	22,877	MVSC	Pennsylvania	Millersville		
Oral Roberts University Herbarium		5,700	ORU	Oklahoma	Tulsa		
Rob & Bessie Welder Wildlife Foundation Herbarium		5,600	WWF	Texas	Sinton		
Aquinas College Herbarium		5,500	AQC	Michigan	Grand Rapids		
Lincoln Memorial University Herbarium		5,500	LNCN	Tennessee	Harrogate		
Hardin–Simmons University Herbarium		5,500	HSU	Texas	Abilene		
Marvin A. Bichel Herbarium	Nebraska Wesleyan University	5,500	HNWU	Nebraska	Lincoln		
Joe M. Anderson Herbarium	Northeastern State University	5,170	NOSU	Oklahoma	Tahlequah		
Davis and Elkins College Herbarium		5,120	DEWV	West Virginia	Elkins		
Birmingham Botanical Gardens Herbarium		5,100	BBG	Alabama	Birmingham		
Pacific Southwest Forest and Range Experiment Station Forest Disease Herbarium		5,100	PFRS	California	Berkeley		
Augustana University Herbarium		5,000	AUG	South Dakota	Sioux Falls		
College of the Atlantic Herbarium	College of the Atlantic and Acadia National Park	13,000	HCOA	Maine	Bar Harbor		
College of the Redwoods, Mendocino Coast Campus Herbarium		5,000	CRMC	California	Fort Bragg		
Crater Lake National Park Herbarium		5,000	CRLA	Oregon	Crater Lake		
East Central University Herbarium		5,000	ECSC	Oklahoma	Ada		
University of Tennessee at Martin		5,000	UTM	Tennessee	Martin		
Flathead Valley Community College Herbarium		5,000	FVCC	Montana	Kalispell		
Hendrix College Herbarium		5,000	HXC	Arkansas	Conway		
High Point University Herbarium		5,000	HPU	North Carolina	High Point		
Indiana University Southeast Herbarium		5,000	JEF	Indiana	New Albany		
Lamar University Herbarium		5,000	LAMU	Texas	Beaumont		
Los Angeles Valley College Herbarium		5,000	VNC	California	Van Nuys		
McNeese State University Herbarium		5,000	MCN	Louisiana	Lake Charles		
Shorter University Herbarium		5,000	SHOR	Georgia	Rome		
Bridger-Teton National Forest Herbarium		4,935	BTJW	Wyoming	Jackson		
New England Wild Flower Society Herbarium		4,500	BEDF	Massachusetts	Framingham		
Santa Clara University Herbarium		4,500	SACL	California	Santa Clara		
Bridgewater College Herbarium		4,293	BDWR	Virginia	Bridgewater		
California State University Stanislaus Herbarium		4,000	SHTC	California	Turlock		
Clinch Valley College, University of Virginia Herbarium		4,000	CVCW	Virginia	Wise		
College of Eastern Utah Herbarium		4,000	PRI	Utah	Price		
University of Mary Washington Herbarium		4,000	MWCF	Virginia	Fredericksburg		
Darlene and William Radichel Herbarium	Minnesota State University, Mankato	4,000	MANK	Minnesota	Mankato		
Swarthmore College Herbarium		4,000	SWC	Pennsylvania	Swarthmore		
Northwestern Oklahoma State University Herbarium		3,800	NWOSU	Oklahoma	Alva		
Salem International University Herbarium		3,600	SAWV	West Virginia	Salem		
Roanoke College Herbarium		3,544	SARC	Virginia	Salem		
Friday Harbor Laboratories Herbarium	University of Washington	3,500	FHL	Washington	Friday Harbor		
Grand Valley State University Herbarium		3,500	GVSC	Michigan	Allendale		
Middlebury College Herbarium	Middlebury College	3,500	MID	Vermont	Middlebury		
State University of New York Herbarium	SUNY Geneseo	3,500	GESU	New York	Geneseo		
Colby College Herbarium		3,300	WAVI	Maine	Waterville		
Manti-La Sal National Forest Herbarium		3,200	MALS	Utah	Price		
Oakland Museum of California Herbarium		3,200	OAKL	California	Oakland		
San Diego Mesa College Herbarium		3,200	SDM	California	San Diego		
Death Valley National Park Herbarium		3,148	DEVA	California	Death Valley		
Rowe-Love Herbarium	Lane Community College	3,100	LCEU	Oregon	Eugene		
Agnes Scott College Herbarium		3,000	DECA	Georgia	Decatur		
La Sierra University Herbarium		3,000	LOMA	California	Riverside		
Lassen Volcanic National Park Herbarium		3,000	LVNP	California	Mineral		
Newark Museum Herbarium		3,000	NEMU	New Jersey	Newark		
Seattle Pacific University Herbarium		3,000	SPC	Washington	Seattle		
Ash Mountain Herbarium	Sequoia and Kings Canyon National Parks	3,000	THRI	California	Three Rivers		
Santa Barbara City College Herbarium		2,900	SBCC	California	Santa Barbara		
Pasadena City College Herbarium		2,700	PASA	California	Pasadena		
Saint Mary's College Herbarium		2,650	WINO	Minnesota	Winona		
Mississippi University for Women Herbarium		2,600	MSCW	Mississippi	Columbus		
Grand Rapids Junior College Herbarium		2,537	GRJC	Michigan	Grand Rapids		
California State Polytechnic University Herbarium		2,500	CSPU	California	Pomona		
Eastern Mennonite University Herbarium		2,500	HAVI	Virginia	Harrisonburg		
Emory and Henry University Herbarium		2,500	EHCV	Virginia	Emory		
Florida Atlantic University Herbarium		2,500	FAU	Florida	Davie		
Fox Research Forest Herbarium		2,500	SPH	New Hampshire	Hillsborough		
Mills College Herbarium		2,500	OMC	California	Oakland		
Oregon State University Herbarium		2,500	OSUF	Oregon	Corvallis		
Palomar College Herbarium		2,500	PASM	California	San Marcos		
Isle Royale National Park Herbarium		2,200	IRP	Michigan	Houghton		
Anza-Borrego Desert State Park Herbarium		2,000	BSCA	California	Borrego Springs		
Pierce College Herbarium		2,000	LAPC	California	Woodland Hills		
Rutgers University Herbarium		2,000	NCAS	New Jersey	Newark		
Saint Meinrad College of Liberal Arts Herbarium		2,000	SMH	Indiana	Saint Meinrad		
Diablo Valley College Herbarium		1,908	DVM	California	Pleasant Hill		
State University of New York Herbarium	SUNY Brockport	1,670	BROC	New York	Brockport		
San Joaquin County Herbarium		1,650	SSJC	California	Stockton		
Everhart Museum Herbarium		1,534	EVMU	Pennsylvania	Scranton		
Gordon College Herbarium		1,502	WMGC	Massachusetts	Wenham		
Winnemucca District Herbarium	Bureau of Land Management	1,500	WDNE	Nevada	Winnemucca		
Cornell College Herbarium		1,500	MOVC	Iowa	Mount Vernon		
Hobart and William Smith Colleges Herbarium		1,500	DH	New York	Geneva		
Klamath National Forest Herbarium		1,500	KNFY	California	Yreka		
University of Olivet Herbarium		1,500	OLV	Michigan	Olivet		
Salem College Herbarium		1,500	SC	North Carolina	Winston-Salem		
Point Reyes National Seashore Herbarium		1,405	PORE	California	Point Reyes Station		
Mote Marine Laboratory Herbarium		1,369	MOT	Florida	Sarasota		
Benedictine College Herbarium		1,350	HWBA	Kansas	Atchison		
Nevada Division of Agriculture Herbarium		1,327	NSDA	Nevada	Reno		
Rocky Mountain Forest and Range Experiment Station Herbarium		1,222	ALBU	New Mexico	Albuquerque		
Kansas Wesleyan University Herbarium		1,100	SAL	Kansas	Salina		
Florida Marine Research Institute Herbarium		1,000	STPE	Florida	St. Petersburg		
Luther College Herbarium		1,000	LCDI	Iowa	Decorah		
Saint Michael's College Herbarium		1,000	SMCW	Vermont	Winooski		
Southern Research Station Herbarium		1,000	CHAS	South Carolina	Charleston		
Fishlake National Forest Herbarium		850	FNFR	Utah	Richfield		
Golden West College Herbarium		600	HUBE	California	Huntington Beach		
Muskegon Community College Herbarium		600	MUSK	Michigan	Muskegon		
Houghton Lake Wildlife Research Station Herbarium		500	HL	Michigan	Houghton Lake Heights		
Long Island University Herbarium		500	SOUT	New York	Southampton		
Simpson College Herbarium		500	SICH	Iowa	Indianola		
Mohr Herbarium	Alabama Museum of Natural History	0	ALU	Alabama	Tuscaloosa		
Amherst College Herbarium		0	AC	Massachusetts	Amherst		
Arnold Arboretum Herbarium	Harvard University	0	AAH	Massachusetts	Jamaica Plain		
Arnold Arboretum Herbarium	Harvard University	0	A	Massachusetts	Cambridge		
Austin High School Herbarium		0	AHS	Texas	Austin		
Biology Department Herbarium	Texas A&M University	0	TAMU	Texas	College Station		
Dudley Herbarium	California Academy of Sciences	0	DS	California	San Francisco		
California Department of Fish and Wildlife Herbarium		0	TIC	California	Terminal Island		
Gilbert L. Stout Plant Disease Herbarium	California Department of Food and Agriculture	0	BPS	California	Sacramento		
Carnegie Institution of Washington Herbarium		0	CI	California	Stanford		
Catholic University of America Herbarium		0	LCU	District of Columbia	Washington		
Charterhouse School Museum Herbarium		0	GOD	California	Berkeley		
Citrus College Herbarium		0	AZUS	California	Glendora		
Colorado State Museum Herbarium		0	COLOM	Colorado	Denver		
Crispus Attucks High School Herbarium		0	CAHS	Indiana	Indianapolis		
Cusino Wildlife Research Station Herbarium		0	CUS	Michigan	Shingleton		
Douglass College Herbarium	Rutgers University	0	RUT	New Jersey	New Brunswick		
Duke University Moss Herbarium		0	ABSM	North Carolina	Durham		
East High School Herbarium		0	SLC	Utah	Salt Lake City		
Eastern Nevada Landscape Coalition		6,553	ENLC	Nevada	Ely		
Field Museum of Natural History		0	FMNH	Illinois	Chicago		
Forest Products Laboratory Herbarium		0	BFDL	Wisconsin	Madison		
Forest Service Herbarium	US Department of Agriculture	0	POFS	Oregon	Portland		
Economic Herbarium of Oakes Ames	Harvard University	0	ECON	Massachusetts	Cambridge		
Farlow Reference Library and Herbarium of Cryptogamic Botany	Harvard University	0	FH	Massachusetts	Cambridge		
Orchid Herbarium of Oakes Ames	Harvard University	0	AMES	Massachusetts	Cambridge		
Houston Museum of Natural Science Herbarium		0	HPM	Texas	Houston		
I.W. Carpenter Jr. Herbarium	Appalachian State University	0	BOON	North Carolina	Boone		
Kansas State University Herbarium		0	KSC	Kansas	Manhattan		
Lloyd Library and Museum Herbarium		0	LLO	Ohio	Cincinnati		
Marylhurst College Herbarium		0	MARO	Oregon	Marylhurst		
Michigan Technological University Herbarium		0	MCT	Michigan	Houghton		
Michigan Technological University Herbarium		0	MCTF	Michigan	L'Anse		
Natural History Museum of Los Angeles County Herbarium		0	LAM	California	Los Angeles		
New England Botanical Society Herbarium		0	NEBC	Massachusetts	Cambridge		
Oberlin College Herbarium		0	OC	Ohio	Oberlin		
Ochoco National Forest Herbarium		0	OCNF	Oregon	Prineville		
Otero Junior College Herbarium		0	LAJC	Colorado	La Junta		
Pacific Marine Station Herbarium		0	PMS	California	Dillon Beach		
Pacific Northwest Forest and Range Experiment Station Herbarium		0	LAGO	Oregon	La Grande		
Pfeiffer University Herbarium		0	PFC	North Carolina	Misenheimer		
Pomona College Herbarium		0	POM	California	Claremont		
Portland State University Herbarium		29,000	HPSU	Oregon	Portland		
Prairie View A&M University Herbarium		0	TPV	Texas	Prairie View		
Rappahannock Community College Herbarium		0	GLEN	Virginia	Glenns		
Rocky Mountain Forest and Range Experiment Station Forest Service Herbarium		0	USFS	Colorado	Fort Collins		
Rutgers Mycological Collection		40000	RUTPP	New Jersey	New Brunswick		
Saint Vincent College Herbarium		0	LAT	Pennsylvania	Latrobe		
Santa Barbara Museum of Natural History Herbarium		0	SBM	California	Santa Barbara		
Sonoma State University Herbarium		0	ROPA	California	Rohnert Park		
Southern Utah University		0	SUU	Utah	Cedar City		
