= KNK =

KNK may refer to:

- Kara no Kyōkai, a light novel series by Kinoko Nasu
- KNK (band), South Korea
- Northern Kentucky University Herbarium
- Kuranko language of Sierra Leone, ISO 639 code
- ISO 3166-2 code KN-K, for St. Kitts
- Konferenz Nationaler Kultureinrichtungen, Conference of National Cultural Institutions, East Germany
- German KNK series of breeder reactors
- National Convergence "Kwa Na Kwa", Central African Republic political party
- Il-Kunsill Nazzjonali tal-Ktieb, the Maltese-language name of Malta's National Book Council
- Kurdistan National Congress
