= Sid J. Hare =

American landscape architect (1860–1938)

- Born: Sidney John Hare; January 26, 1860; Louisville, Kentucky, U.S.
- Died: October 25, 1938 (aged 78); Kansas City, Missouri, U.S.
- Resting place: Forest Hill Calvary Cemetery; Kansas City, Missouri, U.S.
- Education: Central High School
- Occupation: Landscape architect
- Employer: Hare & Hare
- Spouse: Mathilda A. Korfhage (m. 1885)
- Children: 2, including S. Herbert Hare

Sidney John Hare (January 26, 1860 - October 25, 1938) was an American landscape architect. He worked with his son S. Herbert Hare with the landscaping company Hare & Hare.

== Early life ==
Sidney John Hare was born on January 26, 1860, in Louisville, Kentucky, to Isadore (née Bethurum) and Christopher Columbus Hare. He attended a private school in Louisville. Hare and his family moved to Kansas City, Missouri when he was eight. He graduated from the Central High School. In 1881, Hare finished a special course of study on surveying and trigonometry and received a special diploma from the Board of Education. He learned landscape architecture from George Kessler.

== Career ==
In 1881, Hare was hired by the City Engineer's Office. In 1896, Hare was the superintendent of Forest Hill Calvary Cemetery in Kansas City. He worked in this role for six years, leaving in 1902. In 1909, he opened a landscape architect office. In 1910, his son, S. Herbert Hare, joined his office. They named their business Hare & Hare. Hare was hired by J. C. Nichols to design Mission Hills, Kansas, including the Mission Hills Country Club, in 1913–1914. He was also hired by Robert A. Long to design Longview, Washington.

Hare designed Point Defiance Park in Tacoma, Washington and Dealey Plaza in Dallas, Texas. He also designed locations in Houston, Texas. With his son S. Herbert Hare, he designed the Nelson-Atkins Museum of Art in Kansas City and the Fort Worth Botanic Garden in Fort Worth, Texas.

== Death ==
In 1885, Hare married Mathilda A. Korfhage. They had one son and daughter, Sidney Herbert and Nellie.

In 1924, Hare moved into a 20-acre home east of Swope Park. He named it Harecliff. Hare died on October 25, 1938, at his Harecliff home in Kansas City, Missouri. He was buried at Forest Hill Calvary Cemetery in Kansas City.
