= James Parks =

James or Jim Parks may refer to:

- James Parks (freed slave) (1843–1929), freed slave prominently buried in Arlington National Cemetery
- James Parks (actor), American actor
- James C. Parks (1942–2002), American botanist and plant taxonomist
- Jim Parks (cricketer, born 1931) (1931–2022), the son, a batsman who became a wicket keeper
- Jim Parks (cricketer, born 1903) (1903–1980), the father, an all-rounder

== See also ==
- James Park (disambiguation)
- James Parkes (disambiguation)
- James Parke (disambiguation)
