= S. Herbert Hare =

American architect (1888–1960)

- Born: Sidney Herbert Hare; June 27, 1888; Kansas City, Missouri, U.S.
- Died: April 18, 1960 (aged 71); Kansas City, Missouri, U.S.
- Occupation: Architect
- Spouse: Aurel May Murtey (m. 1914)
- Relatives: Sid J. Hare (father)
- Practice: Hare & Hare
- Projects: Fort Worth Botanic Garden; Hermann Park

Sidney Herbert Hare (June 27, 1888 – April 18, 1960), better known as S. Herbert Hare, was an American landscape architect and urban planner. Hare was the seventeenth president of the American Society of Landscape Architects.

== Early life ==
Sidney Herbert Hare was born on June 27, 1888, in Kansas City, Missouri, to Mathilda Amelia (née Korfhage) and Sid J. Hare, a landscape architect. Hare attended Manual High School in Kansas City and then Harvard University for landscape architecture from 1908 to 1910, where he studied under the noted Frederick Law Olmsted Jr., but never completed the degree.

== Career ==
In 1906, Hare worked with his father briefly before attending college. In 1910, Hare and his father began their architecture firm, Hare & Hare. After his father's death in 1938, Hare continued to run the business.

During World War I, Hare was an urban planner for the U.S. Army at Camp Funston and for the United States Housing Corporation.

In 1913, Hare registered as a member of the American Society of Landscape Architects, and became a fellow in 1919. From 1941 to 1945, Hare served as the society's president. He also served as director of the American Institute of Planners and vice president of the American Planning and Civic Association.

== Personal life ==
Hare died on April 18, 1960, at his home in Kansas City.
