= Monongahela Cemetery =

- U.S. National Register of Historic Places
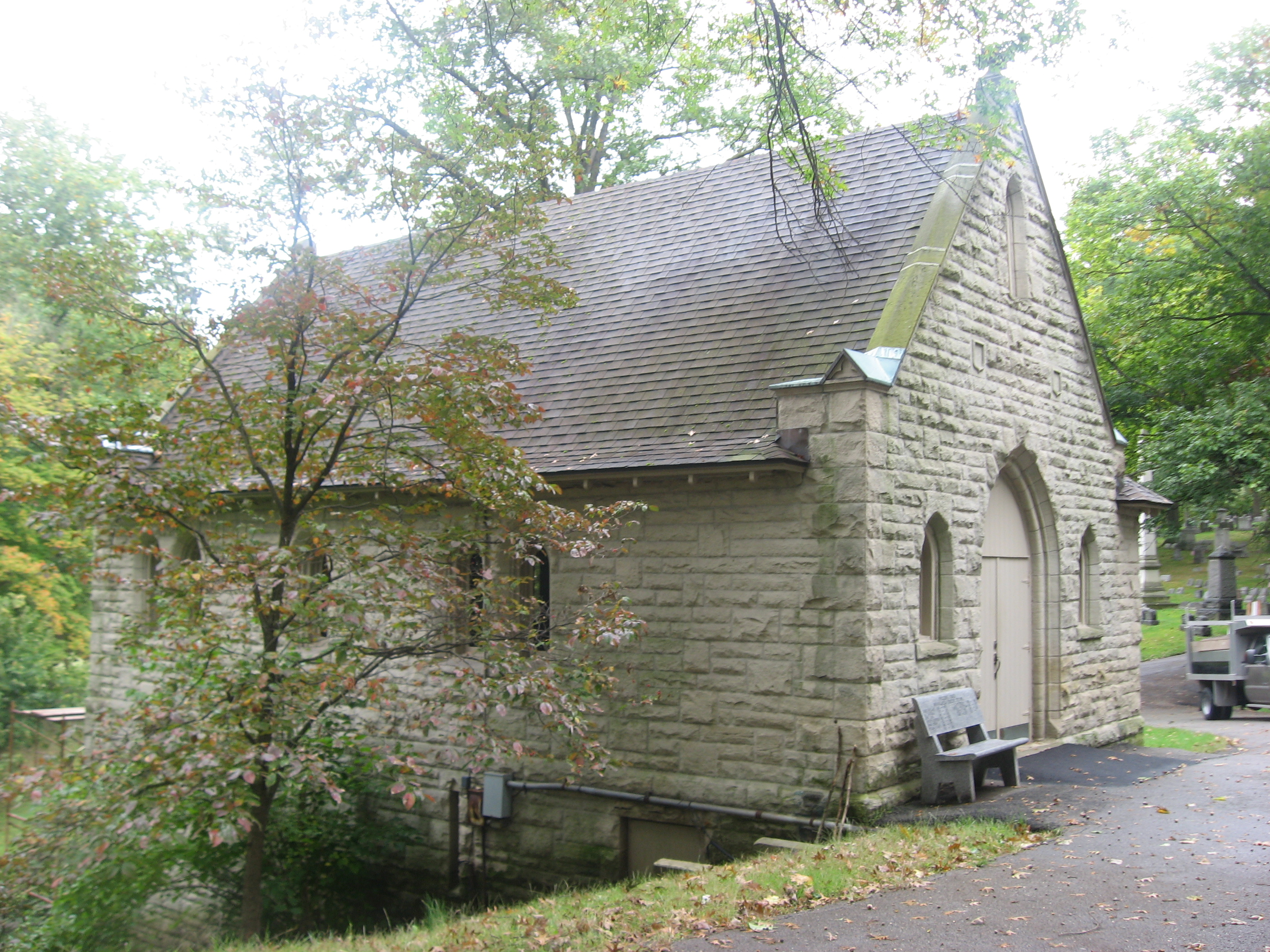
- The cemetery chapel

- Location within Pennsylvania Location within the United States
- Location: Cemetery Hill Rd. at Gregg St., Monongahela, Pennsylvania
- Coordinates: 40°11′39″N 79°55′20″W
- Built: 1863
- Architect: John Chislett; Hare and Hare, et al.
- Architectural style: Gothic Revival
- NRHP reference No.: 01001116
- Added to NRHP: October 14, 2001

The Monongahela Cemetery is an historic rural cemetery in Monongahela, Pennsylvania that was established in 1863. Landscape architects Hare & Hare designed a portion of the property.

== History and notable features ==
The cemetery was listed on the U.S. National Register of Historic Places in 2001.

The cemetery now occupies 160 acres, but only about 100 acres are included in the National Register listing. John Chislett designed the original thirty-two-acre plot in the rural cemetery tradition. Roughly sixty acres were added to the grounds in 1915 and were designed in the lawn park style by Hare & Hare. The five-acre St. Mary's Cemetery was opened circa 1900 and was incorporated into the 1915 expansion.

== Notable interments ==
- Robert Grant Furlong (1886–1973), US Congressman
- Baptiste "Bap" Manzini (1920–2008), professional football player
- Armand Niccolai (1911–1988), professional football player

The cemetery contains two Commonwealth war graves of World War II, a flight engineer of Royal Air Force Ferry Command and a sapper of the Royal Canadian Engineers.
