= Lucius P. Buchanan House =

Historic house in Missouri, United States

- U.S. National Register of Historic Places
- Location within Missouri Location within the United States
- Location: 3708 E. University Pkwy., Joplin, Missouri
- Coordinates: 37°05′47″N 94°27′51″W
- Area: 1.2 acres (0.49 ha)
- Built: 1926, 1965-1967
- Architect: Buchanan, Lucius P.; Hare & Hare
- Architectural style: Spanish Revival
- MPS: Historic Resources of Joplin, Missouri MPDF
- NRHP reference No.: 16000546
- Added to NRHP: August 22, 2016

Lucius P. Buchanan House, also known as the Ralph L. Gray Alumni Center of Missouri Southern State University, is a historic home located at Joplin, Jasper County, Missouri. It was built in 1926, and is a two-story, Spanish Revival style masonry dwelling covered in protective stucco. It has a low-pitched tiled gable roof and features multiple arched entryways and window frames, recessed porch, decorative ornamentation, and wrought iron embellishments. The prominent landscape architects Hare & Hare laid out the gardens, swimming pool and extended grounds.

In 2011, the alumni center opened and it was listed on the National Register of Historic Places in 2012.
