= James Parkes =

James Parkes may refer to:

- James Parkes (priest) (1896–1981), clergyman from Guernsey and scholar of Jewish–Christian relations
- James Parkes (rugby union) (born 1980), English rugby player
- Jim Parkes (rugby league), New Zealand rugby player; see List of New Zealand national rugby league team players
- James C.E. Parkes (1861–1899), first colonial Secretary for Native Affairs in Sierra Leone
- James S. Parkes, American Republican Party politician

== See also ==
- James Parks (disambiguation)
- James Parke (disambiguation)
- James Park (disambiguation)
