= Fort Worth Japanese Garden =

Garden in Fort Worth, Texas, US

Coordinates: 32.7351°N 97.3656°W

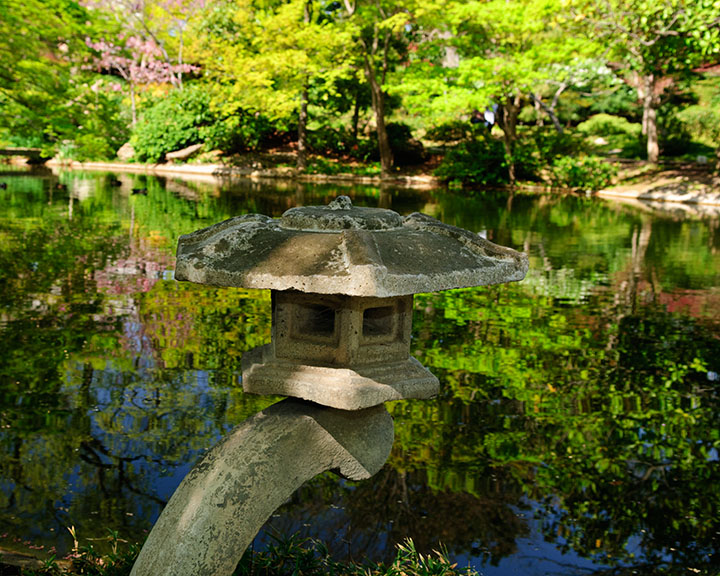
Japanese Lantern in the Japanese Garden.

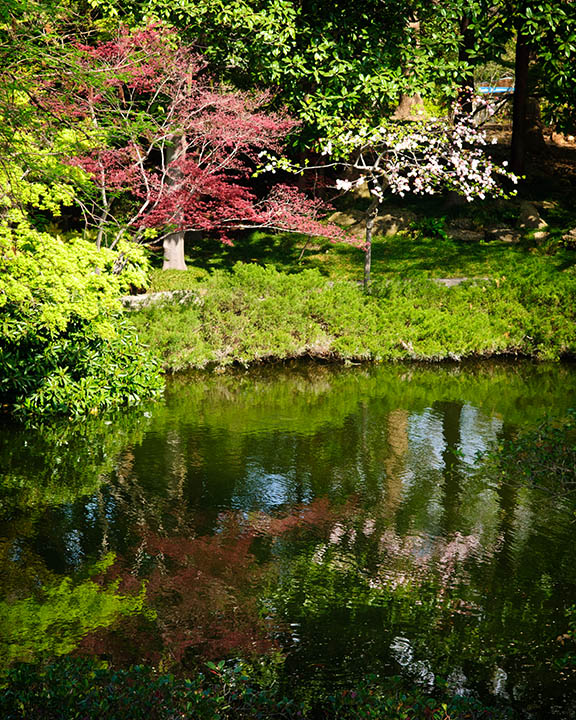
Reflections of the Spring vegetation in the Japanese Gardens.

The Fort Worth Japanese Garden is a 7.5-acre (3.0 ha) Japanese Garden in the Fort Worth Botanic Garden. The garden is built on the site of a former gravel pit used as a dumping ground. In 1968, Kingsley K. Wu, a graduate of the University of Tokyo and a professor at Texas Women's University, was hired to finalize the design. Dedicated in 1973, the garden features many plants and construction materials donated by Fort Worth's sister city Nagaoka, Japan. The main gate was designed by Albert Komatsu and Associates (Komatsu, Inc.) and dedicated in 1976. The garden hosts two annual events, the Spring Festival and the Fall Festival, featuring demonstrations of Japanese art and culture.

== Garden elements ==
Attractions at the garden include a zen garden, a moon viewing (tsukimi) deck, waterfalls, cherry trees, Japanese maples, a pagoda, and fishfood dispensers to feed the hundreds of koi in the Japanese Garden's three ponds. Scott Brooks, the Fort Worth Japanese Garden's senior gardener, reports:

The Fort Worth Japanese Garden was originally constructed with materials donated from numerous individuals, businesses, and institutions in north Texas and elsewhere in the USA. In the 1990s, Fort Worth's Japanese sister city, Nagaoka, donated an authentic Mikoshi (a sacred palanquin) to Fort Worth, which is currently housed within the garden's precincts. Several trees, including pines and flowering cherries, were similarly donated. Finally, Mr. Shigeichi Suzuki, a landscape architect from Nagaoka, donated plans for a karesansui-style addition to the Garden in 1997. The addition was completed in 2000, and is now called the 'Suzuki Garden'.

The Fort Worth Japanese Garden was built into a little valley, originally a gullied bluff, that opened onto the floodplain of the Trinity River's Clear Fork branch. Enlarged as a gravel quarry, the site also served at various times as a watering hole for cattle, a trash dump, and a squatter's camp. Today, the secluded valley serves as a Japanese-style 'stroll garden' (kaiyushiki teien).

At the heart of the landscape is a system of ponds, surrounded by hills (tsukiyama), and enclosed by a network of interconnected paths, pavilions, bridges, and decks. As the name implies, the garden unfolds as an ever-changing series of landscape perspectives to visitors who stroll along those thoroughfares.

Built in the tradition of Edo-period (1600-1868) stroll gardens, the Fort Worth Japanese Garden integrates several Japanese styles of garden design into a single landscape. Examples of the 'Hill-and-Pond' (tsukiyama rinsentei), 'Dry Landscape' (karesansui), 'Tea Garden' (roji), and 'Enclosed-Garden' (tsubo niwa), types are all expressed there. In addition, the garden features architectural elements derived from venues historically associated with Japanese gardening. These include Buddhist temples, Imperial villas, the estates of Samurai lords, and the townhouse gardens of wealthy merchants.

Several unconventional architectural elements are exhibited in the Fort Worth Japanese garden. One of them, called the 'Pavilion', is derivative of a Shinto shrine's main hall. It stands above the ground on posts, and features several gabled roofs with criss-crossed extensions (chigi). Another unusual garden element is the 'Mikoshi', an ornate palanquin donated to Fort Worth by the citizens of Nagaoka, Japan. Likewise, a 'taijitu' (yin-yang symbol), a graceful Indochinese Buddha, and three stone monkeys (Mizaru, Kikazaru, and Iwazaru), are all atypical additions unique to this Fort Worth exhibit.

The 'Karesansui Garden' (formerly called the 'Meditation Garden'), is patterned after Kyoto's famous 'Garden of the Abbot's Quarters', at the Ryoanji temple complex. It is a classic fifteen-stone, 'Hira niwa' (Flat Garden) composition, that has its own unique characteristics. One of them is an elevated and enclosed viewing veranda, evocative of a Japanese-style roofed bridge (rokyo). It surrounds the flat garden, allowing it to be viewed from all sides. Another is the exclusion of plant material from the exhibit's core. The fifteen boulders are surrounded by patterned gravel (samon), enclosed within a stone retainer, and surrounded by black volcanic scoria. The only plants allowed to flourish within this composition are the fruticose lichens which have colonized the boulder's surfaces. This minimalist exhibit stands as an exuisite metaphor of the famously sparse Zen aesthetic.

The Fort Worth Japanese Garden's 'Moon-Viewing Deck' is a creative adaptation of the Ginkakuji temple's famous 'Kogetsudai' sand cone. Fort Worth's version is intended to be an interactive karesansui exhibit, in which visitors may ascend the flat-topped cone via steps, and view the composition from above. A 'Taijitu' (a yin-yang symbol), lies embossed in exposed-aggregate concrete at the summit. This highly unusual (but fun) addition to a Japanese garden is ultimately a cosmological symbol of Chinese origin. It also has other interpretations, including its most important contemporary association with Korean culture, and as a metaphor for oriental mysticism in American 'Pop' culture. The exhibit also features an amphitheatre that is countersunk into the same platform as the cone. Together, they serve as a performance venue for the garden's two annual festivals (matsuri), and as a moonlit chapel for weddings.

Two karesansui (dry landscape) exhibits at the Fort Worth Japanese Garden are evocative of rivers that originate in mountainous terrain. One of them begins adjacent the garden's 'Pavilion', and 'flows' down a winding, boulder-lined channel, to a small lake or sea. Here, the 'water' consists entirely of ornamental gravel, and can be viewed from several levels along its length. The other exhibit is near the garden's 'Moon-Viewing' deck. Like the first, it begins in a group of boulders that are intended to suggest a craggy range of mountains. This 'river' of mixed cobbles then descends along a terraced, boulder-lined channel, that is, in turn, surrounded by a berm of fine-textured turf. It disappears in the midst of several large boulders, like a river descending into a canyon. This creative departure from karesansui tradition was intended to suggest a purely American landmark. It is a garden metaphor of the Colorado River, which rises in the Rocky Mountains, flows across an elevated plateau, and descends into the depths of the Grand Canyon.
