= James Parke =

James Parke is the name of:

- James Cecil Parke (1881–1946), tennis player, Australian Open winner 1912
- James Parke, 1st Baron Wensleydale (1782–1868), English judge

== See also ==
- James Park (disambiguation)
- James Parkes (disambiguation)
- James Parks (disambiguation)
