= Hare & Hare =

American landscape architecture firm

Practice information
- Firm type: Landscape architecture
- Founders: Sid J. Hare; S. Herbert Hare
- Founded: 1910
- Location: Kansas City, Missouri, United States

Significant works and honors
- Projects: Fort Worth Botanic Garden

Hare & Hare was a landscape architecture firm founded in Kansas City, Missouri, in 1910 by the father-and-son team of Sid J. Hare and S. Herbert Hare. A number of their works are listed on the National Register of Historic Places.

== Notable works ==
- Charles S. Keith House (Kansas City, Missouri)
- Fort Worth Botanic Garden (Fort Worth, Texas)
- Horn-Vincent-Russell Estate (Mission Hills, Kansas)
- Lucius P. Buchanan House (Joplin, Missouri)
- Monongahela Cemetery (Monongahela City, Pennsylvania)
- Philbrook Museum of Art (Tulsa, Oklahoma)
- Robert Alexander Long High School (Longview, Washington)
