= James Park (VC) =

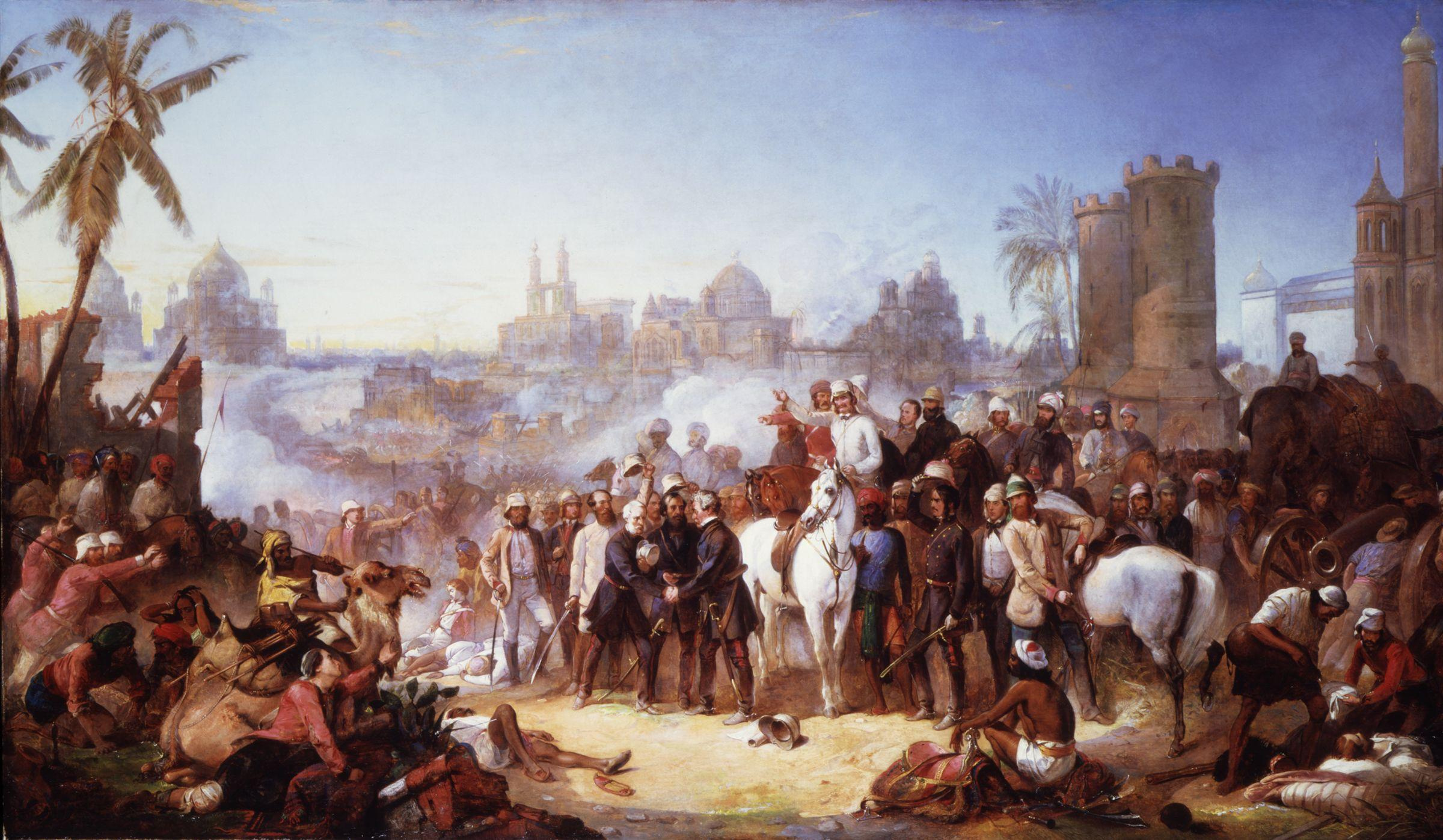
- Depiction of the Relief of Lucknow
- Born: 1835; Glasgow, Scotland
- Died: 14 June 1858 (aged 22-23); Lucknow, British India
- Military career
- Allegiance: United Kingdom
- Branch: Bengal Army
- Service years: † 1858
- Rank: Corporal
- Units: Bengal Artillery
- Conflicts: Indian Mutiny
- Awards: Victoria Cross

James Park VC (1835 – 14 June 1858) was a Scottish recipient of the Victoria Cross, the highest and most prestigious award for gallantry in the face of the enemy that can be awarded to British and Commonwealth forces.

== Details ==
Park was approximately 22 years old, and a gunner in the Bengal Artillery, Bengal Army during the Indian Mutiny when the following deeds took place at the Relief of Lucknow for which he was awarded the VC:

Elected respectively, under the 13th clause of the Royal Warrant of the 29th of January, 1856, by the Officers and non-commissioned officers generally, and by the private soldiers of each troop or battery, for conspicuous gallantry at the relief of Lucknow, from the 14th to the 22nd of November, 1857.

He was killed in action in Lucknow, British India on 14 June 1858.
