= Jim Park (footballer, born 1875) =

Australian rules footballer

Personal information
- Full name: Percy Tasman Park
- Born: 25 February 1875; Marrickville, New South Wales
- Died: 14 June 1919 (aged 44); Mildura
- Original team: Union Jack / Carlton (VFA)

Playing career^{1}
Years	Club	Games (Goals)
1897	Essendon	6 (0)
1899	St Kilda	9 (0)
Total		15 (0)
- ^{1} Playing statistics correct to the end of 1899.

Percy Tasman "Jim" Park (25 February 1875 – 14 June 1919) was an Australian rules footballer who played with Essendon and St Kilda in the Victorian Football League (VFL).

A solicitor by profession, he moved to Mildura at the turn of the century. He died from pneumonia in June 1919.
