= James C. Parks =

American botanist (1942–2002)

James Clair Parks, Ph.D. (1942–2002) was an American botanist and plant taxonomist who was a professor and herbarium curator at Millersville University in Millersville, Pennsylvania, USA from 1967 until his death in 2002. In 2004, the herbarium at Millersville University was dedicated in his honor as the James C. Parks Herbarium.

== Taxonomic specialties ==
Parks's taxonomic specialty was on American Compositae (Asteraceae) and American ferns. Dr. Parks conducted his doctoral dissertation on a taxonomic revision of the North American and Caribbean genus Melanthera Rohr (Compositae; Parks 1968).

== Some taxonomic names for which Parks is an author ==
1. Melanthera aspera var. glabriuscula (Kuntze) J.C.Parks

== Publications ==
Parks was the author of 14 journal articles and book chapters. These are listed below, from most to least recent.

1. Dyer AF, JC Parks, S Lindsay (2000) Historical review of the uncertain taxonomic status of Cystopteris dickieana R.Sim (Dickie's bladder fern). Edinburgh Journal of Botany 57 (1): 71–81.
2. Parks JC, AF Dyer, S Lindsay (2000) Allozyme, spore and frond variation in some Scottish populations of the ferns Cystopteris dickieana and Cystopteris fragilis. Edinburgh Journal of Botany 57 (1): 83–105.
3. Parks JC (2000). Lycopodiaceae. pp 64–70 in Rhoads AF, TA Block (eds.) The plants of Pennsylvania: an illustrated manual. University of Pennsylvania Press.
4. Parks JC, JD Montgomery (2000). Ferns. pp 71–106 in Rhoads AF, TA Block (eds.) The plants of Pennsylvania: an illustrated manual. University of Pennsylvania Press.
5. Parks JC, KA Mosser (1998) A morphological and allozymal study of a Cystoperis tennesseensis (Dryopteridaceae) population: first report of the species in Lancaster County, PA. Journal of the Pennsylvania Academy of Sciences 71 (2): 78–83.
6. Parks JC, CR Werth (1993) A study of spatial features of clones in a population of bracken fern, Pteridium aquilinum (Dennstaedtiaceae). American Journal of Botany 80 (5): 537–544.
7. Parks JC (1989) Distribution of gametophytic populations of Vittaria and Trichomanes in Pennsylvania. Rhodora 91: 201–206.
8. Parks JC, AF Rhoads (1985) Erigenia bulbosa in Lancaster County, Pennsylvania. Bartonia 51.
9. Stober SS, JC Parks (1985) Chromosomal studies of Physalis virginiana var. subglabrata and Physalis heterophylla. Bartonia 51: 65–68.
10. Parks JC, DR Farrar (1984) A first report of the fern genus Vittaria in New York. Rhodora 86 (848): 421–423.
11. Parks JC (1984) New Pennsylvania locality of Cryptogramma stelleri. Bartonia 50: 63.
12. Farrar DR, JC Parks, BW McAlpin (1983) The fern genera Vittaria and Trichomanes in the Northeastern United States. Rhodora 85 (841): 83–92.
13. Parks JC (1973) A revision of North American and Caribbean Melanthera (Compositae). Rhodora 75: 169–210.
14. Parks JC (1969) Simple technique for demonstrating chromosomal coils using Tradescantia pollen mother cells. Proceedings of the Pennsylvania Academy of Science 43: 61–63.

== Literature cited ==
Parks JC (1968) A revision of the genus Melanthera Rohr (Compositae): in North America and the Caribbean. Ph.D. Dissertation, Vanderbilt University.
