= James C. Parks Herbarium =

Coordinates: 39.99961°N 76.34949°W

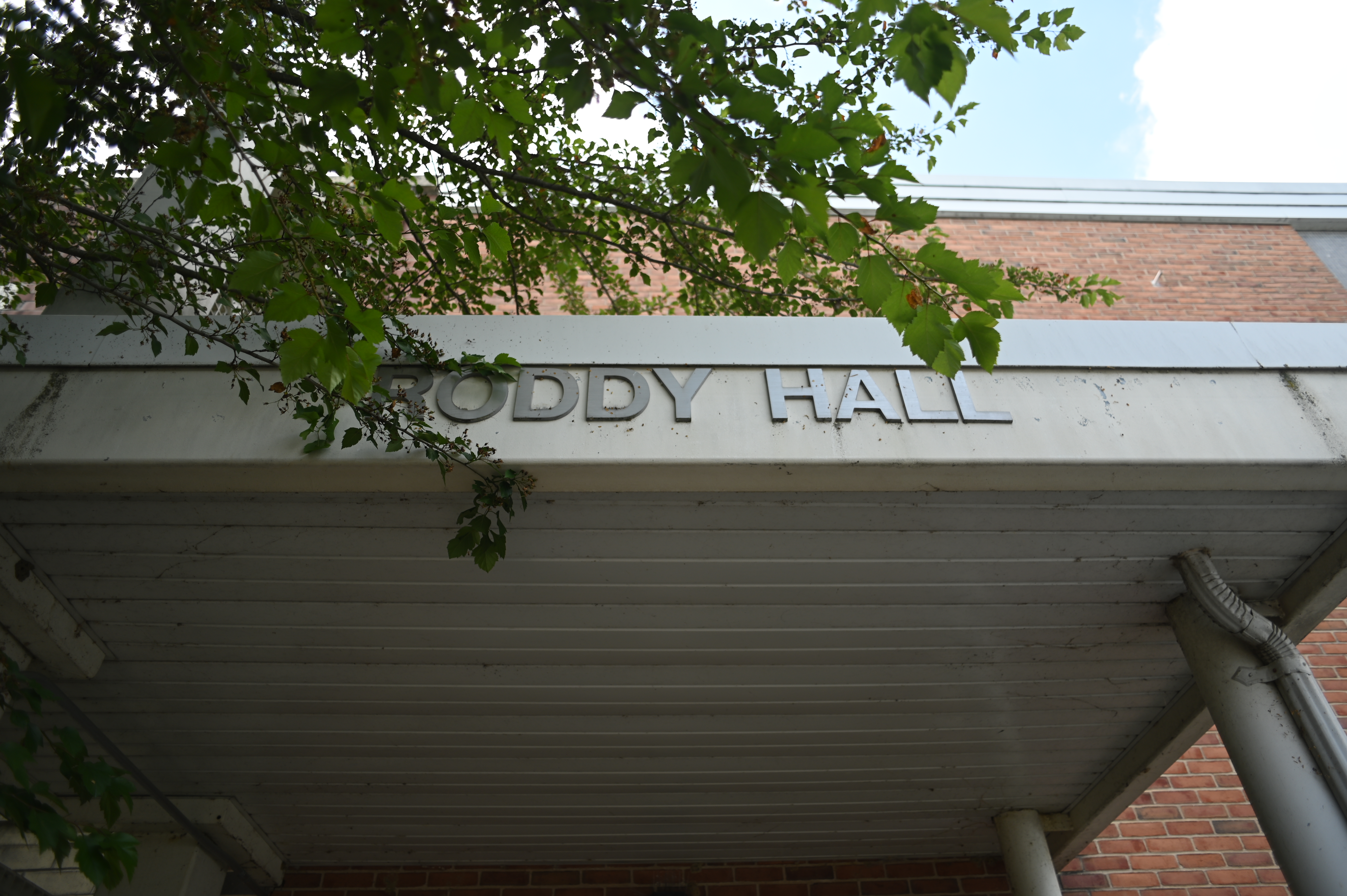
Roddy Hall at Millersville University where the herbarium is housed.

The James C. Parks Herbarium is the herbarium of Millersville University of Pennsylvania. It was formerly known simply as the Millersville University Herbarium until its dedication in 2004 in honor of its late curator, James C. Parks. The herbarium is registered globally at Index Herbariorum as MVSC; that being an abbreviation for "Millersville State College", as the university was known at the time that MVSC was chosen.

== Specimen holdings ==
The herbarium houses more than 23,000 specimens. The collection can be searched and records with images downloaded or mapped at the Herbarium's website. Most of these specimens are of vascular plants collected from the lower Susquehanna River valley. Specimens in the collection date back to the 1830s, with collection density increasingly substantially in the late 1850s to mid 1860s, which coincides roughly with the university's founding as Millersville State Normal School in 1855.

== Other products ==
The herbarium launched NatureAtlas in 2008 to serve as its specimen repository database, which was expanded shortly thereafter to be a generally accessible Web platform for mapping and exploring geospatially explicit observations and images of flora and fauna.

== Curators ==
The Herbarium's first official curator was James C. Parks, who served as such from 1967 until his death in 2002. Since 2005, Christopher R. Hardy has served as the herbarium's curator.
