= Fort Worth Botanic Garden =

Historic botanical garden in Fort Worth, Texas, United States

- U.S. National Register of Historic Places
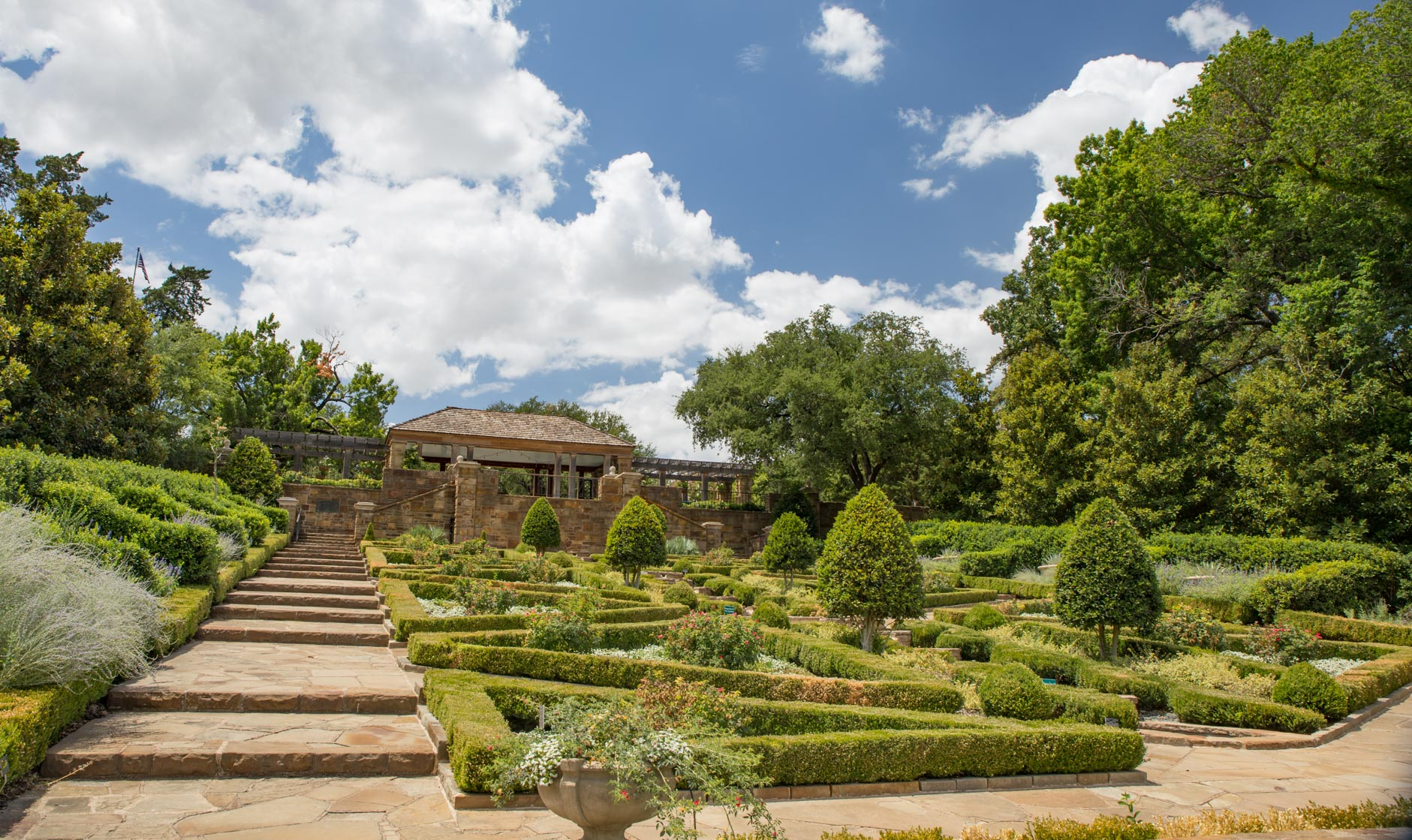
- Rose Ramp and Shelter House

- Location within Texas Location within the United States
- Location: 3220 Botanic Garden Blvd., Fort Worth, Texas
- Coordinates: 32°44′24″N 97°21′45″W
- Area: 120 acres (49 ha)
- Built: 1929; 97 years ago
- Architect: Hare & Hare et al.
- Architectural style: Renaissance
- Website: fwbg.org
- NRHP reference No.: 08001400
- Added to NRHP: January 29, 2009

The Fort Worth Botanic Garden is a botanical garden located in the cultural district of Fort Worth, Texas. Established in 1934, the garden is the oldest major botanic garden in Texas and was added to the National Register of Historic Places in 2009.

== History and organization ==
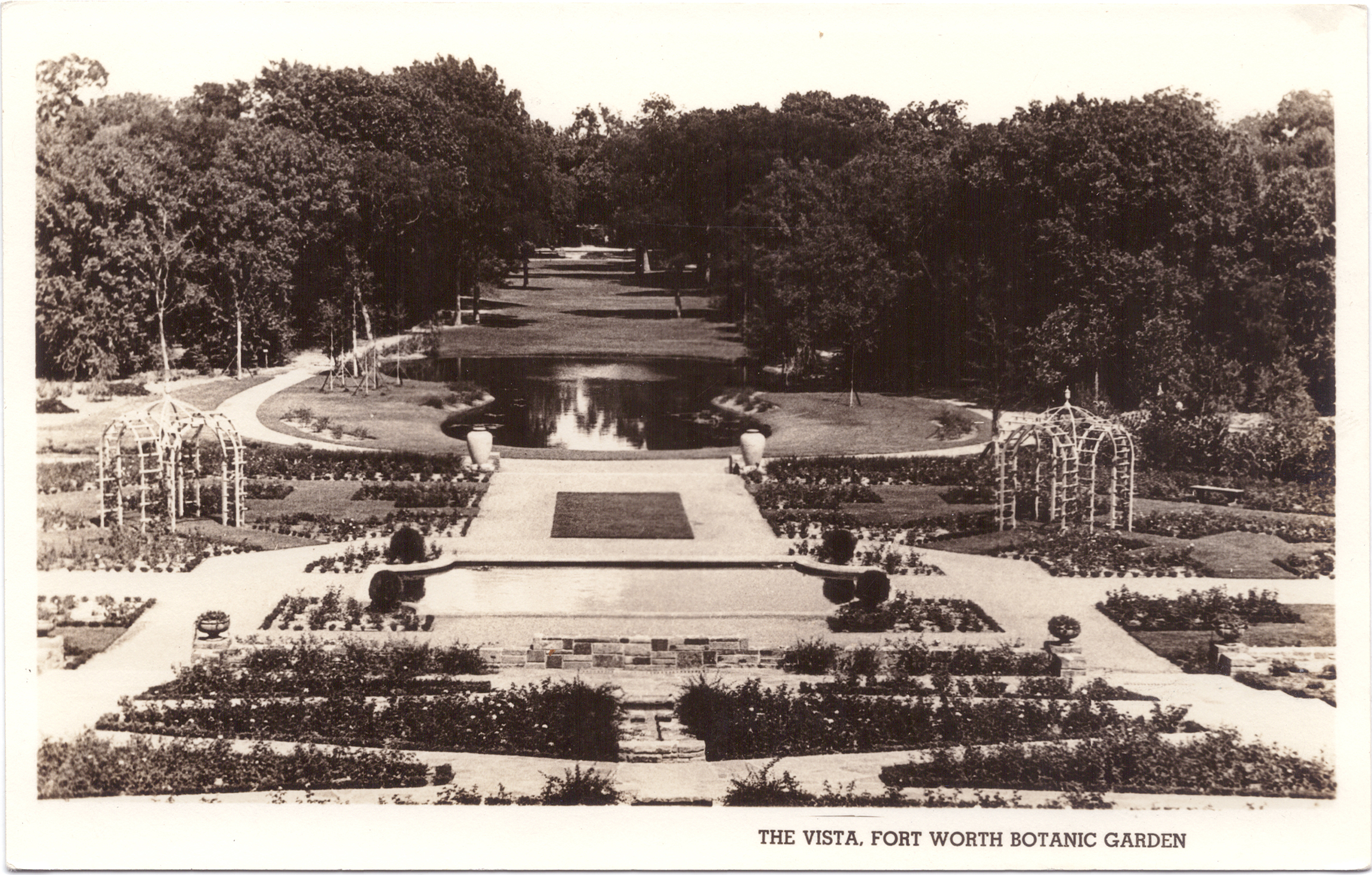
Postcard of the Vista at Fort Worth Botanic Garden, undated

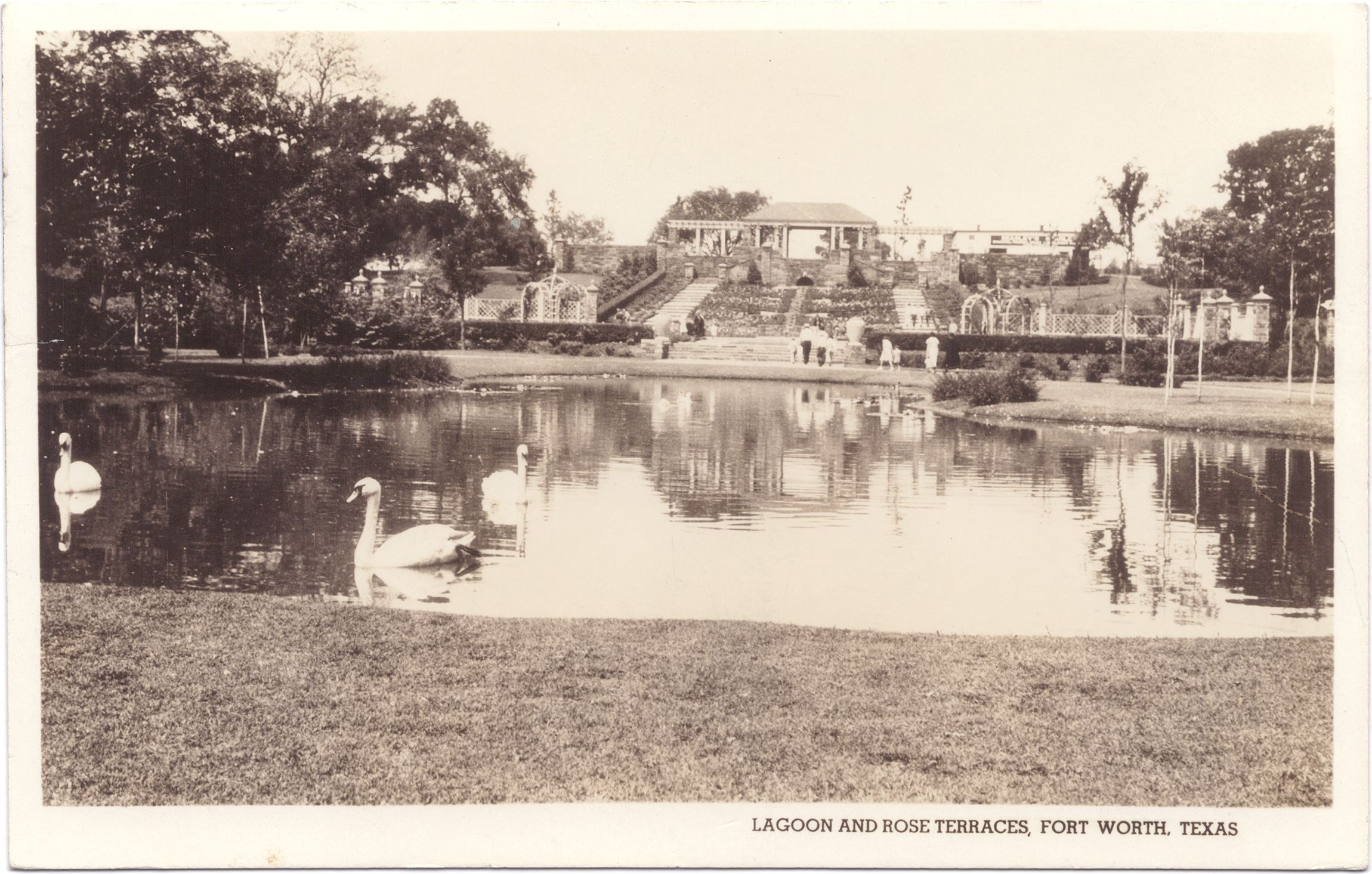
Postcard of the Lagoon and Rose Terraces at Fort Worth Botanic Garden, undated

The botanic garden started with development of the 37.5-acre Rock Springs Park in 1912 involving natural springs, streams and rock features. Completed in 1936, the Rock Spring Park was redeveloped in 2013 as the Tinsley Garden at Rock Springs, restoring the water features and re-planting with plants native to north Texas.

Workers employed by the Reconstruction Finance Corporation and the Civil Works Administration built the oldest areas of the garden including the Rose Garden, which was dedicated in 1933. Together, the Rock Springs Park and the Rose Garden became the Fort Worth Botanic Garden in 1934.

The landscape architecture firm Hare & Hare of Kansas City, Missouri designed these gardens, the horticulture building, now called the Rock Springs Building, and the Horseshoe Garden, which was developed in the 1950s. The Cactus Garden also was part of the original design. Created in 1935, it was replaced by the Perennial Garden in 1983.

Additional gardens have expanded the range of visitor experiences in nature, including the Fort Worth Japanese Garden, where a Japanese Festival is held in the spring and the fall. In 2011, the Botanical Research Institute of Texas (BRIT) opened its new center next door to the botanic garden in the city's cultural district. In 2020, BRIT took over management of the botanic garden, although the city retains ownership.

== Gallery ==
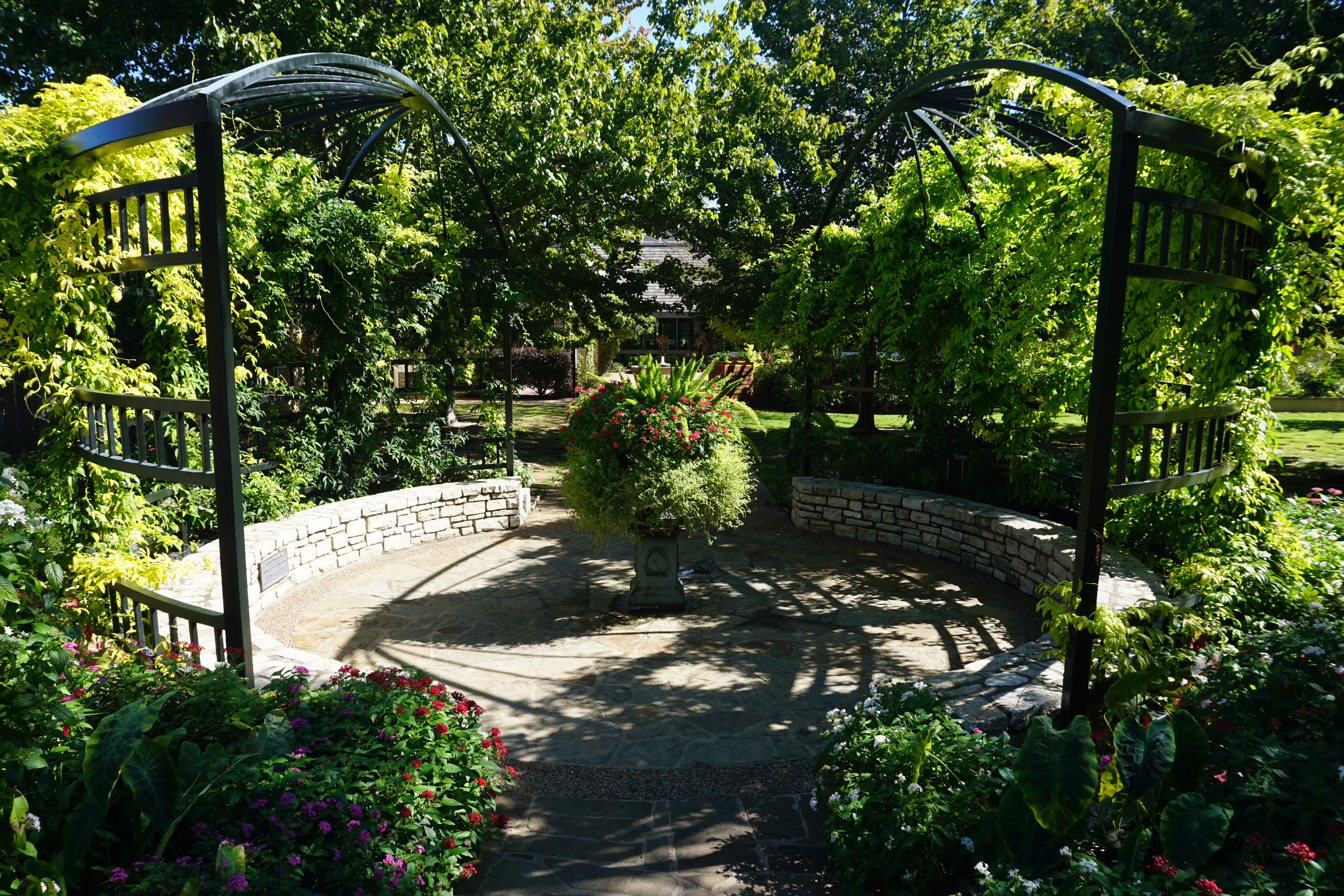
Arbor Day Grove

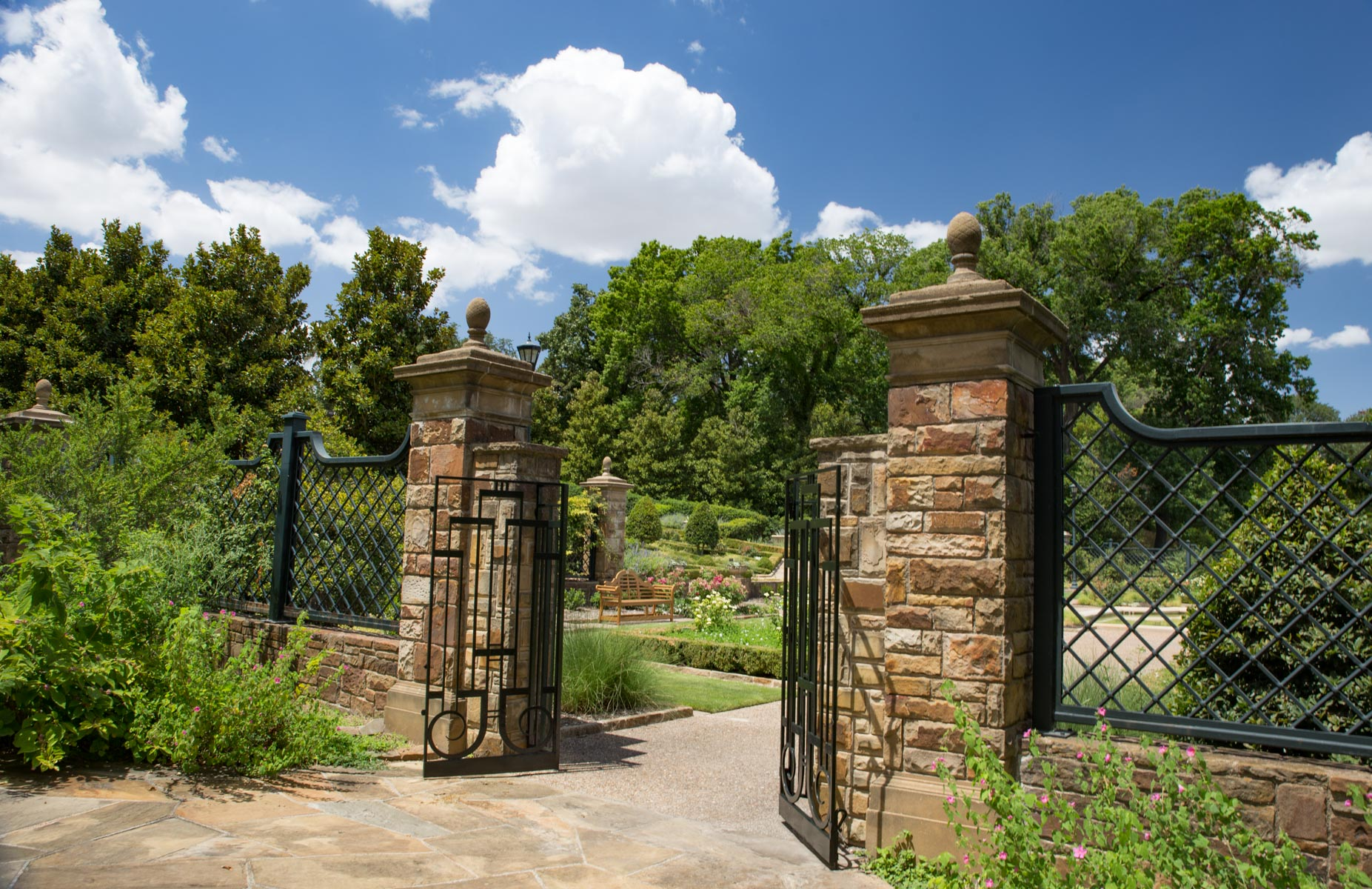
Gate at Rose Garden

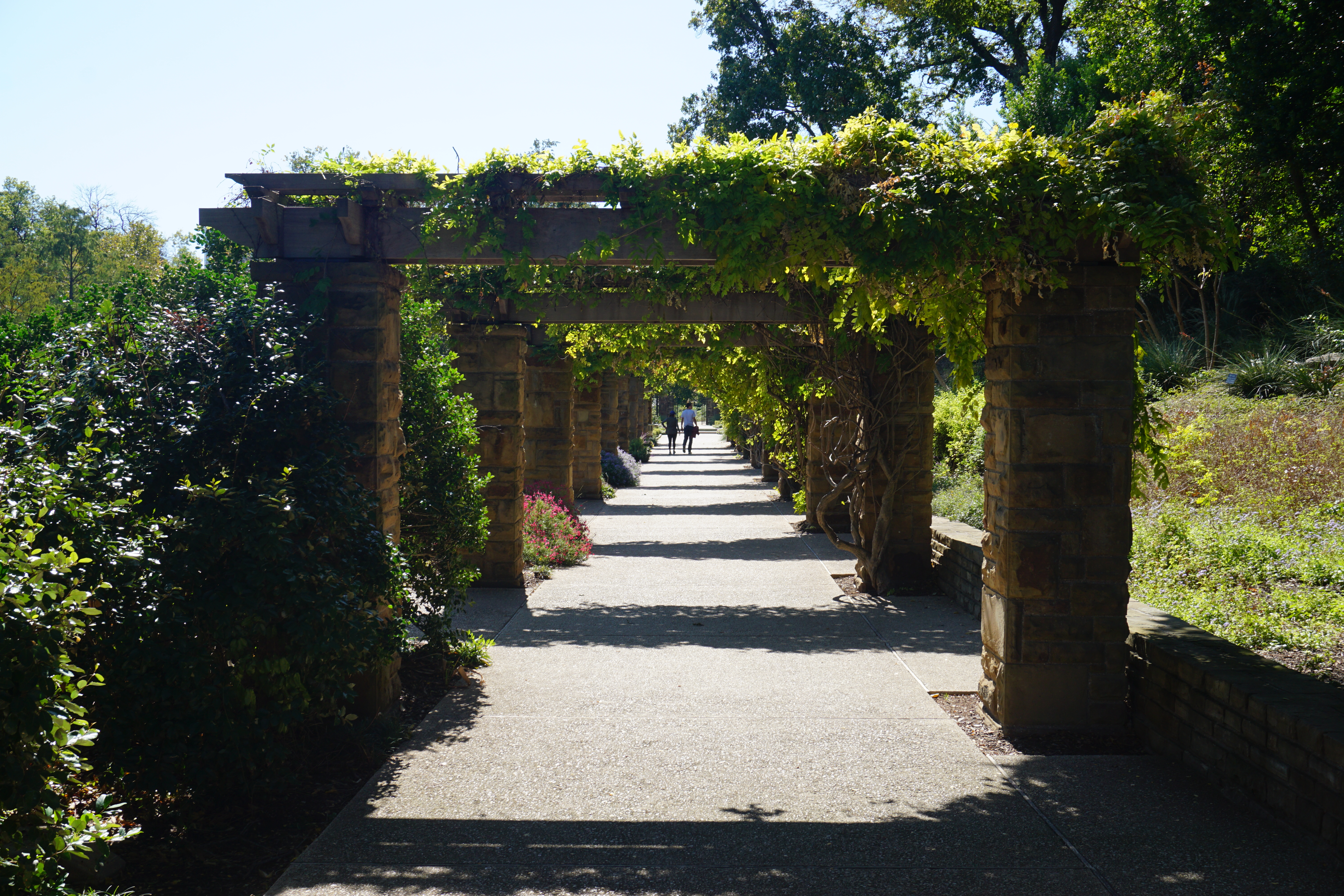
Republic of Texas Rose Garden

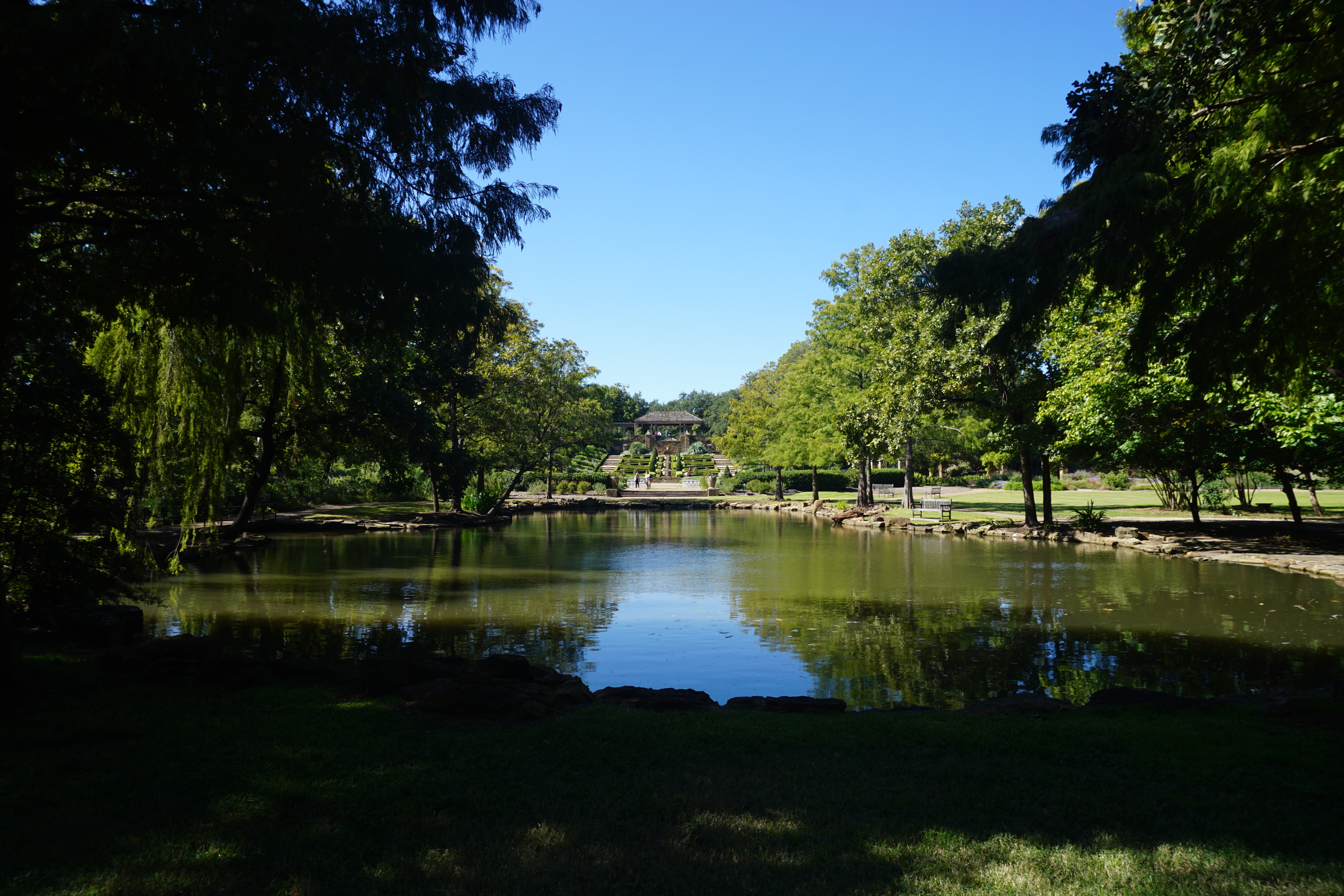
Pond and Rose Ramp

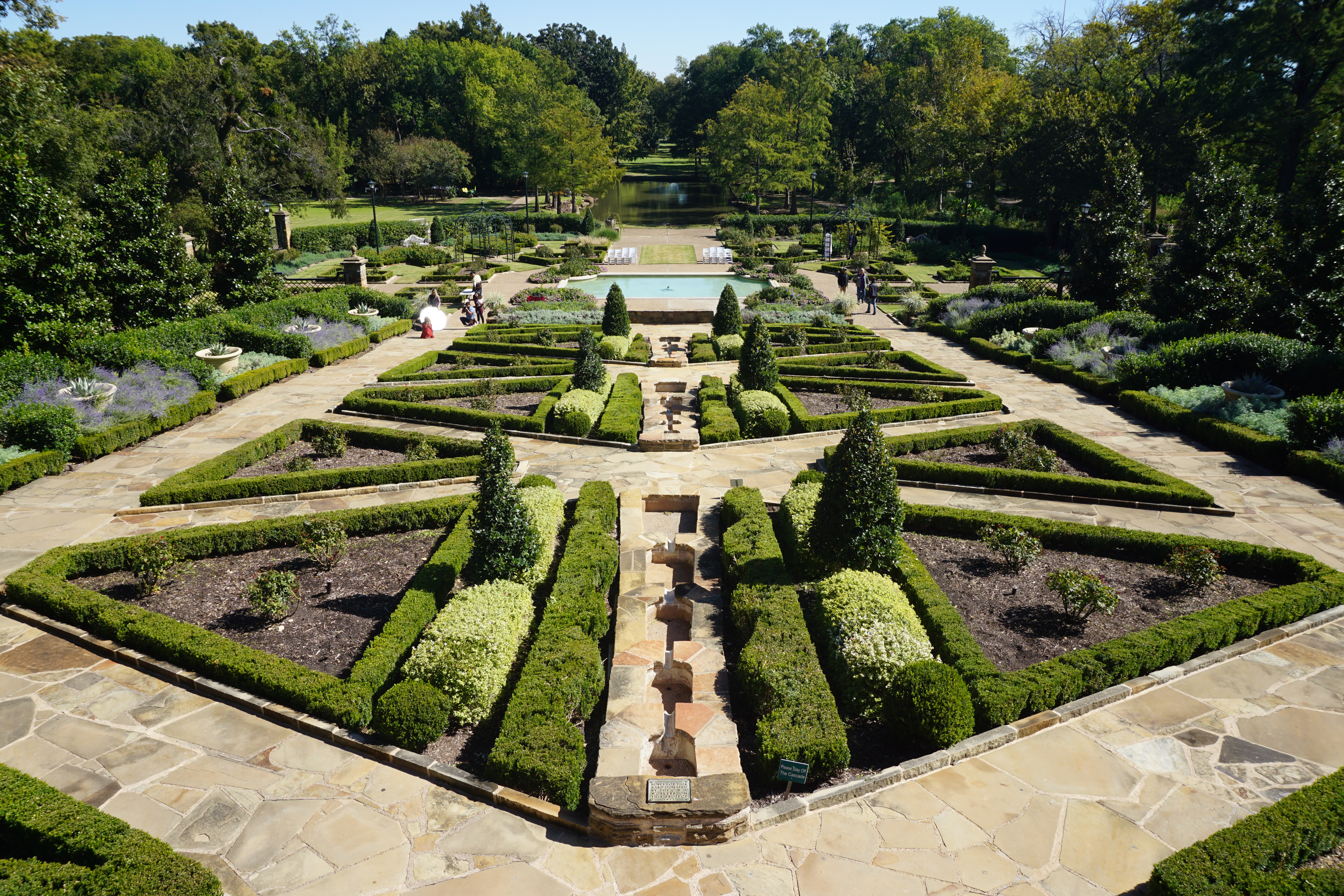
Rose Ramp and Lower Rose Garden

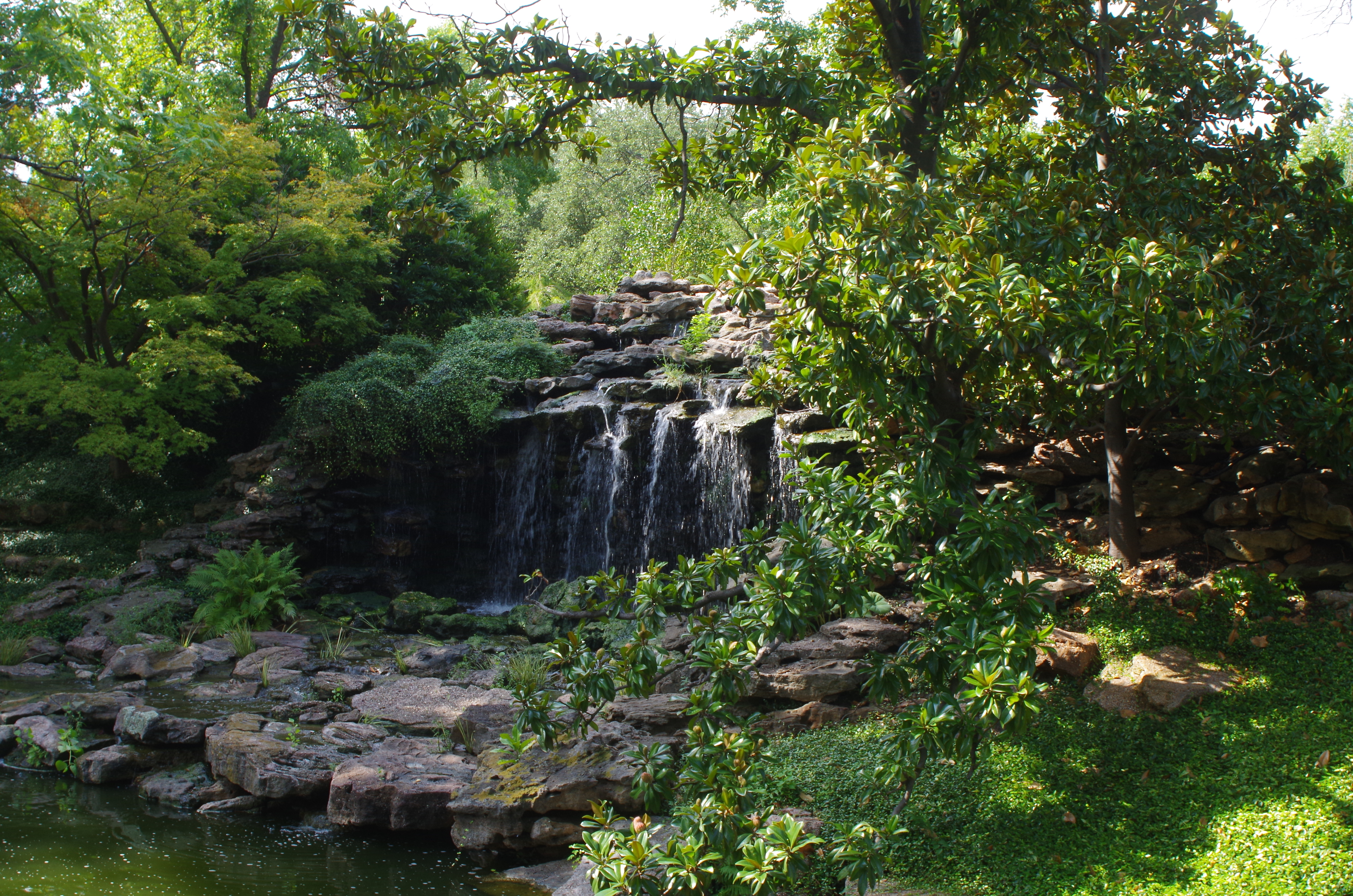
Waterfall in a garden area.

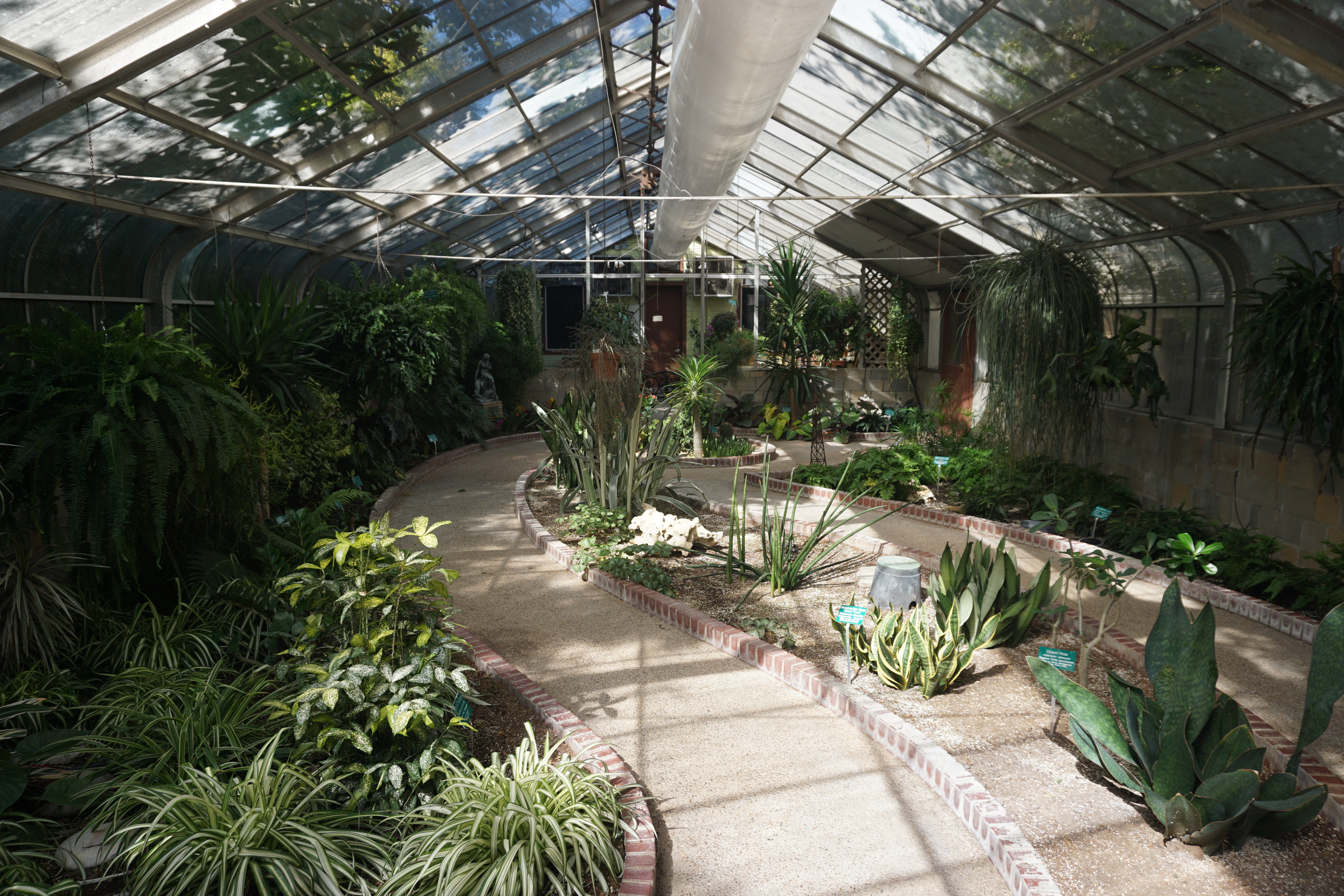
Exhibition Greenhouse

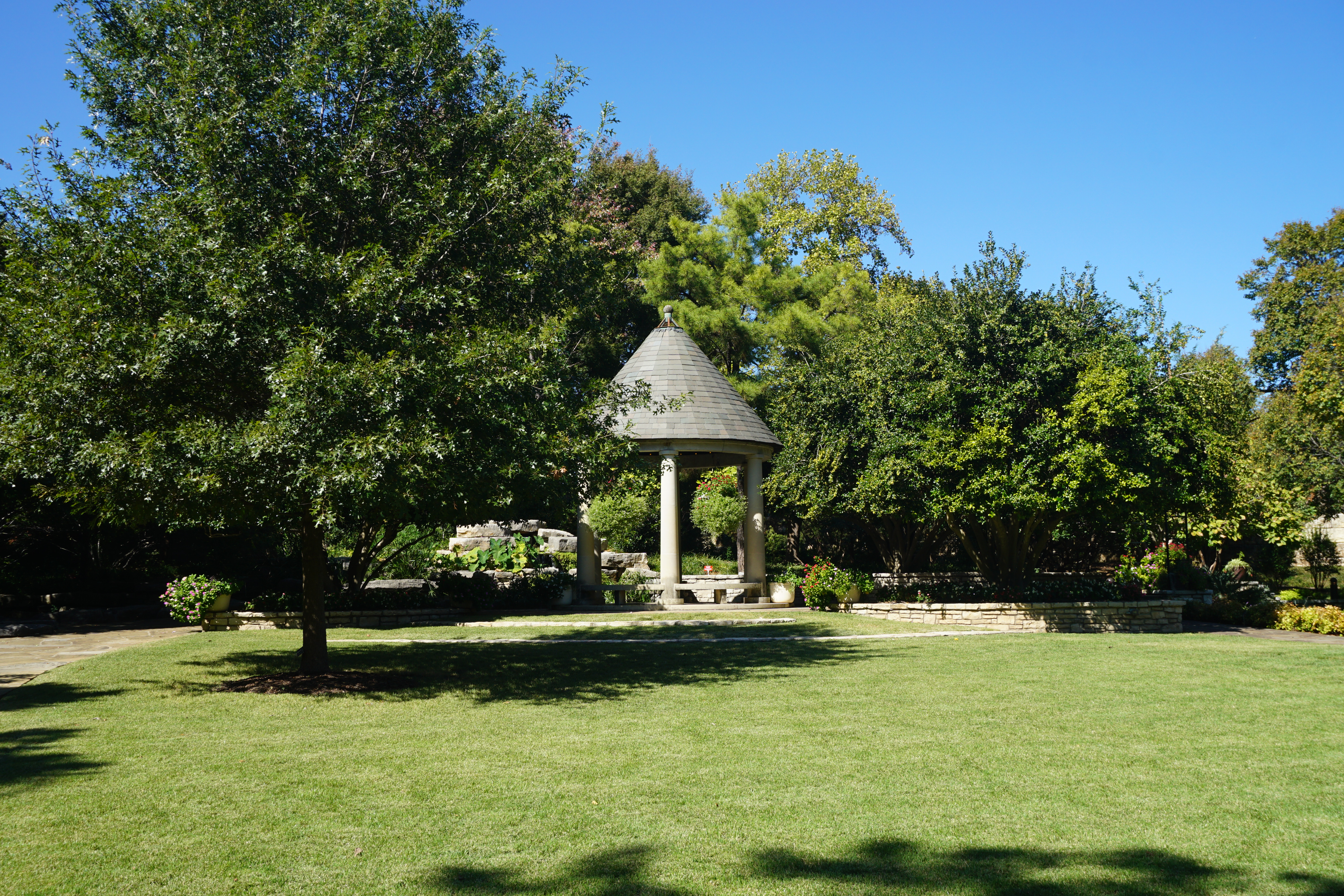
Adelaide Polk Fuller Garden

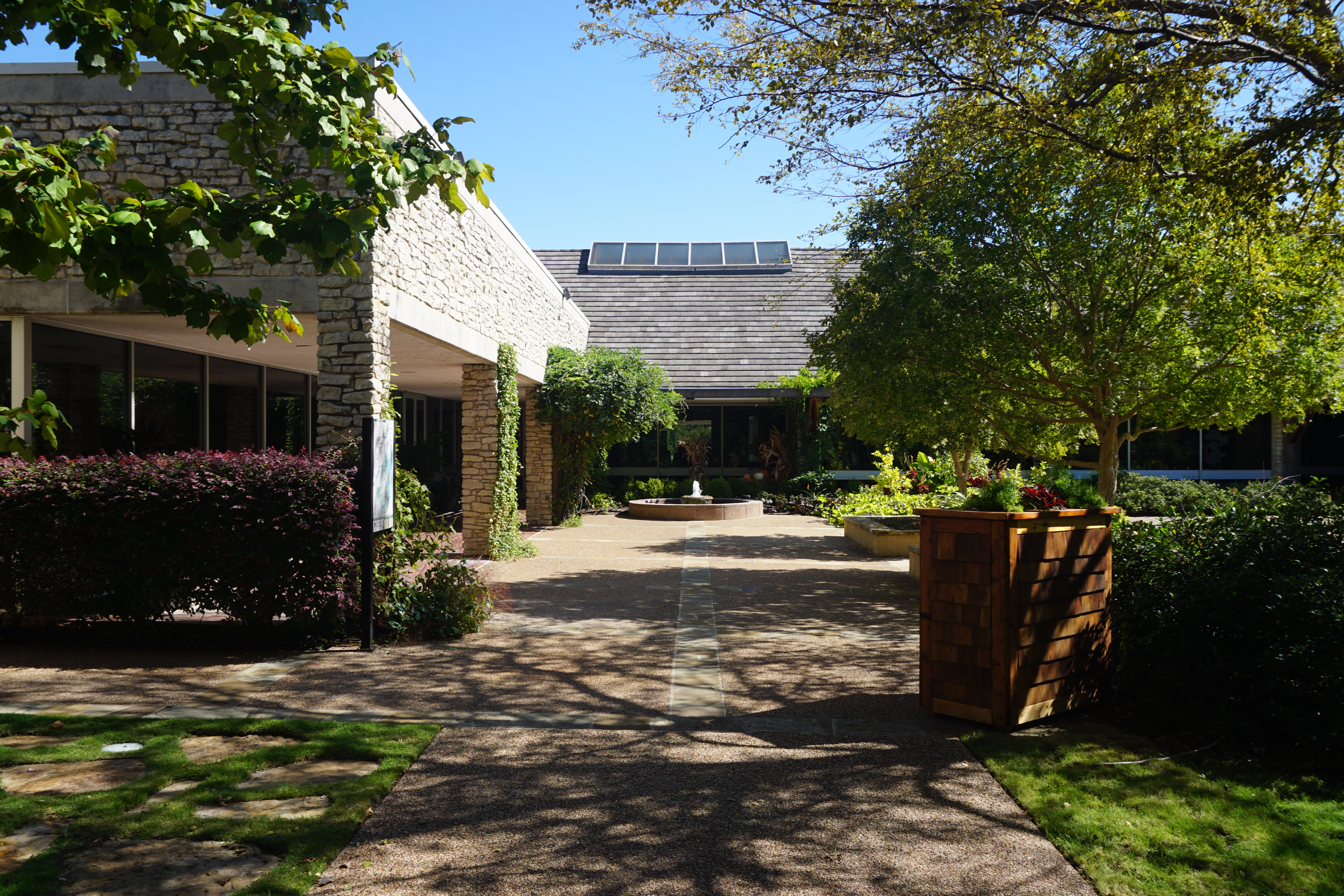
Deborah Beggs Moncrief Garden Center

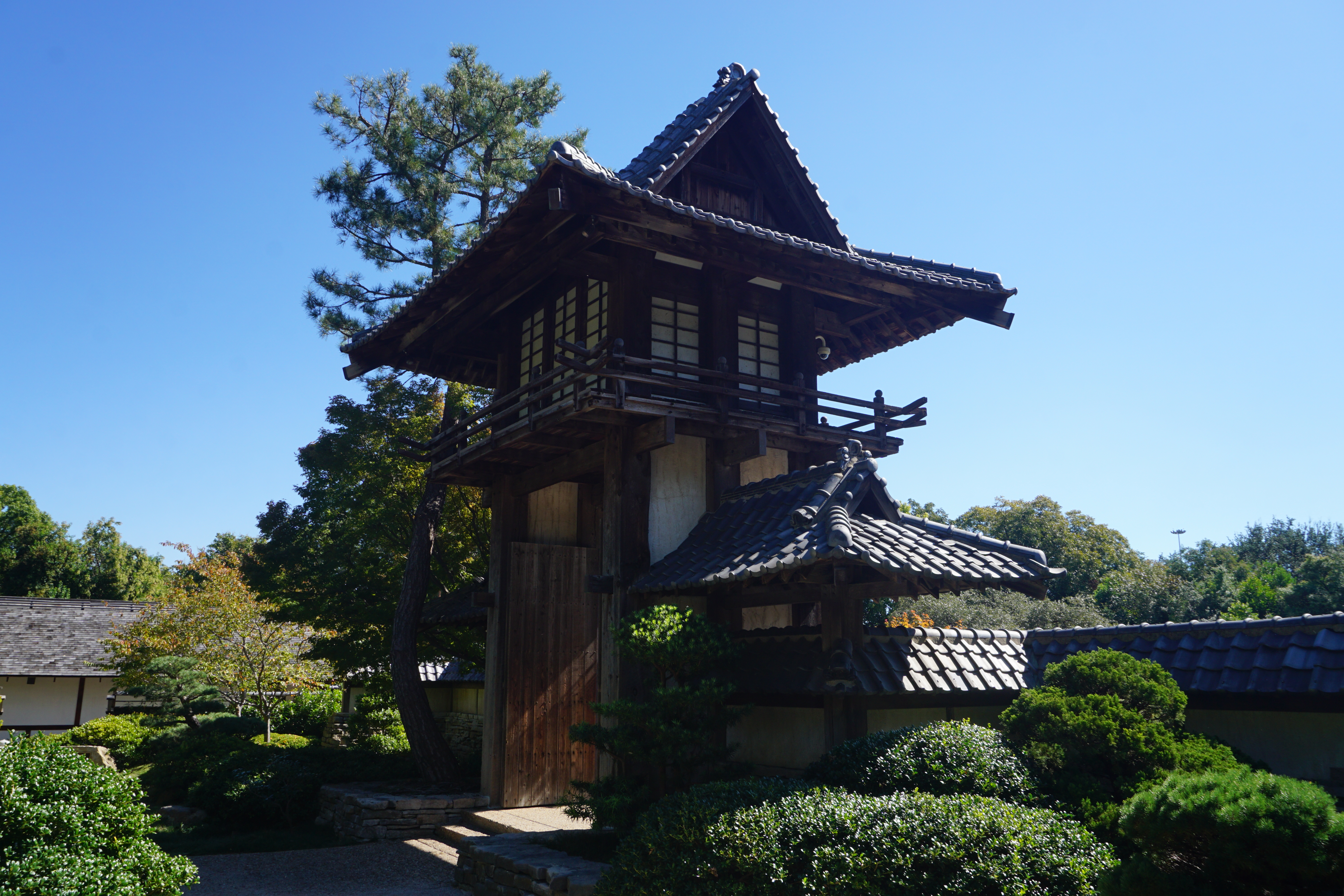
Japanese Garden (Main Entrance Gate)

== See also ==
- List of botanical gardens in the United States
- National Register of Historic Places listings in Tarrant County, Texas
