= La Giralda (disambiguation) =

La Giralda or Giralda may refer to:

- Alimentos La Giralda, a food company
- Giralda, the bell tower of the Cathedral of Seville, in Seville, Spain
- Giralda (1894), a British steam yacht that later served in the Spanish Navy as the royal yacht of Spain
- Giralda (Kansas City), a tower in Kansas City, Missouri, in the United States
- La Giralda, a building in Carmel-by-the-Sea, California, in the United States
- La Giralda (San Juan, Puerto Rico), a concrete house in San Juan, Puerto Rico, listed on the U.S. National Register of Historic Places
