= Saint Justa and Saint Rufina =

C. 1666 painting by Bartolomé Esteban Murillo

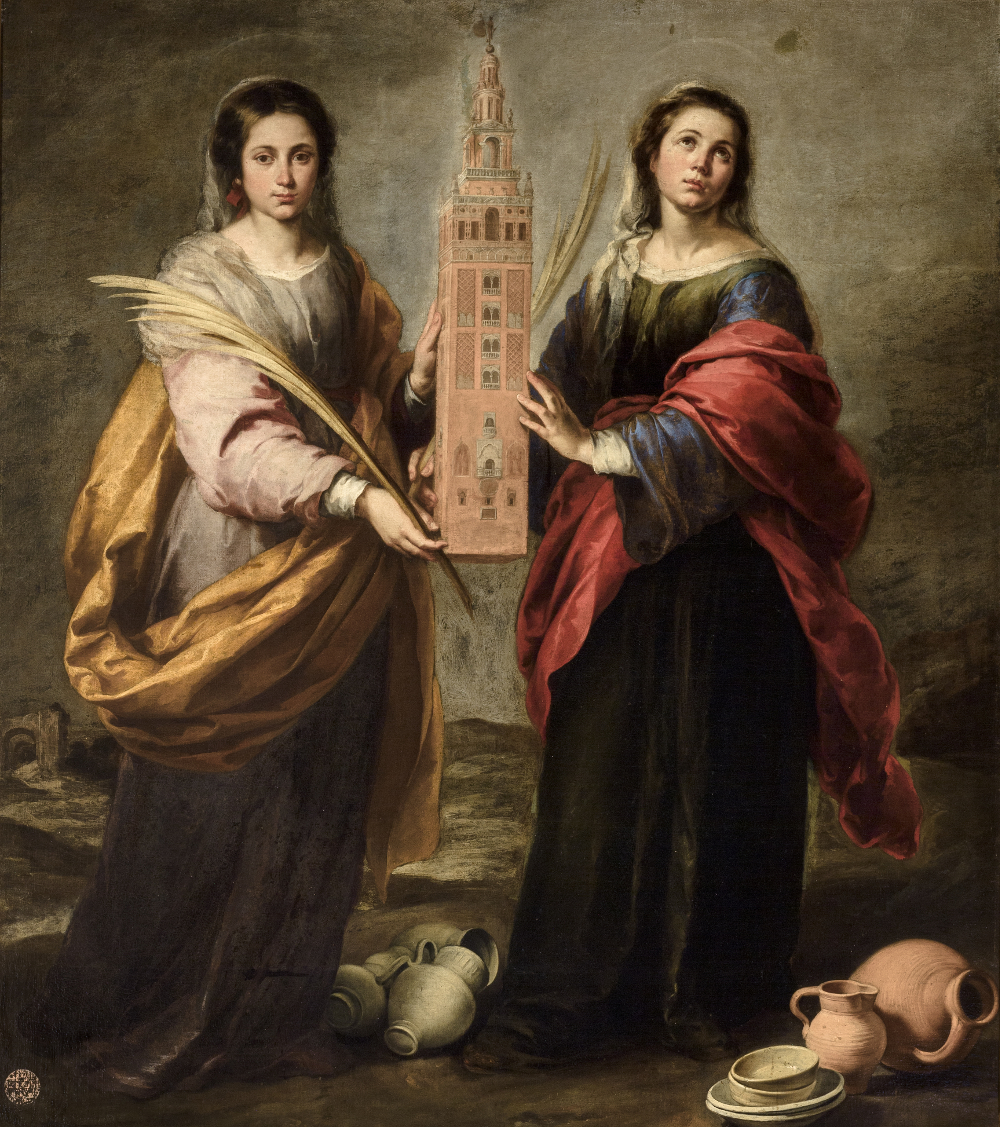
Saint Justa and Saint Rufina (c. 1666) by Bartolomé Esteban Murillo

Saint Justa and Saint Rufina is an oil on canvas painting by Bartolomé Esteban Murillo, created c. 1666, now held in the Museum of Fine Arts of Seville.

Saint Justa and Saint Rufina is one of the paintings made to decorate the church of the Capuchin Convent in Seville. The Seville Cathedral had suffered much damage during earthquakes over the centuries, and there was a popular belief at the time that intercession to the sister saints Justa and Rufina saved the Giralda, the cathedral's bell-tower, which was formerly a mosque minaret, during the 1504 earthquake. The sisters are depicted holding a model of the Giralda in the painting, and are the patron saints of the cathedral. Attributes such as the martyr's palm and clay pots lay on the ground, as they were daughters of a potter.

A copy of the work is in Pollok House in Glasgow, whilst another pair of works by the artist also showing these two saints previously in the Meadows Museum was proven in 2016 to have been stolen from a Jewish family in Paris by the Nazis.
