= Justa and Rufina =

Venerated as martyrs

Saints Justa and Rufina
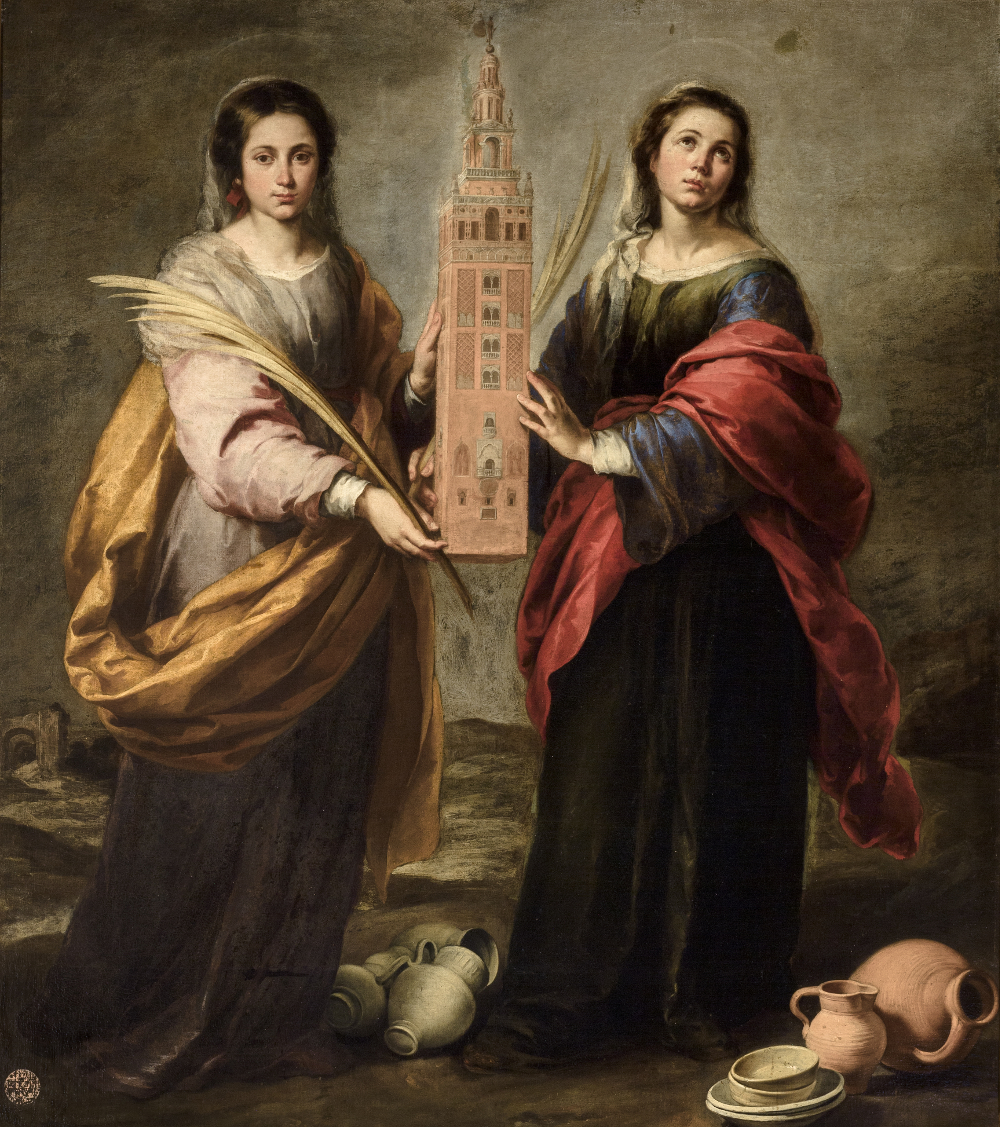
- Saints Justa and Rufina, by Murillo
- Born: Justa, 268 AD; Rufina 270 AD
- Died: 287 AD
- Venerated in: Catholic Church; Eastern Orthodox Church
- Major shrine: Seville
- Feast: 19 July (17 July in the medieval Hispanic liturgy)
- Attributes: A model of the Giralda; earthenware pots, bowls and platters; books on which are two lumps of potter's clay; palms of martyrdom; lion
- Patronage: Seville; potters; guilds of alfareros (potters) and cacharreros (sellers of pottery)

Justa and Rufina (Ruffina) (Spanish: Justa y Rufina) are venerated as martyrs and saints. They are said to have been martyred at Hispalis (Seville) during the 3rd century.

Only Justa (sometimes "Justus" in early manuscripts) is mentioned in the Martyrologium Hieronymianum (93), but in the historical martyrologies. Rufina is also mentioned, following the legendary Acts. The two saints are highly honored in the Mozarabic Liturgy.

== Hagiography ==
Their legend states that they were sisters and natives of Seville who are said to have lived in the neighborhood of Triana. Justa was born in 268 AD, Rufina in 270 AD, of a poor but pious Christian family. They made fine earthenware pottery for a living, with which they supported themselves and helped many of the city's poor. Like many other merchants, they sold their pottery from booths set up out of doors where people could see their wares. During a pagan festival, they refused to sell their wares for use in these celebrations. In anger, locals broke all of their dishes and pots. Justa and Rufina retaliated by smashing an image of Venus. They were immediately arrested.

The city's prefect, Diogenianus, ordered them to be imprisoned. Failing to convince them to renounce their faith, he had them tortured on the rack and with iron hooks. They were then forced to walk barefoot to the Sierra Morena; when this did not break their resolve, they were imprisoned without water or food. Justa died first. Her body, thrown into a well, was later recovered by the Bishop Sabinus. Diogenianus believed that the death of Justa would break the resolve of Rufina. Rufina refused to renounce her faith and was thus thrown to the lions. However the lions in the amphitheatre refused to attack Rufina, remaining as docile as house cats. Infuriated, Diogenianus had Rufina's neck broken and her body burned. Her remains were recovered by Sabinus and buried alongside her sister.

== Veneration ==
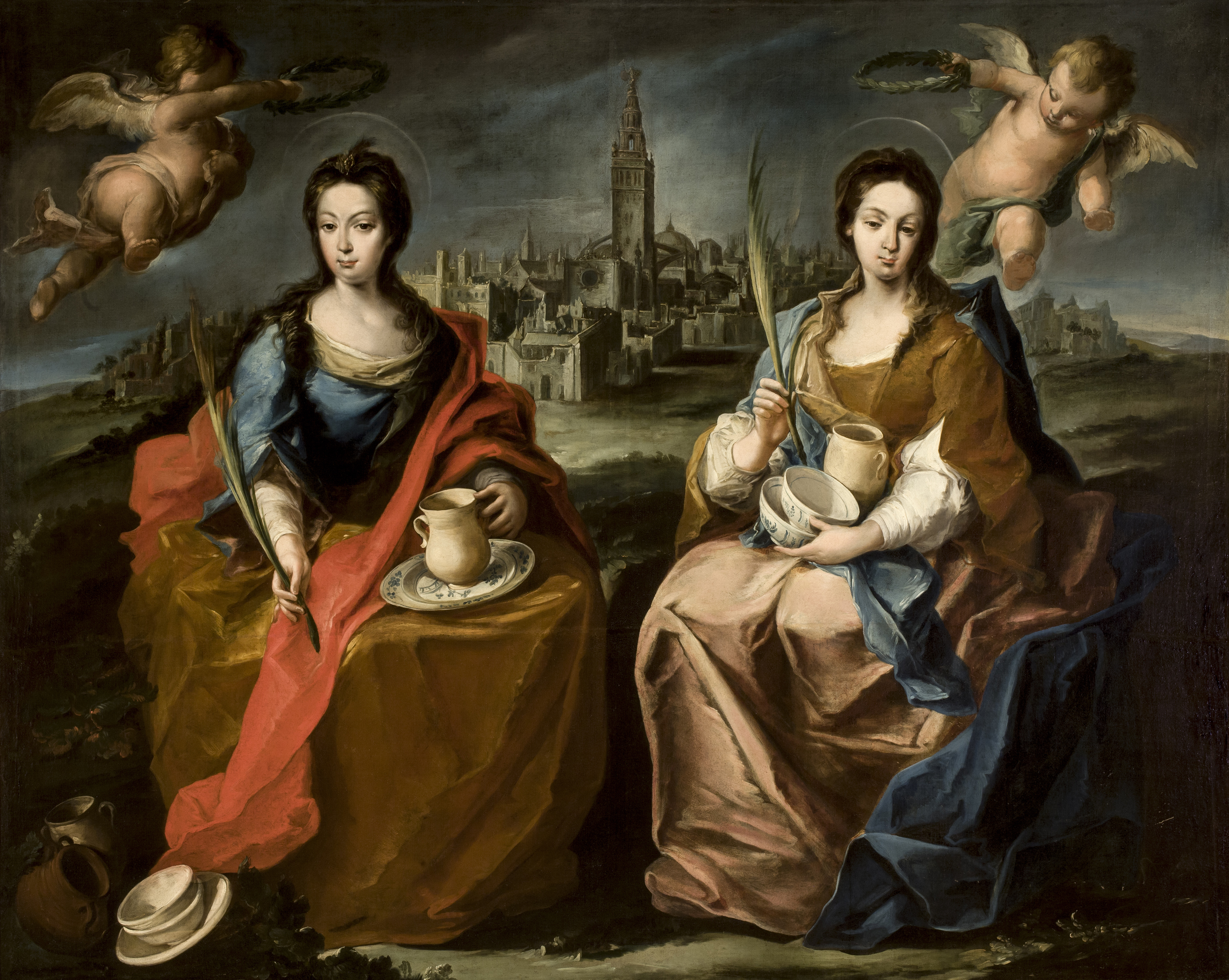
Santas Justa y Rufina, by Juan de Espinal (Ayuntamiento de Sevilla)

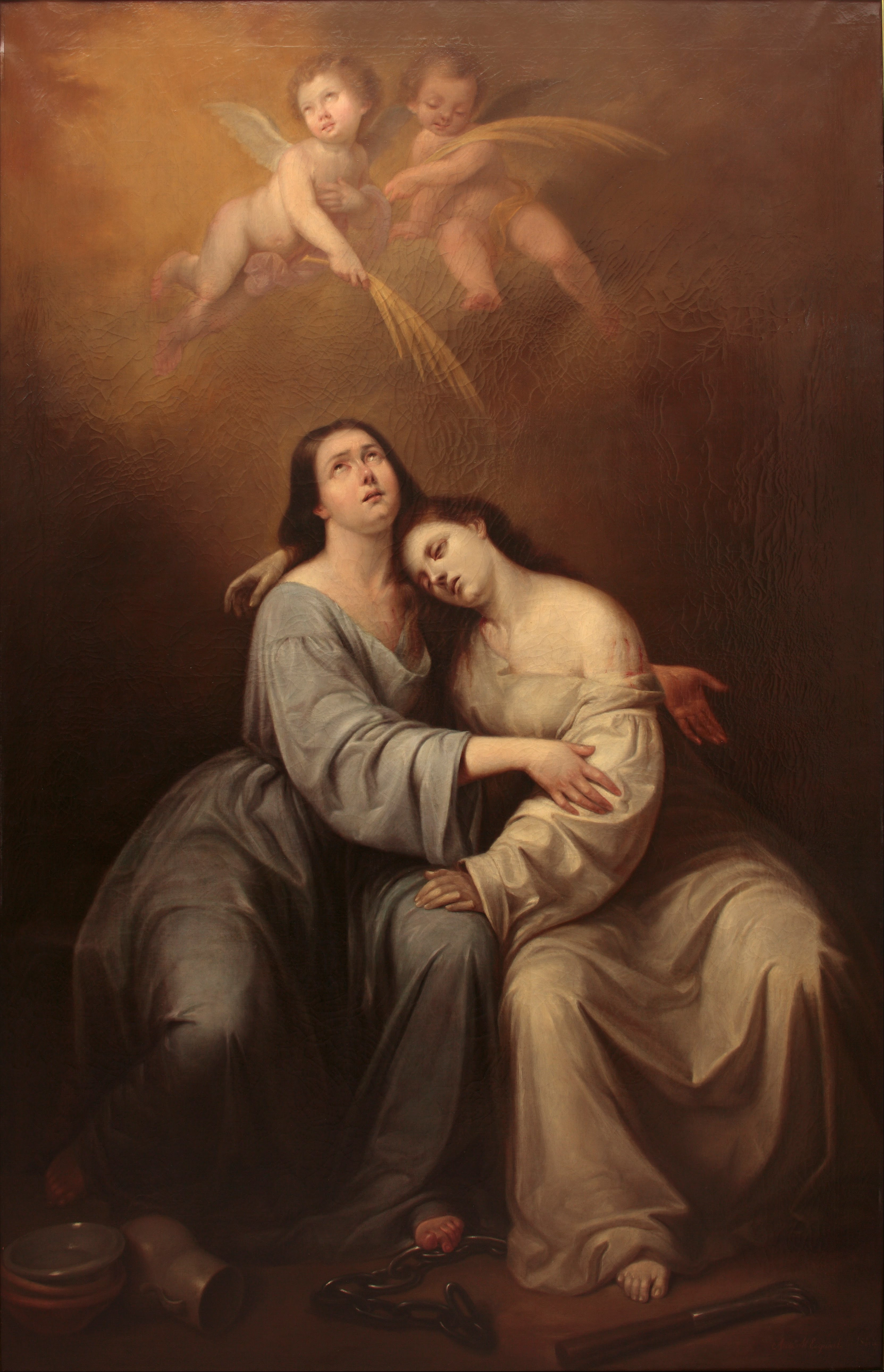
Saint Justa and Saint Rufina by Antonio María Esquivel

Their cult in Seville was ancient and strong, and soon spread elsewhere in Spain.

La Seo Cathedral (Zaragoza) contains a chapel dedicated to Justa and Rufina. Agost, in Valencia province, is the location of a hermitage dedicated to these saints (Ermita de Santa Justa y Rufina), built in 1821. Toledo also has a church dedicated to them.

There is a shrine to the saints in Alicante where a three-day fiesta is held in their honor in July.

=== Patronage ===
Justa and Rufina are the patron saints of the cities Seville and Orihuela, where there is a parish Church of Saints Justa and Rufina built on the site of a Visigoth church that was later used as a mosque. They are also the patrons of potters.

According to tradition, they are protectors of the Giralda and the Cathedral of Seville, and are said to have protected both during the Lisbon earthquake of 1755.

=== Feast day ===
Their feast day is 19 July. During the Middle Ages their feast was celebrated in the Iberian Peninsula on 17 July, as attested by calendars of the time, such as for example by that in the Antiphonary of León.

=== Iconography ===
They are often depicted as young women with their heads uncovered (indicating their status as unmarried), with clay pots, palms (representing martyrdom), and a lion licking Rufina's bare foot. As patrons of Seville, they are often pictured flanking the Giralda.

== In art ==
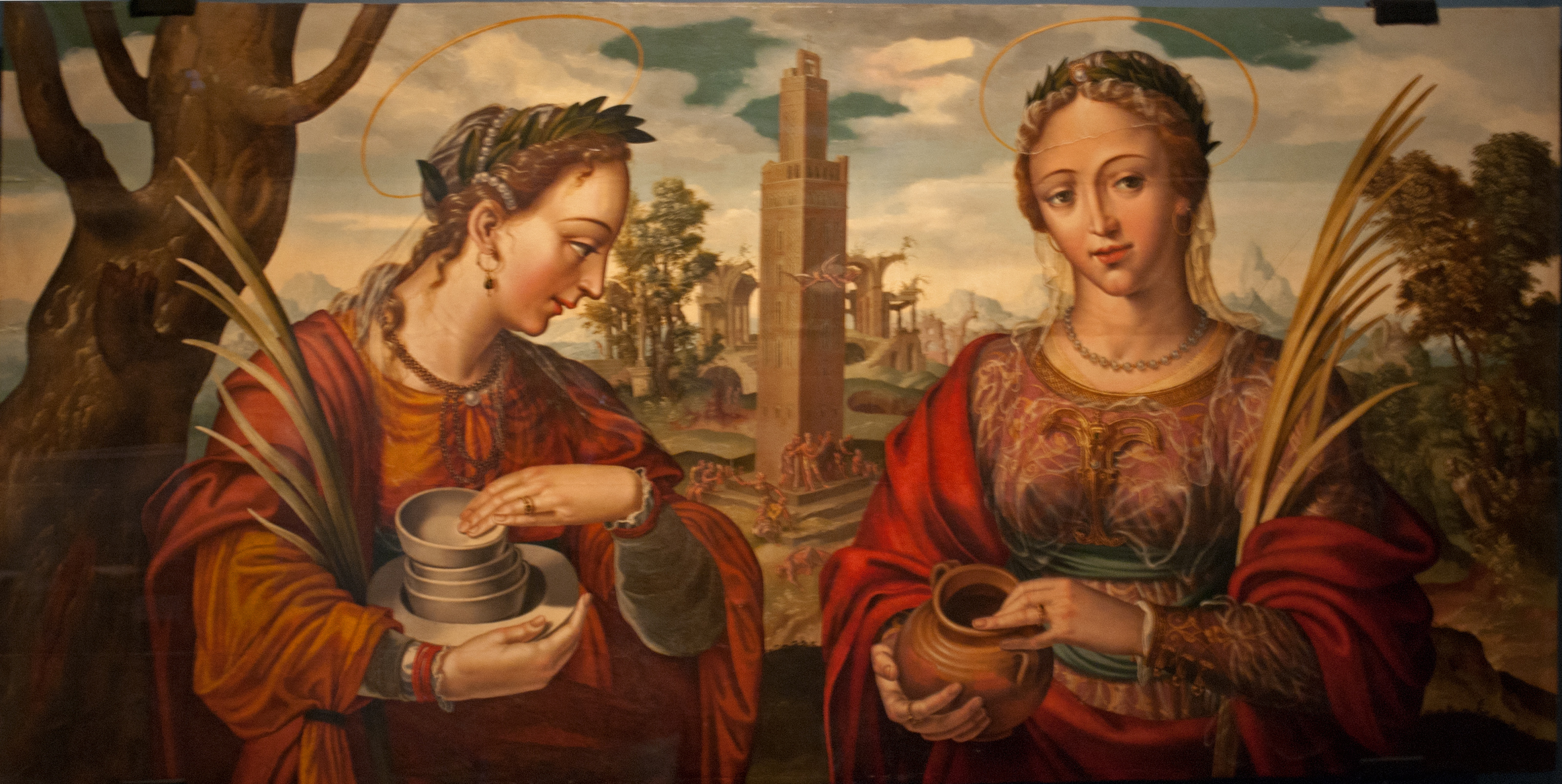
Santas Justa y Rufina, de Hernando de Esturmio (Altarpiece of the Chapel of the Evangelists in the cathedral of Seville)

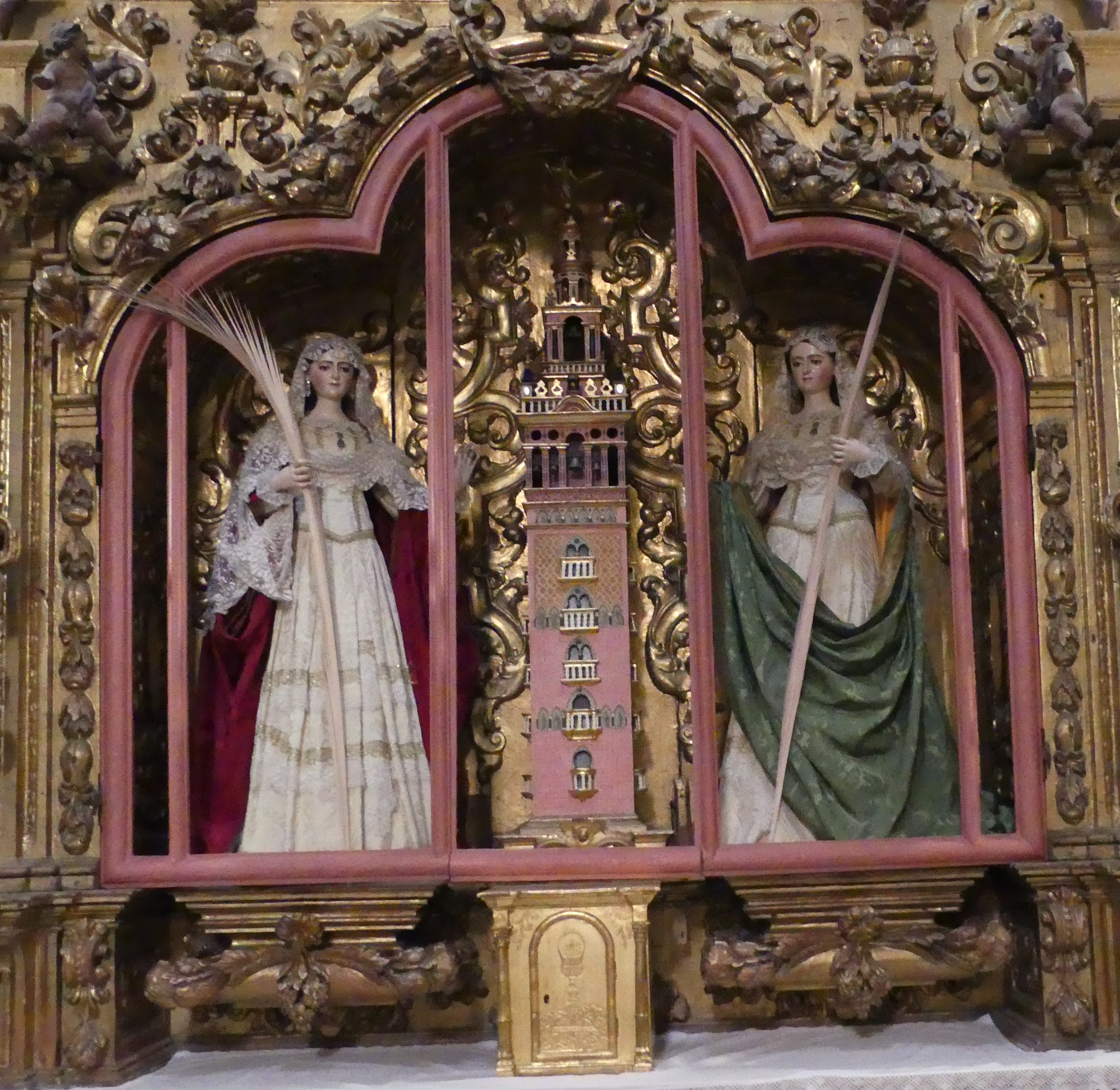
Saints Justa and Rufina with the Giralda, Church of Santa Ana. Seville, Andalusia

Justa and Rufina were a popular subject for Spanish artists.

A 1540 retable is the earliest known piece of artwork depicting these two saints. A painting of the saints was done by Francisco Camilo in 1644. Goya,Murillo, and Zurbarán also painted these saints.

A 1989 painting is a modern interpretation of these saints.

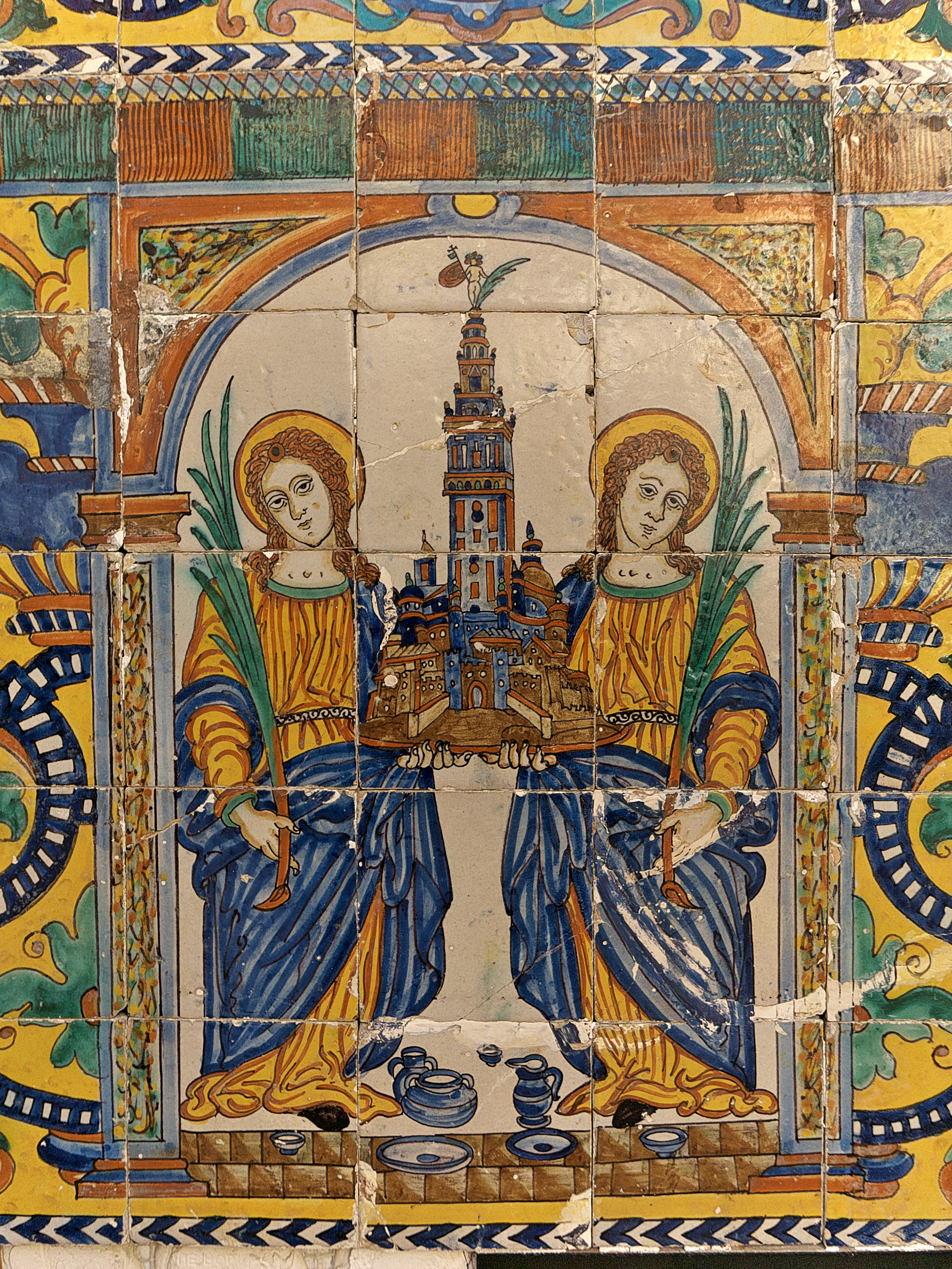
Santas Justa y Rufina (Hernando de Valladares (es).)

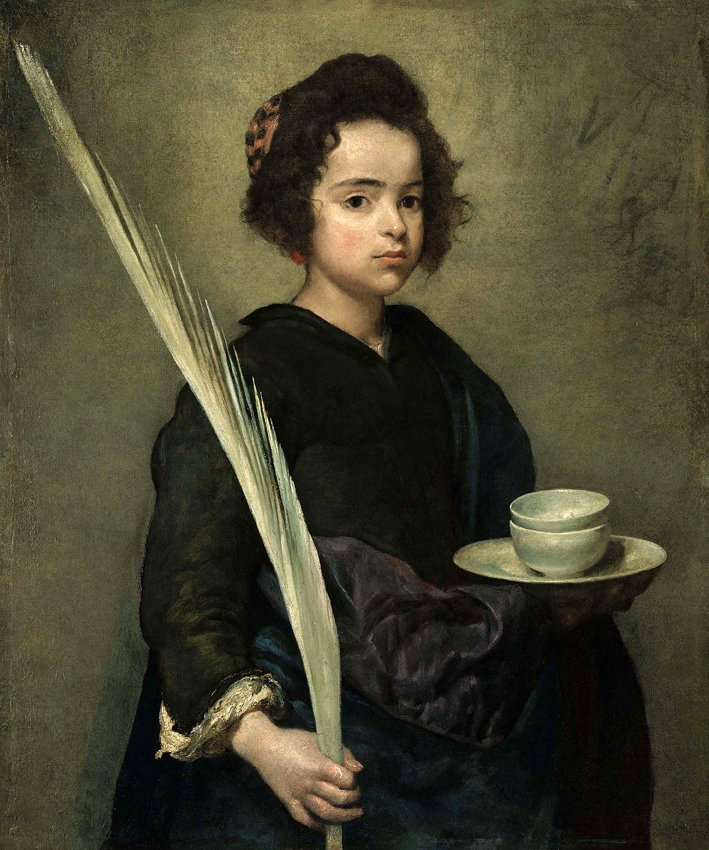
Saint Rufina, by Diego Velázquez

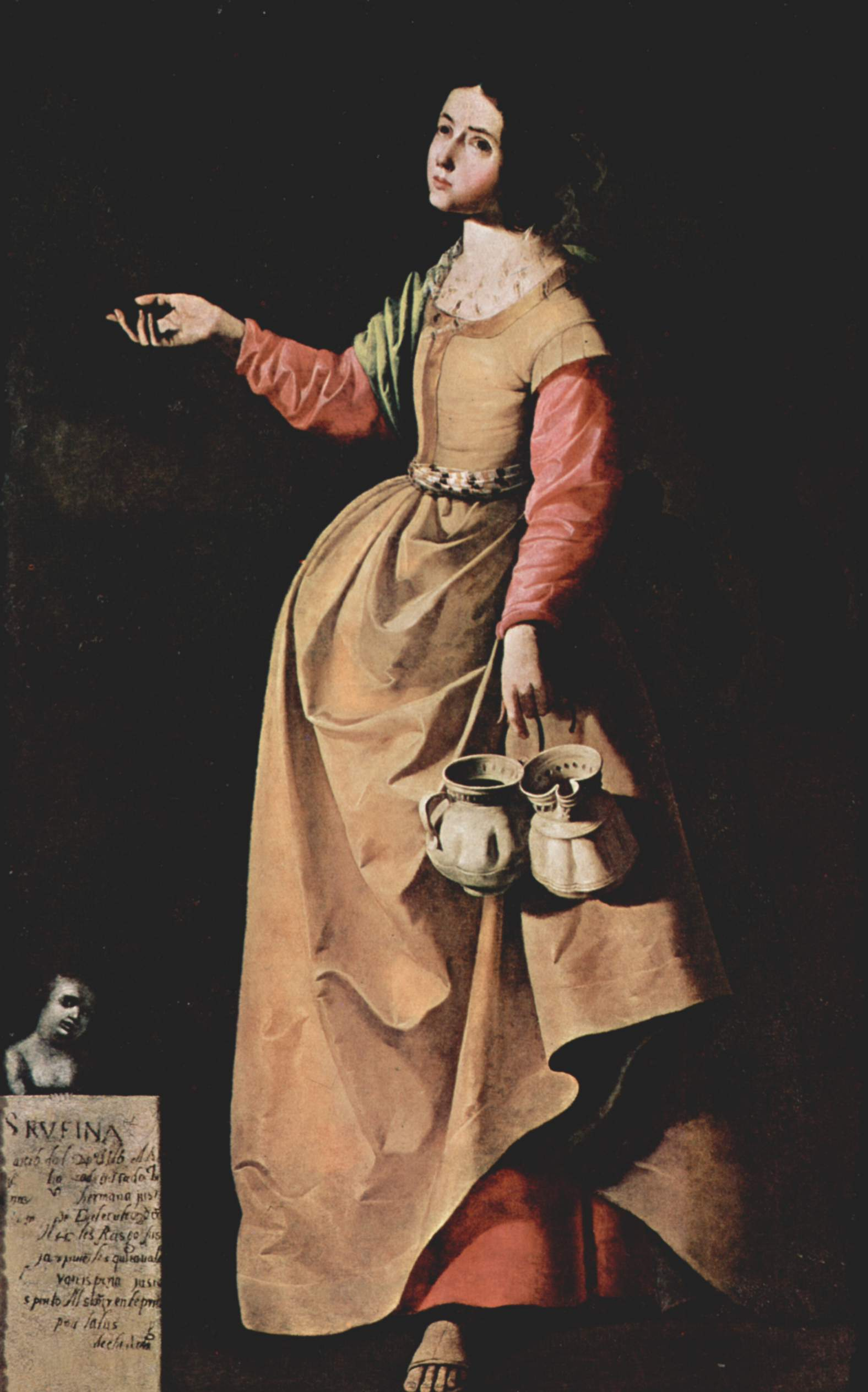
Saint Rufina, by Zurbarán

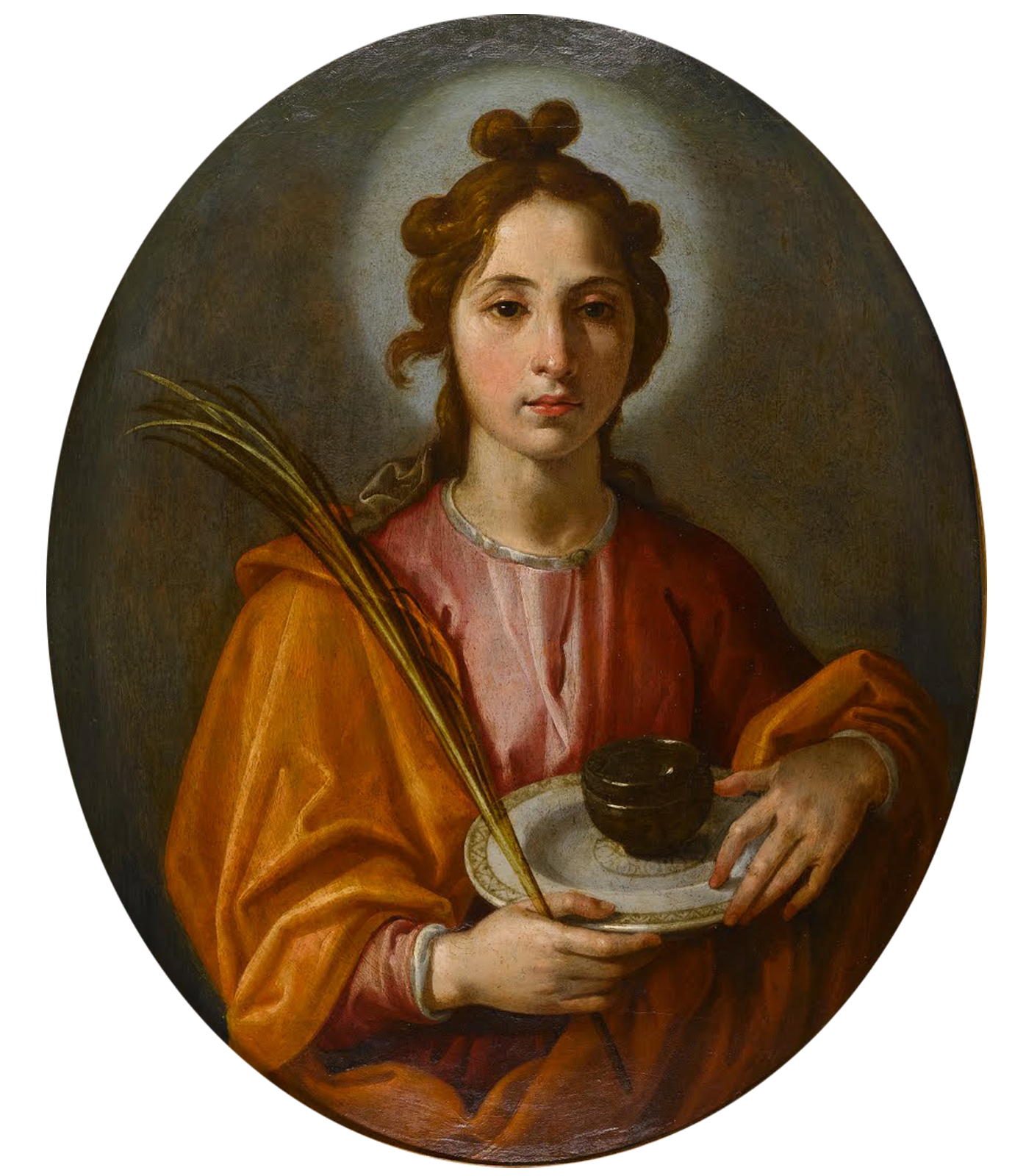
Saint Justa by Francisco Pacheco

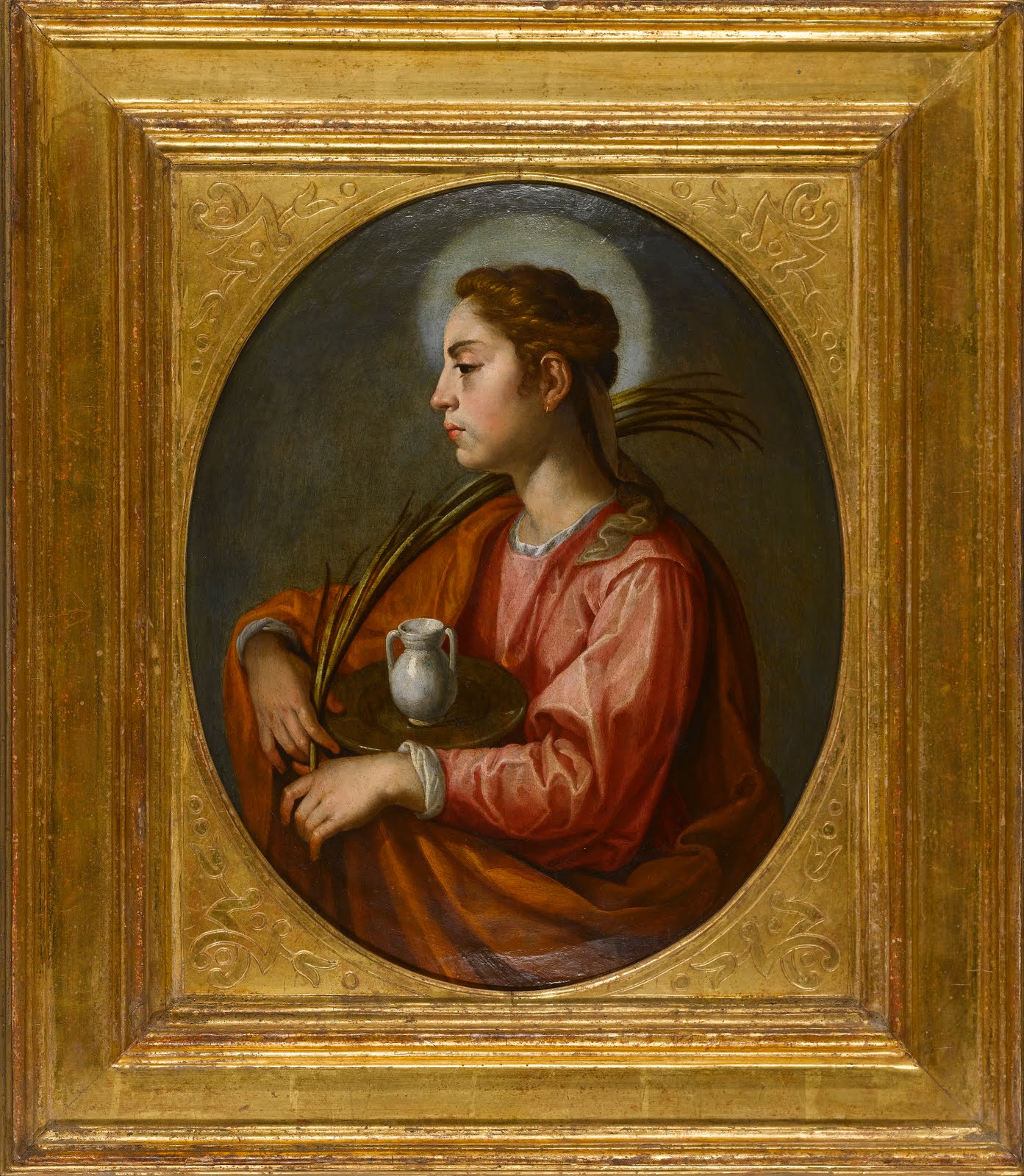
Saint Rufina by Francisco Pacheco
