= Giralda (Kansas City) =

Tower in Kansas City, Missouri

Coordinates: 39°02′31″N 94°35′18″W

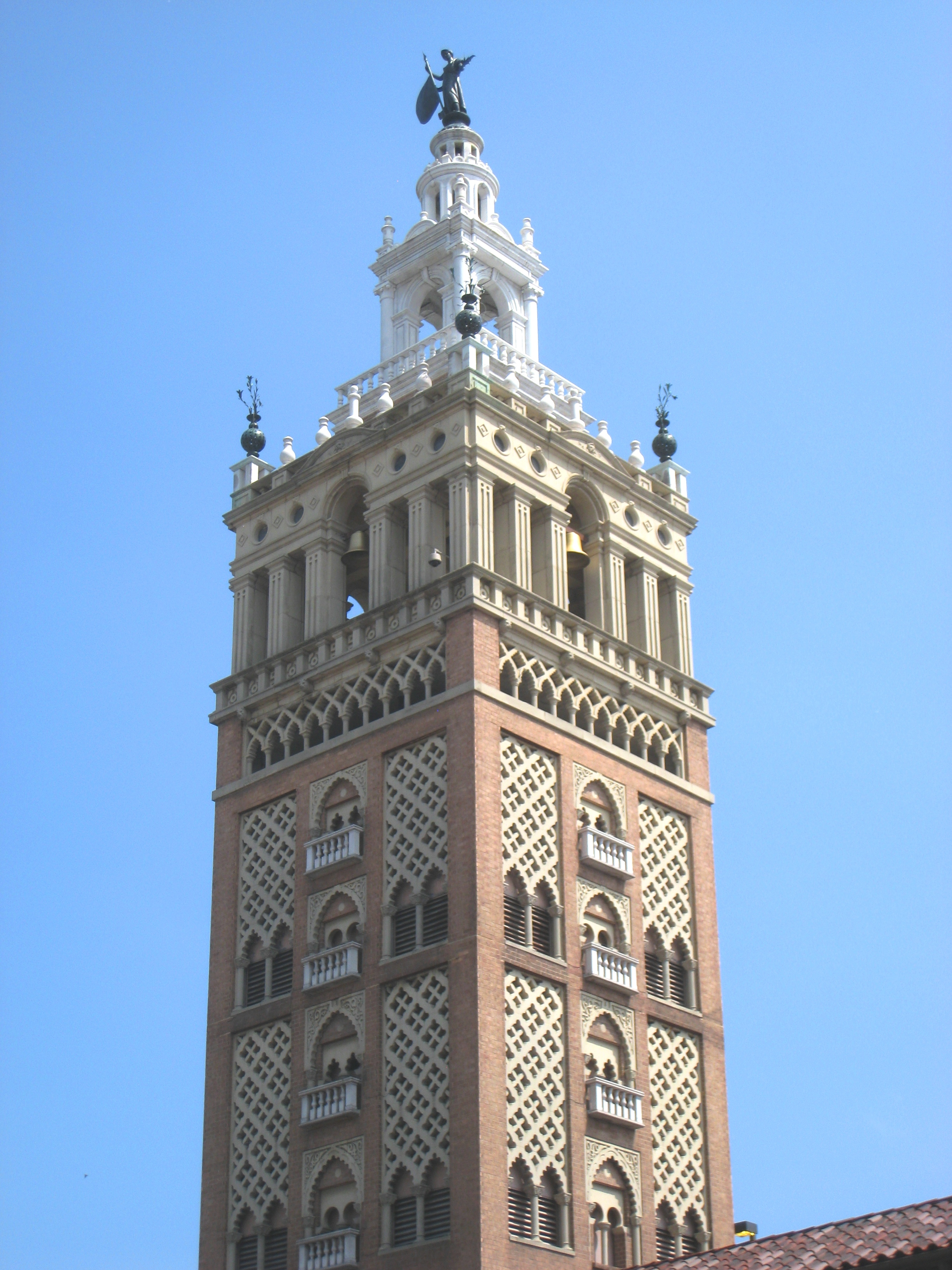

The Giralda is the name of a landmark in Kansas City, Missouri. It stands 138 feet (42 m) tall at the corner of West 47th Street and Mill Creek Parkway.

When urban developer J.C. Nichols visited Seville, Spain in the 1920s, he was so impressed with the 12th-century Moorish tower of Giralda that he built a half-scale replica in the Country Club Plaza. The tower was officially christened by then-Seville mayor Felix Morena de la Cova, along with an official delegate in 1967, the same year in which the two cities became sister cities. The original Giralda tower was the minaret of the 12th century Muslim mosque; a Christian belfry was added in 1568.
