= Giralda =

Bell tower of Seville Cathedral in Seville, Spain

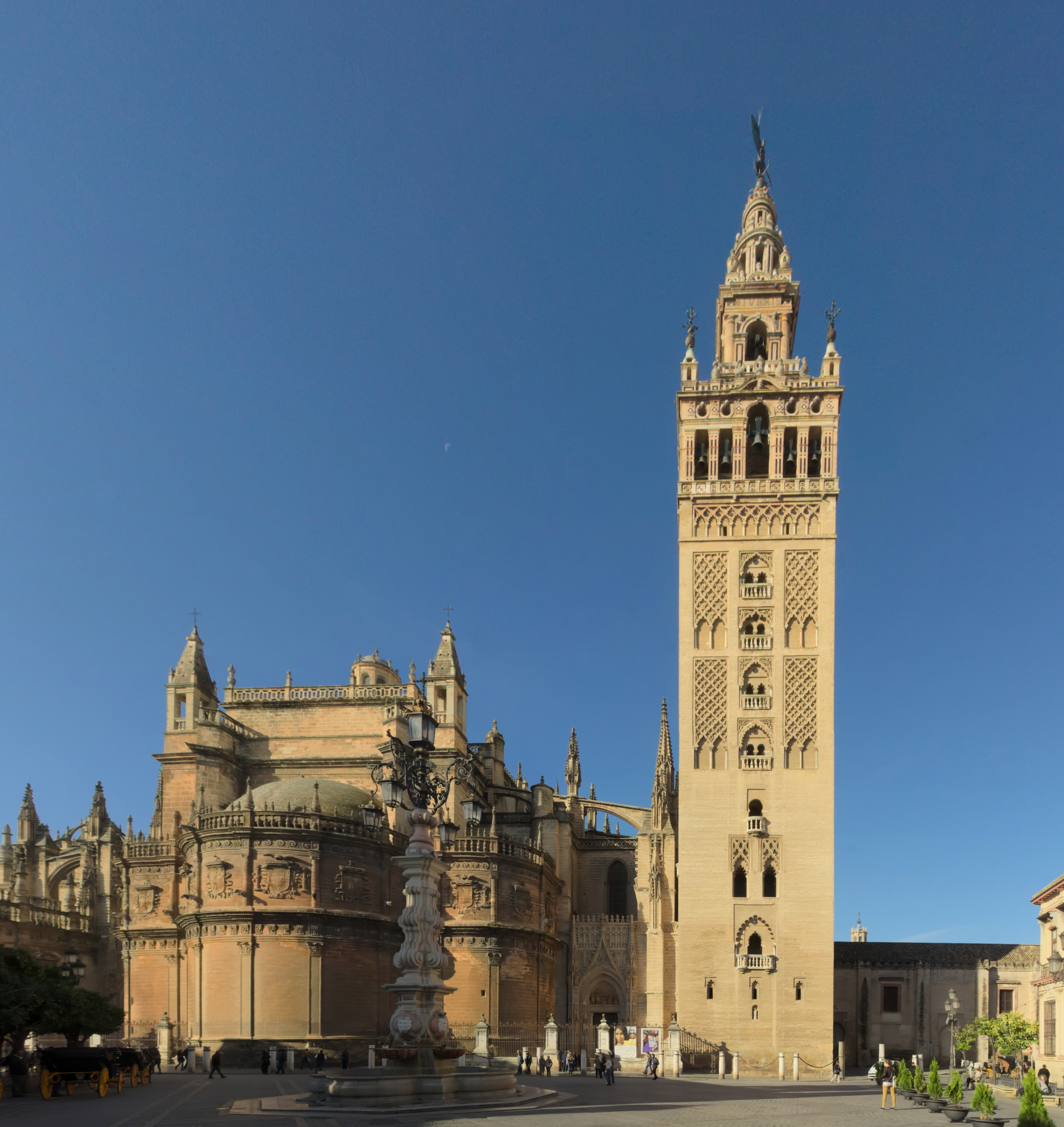
- La Giralda

General information
- Type: Bell tower
- Architectural style: Moorish (Almohad), Renaissance
- Location: Seville, Spain
- Coordinates: 37°23′10.3″N 5°59′32.7″W

UNESCO World Heritage Site
- Part of: Cathedral, Alcázar and Archivo de Indias in Seville
- Criteria: Cultural: (i), (ii), (iii), (vi)
- Reference: 383
- Inscription: 1987 (11th Session)
- Extensions: 2010

Spanish Cultural Heritage
- Type: Non-movable
- Criteria: Monument
- Designated: 29 December 1928
- Part of: Seville Cathedral
- Reference no.: RI-51-0000329

The Giralda (Spanish: La Giralda [la xiˈɾalda]) is the bell tower of Seville Cathedral in Seville, Spain. It was built as the minaret for the Great Mosque of Seville in al-Andalus, during the reign of the Almohad dynasty, with a Renaissance-style belfry added by the Catholics after the expulsion of the Muslims from the area. The cathedral, including the Giralda, was registered in 1987 as a World Heritage Site by UNESCO, along with the Alcázar and the General Archive of the Indies. It remains one of the most important symbols of the city, as it has been since the Middle Ages. The tower is one of the most famous monuments of Moorish architecture in Spain and one of the most refined examples of Almohad architecture.

== Origin ==
=== Initial construction ===
The mosque was built to replace the older Mosque of Ibn 'Addabas, built in the 9th century under Umayyad rule, since the congregation had grown larger than that modest mosque could accommodate. It was commissioned in 1171 by caliph Abu Ya'qub Yusuf. Sevillian architect Ahmad Ibn Baso, who had led other construction projects for the caliph, was in charge of designing the mosque. Construction was slowed down by the redirection of an existing city sewer that needed to be moved to accommodate the broad foundation for the building, an engineering obstacle that slowed progress by four years.

From the beginning, craftsmen from all over Al-Andalus and the Maghreb were enlisted in the mosque's planning, construction, and decoration, and the caliph himself was highly invested in the process and was said to have visited the site daily. By 1176, the mosque was complete, save for the minaret; however, Friday prayer was not held there until 1182.

=== Building of the Minaret ===
Upon returning to al-Andalus in 1184 for a new military campaign, Aby Ya'qub Yusuf ordered the construction of the minaret. However, construction halted that same year with the death of the architect and, a month and a half later, the caliph, who died while commanding the Siege of Santarém. His son, Abu Yusuf Yaqub al-Mansur, ordered construction on the minaret to continue upon his accession in 1184, but the work stalled again soon after and did not restart until 1188. Ahmad Ibn Baso had begun the base of the tower in cut stone and his work was continued by a Maghrebi Berber architect named 'Ali al-Ghumari, who was responsible for building the main body of the minaret in brick, and completed by Sicilian architect Abu Layth Al-Siqilli, who built the small secondary shaft at the top of the tower. The minaret was built using both local bricks and recycled marble from old Umayyad monuments. On 10 March 1198, the tower was completed with the addition of the finial (jāmūr) of four precious metal spheres (either gold or bronze) at the tower's peak to commemorate al-Mansur's victory over Alfonso VIII of Castile, which had taken place four years prior.

== Structure and decoration ==
=== The mosque ===
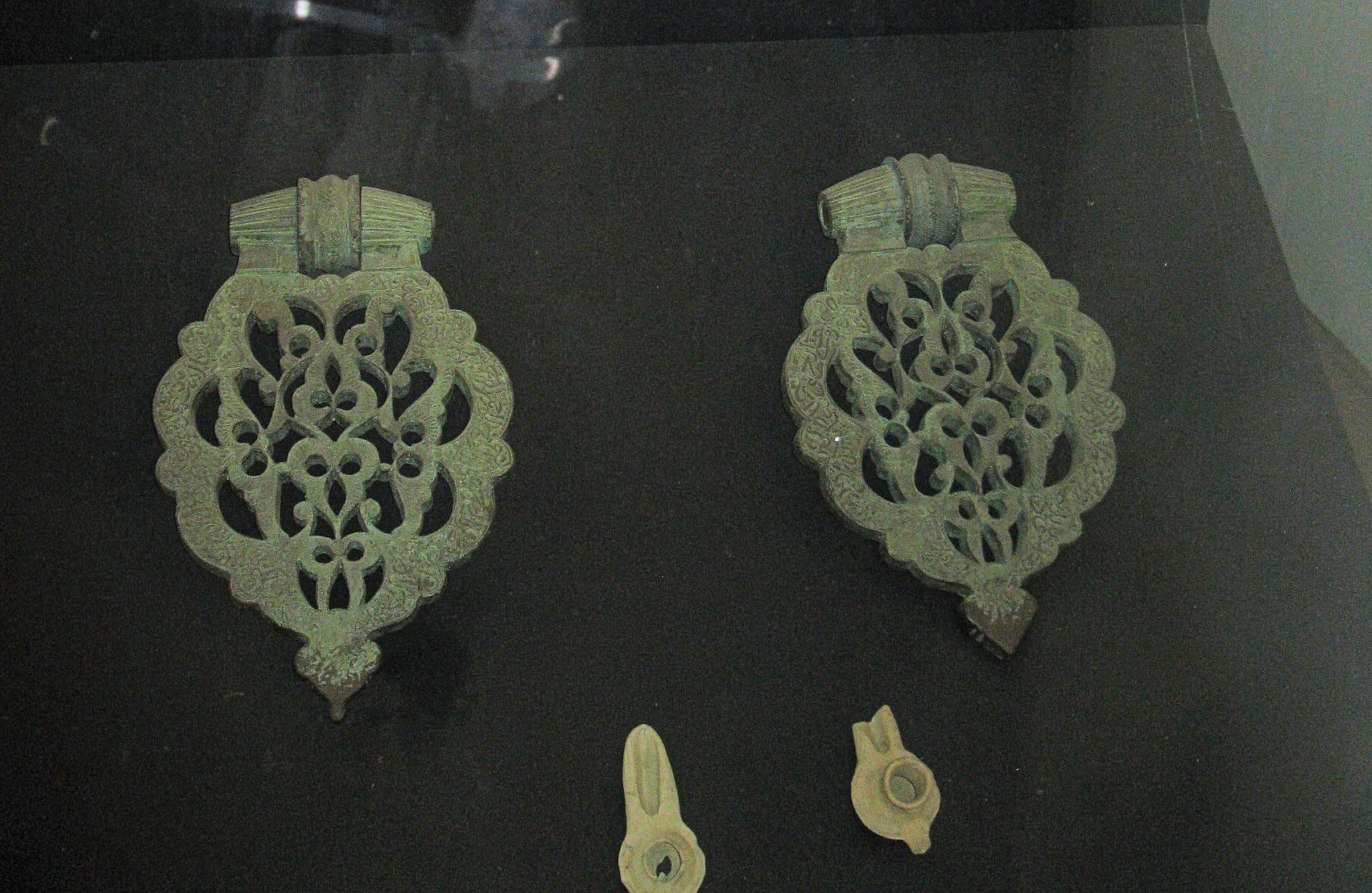
Original door knockers of the Puerta del Perdón (northern gate), on display inside the Giralda today

Before its partial destruction in a 1356 earthquake, the mosque was comparable in size to the great mosque of Cordoba and its walls faced the cardinal directions with mathematical preciseness. It had a rectangular floor plan measuring approximately 113 by 135 meters. The prayer hall was symmetrical and airy, with a still-extant courtyard, the Patio de los Naranjos, or "Courtyard of Orange Trees." Its interior had a stucco-carved dome over the mihrab, as well as several matching carvings over the arched doorways. The minbar was decorated in a Cordoban style, constructed from expensive wood and embellished with sandalwood, ivory, ebony, gold, and silver. The main northern entrance to the courtyard, the present-day Puerta del Perdón, contains a bronze-plated door with geometric decoration and floral knockers. The current knockers in place are replicas of the originals which are on display inside the Giralda tower.

=== The minaret ===
The minaret of the mosque still stands as the Giralda. The base at street level is a square of 13.6 m (45 ft) on the side and which sits on a solid foundation which is a bit wider, 15–16 m (49.21–52.49 ft) and about 5 m (16 ft) deep. The foundation is built with solid, rectangular stones, some taken and reused from the nearby walls of the former Abbadid palace and from the Roman city walls. The tower consists of two sections: the main shaft and a much smaller second shaft, superimposed on top of it, which is enveloped today by the Renaissance-era belfry. The main shaft is 50.51 m (165.7 ft) tall and the second shaft is 14.39 m (47.2 ft) tall and has a square base measuring 6.83 m (22.4 ft). The tower contains a series of 35 ramps winding around the perimeter of seven vaulted chambers at the tower's core. These ramps were designed with enough width and height to accommodate "beasts of burden, people, and the custodians," according to one chronicler from the era.

The decorated facades and windows on the tower are stepped to match the ramps in order to maximize light to the chambers inside. This exterior brick decoration was mainly done by 'Ali al-Ghumari, who also did repair work on the mosque. The decoration of the façades is divided into three equal vertical zones. The middle zone is occupied by the windows that provide light to the interior ramp passage. These windows vary in form from single horseshoe-arch openings to double-arched openings with polylobed (multifoil) profiles and a central marble column. They are generally framed by an ornate blind arch with marble columns on the sides and arabesque carvings in the spandrels. The two other vertical zones of the facades feature large panels of sebka motifs, each of which springs from a blind arcade of polylobed arches supported on marble columns. The top of the main shaft is decorated by another blind arcade forming a horizontal band of intersecting polylobed arches. The marble columns used throughout these areas feature spoliated Umayyad-era capitals from the 9th-10th centuries in the style of Madinat al-Zahra. Leopoldo Torres Balbás counted 92 such capitals reused in the tower. The facades of the tower did contain some plaster embellishment, but they were removed during a modern restoration. The top edge of the tower's main shaft was originally crowned by stepped or sawtooth-shaped merlons, as was common with other contemporary minarets in the region. The small secondary shaft at the top of the minaret also features sebka and blind arch decoration, though this is only visible from inside the belfry today.

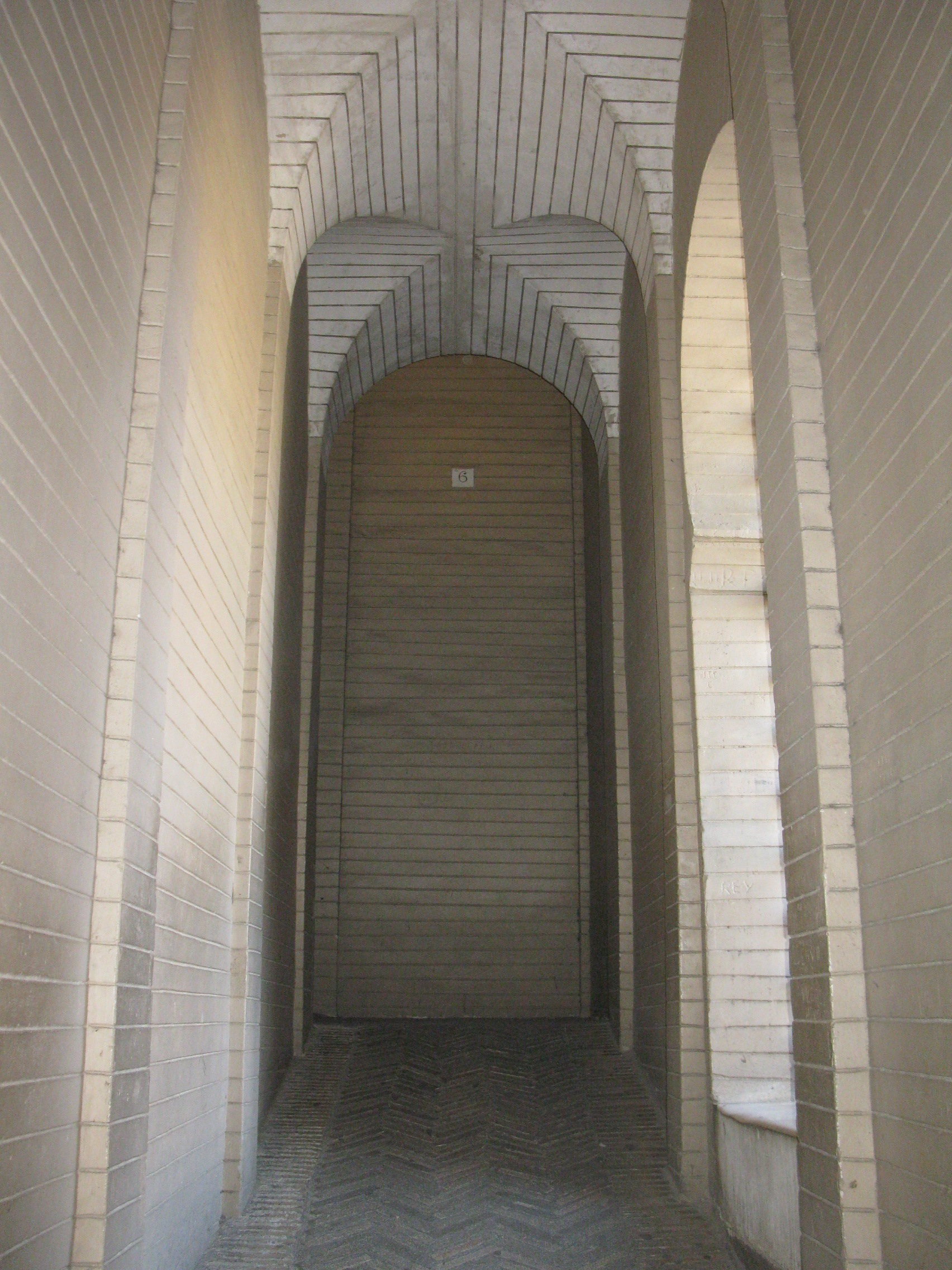
Ramp passage inside the tower

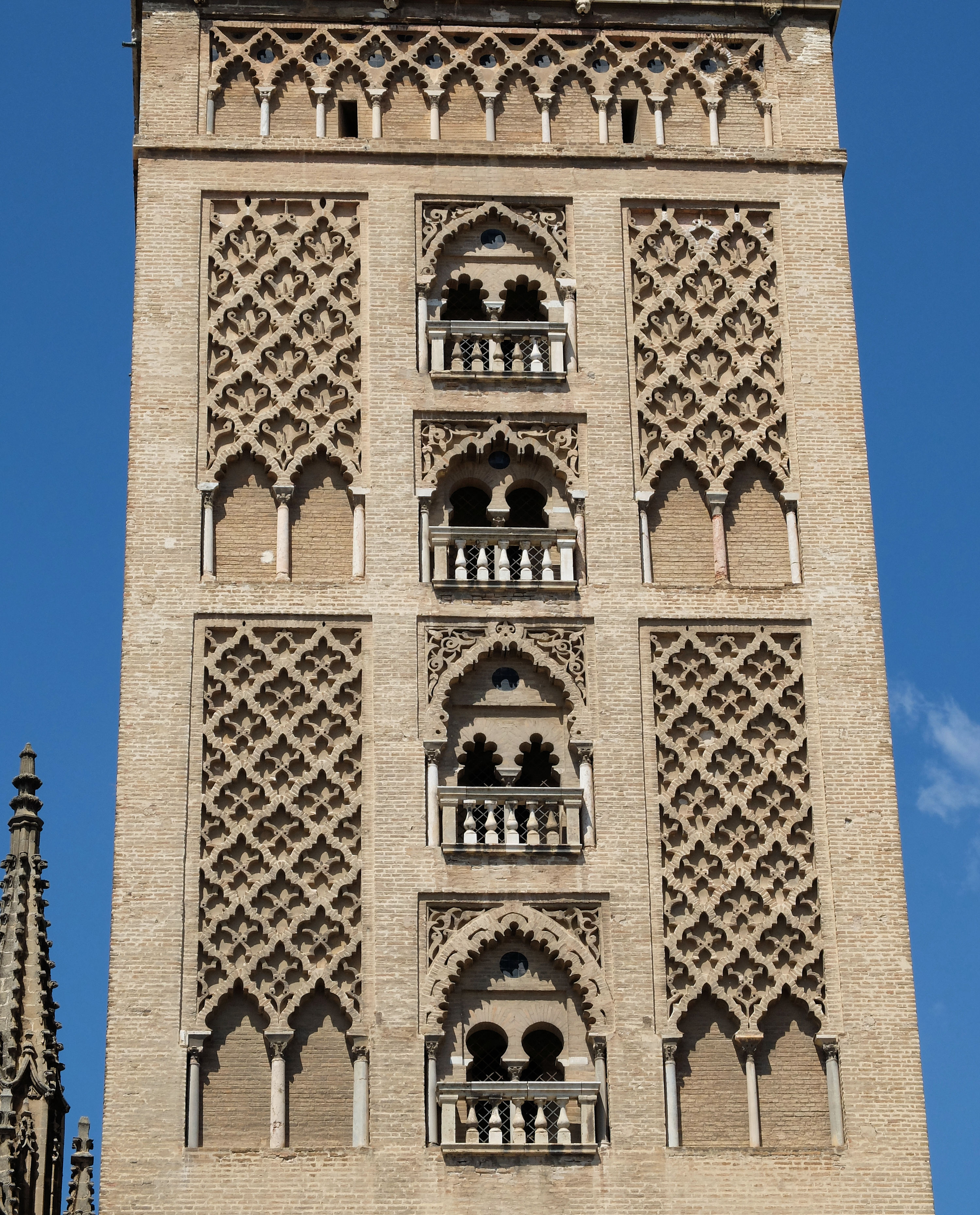
Almohad-era decoration on the east façade of the tower

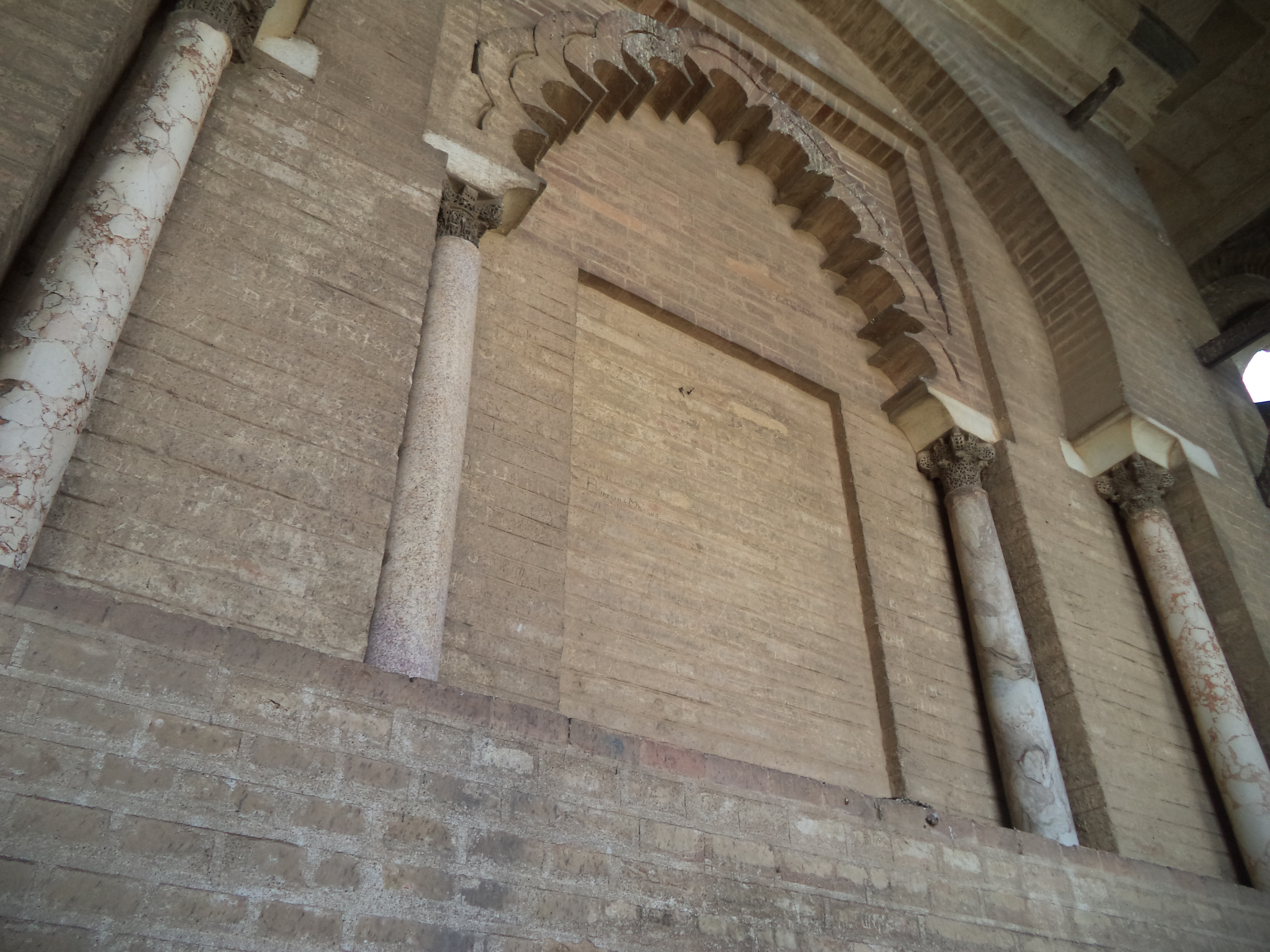
Almohad decoration on the secondary shaft at the top of the tower (inside the belfry today)

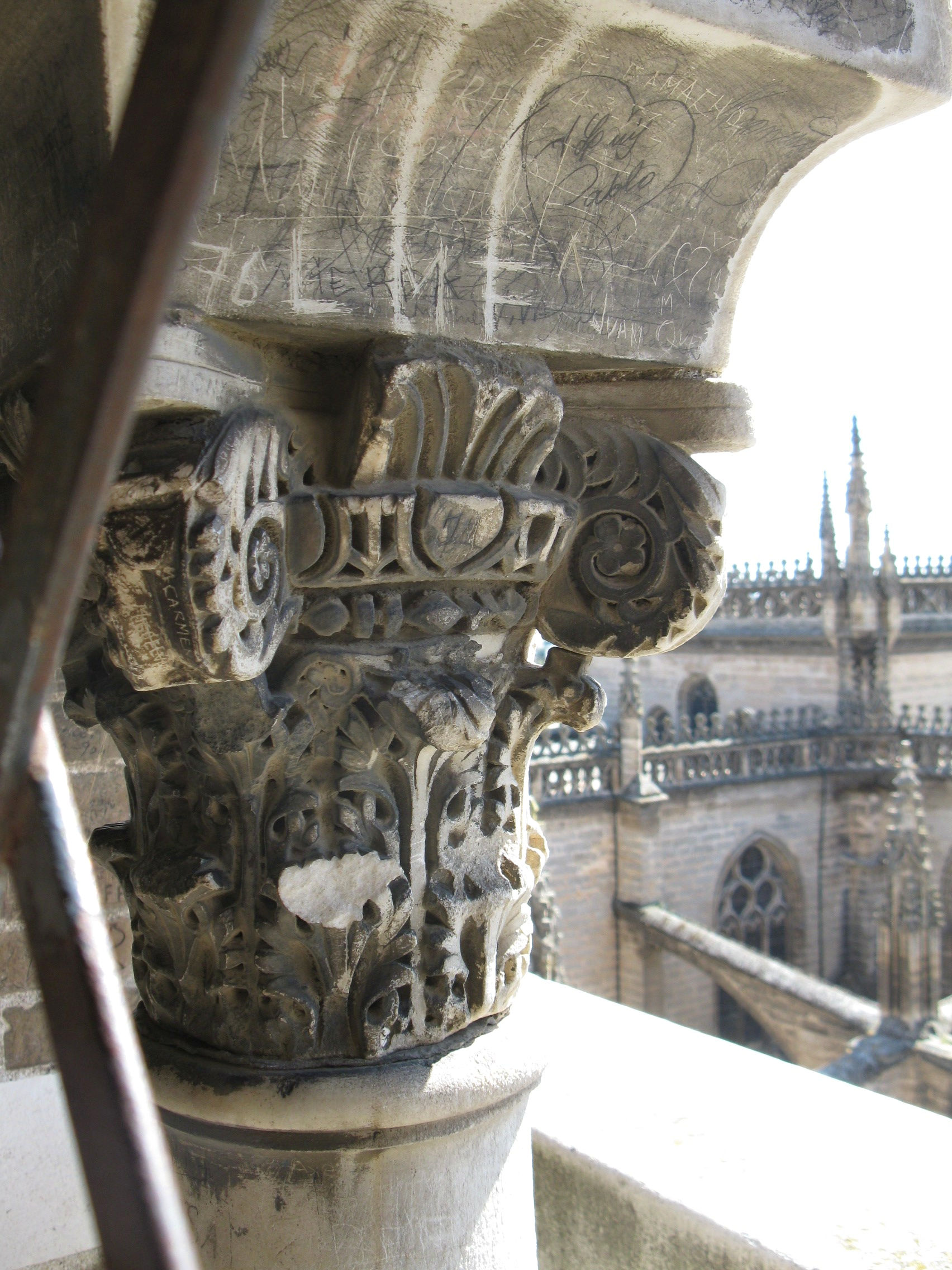
Umayyad-era capital (9th-10th century) re-used in one of the windows of the tower

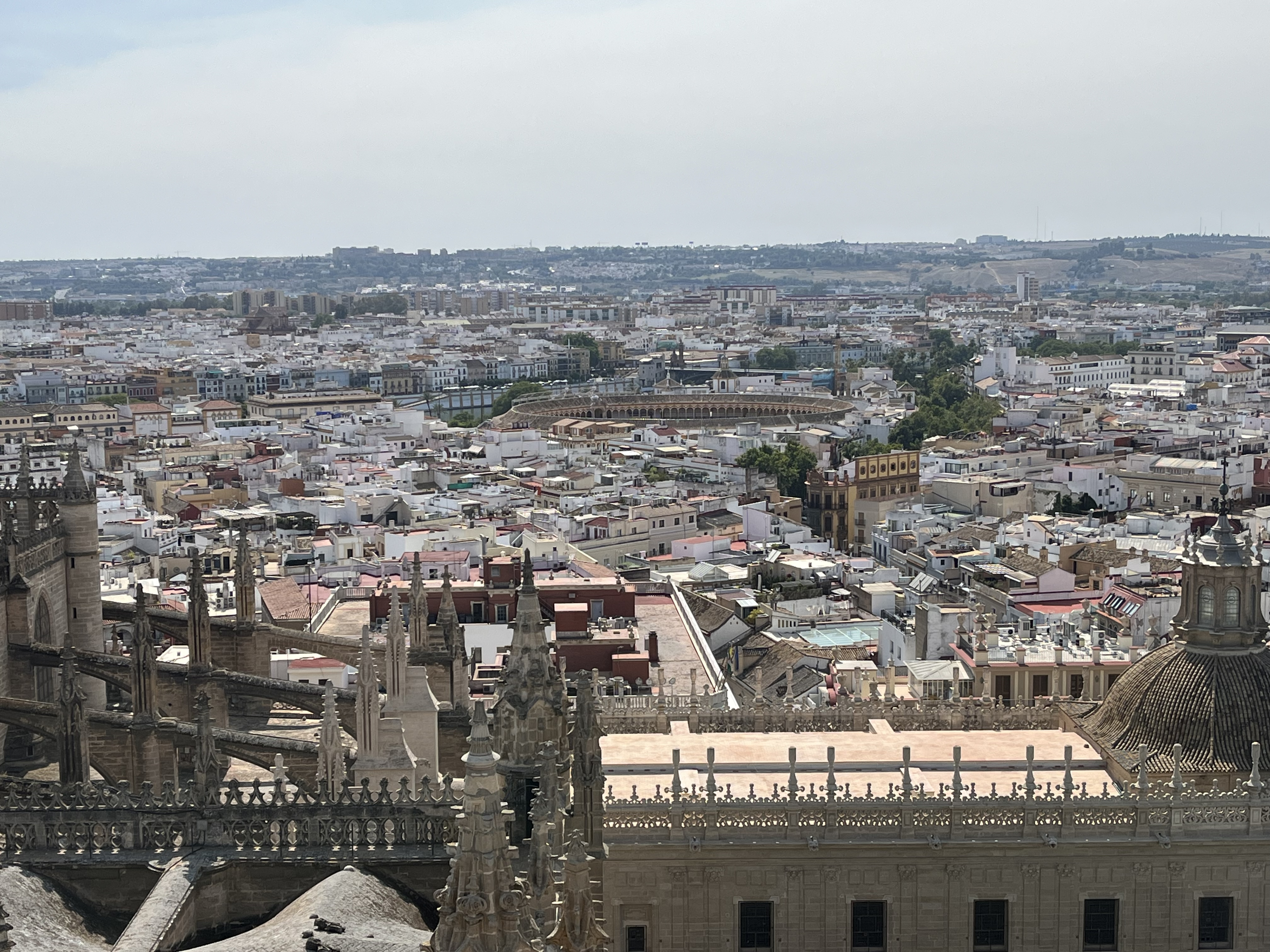
A view from the top of the Giralda Tower facing west

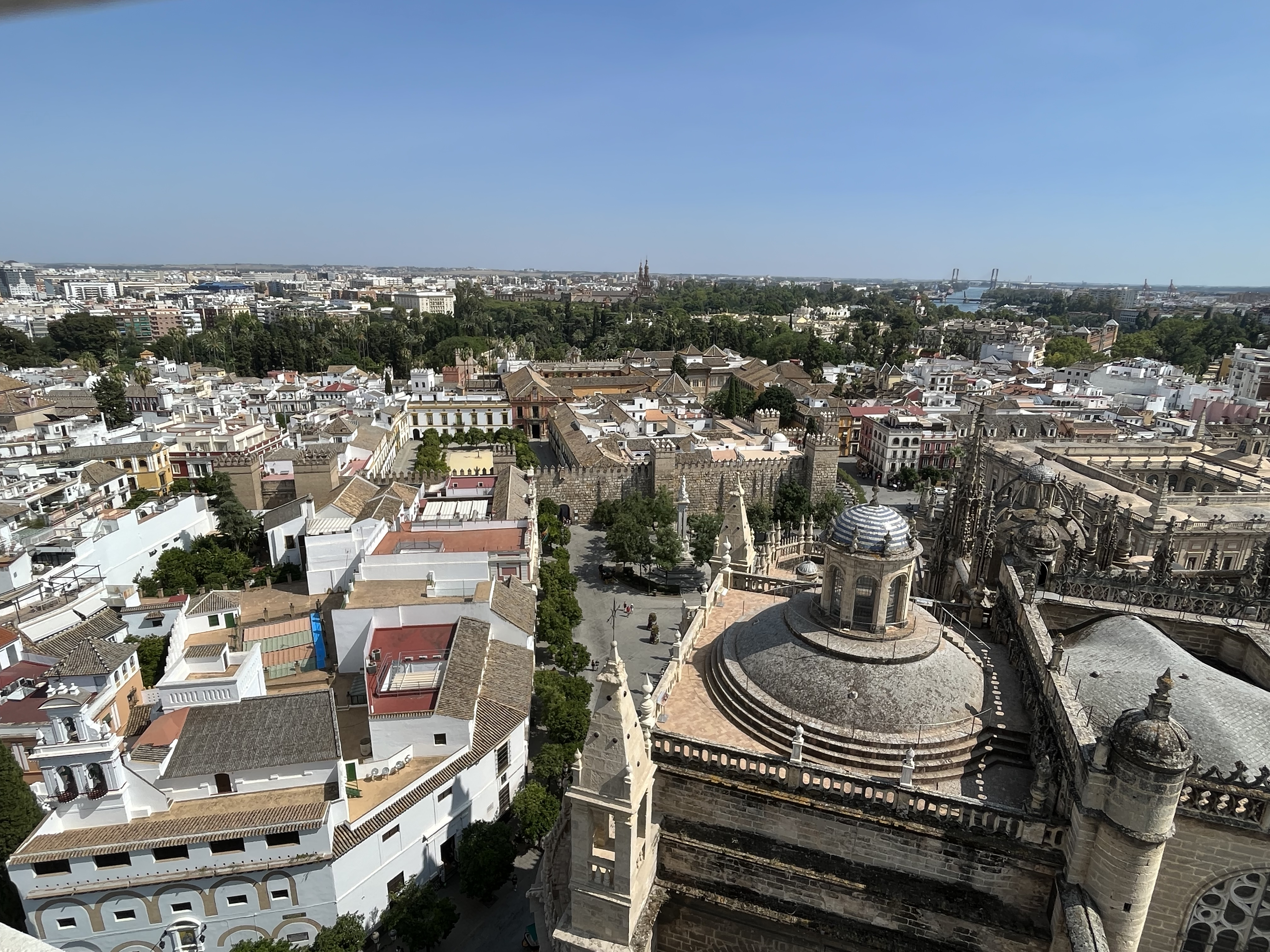
A view out a window halfway up the Giralda Tower to the south

== Post-Al-Andalus ==
=== Conversion to cathedral ===
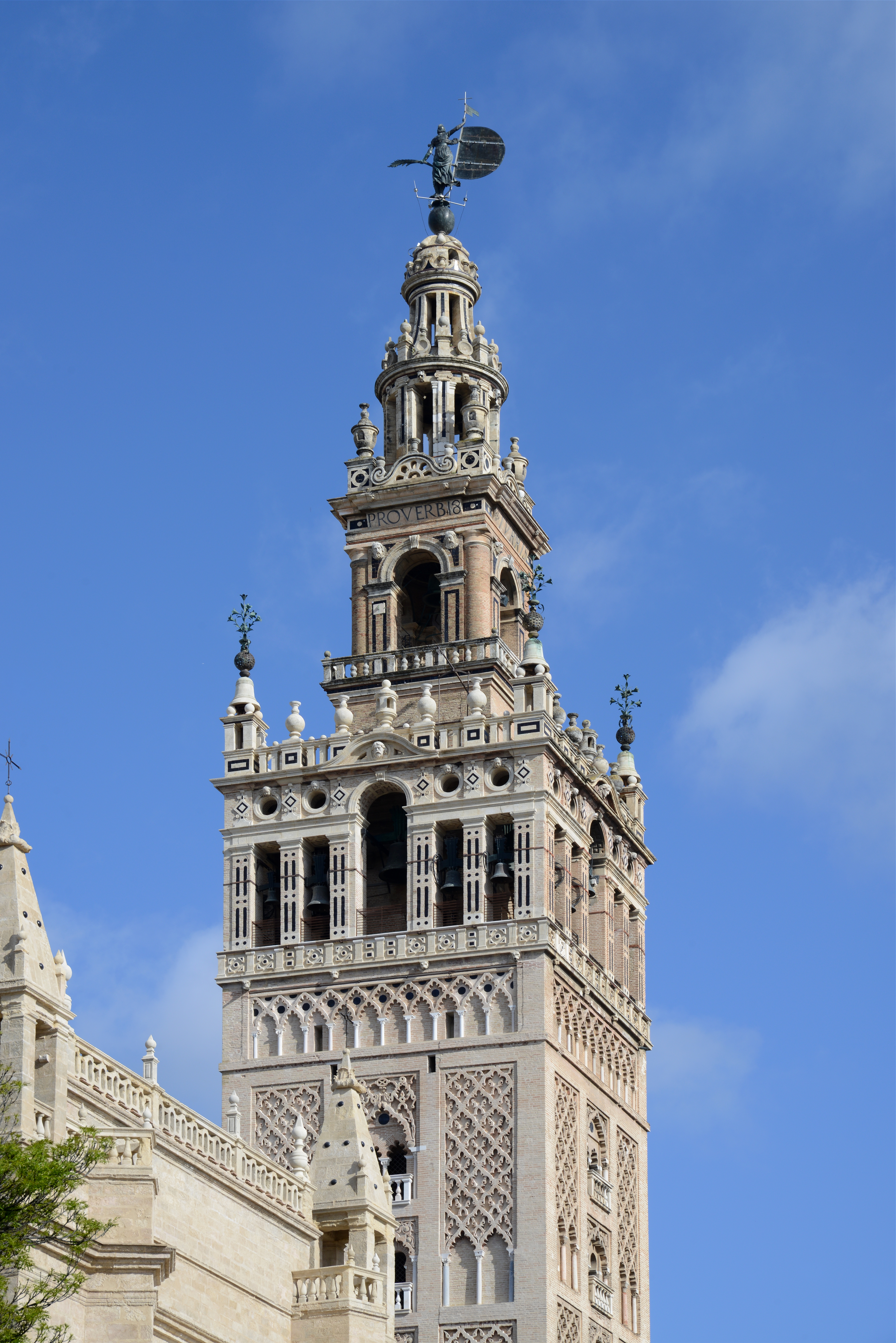
View of the 16th-century belfry at the top of the tower

After Seville was taken by the Christians in 1248 during the Reconquista, the city's mosque was symbolically converted into a cathedral. This involved changing the liturgical orientation, closing and screening off exits and archways, and creating several small family chapels. The former mosque was not well-maintained by any of the groups inhabiting their own sections of the building during this period, and most of the records from the 13th and early 14th centuries describe its neglect, damage, and consequent destruction to make way for a new cathedral.

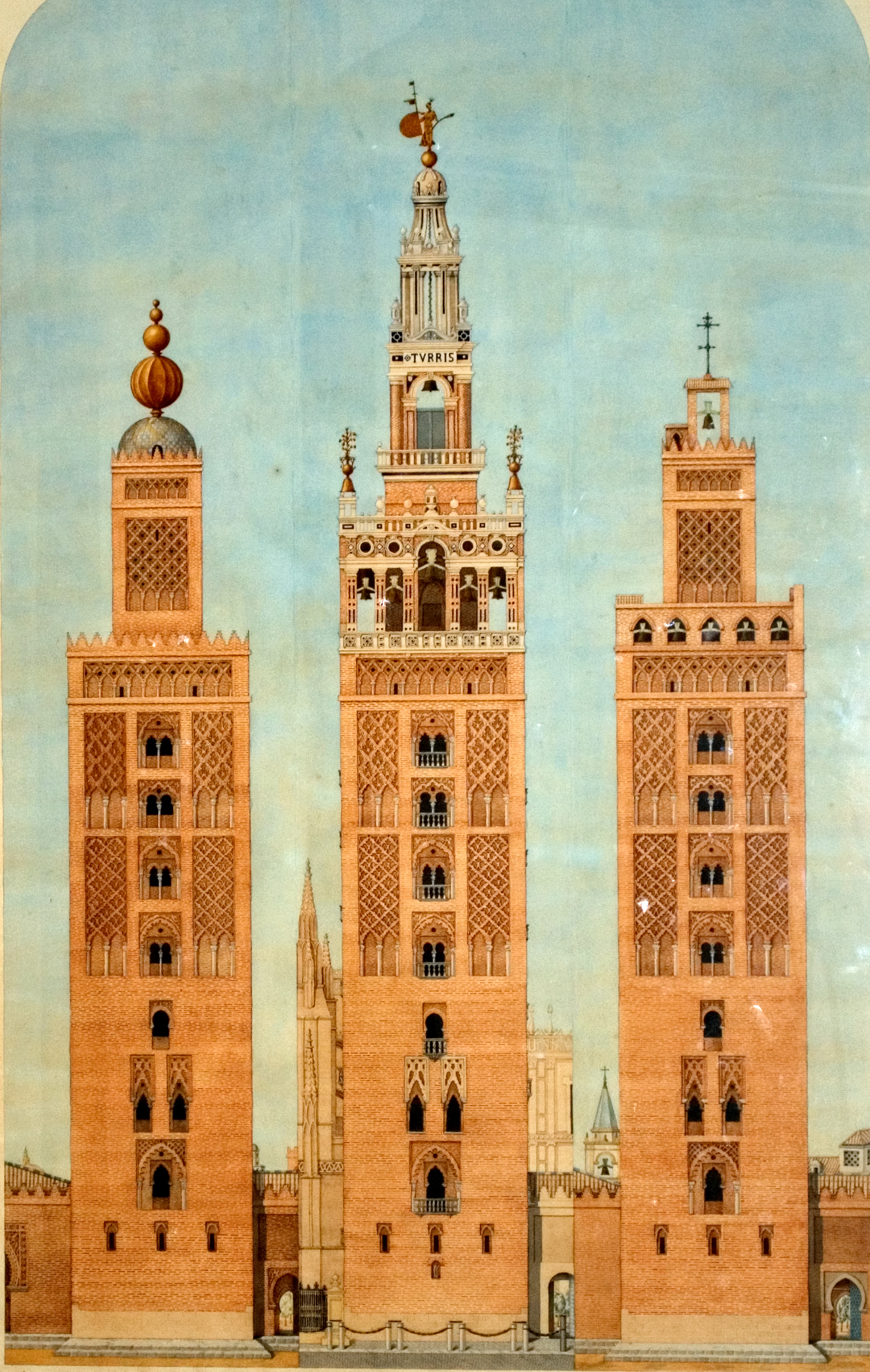
The three historical stages of the Giralda (illustration by Alejandro Guichot y Sierra): on the left is the original Almohad minaret circa 1198, on the right is how it looked as a Christian bell tower circa 1400, and in the middle is its current appearance after 1568.

This structure was badly damaged in a 1356 earthquake, and by 1433 the city began building the current cathedral. Local stone to build with was scarce, and there were few skilled stonemasons in the area, so timber and stone had to be shipped from overseas, and like its earlier incarnation, the construction of the cathedral brought together artisans from all over its respective empire, this time as far away as Germany and the Netherlands. Construction took 73 years and was completed in 1506. Today, the cathedral stands as one of the largest churches in the world and an example of the Gothic and Baroque architectural styles.

=== Additions to the tower ===
When the mosque was converted into a cathedral, the minaret was reused as a bell tower. Its structure remained largely the same during this period. The metal spheres that originally topped the tower fell during the 1356 earthquake, and the spheres were replaced in 1400 with a cross and bell. The first public striking clock in Spain was added here around the same time.

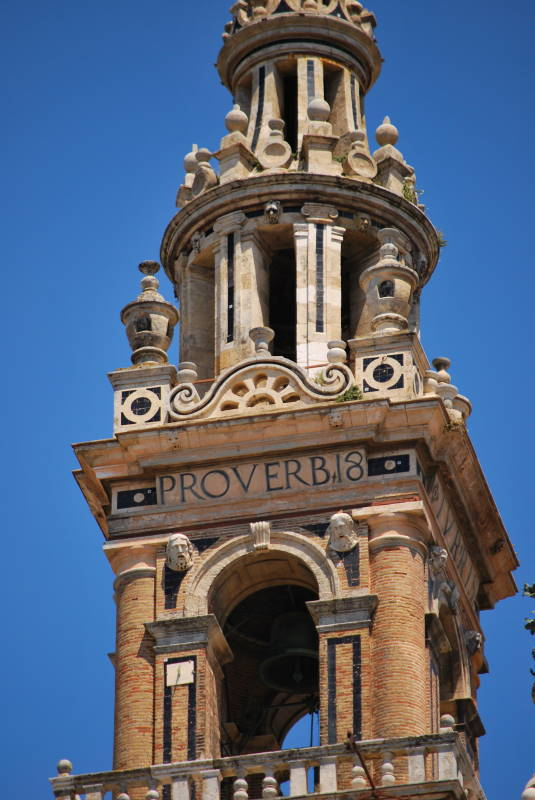
Part of the 16th-century inscription, "Proverbs 18"

In the 16th century Hernán Ruiz the Younger, who was commissioned to work on cathedral, constructed a new Renaissance-style belfry extension at the top of the tower, which houses the bells today. The new belfry was constructed between 1558 and 1568. It brings the height of the tower to approximately 95 or 96 meters. It consists of several sections or tiers. The lower section has a square layout with the same width as the main shaft of the tower. It consists of a lantern-like structure with 5 openings on either side in which the bells are hung. The space above these openings features for oculi in addition to a central arch. The top edge of this section is crowned with decorative stone "urns" popularly known as "carambolas". The upper section is narrower and consists of two square sections topped by two round sections of diminishing size. Black tiles are used alongside sculptural details for decoration throughout the belfry. The top of the square sections also features the inscription "TURRIS FORTISSIMA NOMEN DNI PROBERBI8", a reference to a passage of the 18th Proverb: "The name of the Lord is a fortified tower."

==== The Giraldillo ====
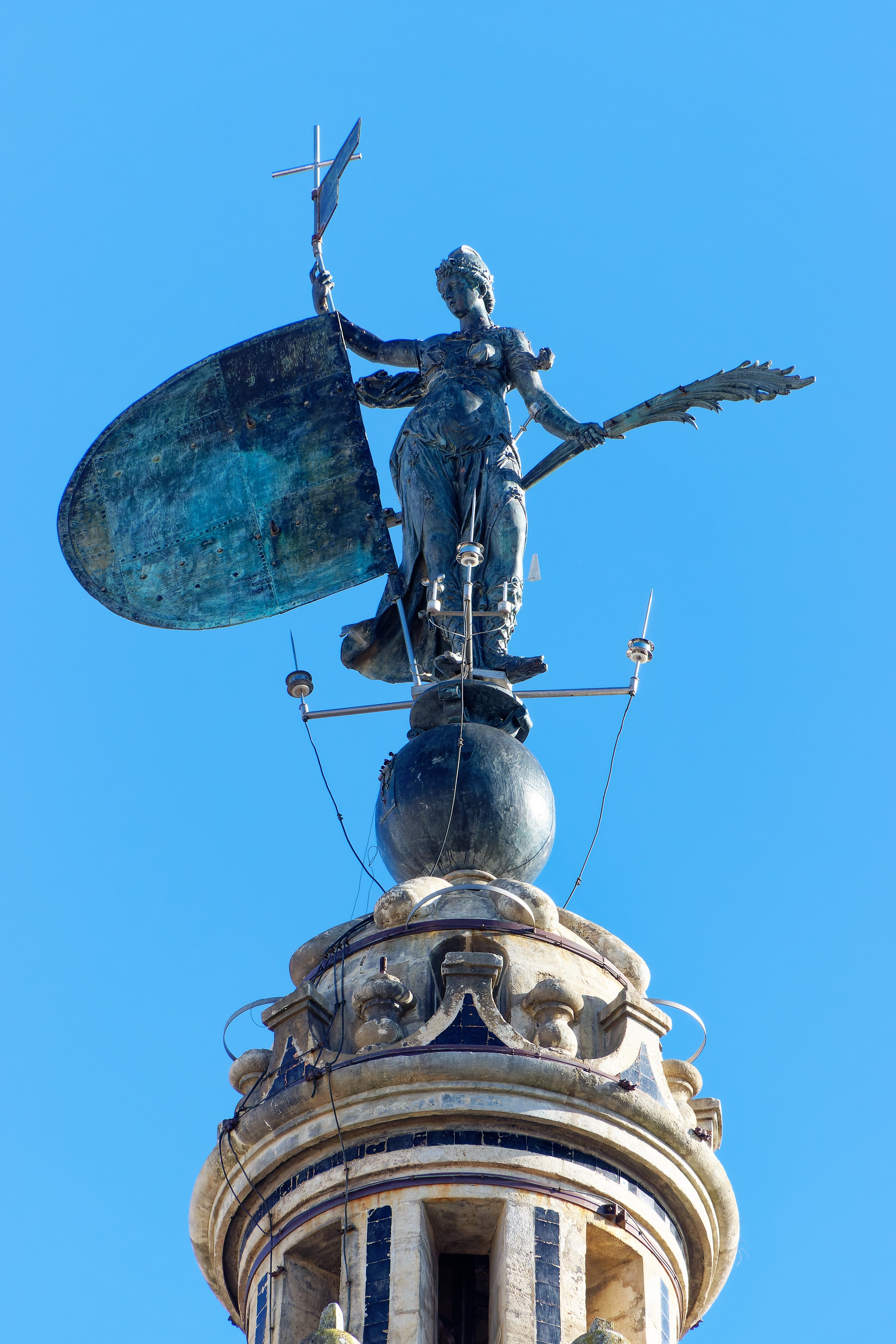
The Giraldillo sculpture at the top of the tower

The finishing touch added to the summit of the belfry in 1568 is the rotating sculpture known as the Giraldillo (weather vane), from which the name "Giralda" is derived. It was designed by Luis de Vargas, a model was made by Juan Bautista Vásquez "el Viejo" and then it was cast in bronze by Bartolomé Morel. The sculpture, in the form of a woman carrying a flag pole, was probably inspired by the image of Pallas Athena, adapting it to a symbol of Christian faith. It is 4 meters tall and approximately 4 meters wide, weighing 1,500 kilograms. As it is made of cast bronze sheets, the interior is mostly empty and it is held together with the help of several vertical and horizontal bars. These internal supports rest on a vertical metal axis which is inserted into the sculpture itself up to around breast height and which is anchored below to the summit of the tower. The sculpture thus rotates around this axis like a weather vane.

The Giraldillo has been damaged and worn over time. Repairs were historically difficult due to its weight and its hard-to-reach location. During the 1755 Lisbon earthquake it suffered damage but repairs were not performed until 1770, when it was completely disassembled and its internal support system replaced. In 1980 and 1981 it was partially repaired again, which allowed modern scholars and scientists to study it directly for the first time. It was determined then that the sculpture was in poor condition and needed further restoration. This process began in 1999, when the Giraldillo was removed and brought to the Andalusian Historical Heritage Institute (Instituto Andaluz de Patrimonio Histórico) for restoration, while a replica was put in its place. The restored sculpture was reinstalled in 2005 along with instrumentation designed to monitor its condition in the future.

== Buildings inspired by the Giralda ==
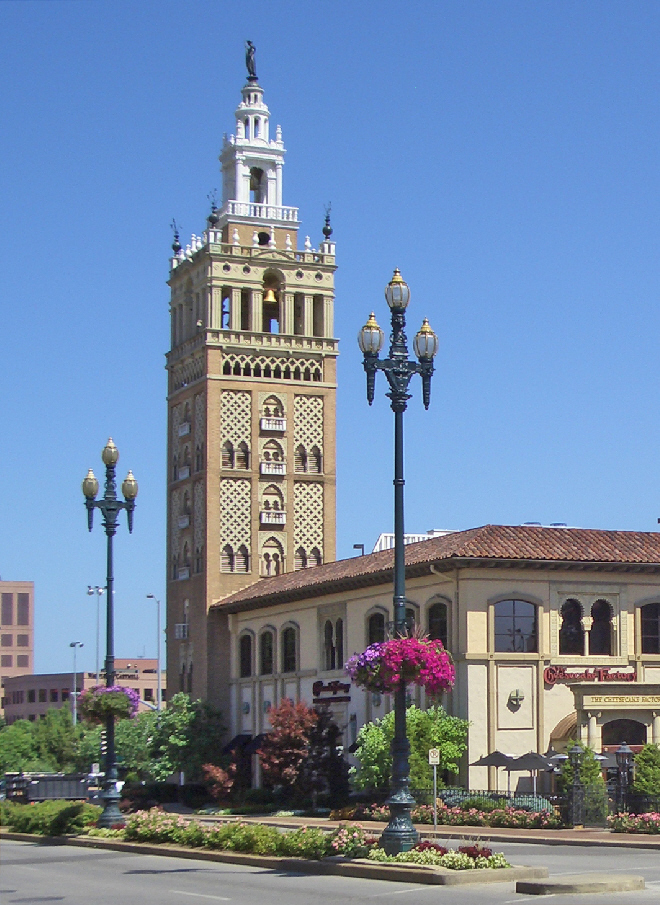
Replica of the Giralda, in Kansas City, Missouri, twinned with Seville.

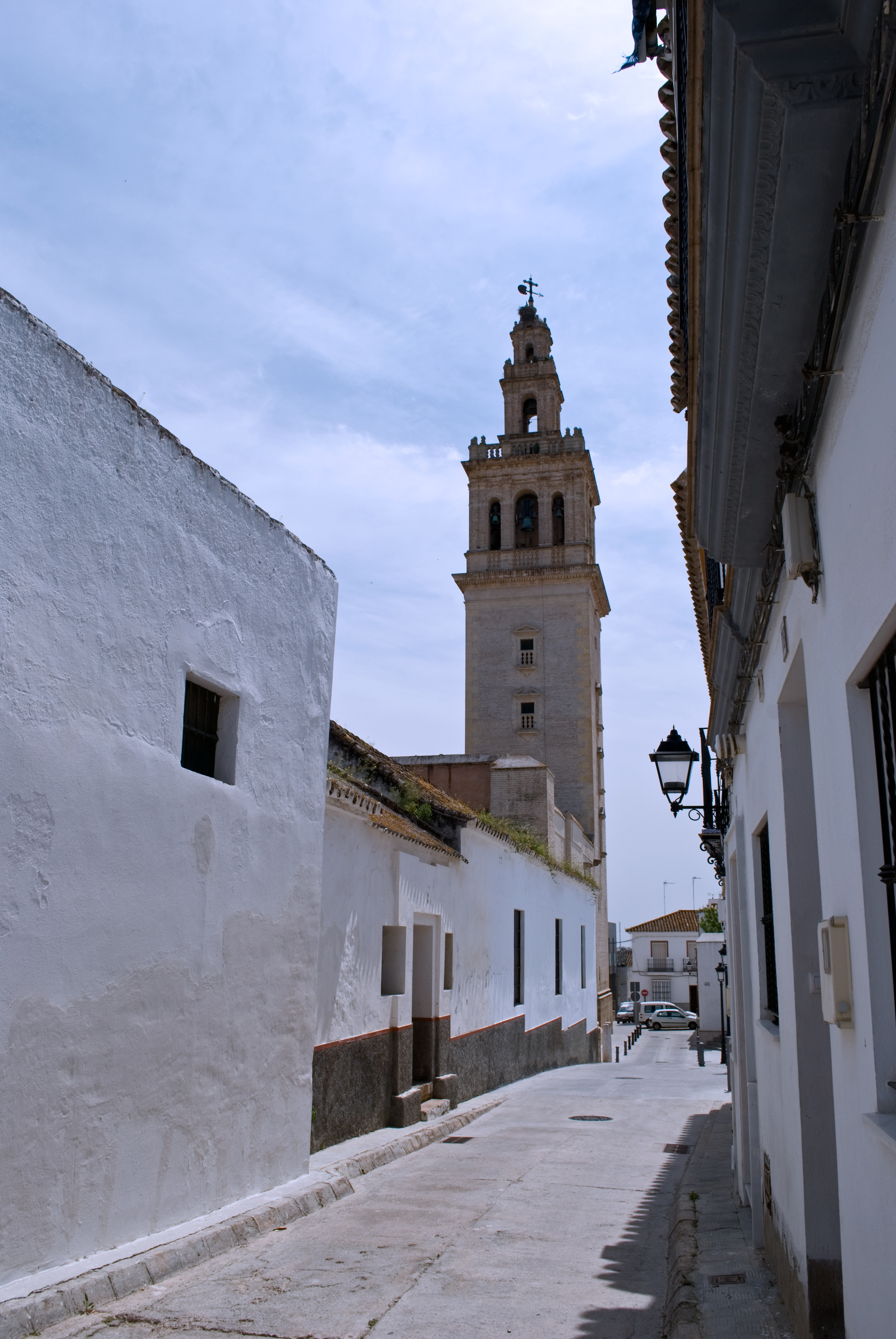
The Giraldilla of Lebrija, built in the late 1400s.

Many towers have borrowed from the Giralda's design throughout history. Several church towers in the province of Seville also bear a resemblance to the tower, and may have been inspired by the Giralda. These towers, most notably those in Lebrija and Carmona, are popularly known as Giraldillas.

Numerous replicas of the Giralda have been built in the United States, mostly between 1890 and 1937:

- The second Madison Square Garden in New York City, designed by Stanford White, built in 1890
- The San Francisco Ferry Building clock tower, completed in 1895
- The clock tower of the Railroad Depot in Minneapolis, destroyed by wind in 1941
- The Freedom Tower in Miami, Florida, built in 1925
- The Biltmore Hotel in Coral Gables, Florida, built in 1926
- The Wrigley Building in Chicago, built in 1920
- The Terminal Tower in Cleveland, built in 1930
- The clock tower at the University of Puerto Rico's Río Piedras campus, built in 1937
- A replica in the Country Club Plaza in Kansas City, Missouri, built in 1967

The building has also inspired buildings outside the US and Spain, such as:

- Seven Sisters, seven Soviet-era skyscrapers in Moscow, Russia
- Palace of Culture and Science in Warsaw, Poland
- Tower of the university's library on the Ladeuzeplein in Leuven, Belgium

== See also ==
- List of tallest structures built before the 20th century
- Justa and Rufina
