= Mayoral elections in Overland Park, Kansas =

Elections are held every four years in the off-year immediately after US presidential election years in Overland Park, Kansas to elect the city's mayor. Elections for city officials in Johnson County are held on the first Tuesday after the first Monday in November. If more than two candidates file to run for office, a primary must be held on the first Tuesday in August.

== 1997 ==
1997 Overland Park, Kansas mayoral election
- April 1, 1997 (general)
- Turnout: 21.01%
| Candidate | Ed Eilert (incumbent) | Max Gordon |
| Party | Republican | Independent |
| Popular vote | 13,277 | 7,279 |
| Percentage | 64.5% | 35.4% |
Mayor before election
Ed Eilert
Republican
Elected mayor
Ed Eilert
Republican

The 1997 Overland Park, Kansas mayoral election was held on April 1, 1997. Incumbent Mayor Ed Eilert ran against Max Gordon and was elected to a fifth term in office.

=== General election ===
==== Candidates ====
- Ed Eilert, incumbent mayor
- Max Gordon

==== Results ====
Overland Park, Kansas mayoral election results, 1997
| Party | Candidate | Votes | % |
|---|---|---|---|
| Republican | Ed Eilert (incumbent) | 13,277 | 64.5% |
| Independent | Max Gordon | 7,279 | 35.4% |
| Nonpartisan | Write-ins | 3 | 0.001% |

== 2001 ==
2001 Overland Park, Kansas mayoral election
- April 3, 2001 (general)
| Candidate | Ed Eilert (incumbent) |
| Party | Republican |
| Popular vote | 11,560 |
| Percentage | 99.3% |
Mayor before election
Ed Eilert
Nonpartisan
Elected mayor
Ed Eilert
Nonpartisan

The 2001 Overland Park, Kansas mayoral election was held on April 3, 2001. Incumbent Mayor Ed Eilert ran unopposed and was elected to his sixth term in office.

=== General election ===
==== Candidates ====
- Ed Eilert, incumbent mayor

==== Results ====
Overland Park, Kansas mayoral election, 2001 results
| Party | Candidate | Votes | % |
|---|---|---|---|
| Republican | Ed Eilert (incumbent) | 11,560 | 99.3% |
| Nonpartisan | Write-ins | 74 | 0.60%% |

== 2005 ==
2005 Overland Park, Kansas mayoral election
- April 5, 2005 (general)
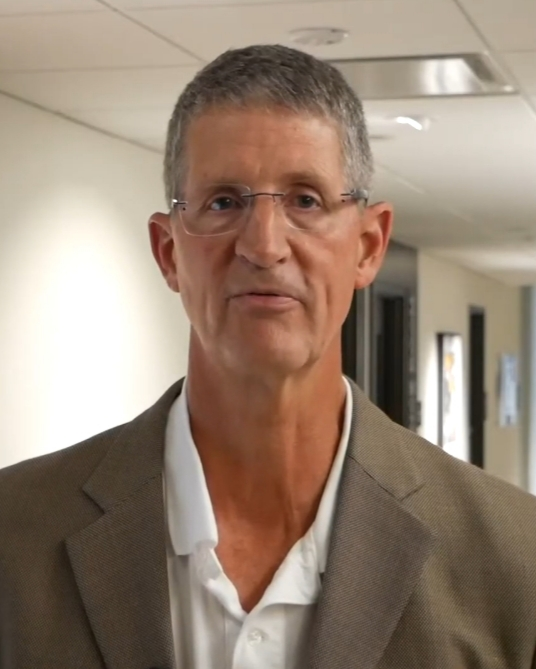
| Candidate | Carl R. Gerlach | Neil S. Sader |
| Party | Nonpartisan | Nonpartisan |
| Popular vote | 20,340 | 12,554 |
| Percentage | 61.77% | 38.12% |
Mayor before election
Ed Eilert
Nonpartisan
Elected mayor
Carl R. Gerlach
Nonpartisan

The 2005 Overland Park, Kansas mayoral election was held on April 5, 2005. Incumbent Mayor Ed Eilert, who had served in the office since 1981, chose not to run for another term. This election saw Overland Park City Council member Carl R. Gerlach elected as mayor, defeating Neil Sader.

=== General election ===
==== Candidates ====
Only two candidates ran for this election, so a primary was not held.

- Carl R. Gerlach, Overland Park City Council member
- Neil S. Sader

==== Results ====
Overland Park, Kansas mayoral election, 2005 results
| Party | Candidate | Votes | % |
|---|---|---|---|
| Nonpartisan | Carl R. Gerlach | 20,340 | 61.77% |
| Nonpartisan | Neil S. Sader | 12,554 | 38.12% |
| Nonpartisan | Write-ins | 35 | 0.11% |

== 2009 ==
2009 Overland Park, Kansas mayoral election
- April 7, 2009 (general)
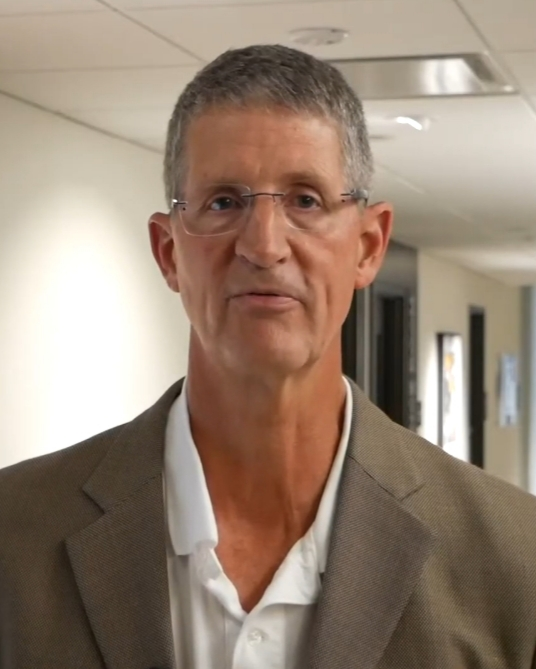
| Candidate | Carl R. Gerlach (incumbent) |
| Party | Nonpartisan |
Mayor before election
Carl R. Gerlach
Nonpartisan
Elected mayor
Carl R. Gerlach
Nonpartisan

The 2009 Overland Park, Kansas mayoral election was held on April 7, 2009. Incumbent Carl R. Gerlach ran unopposed and was elected to a second term in office.

=== General election ===
==== Candidates ====
- Carl R. Gerlach, incumbent mayor

==== Results ====
Overland Park, Kansas mayoral election, 2009 results
| Party | Candidate | Votes | % |
|---|---|---|---|
| Nonpartisan | Carl R. Gerlach (incumbent) | 6,357 | 99.03% |
| Nonpartisan | Write-ins | 62 | 0.97% |

== 2013 ==
2013 Overland Park, Kansas mayoral election
- April 2, 2013 (general)
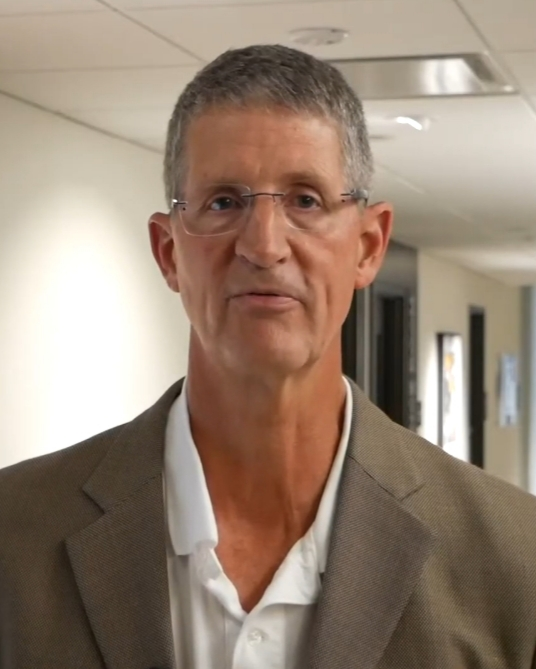
| Candidate | Carl R. Gerlach (incumbent) |
| Party | Nonpartisan |
Mayor before election
Carl R. Gerlach
Nonpartisan
Elected mayor
Carl R. Gerlach
Nonpartisan

The 2013 Overland Park, Kansas mayoral election was held on April 2, 2013. Incumbent Carl R. Gerlach ran unopposed and was elected to a third term in office.

=== General election ===
==== Candidates ====
- Carl R. Gerlach, incumbent mayor

==== Results ====
Overland Park, Kansas mayoral election, 2013 results
| Party | Candidate | Votes | % |
|---|---|---|---|
| Nonpartisan | Carl R. Gerlach (incumbent) | 6,373 | 98.99% |
| Nonpartisan | Write-ins | 65 | 1.01% |

== 2017 ==
2017 Overland Park, Kansas mayoral election
- November 7, 2017 (general)
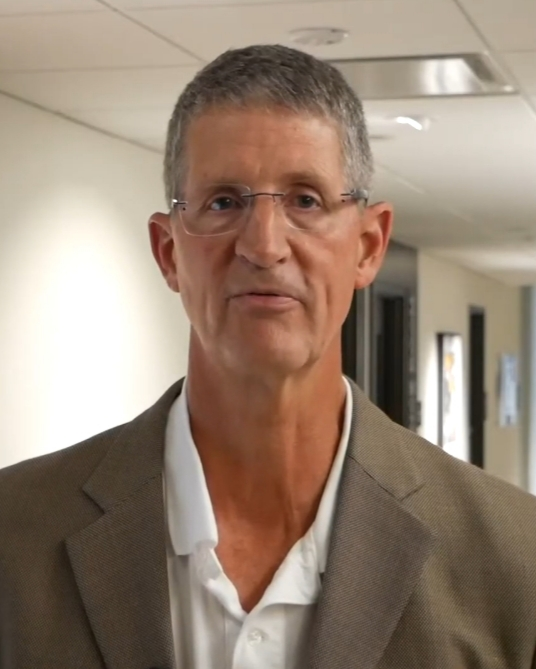
| Candidate | Carl R. Gerlach (incumbent) | Charlotte O’Hara |
| Party | Nonpartisan | Nonpartisan |
| Popular vote | 14,561 | 8,376 |
| Percentage | 63.37% | 36.45% |
Mayor before election
Carl R. Gerlach
Nonpartisan
Elected mayor
Carl R. Gerlach
Nonpartisan

The 2017 Overland Park, Kansas mayoral election was held on November 7, 2017. This election saw the first challenger to incumbent Mayor Carl R. Gerlach since 2005. He ultimately was elected to a fourth term in office.

=== General election ===
==== Candidates ====
- Carl R. Gerlach, incumbent mayor
- Charlotte O'Hara

==== Results ====
Overland Park, Kansas mayoral election, 2017 results
| Party | Candidate | Votes | % |
|---|---|---|---|
| Nonpartisan | Carl R. Gerlach (incumbent) | 14,561 | 63.37% |
| Nonpartisan | Charlotte O’Hara | 8,376 | 36.45% |
| Nonpartisan | Write-ins | 42 | 0.18% |

== 2021 ==
2021 Overland Park, Kansas mayoral election
- August 3, 2021 (primary); November 2, 2021 (general)
| Candidate | Curt Skoog | Mike Czinege |
| Party | Nonpartisan | Nonpartisan |
| Popular vote | 20,243 | 19,530 |
| Percentage | 50.76% | 48.97 |
Mayor before election
Carl R. Gerlach
Nonpartisan
Elected mayor
Curt Skoog
Nonpartisan

The 2021 Overland Park, Kansas mayoral election was an election for the office of mayor of Overland Park, Kansas. Incumbent Carl R. Gerlach did not run for re-election.

Gerlach and another former Overland Park mayor, Ed Eilert, endorsed Curt Skoog.

=== Primary election ===
==== Candidates ====
- Dr. Faris Farassati, Overland Park City Council member
- Mike Czinege, retired AMC Theatres executive
- Clay Norkey
- Curt Skoog, Overland Park City Council member for Ward 2

==== Results ====
Overland Park, Kansas mayoral primary election, 2021 results
| Party | Candidate | Votes | % |
|---|---|---|---|
| Nonpartisan | Mike Czinege | 9,227 | 38.3% |
| Nonpartisan | Curt Skoog | 5,644 | 23.43% |
| Nonpartisan | Dr. Faris Farassati | 5,001 | 20.76% |
| Nonpartisan | Clay Norkey | 4,219 | 17.51% |

=== General election ===
Mike Czinege and Curt Skoog received the most votes in the primary, allowing them to appear on the ballot in the general election on November 2, 2021. Skoog beat Czinege in a tight race, by 731 votes.

==== Candidates ====
- Mike Czinege
- Curt Skoog

==== Results ====
Overland Park, Kansas mayoral primary election, 2021 results
| Party | Candidate | Votes | % |
|---|---|---|---|
| Nonpartisan | Curt Skoog | 20,243 | 50.76% |
| Nonpartisan | Mike Czinege | 19,530 | 48.97% |
| Nonpartisan | Write-Ins | 107 | 0.27% |

== 2025 ==
Curt Skoog was re-elected as mayor of Overland Park in the general election, which was held on November 4, 2025.
