= Shawnee Mission South High School =

Location
- 5800 West 107th Street; Overland Park, Kansas 66207; United States; 38.937176°N 94.653606°W

Information
- School type: Public, High School
- Established: 1966
- School district: Shawnee Mission USD 512
- CEEB code: 172772
- Principal: Todd Dain
- Athletic Director: Mark Mahonney
- Teaching staff: 97.00 (FTE)
- Grades: 9–12
- Gender: Coed
- Enrollment: 1,593 (2023–2024)
- Student to teacher ratio: 16.42
- Campus type: Suburban
- Colors: Green; Gold
- Athletics: Class 6A
- Athletics conference: Sunflower League
- Mascot: Rocky, the Raider
- Team name: Raiders
- Rival: Shawnee Mission East High School
- Newspaper: The Patriot
- Yearbook: Heritage
- Communities served: Shawnee Mission
- Website: smsouth.smsd.org

Shawnee Mission South High School is a high school located in Overland Park, Kansas, United States, serving students in grades 9-12. The school is one of several public high schools located within Shawnee Mission and operated by Shawnee Mission USD 512 school district. The school colors are green and gold and the school mascot is the Raider. The average annual enrollment is approximately 1,600 students. The school newspaper is called The Patriot.

== History ==
Shawnee Mission South High School was established in 1966.

The school's mascot was chosen by the first graduating class of 1967. The Raider was chosen as a mascot because of the popular band Paul Revere & the Raiders.

Throughout its history, Shawnee Mission South has hosted several prominent concerts. The Who played a concert with The Buckinghams at Shawnee Mission South on November 17, 1967. The concert was performed in the gymnasium that currently still stands. The Byrds appeared in concert in the school's gymnasium in March 1969. The Amboy Dukes performed in a "senior class only" concert, in the football stadium, May, 1971. Brewer & Shipley performed in the cafeteria in 1976.

In 1983, Shawnee Mission South was named a Blue Ribbon School, the highest honor an American school can achieve. In 1997, the school was named a Blue Ribbon School for the second time in the school's history.

== Academics ==
Shawnee Mission South High School is a two-time Blue Ribbon School, occurring in 1983 and 1997. Beginning in the 2007–2008 school year, the Shawnee Mission School District adopted a new program, Project Lead the Way, as the district's signature engineering program, offered at Shawnee Mission South High School. The classes for Lead the Way include Introduction to Engineering Design, Principles of Engineering, Digital Electronics, Aerospace Engineering, and Engineering Design and Development. Another program unique to Shawnee Mission South was that of the Center for International Studies. The Center for International Studies (CIS) provided intensive instruction in four languages: Arabic, Chinese, Japanese, and Russian. The program also provided students the opportunity to attend geopolitics classes rather than regular social studies courses. As of now, only Arabic is still taught at Shawnee Mission South, with Chinese being taught at Shawnee Mission East High School, Japanese at Shawnee Mission Northwest High School, and Russian at Shawnee Mission North High School. In 2005, South's Science Olympiad team made district news by winning the state of Kansas competition and advancing to the national level. As of January 22, 2012, the Shawnee Mission South Academic Decathlon team has won the Kansas State Academic Decathlon Competition and advanced to nationals for fifteen years in a row.

== Extracurricular activities ==
The Raiders compete in the Sunflower League and are classified as a 6A school (despite the drop in enrollment), the largest classification in Kansas according to the Kansas State High School Activities Association. Throughout its history, Shawnee Mission South has won several state championships in various sports. Many graduates have gone on to participate in collegiate athletics.

=== State championships ===
State Championships
| Season | Sport | Number of Championships | Year |
|---|---|---|---|
| Fall | Football | 2 | 1973, 1975 |
| Fall | Soccer, Boys | 2 | 1986, 1987 |
| Fall | Volleyball | 2 | 1974, 1993 |
| Fall | Cross Country, Boys | 6 | 1968, 1969, 1972, 1973, 1978, 2011 |
| Fall | Cross Country, Girls | 2 | 1978, 1988 |
| Winter | Swimming and Diving, Boys | 6 | 1972, 1981, 1982, 1984, 1989, 2013 |
| Winter | Swimming and Diving, Girls | 1 | 1976 |
| Winter | Gymnastics, Boys | 3 | 1975, 1976, 1977 |
| Winter | Basketball, Boys | 2 | 1990, 2013 |
| Winter | Indoor Track, Boys | 3 | 1975, 1976, 1978 |
| Winter | Basketball, Girls | 3 | 1995, 2024, 2026 |
| Spring | Golf, Boys | 5 | 1968, 1969, 1970, 1973, 1999 |
| Spring | Track & Field, Boys | 6 | 1975, 1977, 1978, 1979, 1980, 2008 |
| Spring | Baseball | 4 | 1975, 1979, 1981, 1985 |
| Spring | Tennis, Boys | 7 | 1968, 1972, 1973, 1975, 1986, 1987, 2000 |
| Spring | Tennis, Girls | 8 | 1972, 1974, 1975, 1976, 1977, 1978, 1979, 1996 |
| Total | | 60 | |

== Non-athletic Programs ==
=== Debate ===
Two debaters, Brooklyn Hato and Mary "Clare" Bradley won the NCFL National Championship in 2022 and repeated as national champions When Madison Augustine and Jeremiah Rimpsom won in 2023. The debate team, once again Brooklyn and Clare also won the 2023 National Speech & Debate Tournament

== Notable alumni ==
- Ethan Corson — member of the Kansas Senate representing the 7th district; director of Kansas Democratic Party; senior advisor to U.S. Secretary of Commerce Penny Pritzker; and chief of staff of the International Trade Administration
- David Dastmalchian — actor
- Stephen Dolginoff — writer, composer
- Carl R. Gerlach — mayor of Overland Park, Kansas from 2005–2021
- Richard Gilliland — actor
- Gina Grad —voice actor, radio and podcast personality
- Neal Jeffrey — former Baylor and NFL quarterback
- Tom Kane — voice actor
- Steve Little — NFL football kicker and punter
- Mike Morin — MLB baseball player
- Rodney Peete — former USC and NFL quarterback; sports television broadcaster
- Rob Riggle — actor, comedian
- Vince Snowbarger — lawyer and politician
- Peter Spears — Academy Award-winning filmmaker and actor
- Carla Sunberg — president of Nazarene Theological Seminary, 1979
- Bobby Voelker — professional mixed martial artist, current UFC Welterweight
- Ge Wang — professor at Stanford University, author, entrepreneur

== See also ==
- List of high schools in Kansas
- List of unified school districts in Kansas

Other high schools in Shawnee Mission USD 512 school district

- Shawnee Mission East High School in Prairie Village
- Shawnee Mission North High School in Overland Park
- Shawnee Mission Northwest High School in Shawnee
- Shawnee Mission West High School in Overland Park
