= Shawnee Mission West High School =

Location
- 8800 West 85th Street; Overland Park, Kansas 66212; United States; 38.975804°N 94.688195°W

Information
- School type: Public, High School
- Established: 1962
- School district: Shawnee Mission USD 512
- CEEB code: 172773
- Principal: Blake Revelle
- Athletic Director: Todd McAtee
- Teaching staff: 98.00 (on an FTE basis)
- Grades: 9–12
- Gender: coed
- Enrollment: 1,618 (2023-2024)
- Student to teacher ratio: 16.51
- Schedule: Block scheduling
- Campus type: Suburban
- Colors: Black; Gold
- Athletics: Class 6A; East District
- Athletics conference: Sunflower League
- Nickname: Vikings
- Rival: Shawnee Mission East High School
- Accreditation: Blue Ribbon 1983
- Newspaper: The EPIC
- Yearbook: The SAGA
- Website: smwest.smsd.org

Shawnee Mission West High School is a fully accredited public high school located in Overland Park, Kansas, United States, serving students in grades 9-12. Shawnee Mission West is one of several public high schools located within Overland Park and operated by Shawnee Mission USD 512 school district. The official school colors are black and gold and the school mascot is the Viking.

Shawnee Mission West is a member of the Kansas State High School Activities Association and offers a variety of sports programs. Athletic teams compete in the 6A division and are known as the "Vikings". Extracurricular activities are also offered in the form of performing arts, school publications, and clubs.

== History ==
Shawnee Mission West was established in 1962 due to the increasing numbers of students from the Overland Park, Kansas area. Prior to its creation, the Shawnee Mission School District included Shawnee Mission North High School (the original Shawnee Mission High School) and Shawnee Mission East High School. Students from North and East were given the opportunity to transfer to the new high school if they lived within the boundaries of the new high school. Since then, it has been remodeled several times. Additions have also been made to the school, the most famous of which is "the bridge," an actual bridge between halves of the school that later had classrooms added beneath it. The bridge now serves as a social and dining area for the students.

== Academics ==
The school was identified as a Blue Ribbon School in 1983. The Blue Ribbon Award recognizes public and private schools which perform at high levels or have made significant academic improvements. The former principal, Karl Krawitz, was named the NEA III District Educator of the Year for 2004–2005. Shawnee Mission West is home to both an award-winning school newspaper, the EPIC, and yearbook, SAGA.

== Student demographics ==
Shawnee Mission West's student body population is 16% African-American, which is the highest percentage of African-American students at any Johnson County high school. Statistically, Shawnee Mission West is also the most ethnically diverse high school in the county, as 43% of its students are non-Caucasian. Shawnee Mission West draws its student population from both Overland Park, Lenexa, and from a small portion of Shawnee.

== Extracurricular activities ==
The Vikings compete in the Sunflower League and are classified as a 6A school, the largest classification in Kansas according to the Kansas State High School Activities Association. Throughout its history, Shawnee Mission West has won several state championships in various sports. Many graduates have gone on to participate in Division I, Division II, and Division III athletics.

=== Athletics ===
==== Football ====
Shawnee Mission West's football program has appeared in eight state championship games, winning in 1972, 1985 and 2012, and losing in 1971, 1973, 1976, 1983 and 2006. Notable coaches include two Greater Kansas City Football Coaches Association Hall of Famers in Dick Purdy (1967-1980), and Harold Wambsgans (1981-1990).

===== Football state championship appearances and results =====
State Championship Appearances
Year	Class	Winning team	Losing team	Score
1971	5A	Shawnee Mission North	Shawnee Mission West	9-6
1972	5A	Shawnee Mission West	Wichita Southeast	7-6
1973	5A	Shawnee Mission South	Shawnee Mission West	23-0
1976	5A	Wichita Southeast	Shawnee Mission West	17-6
1983	6A	Wichita East	Shawnee Mission West	20-8
1985	6A	Shawnee Mission West	Dodge City	24-0
2006	6A	Hutchinson	Shawnee Mission West	21-14
2012	6A	Shawnee Mission West	Hutchinson	19-14

==== Boys' basketball ====
The boys' basketball program has made state championship game appearances in 1987, 1992, 1999 and 2005, however they have never won a state title.

==== Girls' soccer ====
The Viking girls' soccer program has made four state championship appearances since 2005, capturing a state title in 2016, and finishing as runner-up in 2005, 2006, and 2011.

==== Tennis ====
In recent years, the girls' tennis team has taken the region by storm. In 2006, the girls' won the Sunflower League, which had been largely dominated by Shawnee Mission East for the past eight years. In both 2006 and 2007, the team turned out a state doubles runner-up title. In 2014, the team got 2nd place at the Sunflower League tournament Katherine and Josephine Cao won the doubles State Championship.

==== Other sports ====
West has competed in four state title games for basketball, the most recent being in 2005, but has never won a championship. The Shawnee Mission West baseball team also has enjoyed their fair share of success, winning state championships in 1977, 1987, and 1988. In 1991, West's soccer team won the 6A state title, defeating two USA Today nationally ranked teams in the process: (Wichita South High School and Shawnee Mission South). Also, the Shawnee Mission West girls' soccer team was 2005 and 2006 Sunflower League champions; 2005 and 2006 Northeast Kansas 6A regional champions; 2005 and 2006 Kansas 6A state quarter-finalist; 2005 and 2006 Kansas 6A state runners-up. In 2016 the girls' soccer team won the Kansas 6A state championship, the Olathe Northwest Invitational Tournament, and the Sunflower League; ending the season with 20 wins, 0 losses, and 1 tie. The girls' soccer team ended the season nationally ranked; sixth by Top Drawer Soccer and ninth by the NSCAA. This was the first state championship for the school in girls' soccer.

=== State championships ===
State Championships
Season	Sport	Number of Championships	Year
Fall	Football	3	1972, 1985, 2012
Fall	Soccer, Boys'	1	1991
Fall	Gymnastics, Girls'	3	1983, 1984, 1987
Winter	Wrestling	2	1974, 1977
Winter	Basketball, Girls'	2	1990, 1993
Winter	Swimming and Diving, Girls'	1	1984
Spring	Baseball	3	1977, 1987, 1988
Spring	Soccer, Girls'	1	2016
Total		16	

=== Music department ===
The Shawnee Mission West marching band has been invited to play in London for the New Years Parade every three years for the past 30+ years. They hold the record for most appearances by a marching band (10) from the United States of America. The Wind Ensemble was selected through audition to perform at the Kansas Music Educators Convention in February 2012. There were only three high school bands selected from across the state of Kansas for the prestigious honor. It has been 15 years since a band from Shawnee Mission West High School has been selected to perform at this event.

At the end of the regular football season, the Shawnee Mission West marching band has a glow show where the band straps glow-sticks to themselves. This show is performed each year at the end of the last home football game of the regular season.

The Choral Department comprises five choirs: Treble Singer's (Women's Beginner choir), Black and Gold Singer's (Beginner Men's choir), Bella Voce (Women's Intermediate choir), Chorale (Selected Mixed choir) and the Madrigal Singers (a chamber choir of 24 to 30 students). Madrigals members are generally required to be enrolled in Chorale, with few exceptions. The Madrigal Singers, the school's premiere vocal ensemble, was selected to represent West at Carnegie Hall in the 2006–07 school year and the Chorale was also in 2009–2010.

== Notable alumni ==
- Bob Anderson, founder of Runner's World
- Jerry Bell, former professional football player, Tampa Bay Buccaneers
- Henri Childs, former professional football player in the Canadian Football League
- Aaron Coleman, politician, in Kansas House of Representatives.
- Roy Foster, former professional football player, San Francisco 49ers, Miami Dolphins
- Matt Freije, former professional basketball player, New Orleans Hornets and Atlanta Hawks
- Jay Jeffrey, former college football and baseball player and coach
- John Lehr, actor, star of the TV show 10 Items or Less
- Rob Neyer, author and ESPN.com baseball columnist
- Ande Parks, comic book artist/writer
- Paul Rudd, actor who is known for his role as Ant-Man in the MCU
- Sally Stonecipher, first female United States Army helicopter pilot
- Jason Sudeikis, actor and former member of Saturday Night Live
- Steve Towle, former professional football player, Miami Dolphins
- Jason Wiles, actor/director

== See also ==
- List of high schools in Kansas
- List of unified school districts in Kansas

=== Other high schools in Shawnee Mission USD 512 school district ===
- Shawnee Mission East High School in Prairie Village
- Shawnee Mission North High School in Overland Park
- Shawnee Mission Northwest High School in Shawnee
- Shawnee Mission South High School in Overland Park
- Horizons High School in Mission, Kansas
