= Shawnee Mission North High School =

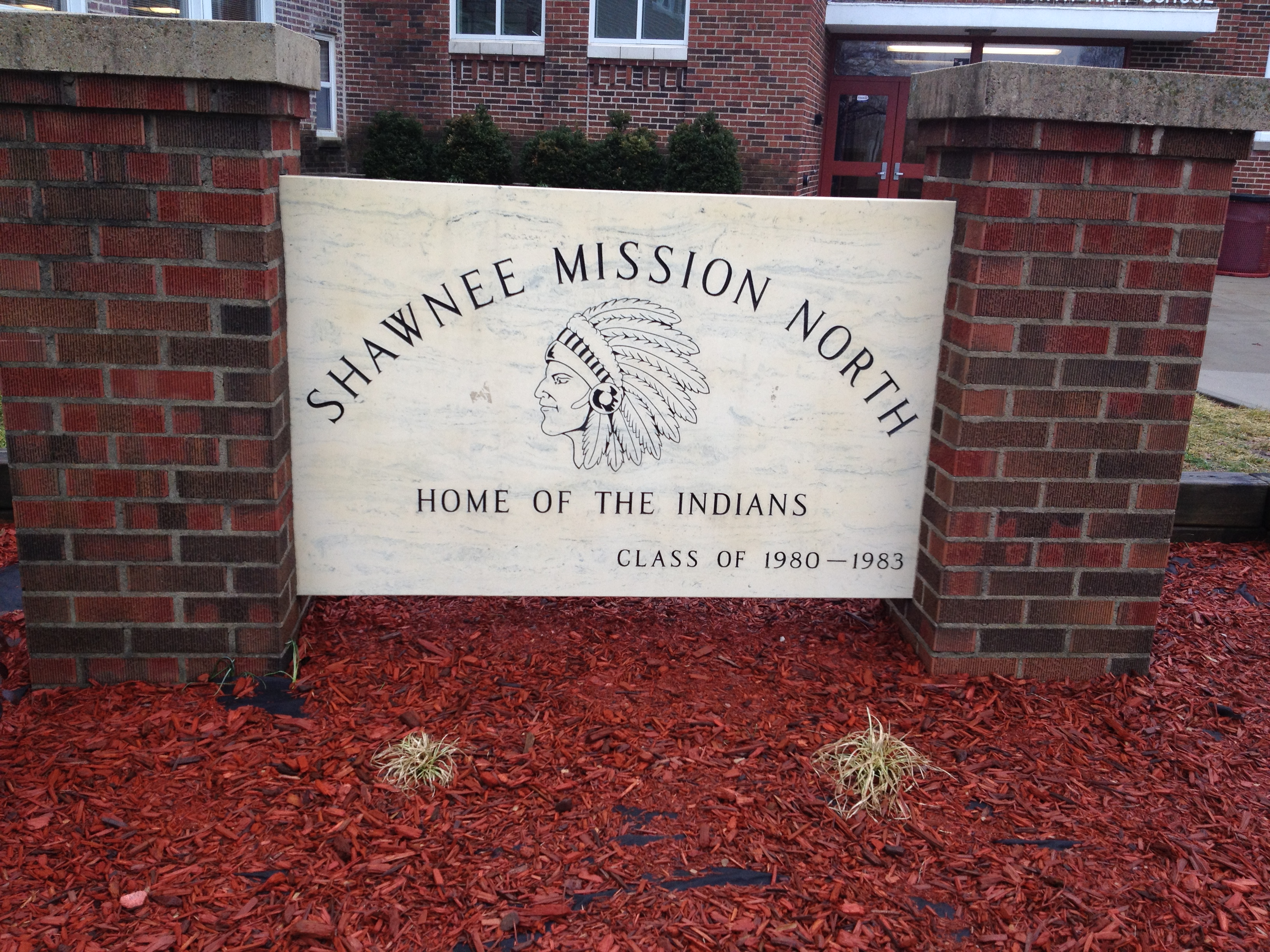
- Sign, 2012

Location
- 7401 Johnson Drive; Overland Park, Kansas 66202; United States; 39.021358°N 94.67113°W

Information
- School type: Public, High School
- Established: 1922
- School district: Shawnee Mission USD 512
- CEEB code: 172000
- Principal: David Ewers
- Athletic Director: Annette Gonzales
- Teaching staff: 106.10 (FTE)
- Grades: 9–12
- Gender: coed
- Enrollment: 1,506 (2023–2024)
- Student to teacher ratio: 14.19
- Campus type: Suburban
- Colors: Cardinal; White; Black
- Athletics: Class 6A; District 2
- Athletics conference: Sunflower League
- Mascot: Bison
- Rival: Shawnee Mission West High School Shawnee Mission East High School
- Website: smnorth.smsd.org

Shawnee Mission North High School is a public secondary school in Overland Park, Kansas, United States, for grades 9–12. It is one of five high schools operated by Shawnee Mission USD 512 school district.

The school colors are Cardinal red, Black and White and the school mascot is the Bison. The average annual enrollment is approximately 2,000 students.

Shawnee Mission North High School was founded in 1922 in order to help educate the increasing number of students due to the emerging population of Shawnee Mission. Throughout the years, several expansions and add-ons were constructed to the school. In 1950, a large addition was added, finally connecting all of the buildings through hallways. A swimming pool and science wing were constructed in 1969 which connected to the south academic wing. A new library was added in the summer of 1997. In 2007, the school added a new auxiliary gym, new tennis courts, pool and auditorium remodeling, two new Biology classrooms, and expansion of the band and choir department.

Shawnee Mission North is a member of the Kansas State High School Activities Association and offers a variety of sports programs. Athletic teams compete in the 6A division and are known as the Bison. Extracurricular activities are also offered in the form of performing arts, school publications, and clubs.

== History ==
Shawnee Mission Rural High School opened September 12, 1922, having cost $950,000 to build. It had 12 faculty members and a senior class of 1,200. There had been a vote on September 21, 1921, on a "proposal to organize a rural high school district." In 1922 the east building was completed and in 1936 the west building, housing a gym and auditorium, was connected to the east building. In 1941 the shop wing was constructed to house agriculture and auto mechanics; it was connected to the west building by a concrete walk.

The school remained Shawnee Mission Rural until 1948, when senior Robert F. Bennett was sent to Topeka to petition the legislature for a name change to more accurately reflect the school's suburban status. In 1950 a large addition was made, including the south academic wing, the cross hall/offices, library, Field House and music rooms. After 30 years all the buildings were connected by hallways. Later elected Governor of Kansas, Bennett was named North's first 'Distinguished Alumnus' by the class of 1975. It was thus named Shawnee Mission High School until 1958, when Shawnee Mission East opened and Shawnee Mission High School became Shawnee Mission North. The student body of Shawnee Mission High had petitioned the school board to name the new school anything other than "Shawnee Mission East" in an attempt to avoid a renaming of their school. Shawnee Mission West opened in 1962, Shawnee Mission South in 1966, and Shawnee Mission Northwest in 1969. A swimming pool and science wing were built in 1969, a developmental center in 1978, the Little Theater in 1984, and the "lunch dock" was remodeled in 1993. In the summer of 1997, a new library was added as well as air-conditioning. In 1998, the cafeteria and kitchen were remodeled. A key project at Shawnee Mission North was the demolition of the original stadium and reconstruction which began in 2005, was a rush to have it ready for the Class of 2006 Graduation. Because of the rush, the turf was not properly placed. So they redid it that summer of 2006 so it was ready for the Fall'06. Followed, in 2007, by the addition of a new auxiliary gym, fresh tennis courts, pool and auditorium remodeling, the additions of two Biology rooms, and a significant enlargement of the band and choir department.

The Ozark Mountain Daredevils played a concert at Shawnee Mission North on February 21, 1973, prior to the release of their first album in December of that year.

=== Mascot controversy ===
After a banner for Shawnee Mission North was removed from the Lawrence High School gym at the request of the LHS Inter-Tribal Club in 2017, the Shawnee Mission school district responded that the school has had the permission of the Eastern Shawnee Tribe of Oklahoma since 1992 and had no plans to review the use of their mascot. Upon being told about the LHS action, the current Chief of the Eastern Shawnee Tribe stated that she appreciates that Shawnee Mission North showed respect in 1992, however the use of images of Plains Indians rather than Woodland Indians is inaccurate and the use of the "tomahawk chop" by fans at games is inappropriate. The Eastern Shawnee Tribe of Oklahoma's business council on March 10, 2017 approved a resolution formally rescinding the permission granted in 1992 for the use of the Indian as a mascot. The school district superintendent responded that there would be conversations concerning the mascot. In 2020, there was a renewed push to replace the mascot before the school's centennial in 2022. The Shawnee Mission USD 512 voted unanimously in January 2021 in favor of a policy that school mascots be culturally and racially sensitive and appropriate. In addition to Shawnee Mission North, three elementary schools will change their mascots.

In May 2021, it was announced the mascot would change from Indians to Bison by fall 2021.

== Campus ==
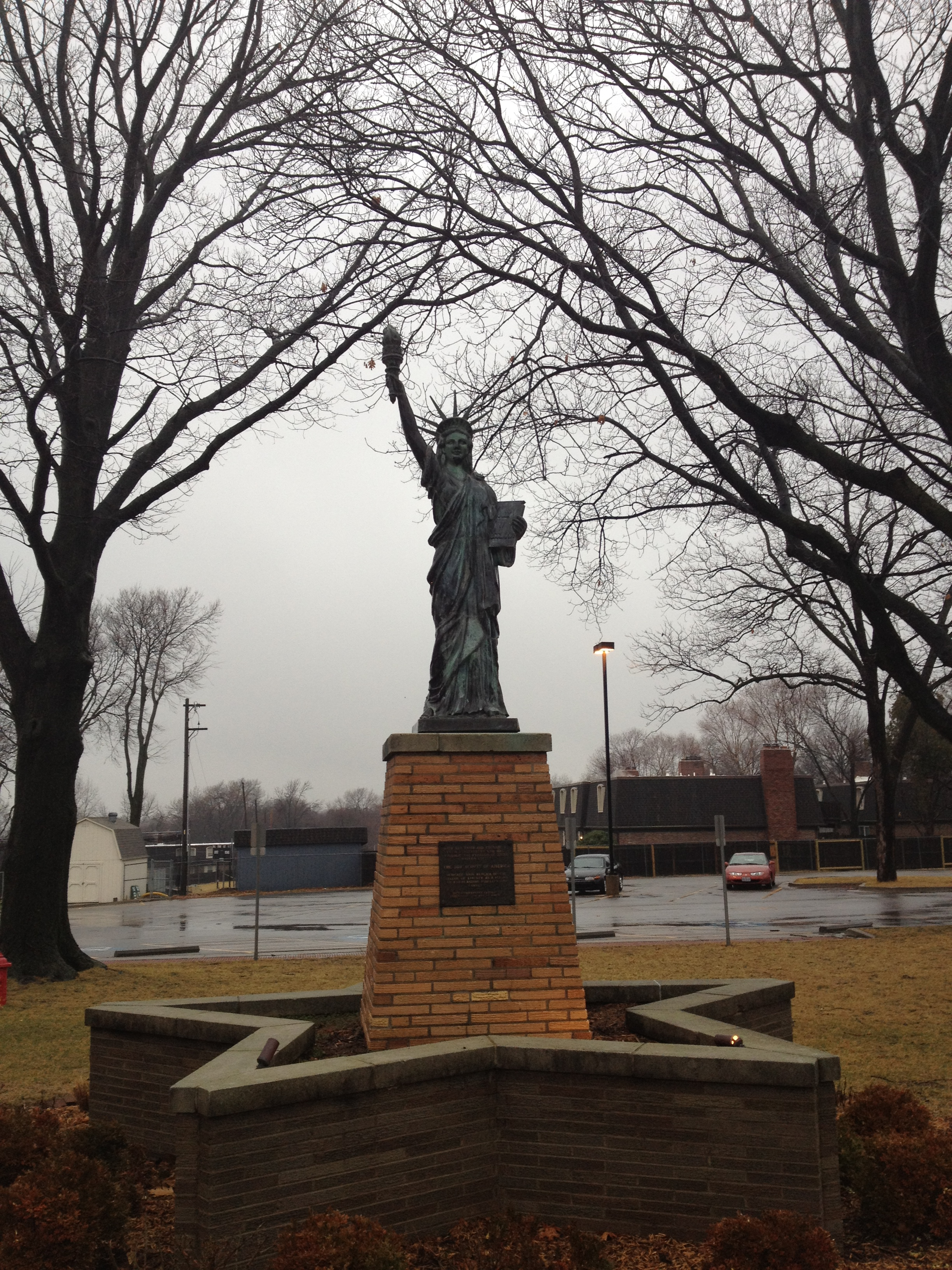
Replica of the Statue of Liberty on the north side of campus, 2012.

=== Liberty statue ===
See Strengthen the Arm of Liberty Monument (Overland Park, Kansas)

The high school grounds play host to one of the many replicas of the Statue of Liberty as a result of the Strengthen the Arm of Liberty campaign by the Boy Scouts of America.

=== Other monuments ===
The campus contains other monuments and points of interest, many which were donated or funded by various graduating classes from the school. Some such items include the entry sign (pictured) and stone benches.

== Extracurricular activities ==
=== Theater ===
In 2011, Shawnee Mission North's theater department won four awards and was given the honor of being named the top high school drama department in the Midwest by Stage Directions magazine.

In 2011, Shawnee Mission North's production of Hairspray was nominated for several awards by Blue Star Awards, including one for Outstanding Overall Production of 2010–2011.

In 2012, Shawnee Mission North's production of Little Shop of Horrors was again nominated by the Blue Star Awards for Outstanding Overall Production of 2011–2012.

In 2013, Shawnee Mission North's production of The 25th Annual Putnam County Spelling Bee was nominated by the Blue Star for a third year in a row for Outstanding Overall Production of 2012–2013.

=== Journalism ===
SM North puts out three publications, a magazine known as "The Mission", an art & literary magazine called "Indian Lore", and a student-created yearbook known as "Indian". Indian has won numerous publishing awards, including national competitions.

=== Marching band ===
In 1958, the Shawnee Mission North "Marching Indians" were nationally televised as they marched in the Tournament of Roses Parade in Pasadena, California. In 2013, the band held its first ever Shawnee Mission North Marching Invitational, which has continued every year since.

=== Athletics ===
The Bison compete in the Sunflower League and are classified as a 6A school, the largest classification in Kansas according to the KSHSAA. Throughout its history, Shawnee Mission North has won many state championships in various sports. Many graduates have gone on to participate in Division I, Division II, and Division III athletics. In 2016, the boys basketball team won the first state basketball title in SM North history.

=== State championships ===
State Championships
| Season | Sport | Number of Championships | Year |
|---|---|---|---|
| Fall | Football | 6 | 1965, 1967, 1969, 1970, 1971, 1974, |
| Fall | Cross Country, Boys | 3 | 1961, 1974, 1975 |
| Fall | Cross Country, Girls | 1 | 2017 |
| Fall | Volleyball | 3 | 1972, 1973, 2002 |
| Fall | Gymnastics, Girls | 2 | 1976, 1978 |
| Spring | Baseball | 1 | 1982 |
| Spring | Golf, Boys | 4 | 1941, 1953, 1954, 1955 |
| Spring | Softball | 5 | 1978, 1981, 1983, 1991, 1992 |
| Spring | Tennis, Girls | 1 | 1971 |
| Total | | 25 | |

=== Traditions ===
The school colors are Cardinal Red and Black, and sometimes white. The mascot at sports events was two Native Americans, one a Princess, and one a Warrior, and was portrayed by one male senior and one female senior student. However, this practice was stopped after the school came under scrutiny for cultural appropriation. The mascot was changed to Bison, and now a senior portrays the Bison, regardless of gender.

During the alma mater, students stand and hold up their right index fingers while singing. The Indian head time capsule (in front of the main office), which was gifted to the school by the class of 1965, is roped off and not to be stepped on. The week of homecoming, Shawnee Mission North stages a large parade. Different clubs, groups, and alumni create floats to parade down Johnson Drive.

SM North is located in northern Overland Park and serves much of northeastern Johnson County. The SM North area has a population of approximately 52,000. It includes the communities of Merriam, Mission, northern Overland Park, Roeland Park, Countryside and Eastern Shawnee.

Every year around February, a senior male is selected as "Northman" by his classmates. This title is much like "Homecoming King" at other schools. Originally called "Big Man on Campus", the winner was crowned at the annual "Women Pay All (WPA)" dance. In 1979 the title was considered outdated and changed to Northman. North has won 5 state championships in football (1969, 1970, 1971, 1974) under the coaching of Larry Taylor. Recently, North's NJROTC program has ranked first nationally in the Drill (in 2007, 2009 and 2010) and in the Armed Regulation (2008) divisions.

== Notable alumni ==
- Mitch Barnhart, Athletics director, University of Kentucky
- Robert Bennett, 39th Governor of Kansas, 1975–1979
- Diane Brewster, actress in television, played roles in The Fugitive, Maverick, and Leave It to Beaver
- Darren Bousman (1997), American film director, mostly several films in the Saw film series
- Nathan Darrow, actor in television series House of Cards
- Ron Elving (1967), Senior Editor and Correspondent on the Washington Desk for NPR News
- Samantha Fish (2007), blues musician
- Chris Golub (1973), NFL football player
- Randy Hendricks (1963), attorney and sports agent
- Edward Hubbard (1957), Colonel in USAF, and motivational speaker
- Jane Hull, 20th Governor of Arizona
- Skip James, former professional baseball player
- Dave Jorgenson, journalist at The Washington Post, TikToker
- Phil McGraw (1968), commonly known as "Dr. Phil", television psychologist and host
- Michael McShane, actor
- Richard Myers (1960), four-star general in the United States Air Force and 15th Chairman of the Joint Chiefs of Staff
- Steve Physioc, former play-by-play announcer for Kansas City Royals
- Michaele Vollbracht (1965), fashion designer and illustrator
- Marcus Weathers, basketball player who plays professionally in Poland

== See also ==
- List of high schools in Kansas
- List of unified school districts in Kansas

Other high schools in Shawnee Mission USD 512 school district

- Shawnee Mission East High School in Prairie Village
- Shawnee Mission Northwest High School in Shawnee
- Shawnee Mission South High School in Overland Park
- Shawnee Mission West High School in Overland Park
