= Shawnee Mission Northwest High School =

Location
- 12701 West 67th Street; Shawnee, Kansas 66216; United States; 39.006637°N 94.732846°W

Information
- School type: Public, High School
- Established: 1969
- School district: Shawnee Mission USD 512
- CEEB code: 172771
- Principal: Lisa Gruman
- Teaching staff: 97.30 (on an FTE basis)
- Grades: 9–12
- Gender: coed
- Enrollment: 1,619 (2023-2024)
- Student to teacher ratio: 16.64
- Campus type: Suburban
- Colors: Orange; Black; White
- Athletics: Class 6A; District 2
- Athletics conference: Sunflower
- Nickname: Cougars
- Rival: Shawnee Mission North High School Shawnee Mission East High School
- Newspaper: The Northwest Passage
- Yearbook: The Lair
- Communities served: Shawnee Mission
- Website: smnorthwest.smsd.org

Shawnee Mission Northwest High School is a fully accredited public high school located in Shawnee, Kansas, United States, serving students in grades 9-12. It is one of five high schools operated by Shawnee Mission USD 512 school district. The school colors are orange, black, and white. The school population is approximately 1,850 students. The current principal is Lisa Gruman.

Shawnee Mission Northwest was founded in 1969 in order to help educate the increasing number of students due to the emerging population of Shawnee Mission. The school launched the International Baccalaureate program at the start of the 2008–2009 school year. Shawnee Mission Northwest is a member of the Kansas State High School Activities Association and offers a variety of sports programs. Athletic teams compete in the 6A division and are known as the "Cougars".

== History ==
Shawnee Mission Northwest High School was established in 1969 to help educate the increasing populations of Shawnee and Overland Park, Kansas. In 1998, a mural of evolution was painted near the science rooms in the school which created controversy throughout the school and the city. The mural depicted many things including DNA, cells, photosynthesis, and a four chambered heart. In addition to this, the mural also depicted in a series of walking figures, the evolution of man, from a hunched-over, hairy, apelike creature to the modern man. The mural offended many students and their parents and a large debate was held concerning whether to paint over the mural. As of 2025, the mural has been repainted by the school’s Murals Club

== Academics ==
Shawnee Mission Northwest High School was designated a Blue Ribbon School in 2001.

In 2001, Shawnee Mission Northwest High School was selected as a Blue Ribbon School. The Blue Ribbon Award recognizes public and private schools which perform at high levels or have made significant academic improvements. In 2008, Shawnee Mission Northwest launched the International Baccalaureate program for the 2008–2009 school year.

=== Faculty ===
In 2004, history teacher Dan Fullerton was named the 2004 Kansas Outstanding Teacher of American History by the Kansas Society Daughters of the American Revolution.

In 2005, social studies teacher Ron Poplau was named a Disney Teacher Award Honoree.

== Extracurricular activities ==
=== Athletics ===
The Cougars compete in the Sunflower League and are classified as a 6A school, the largest classification in Kansas according to the KSHSAA. Throughout its history, Shawnee Mission Northwest has won many state championships in various sports. Many graduates have gone on to participate in Division I, Division II, and Division III athletics. Spanning from 1994 to 2007, the Northwest boys varsity cross-country team won the state title for fourteen consecutive years and nineteen years overall. The Northwest boys basketball team triumphed over Wichita Heights in the 2024 state championship finals, marking the first state title in school history for basketball. They won again next year in the 2025 state championship against Olathe North High, marking a back-to-back championship reign.

=== State championships ===
State Championships
Season	Sport	Number of Championships	Year
Fall	Football	1	1981
Fall	Gymnastics, Girls	8	1985, 1986, 1993, 1995, 1996, 2000, 2001, 2010
Fall	Volleyball	1	1988
Fall	Soccer, Boys	4	1990, 1993, 1998, 1999
Fall	Cross Country, Boys	20	1977, 1982, 1989, 1990, 1992, 1994, 1995, 1996, 1997, 1998, 1999, 2000, 2001, 2002, 2003, 2004, 2005, 2006, 2007, 2010, 2012
Fall	Cross Country, Girls	13	1980, 1981, 1990, 1991, 1992, 1994, 1995, 1998, 2000, 2001, 2003, 2005, 2011
Spring	Basketball, Boys	2	2024, 2025
Spring	Golf, Boys	2	1985, 1989
Spring	Golf, Girls	2	1998, 1999
Spring	Track & Field, Boys	3	2002, 2011, 2012
Spring	Tennis, Boys	1	1997, 2002
Spring	Baseball	3	1990, 1991, 1993
Spring	Softball	6	1976, 1994, 1997, 2000, 2002, 2003
Spring	Total		66

=== School newspaper and yearbook ===
The school newspaper is The Northwest Passage and the yearbook is The Lair. The Passage, Lair, and the journalism website have received national recognition at journalism conventions across the country, including awards like the Crown Award from the Columbia Scholastic Press Association and Pacemaker awards from the National Scholastic Press Association.

== Notable alumni ==
- Craig Bolerjack (1976), sportscaster
- Willie Fritz (1978), college football coach
- Holly Lou Teeter (1998), United States District Judge for the District of Kansas
- Ryan Lilja (2000), former American football guard for the Kansas State Wildcats in college then professionally for Kansas City Chiefs and Indianapolis Colts
- Mike Rivera (2004), former linebacker for the Kansas Jayhawks, played professionally for five National Football League teams
- Ryan Torain (2004), former running back for the Arizona State Sun Devils, played professionally for three National Football League teams
- Kyle Vogt (2004), founder of Justin.tv and founder and former CEO of Cruise Automation
- Alex Carder (2008), former quarterback for the Western Michigan Broncos, plays professionally for the Portland Thunder in the Arena Football League
- Mandy Matney (2008), journalist, podcaster and author
- Keaton Wagler (2025), college basketball player for the Illinois Fighting Illini, he was a first round pick in the 2026 NBA Draft going 5th to the Los Angeles Clippers.

== See also ==
- List of high schools in Kansas
- List of unified school districts in Kansas

Other high schools in Shawnee Mission USD 512 school district

- Shawnee Mission East High School in Prairie Village
- Shawnee Mission North High School in Overland Park
- Shawnee Mission South High School in Overland Park
- Shawnee Mission West High School in Overland Park
