= Ed Eilert =

Former mayor of Overland Park, Kansas

Edwin C. Eilert

Mayor of Overland Park, Kansas
- In office April 1981 – April 2005
- Succeeded by: Carl R. Gerlach

Personal details
- Born: 1939 or 1940 (age 86–87) Furley, Kansas, U.S.
- Party: Republican
- Spouse: Jan
- Children: 3
- Education: Emporia State University (BSB, MS)

Edwin C. Eilert is an American politician and businessperson who served in local government in Johnson County, Kansas. A member of the Republican Party, he served on the Overland Park City Council from 1977 to 1981 and as the mayor of Overland Park from 1981 to 2005. Eilert also served on the Johnson County Board of County Commissioners from 2007 to 2023, serving as chairman from 2011 until his retirement.

== Early life and education ==
Eilert was born and raised in Furley, Kansas, and attended high school in nearby Whitewater, Kansas, graduating in 1957. He went on to earn a bachelor's degree in business administration and a master's degree in business education from Emporia State University, where he also met his wife, Jan.

== Career ==
=== Private sector ===
After his graduation from Emporia State, Eilert worked as a high school business teacher, with the goal of becoming a school administrator. He first taught at Lebo High School and then moved to Overland Park in 1965 to teach at Shawnee Mission East High School in Prairie Village, Kansas. He left teaching in 1966 to work as a financial advisor, continuing in that field until he retired from A. G. Edwards in 2008.

=== Political career ===
Eilert's career in politics began with his election to the Overland Park City Council, where he represented Ward 2 from 1977 to 1981. He was then elected mayor of Overland Park, serving for 24 years until he retired from the city in 2005. During his tenure as mayor, the city saw an over doubling of population, and he oversaw city projects including the construction of the Overland Park Convention Center and the Overland Park Arboretum and Botanical Gardens.

In 2006, Eilert was elected to the Johnson County Board of County Commissioners for District 4, beginning his first term in 2007. He became chairman of the board in 2011. After serving in that role for over a decade, he announced in January 2022 that he would not seek re-election to a fourth term and retired in January 2023.

== Personal life ==
Eilert and his wife, Jan, have three children.
