= Carl Gerlach =

Carl Gerlach may refer to:

- Carl R. Gerlach, mayor of Overland Park, Kansas
- Carl Ludvig Gerlach (1832–1893), Danish composer and opera singer
- Carl Gotthelf Gerlach (1704–1761), German organist
