= Edward L. Hubbard =

Retired USAF colonel

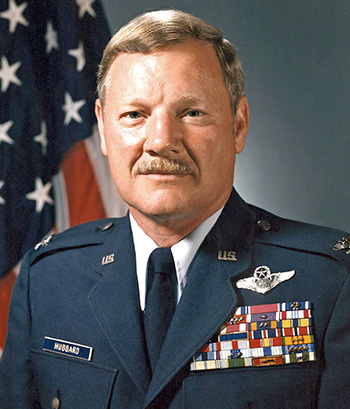
- Official portrait of Col Hubbard, c. 1980s
- Born: Edward Lee Hubbard; May 18, 1938 (age 88); Kansas City, Missouri, U.S.
- Military career
- Allegiance: United States
- Branch: United States Air Force
- Service years: 1955–1990
- Rank: Colonel
- Nickname: "Ed"
- Conflicts: Vietnam War
- Awards: Silver Star; Legion of Merit; Distinguished Flying Cross

Edward Lee Hubbard (born May 18, 1938) is a retired American Air Force officer, author, artist, and internationally known motivational speaker.

== Early life and education ==
Hubbard was born in Kansas City, Missouri in 1938 to Mr. and Mrs. Jess E. Hubbard, and he remained in the area for the first 24 years of his life. He graduated from Shawnee Mission High School in May 1956. From December 1957 to August 1961, he worked in the men's garment industry.

== Military service ==
Hubbard joined the United States Air Force Reserve at Richards-Gebaur Air Force Base in 1955, at age seventeen. While there, he flew as a flight engineer in a C-119. In August 1961, he went on active duty and entered the aviation cadet program at James Connally Air Force Base in Texas for Basic Navigation Training. On July 6, 1962, he was commissioned and received his wings.

On July 20, 1966, while flying his 26th mission over North Vietnam, Hubbard’s EB-66C was shot down by two surface-to-air missiles. Of the six crew members, all but one survived the shoot down and subsequent captivity. Hubbard was a First Lieutenant at the time. After running through the jungle for a number of hours, he was captured by the Viet Cong and put in a POW camp. There, he stayed in a six-by-six-foot cell and lived on less than 300 calories per day. After 2,420 days of being imprisoned, he was finally released on March 4, 1973, along with many others from his camp. This experience changed Hubbard's outlook on life.

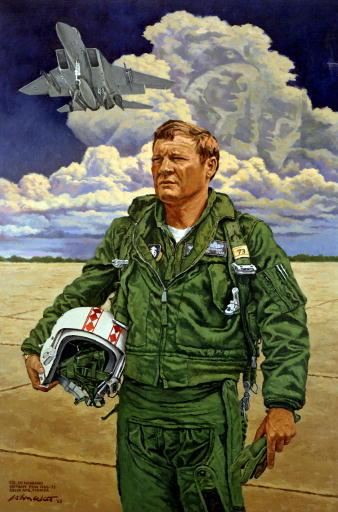
John Witt's life-sized portrait of Hubbard that hangs in the Pentagon.

After returning, Hubbard started using his new, positive way of thinking, and after only eight days of implementation – increased the productivity of a $350 million resource by 50%. He later inherited an organization designated "...the worst managed..." among 58 units by an Air Force audit. Within four months, Ed Hubbard turned the unit around and demonstrated statistically significant improvement in 96% of the audited areas.

During ten years as head of the largest safety organization in the Air Force, they shattered all records. They achieved 30% to 70% improvements in all categories, where a 3% improvement had long been the norm. Ed Hubbard's organization was recognized as "Best in the Air Force" for ten consecutive years, and a previously accepted, multimillion-dollar loss rate per year was reduced to less than fifty thousand dollars per year.

Hubbard retired from the Air Force as a colonel in 1990.

== Honors and awards ==
Since March 22, 1983, a life-sized oil painting of Hubbard by artist, John Witt, hangs inside the Pentagon as part of the United States Air Force Art Collection.

In recognition of his contributions to the Air Force, Hubbard was inducted as an honorary Chief Master Sergeant in

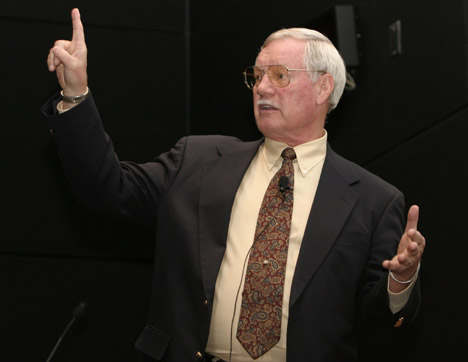
Hubbard speaking at Texas A&M University in 2004.

September 1988.

== Public speaking career and later life ==
When talking about being incarcerated, Hubbard said that nothing he learned in the Air Force prepared him for such an experience, but every day he spent in a cell taught him that survival is possible, even in the most dire situations. In 1985, he became involved in public speaking so that others could benefit from the lessons he learned in captivity. After retiring, he founded Positive Vectors, Inc., a firm dedicated to helping others overcome any obstacle, survive any ordeal, and reach any goal by developing the right state of mind. Since then, Hubbard has traveled all over the country and spoken to thousands of members of corporate America, government agencies, and non-profit organizations. His book, Escape from the Box: The Wonder of Human Potential, was published in January 1994. Hubbard currently lives in Fort Walton Beach, Florida with his wife, Jennifer.
