= Strang Carriage House =

Local history museum in Overland Park, Kansas

Coordinates: 38°58′58″N 94°40′20″W

The Strang Carriage House is a historical building and museum in Overland Park, Kansas. It was originally constructed by William B. Strang Jr. for his carriages, automobiles and to serve as a residence for his driver. The exterior of the building is constructed of rough limestone with a clay tile roof and still has the original doors from its construction (sometime around 1915).

Since 1990, the structure serves as home to the Overland Park Historical Society and showcases a collection of items from the early history of Overland Park and the surrounding area. The location is considered suitable for enthusiasts to complete historical research.

== Image gallery ==
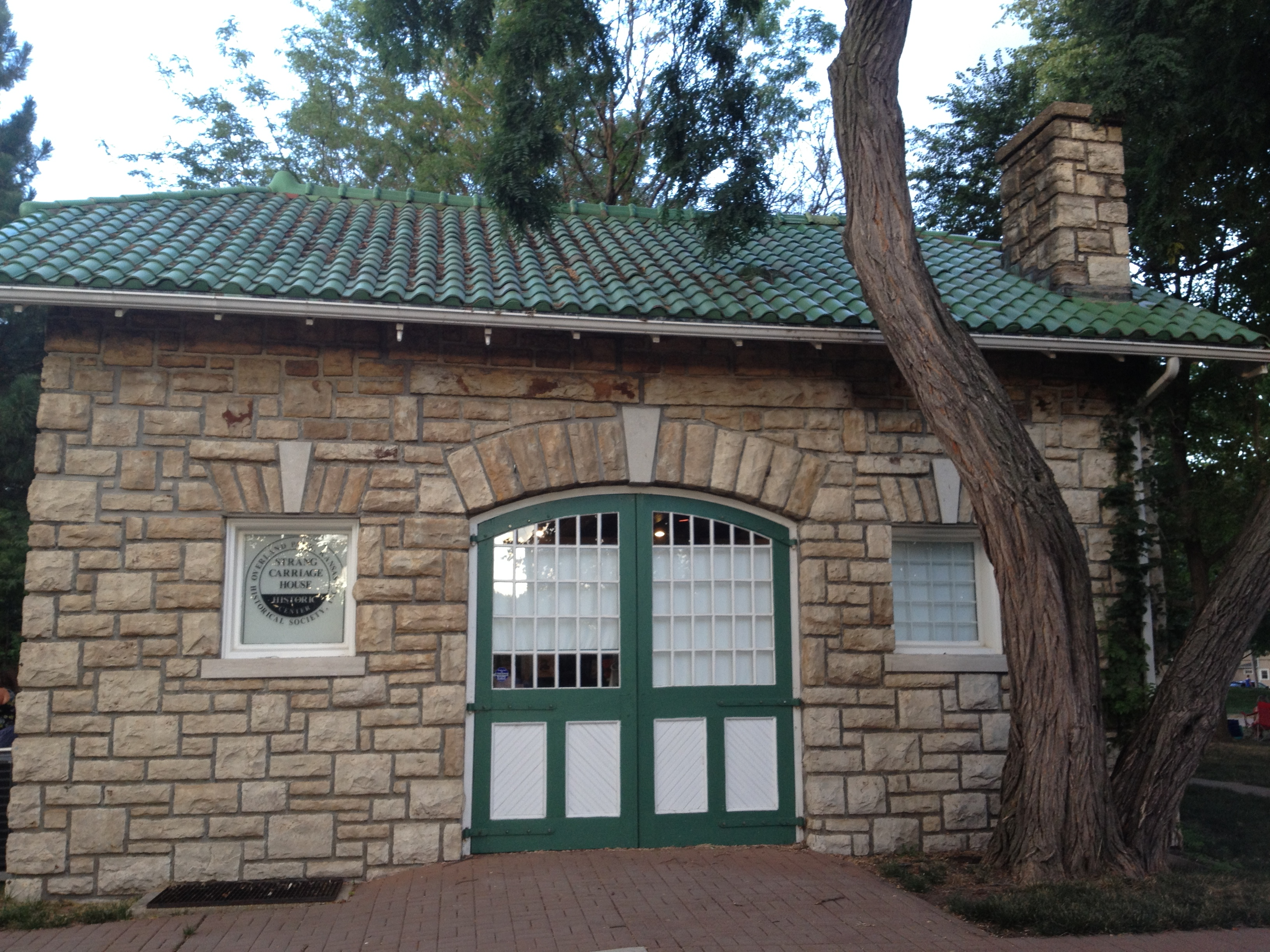
West exterior

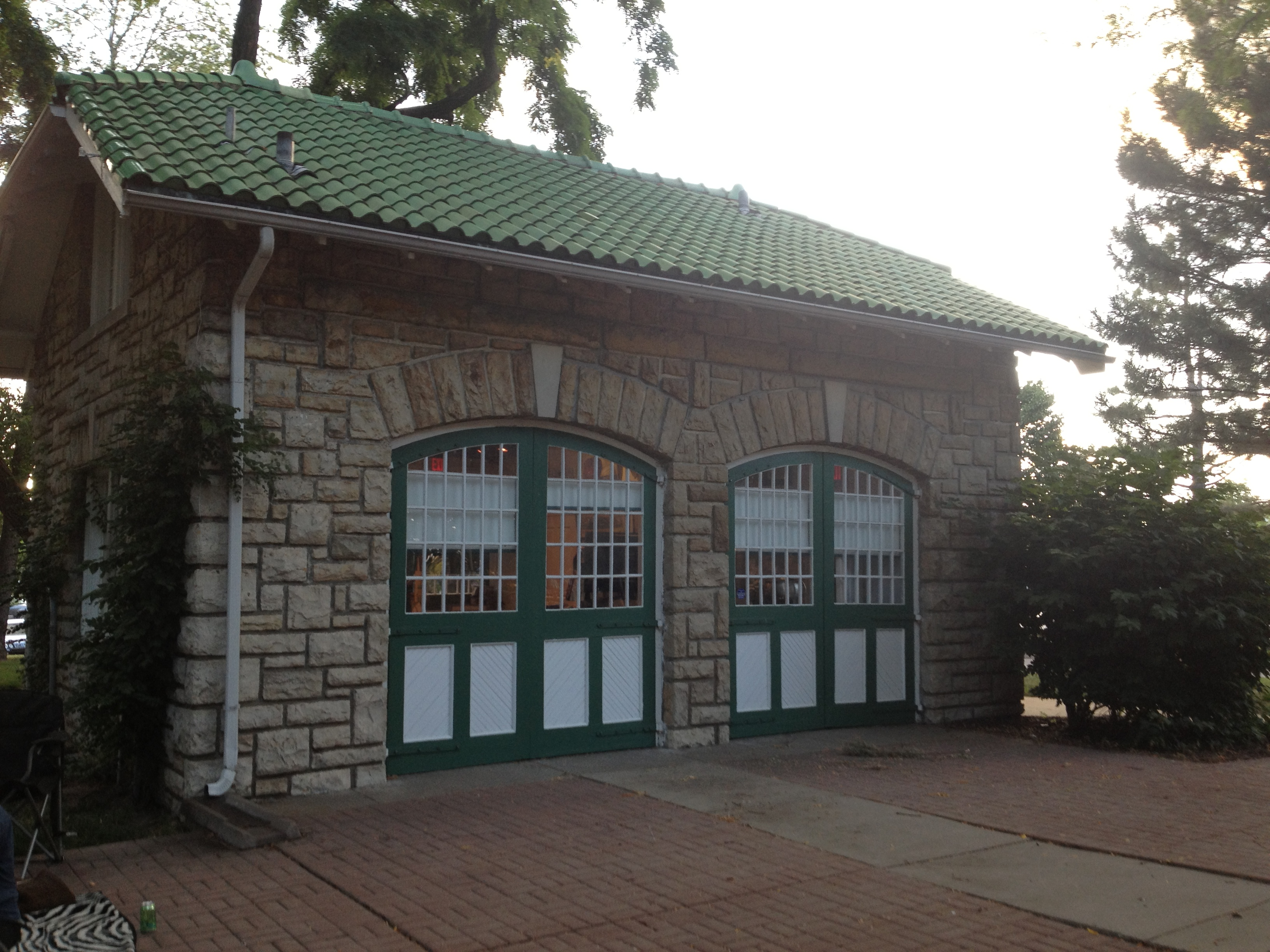
East exterior

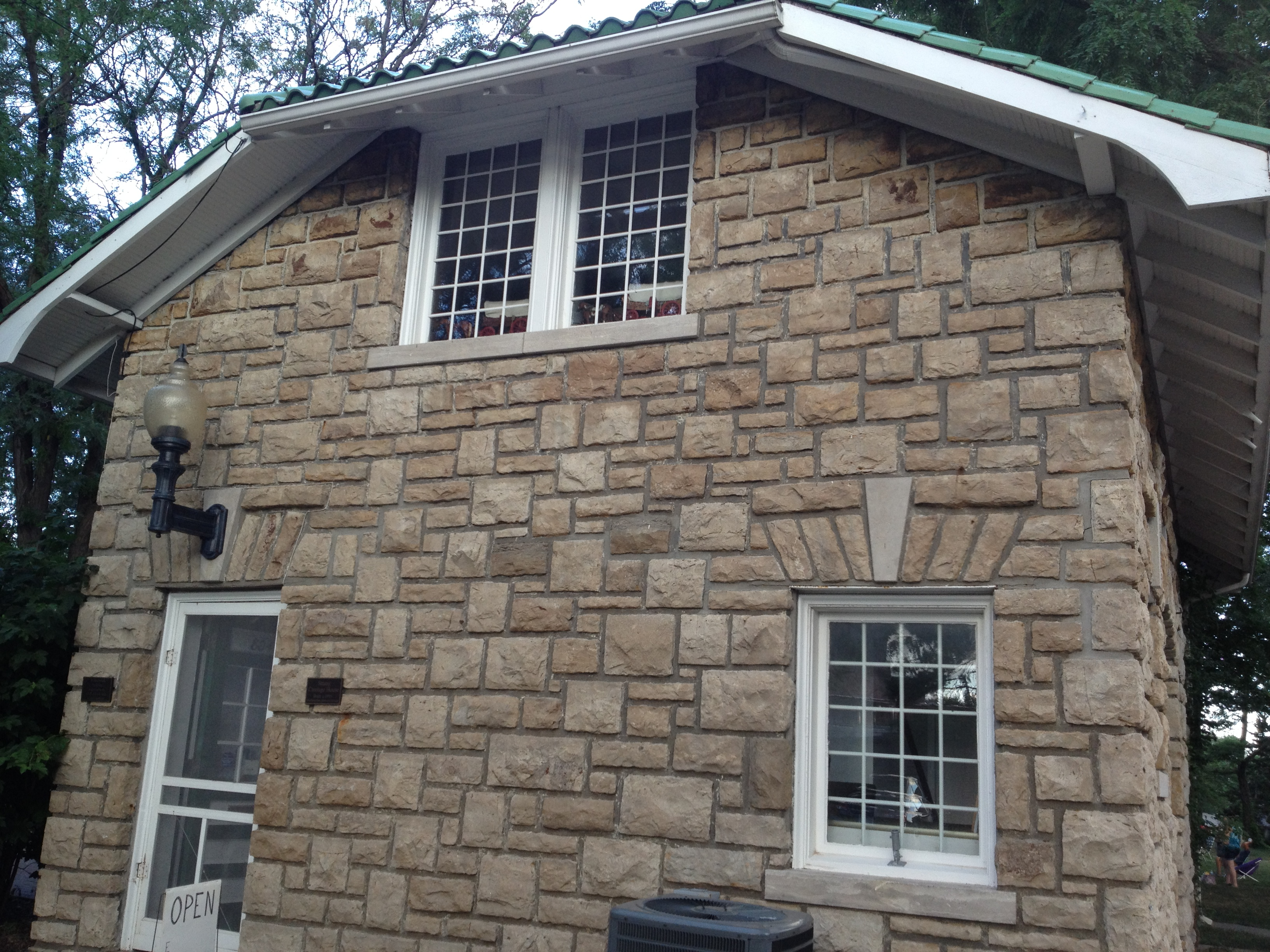
North exterior

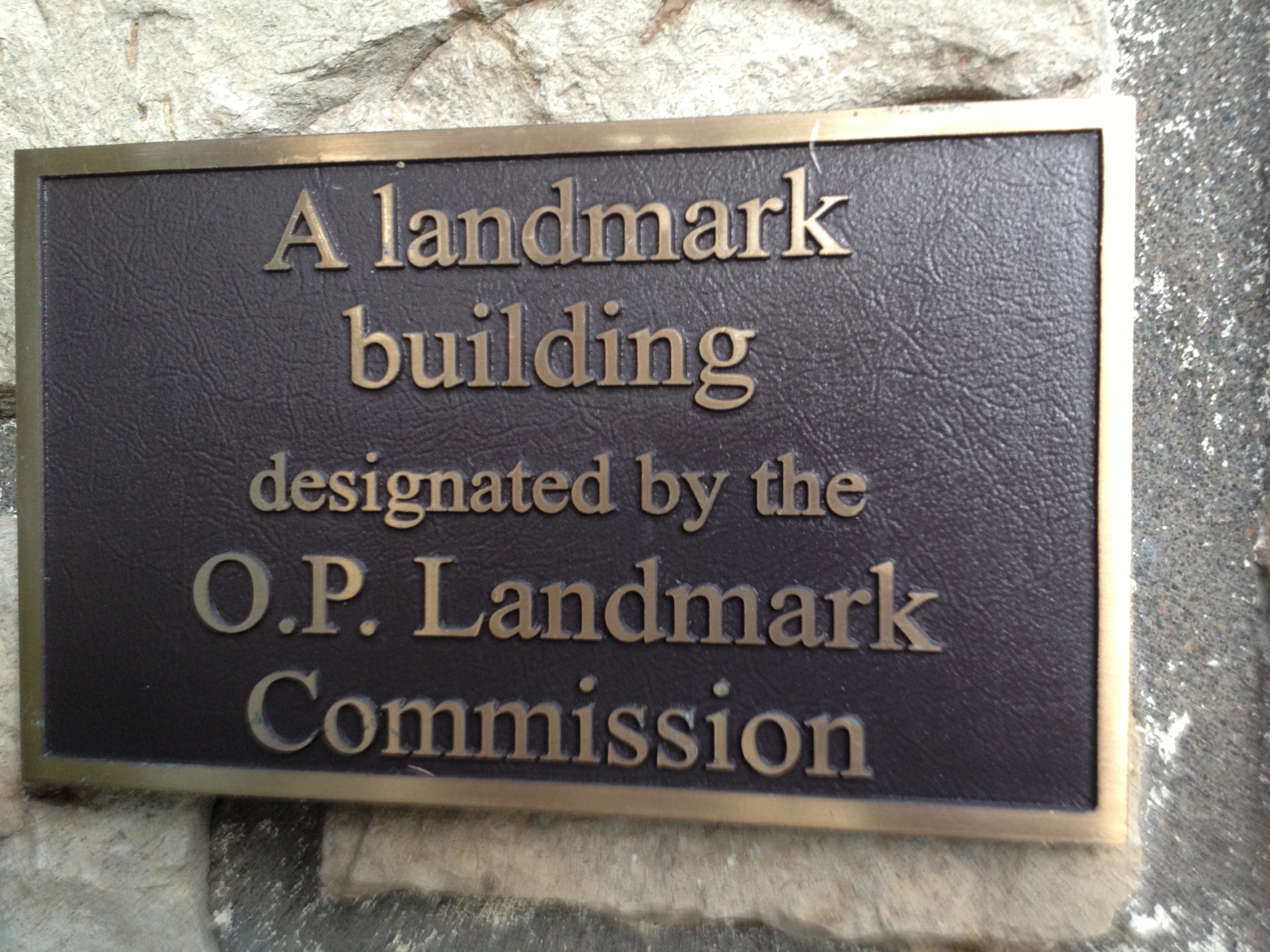
First exterior plaque by entrance

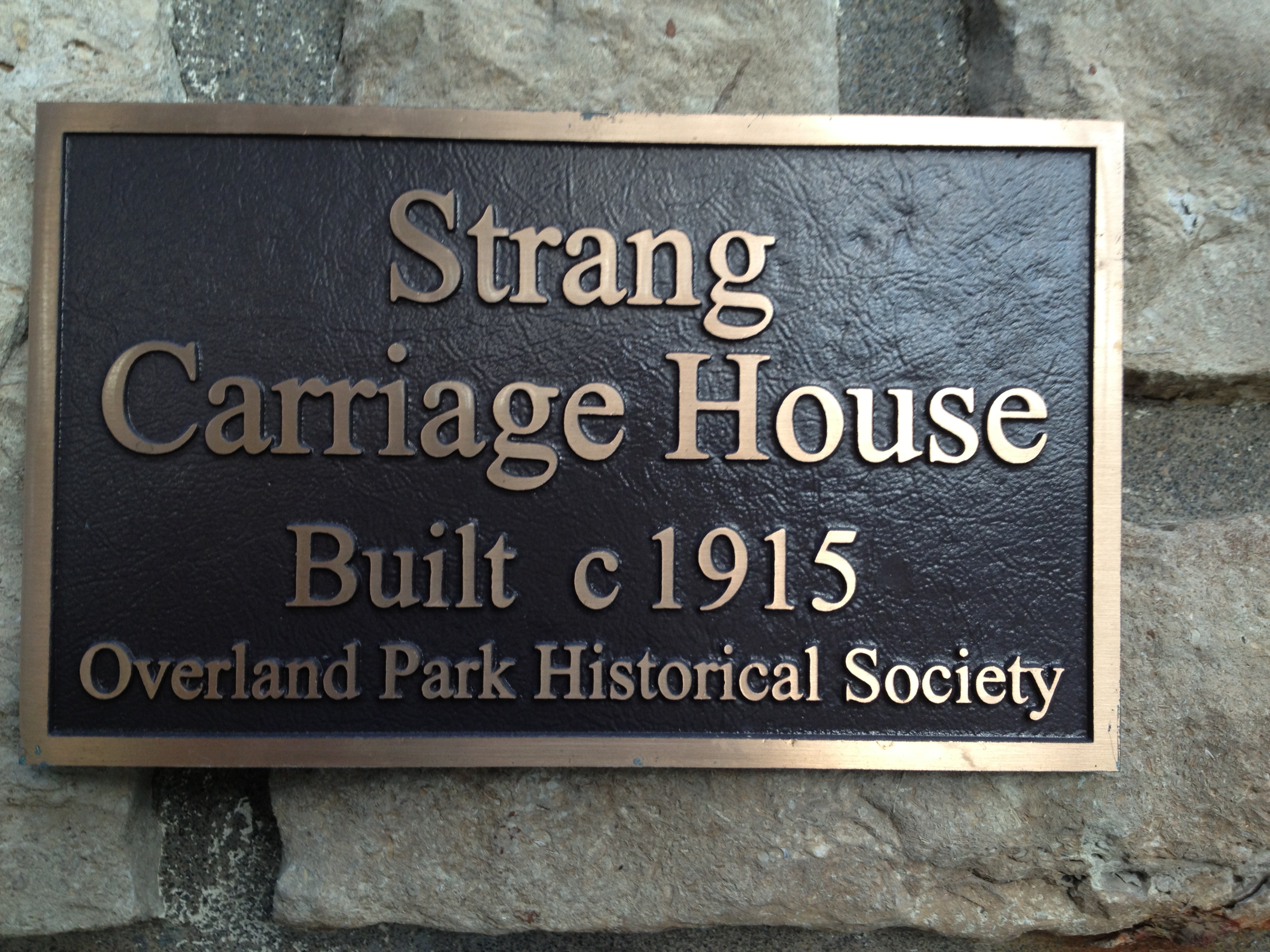
Second exterior plaque by entrance

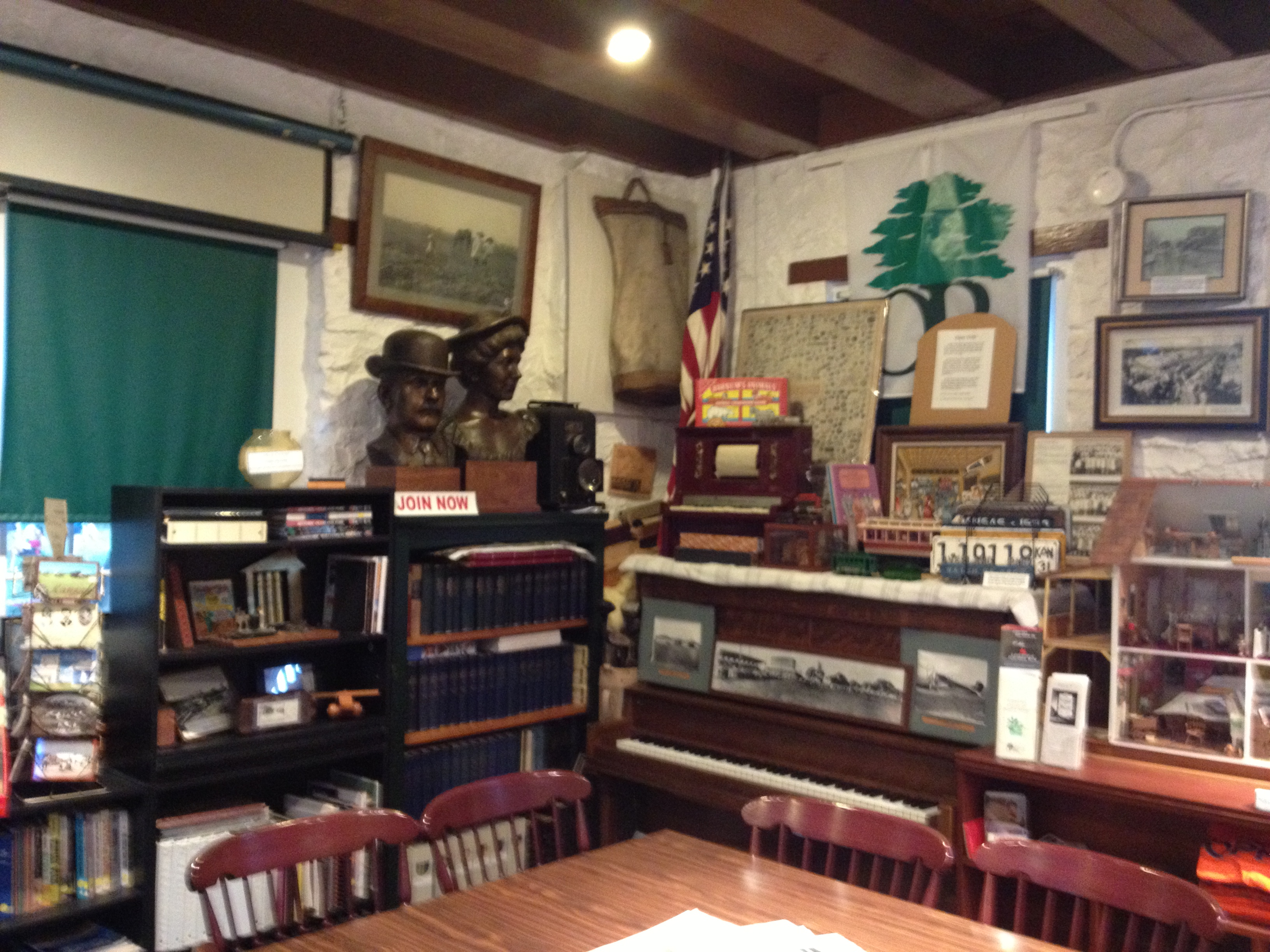
Interior display
