= Shawnee Mission East High School =

Location
- 7500 Mission Road; Prairie Village, Kansas 66208; United States; 38.992206°N 94.631633°W

Information
- School type: Public, High School
- Established: 1958; 68 years ago
- School district: Shawnee Mission USD 512
- CEEB code: 172473
- Principal: Jason Peres
- Teaching staff: 95.60 (FTE)
- Grades: 9–12
- Gender: co-ed
- Enrollment: 1,671 (2023–2024)
- Student to teacher ratio: 17.48
- Campus type: Suburban
- Colors: Columbia blue Black; White
- Fight song: Alma Mater
- Athletics: Class 6A
- Athletics conference: Sunflower League
- Mascot: Lancers
- Rival: Shawnee Mission South; Shawnee Mission West; Rockhurst High School
- Newspaper: The Harbinger
- Yearbook: The Hauberk
- Website: smeast.smsd.org

Shawnee Mission East High School is a public high school in Prairie Village, Kansas, United States, for grades 9 through 12. It is one of five high schools operated by the Shawnee Mission USD 512 school district. Shawnee Mission East is a member of the Kansas State High School Activities Association and offers a variety of sports programs. Athletic teams compete in the 6A division and are known as the Lancers.

== History ==
Shawnee Mission East High School was established in 1958 in order to serve the growing population of northeast Johnson County, Kansas. In January 1994, Shawnee Mission East began offering the International Baccalaureate program.

== Academics ==
Shawnee Mission East has been an IB World School since January 1994.

== Extracurricular activities ==
Extracurricular activities are also offered in the form of performing arts, school publications, and clubs.

=== Athletics ===
The Lancers compete in the Sunflower League and are classified as a 6A, the largest classification in Kansas according to the KSHSAA. Throughout its history, Shawnee Mission East has won many state championships in various sports. Shawnee Mission East also has a cheerleading and dance team, called the Lancer Dancers.

=== State championships ===
State Championships
Season	Sport	Number of Championships	Year
Fall	Football, Boys	1	2014
Fall	Policy Debate	11	1969, 1990, 1992, 1997, 2001, 2002, 2006, 2013, 2014, 2015, 2016
Fall	Cross Country, Boys	3	1966, 1967, 2022
Fall	Cross Country, Girls	6	1982, 1983, 1989, 1993, 1997, 1999
Fall	Golf, Girls	7	1979, 1980, 1987, 2012, 2015, 2019, 2020
Fall	Soccer, Boys	1	2024
Winter	Swimming and Diving, Boys	18	1974, 1975, 1978, 1979, 1985, 1990, 2005, 2006, 2007, 2008, 2010, 2012, 2015, 2016, 2017, 2018, 2022, 2026
Winter	Basketball, Girls	1	1983
Winter	Bowling, Boys	1	2022
Spring	Golf, Boys	14	1986, 1987, 1988, 1990, 2001, 2008, 2010, 2011, 2014, 2016, 2018, 2019, 2025, 2026
Spring	Tennis, Boys	30	1959, 1963, 1965, 1966, 1967, 1968, 1969, 1970, 1971, 1974, 1975,1978, 1980, 1991, 1994, 1996, 1998, 1999, 2001, 2002, 2004, 2006, 2008, 2009, 2012 (won both singles & doubles titles in some years), 2013, 2014, 2019, 2021, 2022
Spring	Tennis, Girls	21	1972, 1973, 1974, 1976, 1977, 1978, 1981, 1983, 1991, 1992, 1995, 2003, 2008, 2011, 2012, 2013, 2014, 2019, 2020, 2021, 2022
Spring	Baseball	3	1984, 1995, 2016
Spring	Rugby	4	1999, 2001, 2002, 2004
Spring	Soccer, Girls	3	1997, 1999, 2000
Spring	Lacrosse, Boys	8	2011 (LAKS), 2012 (LAKC), 2013, 2016, 2018, 2019, 2025, 2026
Spring	Swimming and Diving, Girls	16	1975, 1977, 1978, 1979, 1980, 1981, 1982, 1983, 1987, 1988, 2010, 2011, 2012, 2013, 2014, 2016
Spring	Total		146

== Notable alumni ==
- Sandahl Bergman, actress, won the Golden Globe Award for New Star of the Year for her role in Conan the Barbarian
- Barbara Bollier, member of the Kansas Senate representing the 7th district, Democratic candidate for US Senate
- Bruce Branit, Emmy-nominated visual effects artist of Westworld and Breaking Bad
- George Brophy, former professional baseball executive
- W. Bruce Cameron, author of A Dog's Purpose and several other novels
- John Carmack, video game programmer, id Software co-founder, lead programmer of the classic video game Doom
- Eric Darnell, director, writer, songwriter, animator, voice actor
- Brooke Dillman, actress and comedian
- Steve Doerr, former professional soccer player
- Donald Fehr, executive director of the National Hockey League Players' Association, former Major League Baseball players union representative
- Thomas Frank, founder of The Baffler, Harper's columnist and author of What's the Matter with Kansas?
- Joy Franz, actress and singer
- Mary Long, soccer player
- Kip Niven, actor
- Nancy Opel, singer/actress with Tony Award nomination
- G.P. "Bud" Peterson, former President of the Georgia Institute of Technology
- Ramesh Ponnuru, senior editor for National Review
- Paul Redford, actor, TV writer and producer for Sports Night, The West Wing, The Newsroom
- Melissa Rooker, Kansas House of Representatives
- Jim Roth, member of Oklahoma Corporation Commission, first openly gay statewide official in Oklahoma
- Eleanor Smart, high diver
- Charlie Thurston, actor and playwright
- Grant Wahl, writer for Sports Illustrated, author of The Beckham Experiment
- Joey Wentz, professional baseball pitcher

== See also ==
- List of high schools in Kansas
- List of unified school districts in Kansas

Other high schools in Shawnee Mission USD 512 school district

- Shawnee Mission North High School in Overland Park
- Shawnee Mission Northwest High School in Shawnee
- Shawnee Mission South High School in Overland Park
- Shawnee Mission West High School in Overland Park
