= Carl R. Gerlach =

Mayor of Overland Park, Kansas from 2005 to 2021

Carl Gerlach
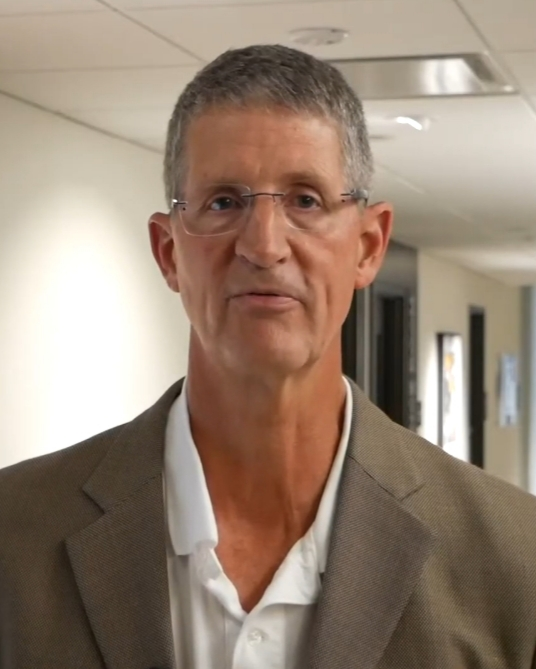

Mayor of Overland Park, Kansas
- In office 2005 – December 6, 2021
- Preceded by: Ed Eilert
- Succeeded by: Curt Skoog

Personal details
- Party: Republican

Carl R. Gerlach is an American politician who served as the mayor of Overland Park, Kansas from 2005 to 2021.

== Early life and education ==
Gerlach grew up in Leawood, Kansas, and graduated from Shawnee Mission South High School in 1972. He earned his bachelor's degree in business administration in 1976 from Kansas State University, where he also played on the men's basketball team. He was drafted by the Atlanta Hawks in 1976, but was released from his contract due to an injury suffered during training. Soon thereafter he started a career in the promotional products industry.

== Political career ==
Gerlach served on the Overland Park city council from 1995 to 2005. He was first elected as mayor in 2005, replacing Ed Eilert. Gerlach ran unopposed in his next two elections in 2009 and 2013. He then beat his first challenger for mayor in 12 years, when he ran for a fourth term in 2017. Gerlach did not run in the city's 2021 mayoral election and was succeeded by Overland Park city council member, Curt Skoog.

Gerlach is a Republican.
