= Overland Park Arboretum and Botanical Gardens =

Arboretum and botanical garden in Overland Park, Kansas, United States

Coordinates: 38.800°N 94.692°W

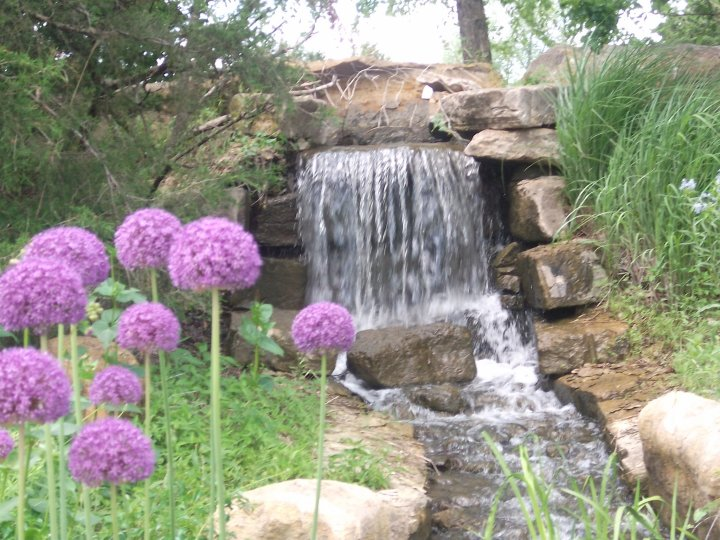
- Waterfall and flowers at the Water Garden
- Interactive map of Overland Park Arboretum and Botanical Gardens
- Owner: City of Overland Park
- Website: Official website

Overland Park Arboretum and Botanical Gardens (120 hectares / 300 acres) is an arboretum and botanical garden that was opened in 1991. It is located a mile west of U.S. Highway 69 on 179th Street, Overland Park, Kansas. It is owned and operated by the City of Overland Park, Kansas, a city in the greater Kansas City metropolitan area.

== Overview ==
The arboretum includes mature trees and limestone bluffs, with nearly 6 miles (9.7 km) of trails and two bridges across Wolf Creek, a major tributary of the Blue River. The Arboretum opened in 1990 and the first garden was dedicated in 1996. The arboretum has been developed over 20 years, with nearly 85 percent of the site set aside for natural ecosystems. The remaining property is earmarked for gardens, buildings, etc.

=== Ecosystems ===
At present, 8 ecosystems have been identified within the arboretum:

- Dry-Mesic Prairie - grasses such as big bluestem, little bluestem, and Indian grass.
- Dry Oak-Savanna - widely spaced oaks in a prairie invaded by woody species.
- Dry Oak-Hickory - shagbark hickory, black oak, and post oak.
- Mesic Oak-Hickory Forest - white ash, bitternut hickory, shagbark hickory, hackberry, leatherwood, bur oak, red oak, chinquapin oak, pawpaw, and black walnut.
- Riparian Woodland - green ash, eastern cottonwood, elm, hackberry, bitternut hickory, silver maple, honey locust, red mulberry, bur oak, osage-orange, sycamore, black walnut, and black willow.
- Wooded Draws - juniper, rough-leaf dogwood, red elm, and buck brush as well as pale purple coneflower, milkweeds, prickly pear, and grasses.
- Dry Wooded Swales - Similar to the Wooded Draws but with dryer, shallower soil.
- Old Field - a severely disturbed zone due to over-grazing and cropping.

=== Gardens ===
Gardens developed to date are:

- Betsy and Gordon Ross Herb Garden (unknown opening) - shows a variety of common (and uncommon) herbs.
- Welcome Garden (1991) - welcomes visitors with a colorful arrow of plants and flowers.
- Erickson Water Garden (1996) - unusual aquatic and bog plants, a Buddleia collection, wildflowers and ornamental grasses.
- Marder Woodland Garden (1999) - a woodlands trail through ferns, dogwoods, native understudy, and a rhododendron and azalea garden.
- Legacy Garden (2000) - plants native or naturalized to Kansas.
- Children's Discovery Garden (2000) - a story tree, frog pond, mulberry wood, and other amusements for children.
- Cohen Iris Garden (2001) - a colorful showcase of Iris Varieties.
- Monet Garden (2003) - a one-acre recreation of the famous Water Lilies series by Claude Monet. It attempts to emulate the style of Monet's famous paintings of the gardens at Giverny.
- Train Garden (2012) - The first railroad layout, The Leaky Roof Line, was completed in 2012. Soon the Leatherwood Depot – a sheltered area with picnic tables was constructed in 2013. The Arboretum's version of Old Downtown Overland Park and the Strang Line Trolley was opened in 2014. The final phase of the garden opened in 2019.
- Stous Promenade (2015) - a collection of trees, open to reserve for weddings.

== See also ==
- List of botanical gardens in the United States
