= Curt Skoog =

Mayor of Overland Park, Kansas

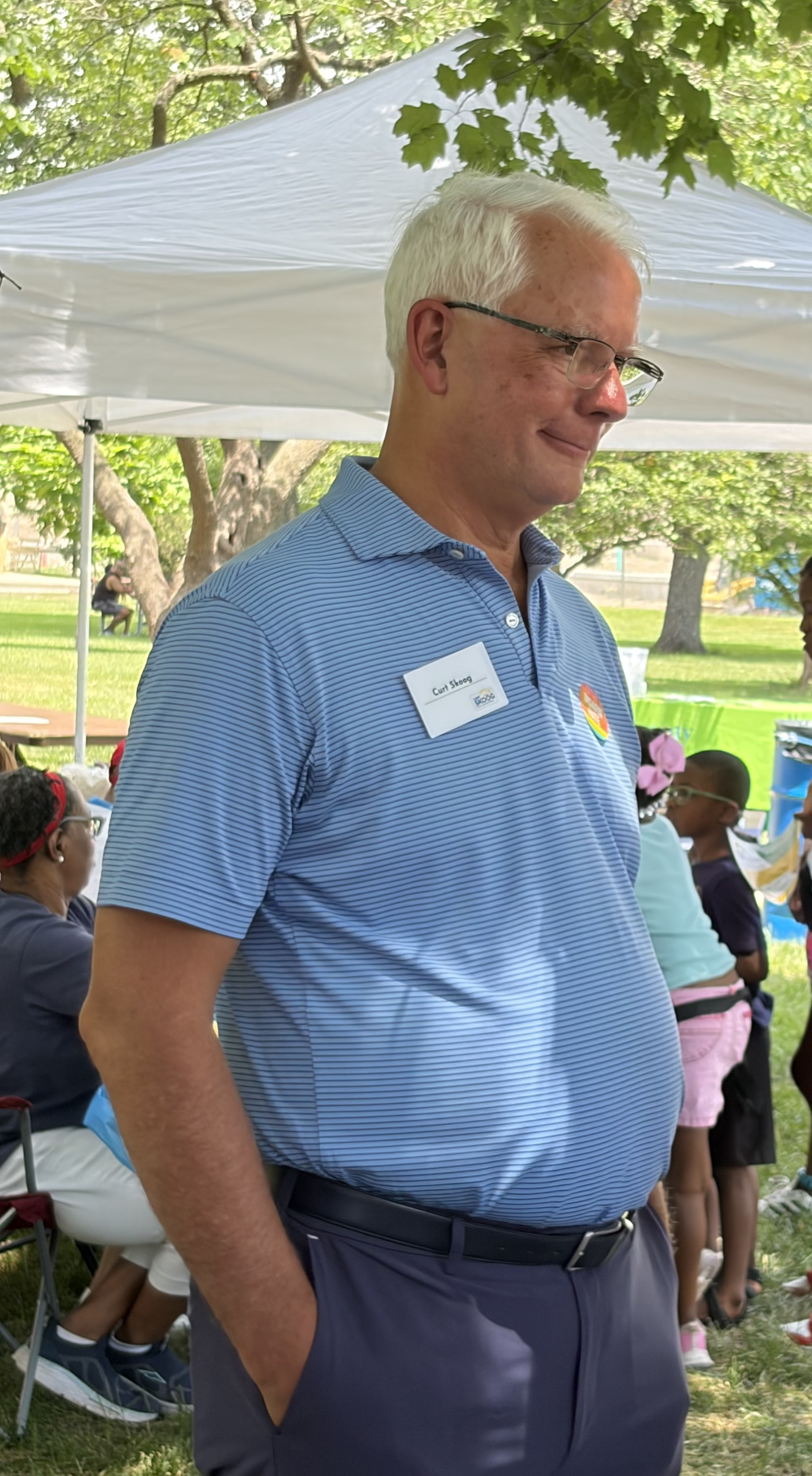
- Skoog at Juneteenth event, 2026

Mayor of Overland Park
- Incumbent
- Assumed office December 2021
- Preceded by: Carl R. Gerlach

Personal details
- Born: 1963 or 1964 (age 62–63)
- Party: Democratic
- Spouse: Amy Skoog
- Children: 3
- Education: University of Kansas (BBA)
- Website: Campaign website

Curt Skoog (born 1963/1964) is an American politician and businessperson who has served as the mayor of Overland Park, Kansas, since 2021. A member of the Democratic Party, Skoog served from 2005 to 2021 as a member of the Overland Park City Council.

== Early life and education ==
Skoog was raised in Topeka, Kansas. He attended the University of Kansas, where he earned a Bachelor of Business Administration degree from the School of Business in 1985.

== Career ==
=== Private sector ===
Skoog has held various roles in marketing and business development. He has held positions at Missouri Gas Energy, Nations Media Partners, Universal Asset Management, and H&R Block, where he served as director of business development for Digital Tax Solutions.

Since 2014, Skoog has worked for the Institute for Building Technology and Safety (IBTS), where he serves as a local government services development lead. He also operated a consulting firm, Skoog Consulting, from 2012 to 2015.

=== Political career ===
Skoog's career in local government began with his election to the Overland Park City Council in 2005. He served on the council for 16 years, during which time he held the position of city council president in 2021.

In November 2021, Skoog was elected mayor of Overland Park. He was re-elected to a second term in November 2025. His administration has focused on the implementation of "Framework OP," a comprehensive plan emphasizing housing, economic development, mobility, and land use.

In addition to his municipal roles, Skoog has been an appointed member of the Mid-America Regional Council (MARC) Board of Directors since 2005, serving a term as the board's chair. He has also held leadership roles in community organizations, including the Shawnee Mission School District South Area Advisory Board and the Kenilworth Homes Association.

On June 1, 2026, Skoog entered the Democratic primary for Kansas governor with physician Jen Bacani McKenney as his running mate for lieutenant governor. He finished third in the August 4 primary, behind Ethan Corson and winner Cindy Holscher.

== Personal life ==
Skoog is married to Amy, with whom he has three children and six grandchildren. On August 25, 2024, Skoog was hospitalized after being involved in a single-vehicle collision in Kansas City, Kansas, which was attributed to a medical event.
