= Shawnee Mission, Kansas =

Area of Johnson County, Kansas

Coordinates: 39°01′12″N 94°39′57″W

Shawnee Mission /ʃɔːniˈmɪʃən/ is a region of northern Johnson County, Kansas, part of the Kansas City metropolitan area in the United States. Since August 1, 1960, the United States Postal Service has used the name to denote a postal coverage area (ZIP Codes 662xx) at the northeastern tip of Johnson County. It contains numerous municipalities, and the name was created to structure management of the post offices located therein. These post office branches are administered by the postmaster of the main Shawnee Mission Post Office in Mission, Kansas. A mailing address within Shawnee Mission may be indicated with the "city" place as either Shawnee Mission, or the actual city name, and be treated the same.

The following towns are included in the postal area known as Shawnee Mission:

- Countryside (incorporated into the City of Mission in January, 2003)
- Fairway
- Lake Quivira (the northern part is in Wyandotte County, Kansas)
- Leawood
- Lenexa
- Merriam
- Mission
- Mission Hills
- Mission Woods
- Overland Park (except some southern parts)
- Prairie Village
- Roeland Park
- Shawnee
- Stanley (unincorporated)
- Westwood
- Westwood Hills

Parts of southern Overland Park are not part of Shawnee Mission, as they were later annexed from the town of Stillwell which was already covered by ZIP Code 66085. Additionally, delivery to the eastern edge of Overland Park was assigned to the Post Office in Prairie Village, with ZIP Code 66208, and the Prairie Village post office was not managed under the Shawnee Mission designation until 2012.

== History ==
The name Shawnee Mission was derived from the Shawnee Methodist Mission. That historical mission to the Shawnee tribe was founded in 1830 by the Methodist church, in what became Wyandotte County, Kansas. The mission was moved to what became Johnson County in 1839. Shawnee Mission subsequently became a local, informal designation for the region surrounding the actual mission, especially before the development, expansion, and conjoint boundarying of the various towns in northeast Johnson County. The Shawnee Mission School District and Blue Valley School District encompass most of the area.

Shawnee Mission is part of the Kansas City metropolitan area. As of 2015, the estimated combined population of Shawnee Mission's constituent cities is 402,662 (up from 325,147 in 2000). That is greater than the largest city in Kansas, Wichita.

== Notable people ==
- Harold Blaine Miller, former Public Relations Director of the United States Navy, rear admiral (USN), Eisenhower appointee, pilot, public relations executive, college administrator, and author.
