= Shawnee Mission USD 512 =

Public school district in Shawnee Mission, Kansas

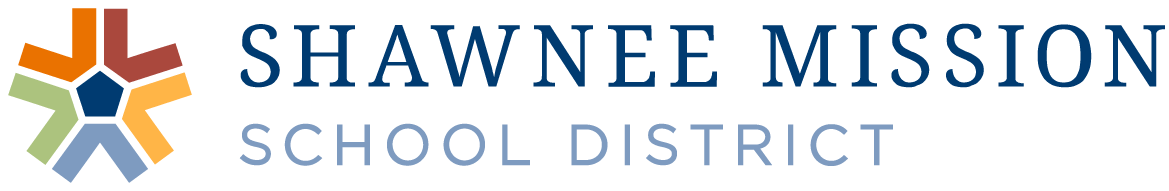

Address
- 8200 W. 71st St. Shawnee Mission, Kansas, 66204; United States

District information
- Type: Public
- Grades: PreK to 12
- Superintendent: Michael Schumacher

Other information
- Website: smsd.org

Shawnee Mission USD 512 is a public unified school district headquartered in Shawnee Mission, Kansas, United States. The district comprises five high schools, five middle schools, 34 elementary schools, and six District centers. In the 2023–24 school year, district enrollment is approximately 26,200 students.

== History ==
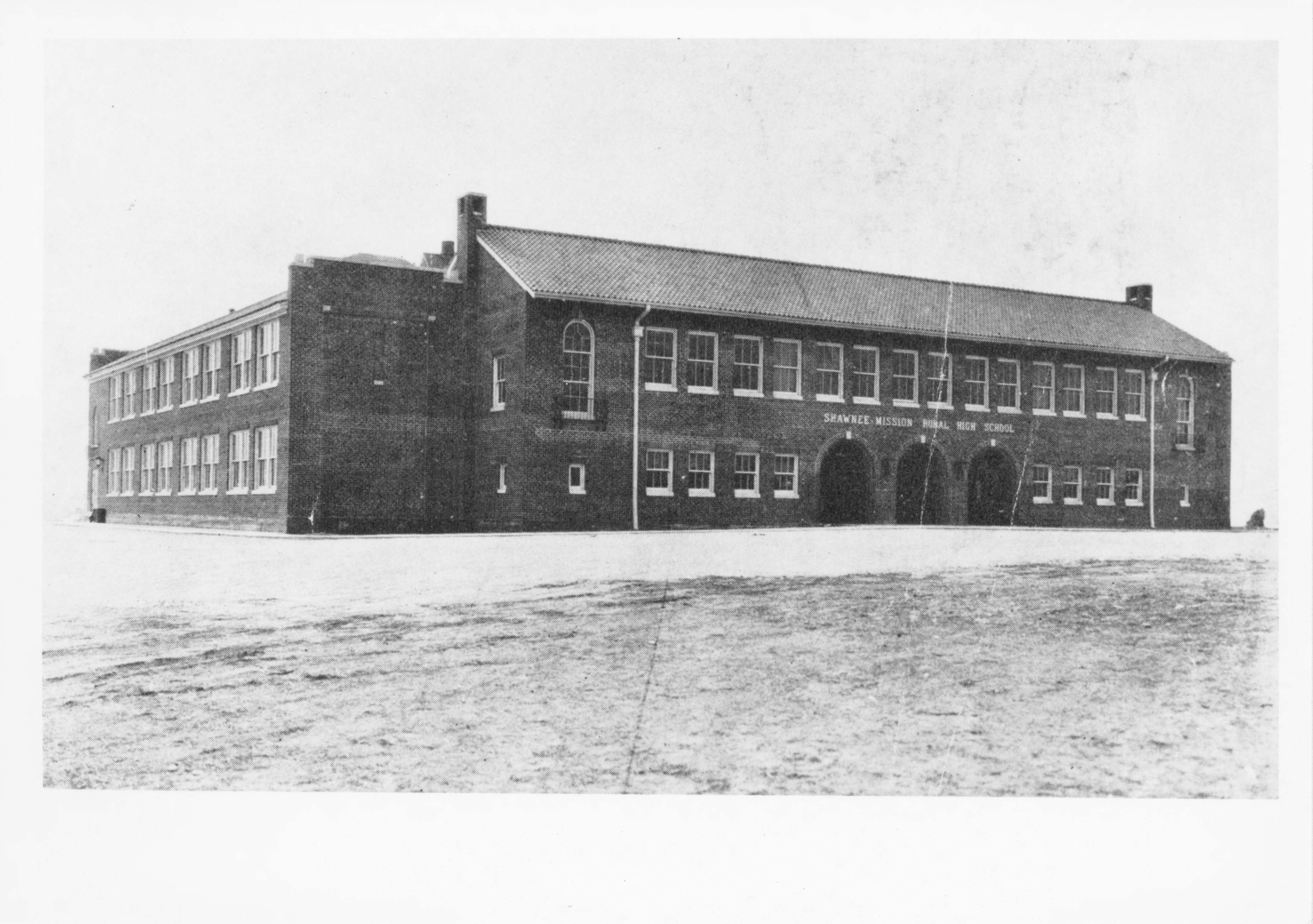
Original Shawnee Mission Rural High School - Opened in 1922

In 1969, several school districts unified to become the Shawnee Mission School District. These districts were Greenwood District 39, Shawnee District 22, Lenexa District 500, Districts 10 and 90, Valley View District 49, Overland Park District 10, Linwood District 1, Roeland District 92, Merriam District 99, Antioch District 61, Westwood View District 93, Prairie District 44, and Corinth District 82. South Park Elementary school, in Merriam, Kansas, played a role in school desegregation before the unification of the Shawnee Mission School District. South Park opened in 1948 for white students, leaving African-American students in the inadequate Walker Elementary using an outdated curriculum. Corinthian Nutter, an African-American teacher, resigned in protest and taught the students from her home. In 1949, the Webb vs. School District 90 case paved the way for Brown v. Board of Education five years later.

McAuliffe Elementary School in Lenexa, Kansas, was one of the first schools in the nation named in honor of Christa McAuliffe.

The district converted from the 7–8–9 junior high model to the 7–8 middle school model in 1986.

The Superintendent is Michael Schumacher and was selected by the Board of Education on February 12, 2024.

== Shawnee Mission North High School ==
Shawnee Mission Rural High School opened on September 12, 1922, having cost $950,000 to build. It had 12 faculty members and a senior class of 20. The school colors are Red, Black, and White, and the school mascot was the Indian.

There had been a vote on September 21, 1921, on a "proposal to organize a rural high school district." The school was named ' Shawnee Mission Rural until 1945 when senior Robert F. Bennett was sent to Topeka to petition the legislature for a name change to more accurately reflect the school's suburban status. Later elected Governor of Kansas, Bennett was named North's first Distinguished Alumnus by the class of 1975. It was thus named Shawnee Mission High School until 1958 when Shawnee Mission East High School opened and Shawnee Mission High School was renamed Shawnee Mission North High School. The student body of Shawnee Mission High School had petitioned the school board to name the new school anything other than Shawnee Mission East High School in an attempt to avoid a renaming of their school.

In Fall 2021, the mascot changed from the Indian to the Bison.

In the 2023–24 school year, enrollment was approximately 1,507 students.

=== Feeder schools ===
- Middle schools
  - Hocker Grove Middle School
- Elementary schools
  - Bluejacket-Flint Elementary School
  - Crestview Elementary School
  - East Antioch Elementary School
  - Merriam Park Elementary School
  - Nieman Elementary School
  - Santa Fe Trail Elementary School
  - Roesland Elementary School
  - Rushton Elementary School

== Shawnee Mission East High School ==
Shawnee Mission East High School opened in 1958. The mascot is the Lancer and the colors are Columbia blue, black, and white.

Shawnee Mission East is at the southwest corner of 75th Street and Mission Road in the city of Prairie Village, and serves Prairie Village along with the other Kansas suburbs Westwood, Westwood Hills, Mission Hills, Mission Woods, Fairway, Leawood, and Overland Park.

In the 2023–24 school year, enrollment is approximately 1,671 students.

=== Feeder schools ===
- Middle Schools
  - Indian Hills Middle School
- Elementary Schools
  - Belinder Elementary School
  - Briarwood Elementary School
  - Corinth Elementary School
  - Highlands Elementary School
  - Prairie Elementary School
  - Tomahawk Elementary School
  - Westwood View Elementary School
  - Trailwood Elementary School

== Shawnee Mission South High School ==
Shawnee Mission South's school colors are green and gold and its mascot is the Raider. The school's mascot was chosen by the first graduating class of 1967. The Raider was chosen as a mascot because of the popular band Paul Revere and the Raiders. Juniors from Shawnee Mission East and Shawnee Mission West were assigned to Shawnee Mission South the first year the school opened. Most of the students from the South come from the middle school Indian Woods. South has a newspaper called The Patriot and a yearbook called Heritage.

In the 2023–24 school year, enrollment is approximately 1,594 students.

=== Feeder schools ===
- Middle Schools
  - Indian Woods Middle School (formerly Nallwood Junior High School)
- Elementary Schools
  - Brookridge Elementary School
  - Brookwood Elementary School
  - John Diemer Elementary School
  - Rosehill Elementary School
  - Oak Park-Carpenter Elementary School
  - Trailwood Elementary School

== Shawnee Mission West High School ==
Shawnee Mission West's mascot is the Viking and the official school colors are black and gold. West opened its doors in 1962; since then, it has been remodeled several times. Additions have also been made to the school, the most famous of which is "the bridge," an actual bridge between halves of the school that later had classrooms added beneath it. It is in Overland Park at 85th Street and Antioch Road.

West is home to both an award-winning school newspaper, the Epic, and a yearbook, SAGA. The Epic was ranked the fifth-best news magazine in the country by the Scholastic Press Association in 2010. West has twice (1986 and 2007) placed second at the National Forensic League tournament for policy debate.

West's student body population is 13.3 percent Black students, which is the highest population of Black students of any Shawnee Mission high school. West is the most ethnically diverse high school in the district with 46.1% of students coming from Hispanic, Asian, or Black backgrounds. West draws its student population from Overland Park, Lenexa, and small parts of Shawnee.

In the 2023–24 school year, enrollment is approximately 1,618 students.

=== Feeder schools ===
- Middle Schools
  - Westridge Middle School (formerly Hillcrest Junior High School)
- Elementary Schools
  - Apache Elementary School
  - Christa McAuliffe Elementary School (Partial)
  - Comanche Elementary School
  - Lenexa Hills Elementary School
  - Overland Park Elementary School
  - Pawnee Elementary School
  - Rising Star Elementary School (Partial)
  - Sunflower Elementary School (Partial)

== Shawnee Mission Northwest High School ==
Shawnee Mission Northwest High School's mascot is the Cougar, and the school colors are black and orange. It is in Shawnee, at 12701 West 67th Street, between Pflumm Road and Quivira Road.

In the 2023–24 school year, enrollment is approximately 1,619 students.

=== Feeder schools ===
- Middle Schools
  - Trailridge Middle School (formerly Trailridge Junior High School)
- Elementary Schools
  - Broken Arrow Elementary School
  - Christa McAuliffe Elementary School (Partial)
  - Mill Creek Elementary School
  - Raymond B. Marsh Elementary School (Ray Marsh)
  - Rhein Benninghoven Elementary School
  - Rising Star Elementary School (Partial)
  - Shawanoe Elementary School
  - Sunflower Elementary School (Partial)

== District centers ==
- Aquatic Center
- Arrowhead Day School (K-12)
- Horizons High School
- Broadmoor Technical Center
- Indian Creek Technical Center
- SM Instructional Support Center

== Former schools ==
- Middle/Junior High Schools
  - Antioch Middle School (formerly Milburn Junior High School)
  - Broadmoor Junior High School
  - Indian Creek Junior High School - now Indian Creek Technical Center
  - Mission Valley Middle School (formerly Meadowbrook Junior High School)
  - Old Mission Junior High School - closed in 1986 - now Bishop Miege Catholic High School, North Campus
- Elementary Schools
  - Antioch Elementary School - now part of the Shawnee Mission Medical Center in Merriam, KS
  - Arrowhead Elementary School - now Arrowhead Day School
  - Cherokee Elementary School - now New Haven Seventh Day Adventist Church
  - Don Bonjour Elementary School - now Shawnee Mission Unitarian Universalist Church
  - Dorothy Moody Elementary School - closed at end of 2011–2012 school year
  - Flint Elementary School - merged with Bluejacket to become Bluejacket-Flint Elementary School
  - Greenwood Elementary School - razed, now a Walmart Supermarket
  - Hickory Grove Elementary School - now Horizons High School
  - Katherine Carpenter Elementary School - merged with Oak Park to become Oak Park-Carpenter Elementary School
  - Linwood Elementary School
  - Marsha Bagby Elementary School
  - Mohawk Elementary School - now Mohawk Park
  - Nall Hills Elementary School
  - Osage Elementary School - now Osage Park
  - Porter Elementary School - now Porter Park
  - Ridgeview Elementary School - now Kansas City Christian School
  - Roeland Park Elementary School - closed in 2003
  - Sequoyah Elementary School - now Vineyard Community Church
  - Shawnee Elementary School
  - Skyline Elementary School
  - Somerset Elementary School - closed in 2004, now Addington Place of Prairie Village
  - South Park Elementary School - merged with Merriam to become Merriam Park Elementary School
  - Valley View Elementary School - now Holy Cross Catholic School
  - West Antioch Elementary School - closed in 2003

== Demographics ==
As of the census of 2000, the district had a population of 219,949 with 93,221 households (or occupied housing units) and 59,084 families. 69.0 percent of the housing units were occupied by the owner. The racial makeup of the district was 91.0 percent White, 2.6 percent Black or African American, 0.3 percent American Indian and Alaska Native, 2.8 percent Asian, less than 0.1 percent Native Hawaiian and other Pacific Islander, 1.6 percent of some other race, and 1.6 percent of two or more races. 4.3 percent of the population was Hispanic or Latino.

There were 93,221 households, of which 29.9 percent were people living alone, 63.4 percent were families, and 6.7 percent were non-families with two or more people. 52.2 percent of households (or 82.4 percent of families) were married couples living together and 28.6 percent (or 45.1 percent) had their own children (persons under the age of 18) living with them. Of the 11.2 percent of households that had a householder with no spouse present, 44.4 percent were women living with their own children. The average household size was 2.33, and the average family size was 2.93.

The 50,632 children in the district were 23.0 percent of the total population, and 13,283 (6.0 percent) were under the age of 5; 13,605 (6.2 percent) were from 5 to 9; 14,874 (6.8 percent) were from 10 to 14; and 8,870 (4.0 percent) were from 15 to 17. 48.8 percent of the children were female. For 95.1 percent of the children in the district, the householder was the child's parent and 77.3 percent live in married-couple families, but 1.1 percent were not related to the householder. 21 householders or spouses were under the age of 18.

== See also ==
- Kansas State Department of Education
- Kansas State High School Activities Association
- List of high schools in Kansas
- List of unified school districts in Kansas
