= Overland Park, Kansas =

- City
- Flag Logo

- Location within Johnson County and Kansas
- Interactive map of Overland Park, Kansas
- Coordinates: 38°53′13″N 94°41′13″W
- Country: United States
- State: Kansas
- County: Johnson
- Incorporated: 1960

Government
  - Type: Mayor–Council
  - Mayor: Curt Skoog
  - City Manager: Lori Luther

Area
  - Total: 75.64 sq mi (195.91 km^{2})
  - Land: 75.18 sq mi (194.72 km^{2})
  - Water: 0.46 sq mi (1.19 km^{2})
- Elevation: 951 ft (290 m)

Population (2020)
  - Total: 197,238
  - Density: 2,623.5/sq mi (1,012.9/km^{2})
- Time zone: UTC-6 (CST)
  - Summer (DST): UTC-5 (CDT)
- ZIP Codes: 66204, 66207, 66210, 66212-66214, 66221, 66223-66224
- Area code: 913
- FIPS code: 20-53775
- GNIS ID: 485639
- Website: www.opkansas.gov

Overland Park (/ˈoʊvərlənd/ OH-vər-lənd) is a city in Johnson County, Kansas, United States. As of the 2020 census, the population of the city was 197,238. It is the largest city in Johnson County and the second-most populous city in the state of Kansas, also it is one of four principal cities in the Kansas City metropolitan area and the most populous suburb of Kansas City, Missouri.

== History ==
In 1905, William B. Strang Jr. arrived and began to plot subdivisions along an old military roadway, which later became the city's principal thoroughfare. He developed large portions of what would later become downtown Overland Park.

On May 20, 1960, Overland Park was officially incorporated as a "city of first class", with a population of 28,085. Less than thirty years later, the population had nearly quadrupled to 111,790 in 1990, increasing to 173,250 as of the 2010 census. Overland Park officially became the second largest city in the state, following Wichita, Kansas, after passing Kansas City, Kansas in the early 2000s.

Population growth in the city can mainly be attributed to the traditional greenfield suburban development, appreciated on the city's annexation map. Overland Park's last annexation attempt, in 2008, garnered widespread news coverage after massive outcry from affected residents. Overland Park now has a combined land area of 75.37 square miles (195.21 km^{2}) and spans nearly the full north–south length of Johnson County. Since the expansion of Overland Park, state legislators have amended laws governing annexations to require a majority vote of affected residents in all future annexations over 40 acres (0.16 km^{2}).

On April 13, 2014, a pair of shootings committed by a lone gunman occurred at the local Jewish Community Center of Greater Kansas City and Village Shalom, a local Jewish retirement community. A total of three people were killed in both shootings. The suspected gunman was described as a man in his seventies. He was later identified as Neo-Nazi agitator and perennial candidate Frazier Glenn Miller, Jr. He was convicted of the attack and sentenced to death, dying in prison of natural causes on May 3, 2021.

== Geography ==
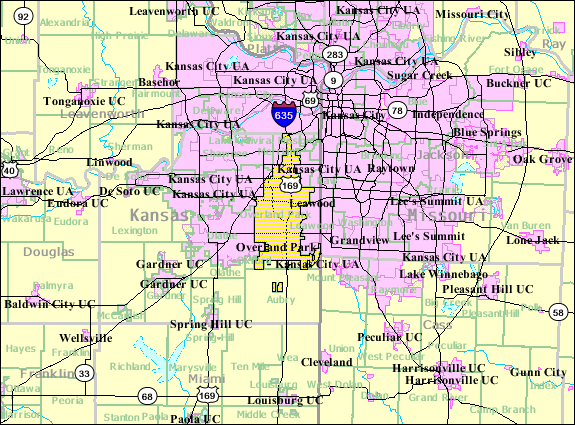
Location of Overland Park (in yellow) within the Kansas City metropolitan area

Overland Park is located in northeastern Kansas at the junction of Interstate 435 and U.S. Route 69 immediately east of Olathe, the county seat. The city center is roughly 13 miles (21 km) south-southwest of downtown Kansas City, Missouri.

The city lies on the northern edge of the Osage Plains, a few miles south of the Kansas River. One of the river's tributaries, Turkey Creek, flows northeastward through the extreme northern part of the city. South of Turkey Creek, the majority of the city lies in the watershed of the Blue River. Several of the river's tributaries run east-northeast across the city; from north to south, these include Indian Creek, Tomahawk Creek, and Negro Creek. In the far southern part of the city, two more tributaries, Coffee Creek and Wolf Creek, join to form the main stem of the Blue River itself.

According to the United States Census Bureau, the city has a total area of 75.37 square miles (195.21 km^{2}) of which 74.84 square miles (193.83 km^{2}) is land and 0.53 square mile (1.38 km^{2}) is water. [citation is ambiguous]

Overland Park is a principal city of the Kansas City metropolitan area, and it borders other communities on all sides. These include Kansas City, Kansas, to the north, Mission and Prairie Village to the northeast, Leawood to the east, Stilwell to the south, Olathe and Lenexa to the west, and Shawnee and Merriam to the northwest. Most of Overland Park, specifically the part of it lying north of 159th Street, lies within the area of Johnson County referred to as Shawnee Mission.

=== Climate ===
Overland Park lies in the transition zone between North America's humid subtropical climate and humid continental climate zones, typically experiencing hot, humid summers and cold, dry winters.

Climate data for Overland Park, Kansas
Month	Jan	Feb	Mar	Apr	May	Jun	Jul	Aug	Sep	Oct	Nov	Dec	Year
Record high °F (°C)	74 (23)	81 (27)	85 (29)	91 (33)	95 (35)	105 (41)	114 (46)	107 (42)	106 (41)	98 (37)	84 (29)	76 (24)	114 (46)
Mean daily maximum °F (°C)	38 (3)	45 (7)	56 (13)	67 (19)	76 (24)	84 (29)	89 (32)	88 (31)	80 (27)	69 (21)	54 (12)	42 (6)	66 (19)
Mean daily minimum °F (°C)	20 (−7)	25 (−4)	35 (2)	45 (7)	55 (13)	64 (18)	69 (21)	67 (19)	58 (14)	47 (8)	35 (2)	24 (−4)	45 (7)
Record low °F (°C)	−18 (−28)	−12 (−24)	−8 (−22)	13 (−11)	30 (−1)	43 (6)	48 (9)	46 (8)	30 (−1)	18 (−8)	1 (−17)	−22 (−30)	−22 (−30)
Average precipitation inches (mm)	1.26 (32)	1.27 (32)	2.74 (70)	3.78 (96)	5.41 (137)	5.22 (133)	4.03 (102)	3.56 (90)	4.69 (119)	3.48 (88)	2.97 (75)	1.76 (45)	40.17 (1,020)
Average snowfall inches (cm)	5.70 (14.5)	4.00 (10.2)	2.90 (7.4)	0.50 (1.3)	0 (0)	0 (0)	0 (0)	0 (0)	0 (0)	0.10 (0.25)	1.10 (2.8)	3.00 (7.6)	17.30 (43.9)

== Demographics ==
Historical population
Census	Pop.	Note	%±
1960	21,110		—
1970	76,623		263.0%
1980	81,784		6.7%
1990	111,790		36.7%
2000	149,080		33.4%
2010	173,372		16.3%
2020	197,238		13.8%
2025 (est.)	203,677		3.3%
U.S. Decennial Census; 2010-2020

=== 2020 census ===
Overland Park, Kansas – Racial and ethnic composition Note: the US Census treats Hispanic/Latino as an ethnic category. This table excludes Latinos from the racial categories and assigns them to a separate category. Hispanics/Latinos may be of any race.
Race / Ethnicity (NH = Non-Hispanic)	Pop 2000	Pop 2010	Pop 2020	% 2000	% 2010	% 2020
White alone (NH)	131,782	140,087	144,363	88.40%	80.80%	73.19%
Black or African American alone (NH)	3,729	7,357	8,854	2.50%	4.24%	4.49%
Native American alone (NH)	349	465	426	0.23%	0.27%	0.22%
Asian alone (NH)	5,687	10,846	18,311	3.81%	6.26%	9.28%
Pacific Islander alone (NH)	51	64	87	0.03%	0.04%	0.04%
Other race alone (NH)	126	262	825	0.08%	0.15%	0.42%
Mixed race or Multiracial (NH)	1,736	3,380	8,949	1.16%	1.95%	4.54%
Hispanic or Latino (any race)	5,620	10,911	15,423	3.77%	6.29%	7.82%
Total	149,080	173,372	197,238	100.00%	100.00%	100.00%

The U.S. Census accounts for race by two methodologies. "Race alone" and "Race alone less Hispanics" where Hispanics are delineated separately as if a separate race.

According to the 2020 United States census, the racial makeup (including Hispanics in the racial counts) was 75.04% (147,999) White alone, 4.60% (9,068) Black alone, 0.35% (694) Native American alone, 9.31% (18,368) Asian alone, 0.05% (101) Pacific Islander alone, 2.55% (5,037) Other Race alone, and 8.10% (15,971) Multiracial or Mixed Race.

According to the 2020 United States census, the racial and ethnic makeup (where Hispanics are excluded from the racial counts and placed in their own category) was 73.19% (144,363) White alone (non-Hispanic), 4.49% (8,854) Black alone (non-Hispanic), 0.22% (426) Native American alone (non-Hispanic), 9.28% (18,311) Asian alone (non-Hispanic), 0.04% (87) Pacific Islander alone (non-Hispanic), 0.42% (825) Other Race alone (non-Hispanic), 4.54% (8,949) Multiracial or Mixed Race (non-Hispanic), and 7.82% (15,423) Hispanic or Latino.

=== 2010 census ===
As of the 2010 United States census, there were 173,372 people, 71,443 households, and 45,516 families residing in the city. The population density was 2,316.5 inhabitants per square mile (894.4/km^{2}). There were 76,280 housing units at an average density of 1,019.2 per square mile (393.5/km^{2}). The racial makeup of the city was 84.4% White, 4.3% African American, 0.3% American Indian, 6.3% Asian, 2.1% from other races, and 2.5% from two or more races. Hispanics and Latinos of any race were 6.3% of the population.

There were 71,443 households, of which 30.6% had children under the age of 18 living with them, 52.0% were married couples living together, 8.4% had a female householder with no husband present, 3.2% had a male householder with no wife present, and 36.3% were non-families. 29.8% of all households were made up of individuals, and 8.7% had someone living alone who was 65 years of age or older. The average household size was 2.41, and the average family size was 3.04.

The median age in the city was 37.8 years. 24.7% of residents were under the age of 18; 7.4% were between the ages of 18 and 24; 28.2% were from 25 to 44; 27.6% were from 45 to 64; and 12.3% were 65 years of age or older. The gender makeup of the city was 48.3% male and 51.7% female.

The median income for a household in the city was $71,513, and the median income for a family was $93,293. Males had a median income of $65,210 versus $43,413 for females. The per capita income for the city was $39,319. 4.9% of the population and 3.3% of families were living below the poverty line, including 6.5% of those under the age of 18 and 4.9% of those 65 and older.

=== Metropolitan area ===
Overland Park is the most populous suburb of Kansas City, Missouri. It has a lower detached single family housing rate than Kansas City and has more people commuting into it than out making its daytime population 235,000. It is a principal city of both the Kansas City, MO–KS Metropolitan Statistical Area and the Kansas City–Overland Park–Kansas City, MO–KS Combined Statistical Area.

== Economy ==
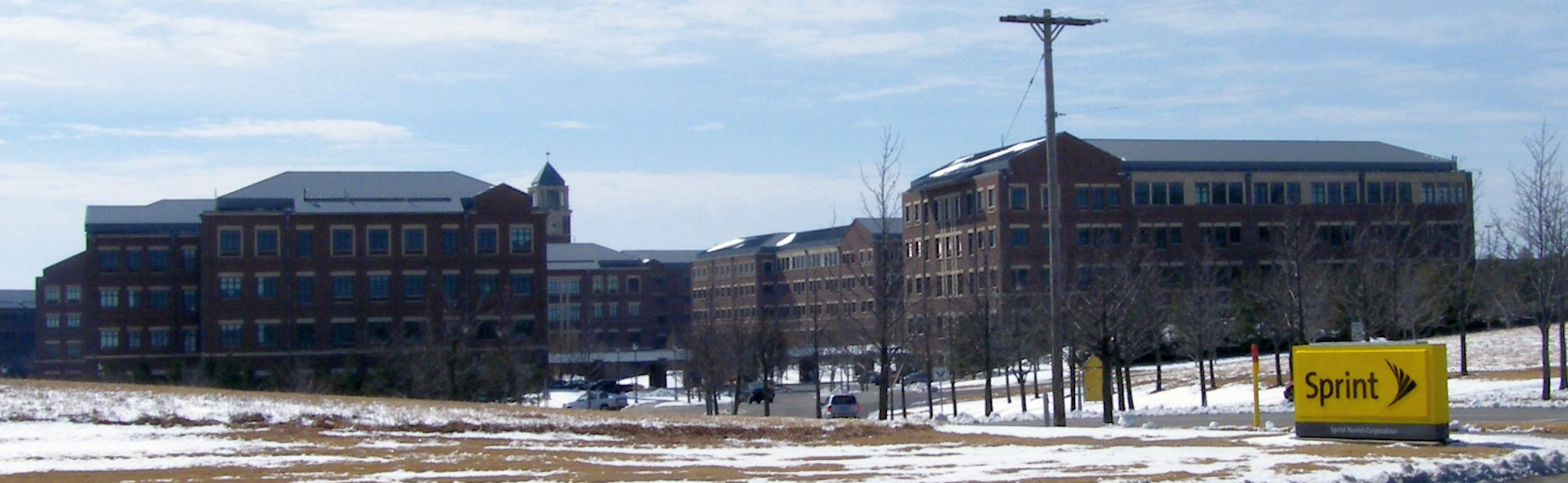
Aspiria Office Complex (2009)

The service sector constitutes most of the local economy. Health care, retail trade, professional and technical services, finance and insurance, and information technology are the city's five largest industries. Companies with headquarters in the city include Black & Veatch, Ash Grove Cement Company, and Compass Minerals. The city seeks to attract technology companies in particular, such as Netsmart Technologies which relocated its headquarters there in 2011. Restaurant chain Applebee's was headquartered in the city from 1993 to 2007. It is also home to the Overland Park Xchange building, the 3rd largest office building in the Kansas City Metropolitan Area totalling 735,000 square feet of office space.

As of 2014, 71.8% of the population over the age of 16 was in the labor force. 0.1% was in the armed forces, and 71.7% was in the civilian labor force with 68.1% being employed and 3.7% unemployed. The composition, by occupation, of the employed civilian labor force was: 53.0% in management, business, science, and arts; 26.2% in sales and office occupations; 11.3% in service occupations; 4.0% in natural resources, construction, and maintenance; 5.5% in production, transportation, and material moving. The three industries employing the largest percentages of the working civilian labor force were: educational services, health care, and social assistance (22.5%); professional, scientific, management, administrative, and waste management services (17.4%); and retail trade (10.7%). T-Mobile (former Sprint headquarters) is the largest employer in the city followed by Shawnee Mission School District, Johnson County Community College, Blue Valley School District, Black & Veatch, OptumRx, the City of Overland Park, Yellow Corporation, Overland Park Regional Medical Center, and Waddell & Reed.

The cost of living in Overland Park is below average; compared to a U.S. average of 100, the cost of living index for the city is 88.2. As of 2014, the median home value in the city was $225,000, the median selected monthly owner cost was $1,712 for housing units with a mortgage and $570 for those without, and the median gross rent was $974.

It was home to the Sprint Corporation before its merger with T-Mobile in 2020. Part of its former corporate campus was sold in 2019 to a firm named Occidental Management. Telephone company Embarq formerly had its national headquarters in Overland Park before its acquisition by CenturyTel in 2009; the company still employs several hundred people in Gardner.

=== Top employers ===
According to the city's 2016 Comprehensive Annual Financial Report, the top employers in the city are:

#	Employer	# of Employees
1	T-Mobile	6,300
2	Shawnee Mission School District	3,974
3	Blue Valley School District	3,313
4	Black & Veatch Engineering Consultants	2,649
5	Johnson County Community College	2,377
6	OptumRx	2,000
7	Waddell & Reed Financial	1,350
8	Overland Park Regional Medical Center	1,200
9	City of Overland Park	1,142
10	Empower Retirement	1,000

== Government ==
Under state statute, Overland Park is a city of the first class. Since 1963, it has had a mayor-council-manager form of government. The city council consists of 13 members popularly elected every four years with staggered terms in office. For representative purposes, the city is divided into six wards with two members elected from each ward. The mayor is the 13th member, elected at-large. The council sets policy for the city, annually identifies city priorities for the Kansas Legislature and the United States Congress, and authorizes ordinances, resolutions, contracts, and agreements. The council meets on the first and third Monday of each month. The mayor presides over council meetings, appoints members to resident boards and commissions, meets with constituents, and signs ordinances, resolutions, contracts, and agreements authorized by the council. The city manager administers city operations and implements policies set by the city council.

Overland Park lies within Kansas's 3rd U.S. Congressional District, which is represented by Sharice Davids. For the purposes of representation in the Kansas Legislature, the city is located in the 6th through 8th, 10th, 11th, 21st, and 37th districts of the Kansas Senate and the 8th, 16th, 19th through 24th, 27th through 29th, and 48th districts of the Kansas House of Representatives.

=== Law enforcement ===
The Overland Park Police Department is the main agency to patrol all of Overland Park with the Johnson County Sheriff's Office also assisting with serving papers and other court documents to people who work in the city as well as patrolling the unincorporated parts of the county and other cities in the county. OPPD has 310 full-time employees and 255 commissioned officers. On October 14, 2024, Doreen Jokerst was sworn in as the department's first female police chief.

The Kansas Highway Patrol tends to patrol the various interstates running through the city including Interstate 35 which runs through Overland Park along with U.S. Route 69 which runs through Overland Park and Interstate 635 on the Overland Park section being the main highways patrolled by KHP in Overland Park. However the KHP also does assist OPPD in instances such as car chases, traffic stops and other instances of officer needs assistance calls.

== Education ==
=== Primary and secondary education ===
Overland Park spans four public school districts. The portion of the city north of Interstate 435 lies within the Shawnee Mission School District (SMSD). SMSD, which is headquartered in Overland Park, operates thirty eight elementary schools, two middle schools, six high schools, and multiple support facilities in the city. Most of the city south of I-435 lies within the Blue Valley School District. Blue Valley, also based in Overland Park, operates 20 elementary schools, nine middle schools, five high schools, and one alternative high school in the city. A portion of western Overland Park lies within the Olathe Public Schools district which operates two elementary schools in the city. The extreme southwestern part of Overland Park lies within the Spring Hill School District.

There are more than 12 private and parochial schools in Overland Park. The Roman Catholic Archdiocese of Kansas City in Kansas oversees five Catholic schools in the city including four elementary schools and Saint Thomas Aquinas High School. The Lutheran Church–Missouri Synod oversees two schools, Bethany Lutheran School (Grades K–8) and Christ Lutheran School (K–8). The Wisconsin Evangelical Lutheran Synod oversees a third Lutheran school, Mount Olive Lutheran School (K–8). Other Christian schools in the city are Kansas City Christian School's Oxford Park Campus (PK–2) and Overland Christian Schools (PK–12). Overland Park also hosts one Jewish school, Hyman Brand Hebrew Academy (K–12). Non-religious private schools in the city include Accelerated Schools of Overland Park (4–12) and two Montessori schools.

Kansas City Japanese School, a Japanese weekend educational program, is held at the Kansas Christian College in Overland Park.

K–12 schools:

- Blue Valley USD 229
- Shawnee Mission School District
- Olathe USD 233
- Spring Hill Schools
- Saint Thomas Aquinas High School
- Ascension Catholic School
- Bethany Lutheran
- John Paul the Second
- Oxford Campus Kansas City Christian
- Overland Christian
- Mt. Olive
- Hyman Brand Hebrew Academy
- Holy Spirit
- Holy Cross
- Christ Lutheran
- Horizon Academy

=== Colleges and universities ===
- Cleveland University-Kansas City (formerly Cleveland Chiropractic College)
- Ottawa University – adult campus
- University of Kansas Edwards Campus
- Johnson County Community College
- Baker University – satellite campus
- Emporia State University – satellite campus
- Kansas Christian College
- Rasmussen College

The Accreditation Council for Business Schools and Programs is based in Overland Park; its competitive peer, the International Assembly for Collegiate Business Education, is based in neighboring Lenexa.

=== Libraries ===
The Johnson County Library serves the county with 14 locations, three are in Overland Park (Blue Valley, Central Resource, and Oak Park). There are more than about 14 locations. The first library started in the early 1950s.The county partnered with other agencies; such as the Department of health. They have a volunteer program, access to magazines, and offer opportunities to learn new languages and more.

== Infrastructure ==
=== Transportation ===
Interstate 435, the Kansas City area's beltway, and U.S. Route 50 run concurrently east–west through central Overland Park. Interstate 35 runs northeast–southwest through the city's northwestern and northern fringe. U.S. Route 56 and U.S. Route 169 run concurrently with I-35 through the city's northwestern fringe and then split off to the east as Shawnee Mission Parkway at interchange 226, running east–west through northern Overland Park. U.S. Route 69 runs generally north–south through the city, merging with I-35, U.S. 56, and U.S. 169 at interchange 225 just northwest of the city. U.S. 69 then splits off to the east with U.S. 56 and U.S. 169 as Shawnee Mission Parkway before turning north again as Metcalf Avenue. In extreme northern Overland Park, U.S. 69 then re-merges with I-35. Metcalf Avenue continues north out of the city as Interstate 635.

Johnson County Transit, also known as "The JO", provides public transportation via multiple bus routes throughout the city. Several of these routes connect Overland Park with other suburbs and downtown Kansas City, Missouri.

Kansas City International Airport is located approximately 22 mi (35 km) north of central Overland Park. Johnson County Executive Airport, a public general aviation facility, is located immediately west of the city in Olathe.

BNSF Railway and Union Pacific Railroad each operate a freight rail line through Overland Park. The BNSF line runs roughly parallel with I-35 through the northwestern and northern fringe of the city. The Union Pacific line runs northeast through the extreme southeastern part of the city. Kansas City's Union Station, which is a stop on Amtrak's Missouri River Runner and Southwest Chief passenger rail lines, is located approximately 8 mi (13 km) northeast of central Overland Park.

=== Utilities ===
Evergy (formerly Kansas City Power and Light (KCP&L)) provides electric power. Google Fiber, AT&T, Spectrum, and Consolidated Communications offer cable television, landline telephone, and broadband internet service. Local residents predominantly use natural gas for heating fuel; utility gas service is provided by Atmos Energy and Kansas Gas Service. WaterOne, an independent public utility, oversees water provision, distribution, and infrastructure maintenance. The Johnson County Wastewater department manages waste water collection, transportation, and treatment. Multiple privately owned trash haulers, evaluated and given permits by the city government, offer trash removal and recycling service.

=== Health care ===
Hospitals in Overland Park include AdventHealth South Overland Park, Menorah Medical Center, Overland Park Regional Medical Center and Saint Luke's South Hospital.

== Media ==
The Kansas City Star, Kansas City's main daily newspaper, provides coverage of local news and publishes an edition specific to Johnson County. In addition, two newspapers are published in Overland Park: the Campus Ledger, the bi-weekly Johnson County Community College student newspaper, and Kansas City Nursing News, a weekly trade publication.

Overland Park is in both the Kansas City radio and television markets. One radio station broadcasts from Overland Park: KCCV. It broadcasts on both 760 AM and 92.3 FM, playing a Religious format. KCCV is the flagship station of the Bott Radio Network (BRN), a network of Christian radio stations which is headquartered in Overland Park.

== Parks and recreation ==
Overland Park has more than 1,800 acres (7.3 km^{2}) of park land and open space. The city's 84 parks offer public golf, sand volleyball, hiking and biking trails, playgrounds, tennis courts, basketball courts, and reservable shelters.

== Culture ==
=== Points of interest ===
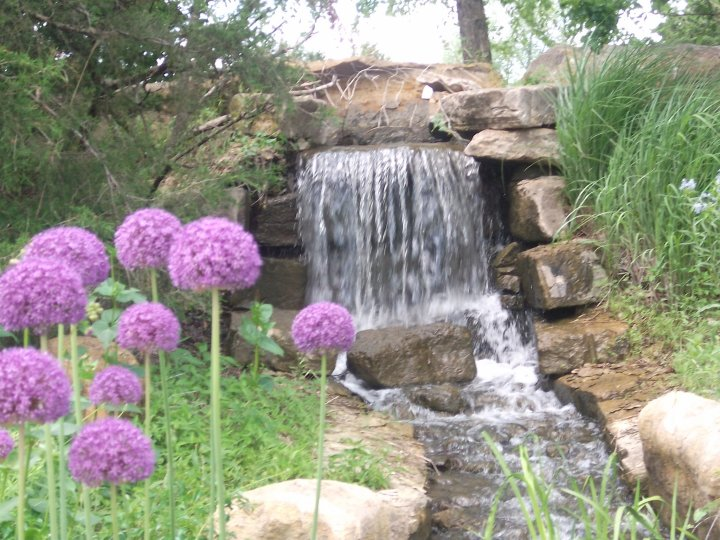
Overland Park Arboretum and Botanical Gardens

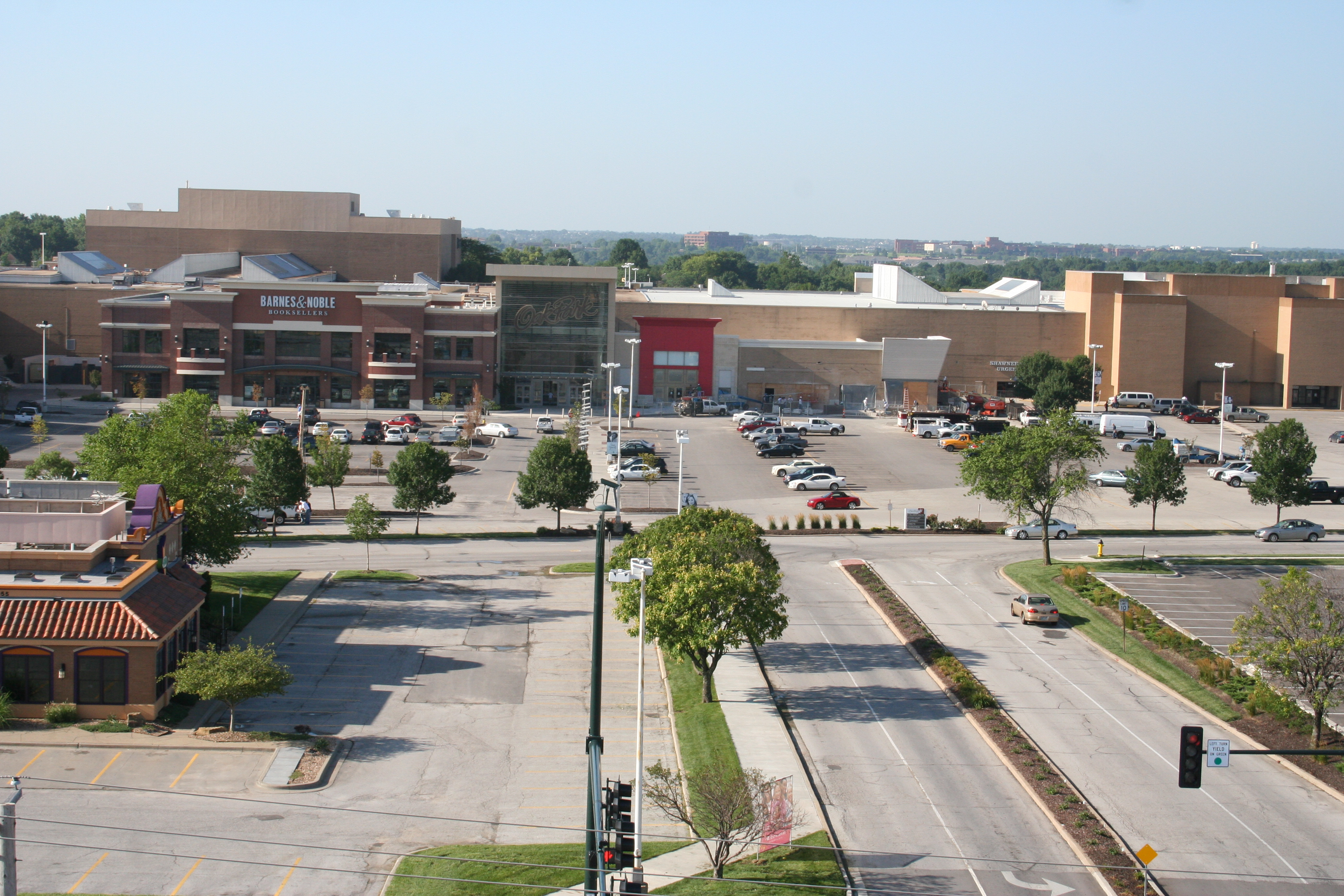
Oak Park Mall

The Overland Park Arboretum and Botanical Gardens is 300 acres (120 ha). The Oak Park Mall is one of the area's top shopping locations with nearly 200 stores.

The Johnson County Arts and Heritage Center houses the Johnson County Museum, KidScape, resident theatre company Theatre in the Park, a fine arts program, an emerging arts program, and the Overland Park Historical Society.

The Deanna Rose Children's Farmstead is a 12-acre (49,000 m^{2}) farm with animals, hay rides, a fishing pond, a dairy barn, an early 1900s school house, and a children's gold mining camp.

The Overland Park Golf Division operates two public golf courses: St. Andrews Golf Club and the Sykes Lady Golf Club. These courses host more than 130,000 rounds of golf a year.

Scheels Overland Park Soccer Complex was named the top soccer facility in the nation by Livability because it is considered the only complex of its kind in the United States. It covers 96 acres (39 ha) and offers 12 lighted, regulation size synthetic, turf fields with a cooling system to control turf temperature on hot days.

The city is also home to Overland Park Convention Center.

In 2015, Topgolf driving range and entertainment complex opened in Overland Park. It offers a driving range, bar, and restaurant complex, and employs more than 450 people.

Historic Downtown Overland Park contains a farmers' market, the clocktower plaza and a statue of Overland Park City founder William B. Strang Jr. It also hosts the Strang Carriage House and is home to the Overland Park Historical Society.

The Nerman Museum of Contemporary Art is on the campus of Johnson County Community College.

The city has numerous public art works installed under the Public Art Program.

There are two community centers in the city: Matt Ross Community Center and Tomahawk Ridge Community Center.

=== Religion ===
Overland Park is highly populated by Protestants, reflective of the overall population of the state of Kansas. Large Baptist, Methodist, Nazarene and Pentecostal churches dot the landscape of Overland Park as well as its neighboring suburbs. Also, Overland Park is home to a significant number of Roman Catholics. Overland Park falls within the boundaries of the Archdiocese of Kansas City in Kansas. Parishes such as St. Michael the Archangel, Holy Cross, Holy Spirit, Ascension and Queen of the Holy Rosary serve Catholics in Overland Park. Holy Cross offers a Spanish mass for the Hispanic community in the city.

Overland Park is also served by a number of synagogues: Congregation Beth Israel Abraham Voliner, an Orthodox synagogue established in Kansas City, Missouri, in 1894. Other Orthodox synagogues include the Chabad House Center which serves as the Chabad Headquarters for Kansas and Missouri, and the Torah Learning Center. There are several other synagogues, too, including Kehilath Israel, Congregation Beth Torah, and The Temple, Congregation B'nai Jehudah.

Overland Park is also home to a relatively small Muslim population. The Islamic Center of Johnson County serves as a mosque and a community center for Muslims in Overland Park. There is also a growing Hindu, Sikh, and Buddhist population in Overland Park and surrounding areas.

=== In popular culture ===
Overland Park is the setting of the 2008 documentary series High School Confidential, the 2009–2011 television series, United States of Tara, and the web series The Most Popular Girls in School.

== Notable people ==
People who were born in, or have lived in, Overland Park include film directors Michael Almereyda (Hamlet) and Darren Lynn Bousman (Saw), actors Rob Riggle, Tom Kane, Paul Rudd, Jason Sudeikis, Sarah Lancaster, John Lehr, David Dastmalchian, eSports player Johnathan Wendel, and musician couple Waxahatchee and Kevin Morby and Musician Lajon Witherspoon.

== Sister cities ==
Overland Park has one sister city.

- Bietigheim-Bissingen, Baden-Württemberg, Germany
