= Kansas City metropolitan area =

Kansas City Metropolitan Area
- Metropolitan Statistical Area
- Kansas City, MO–KS MSA
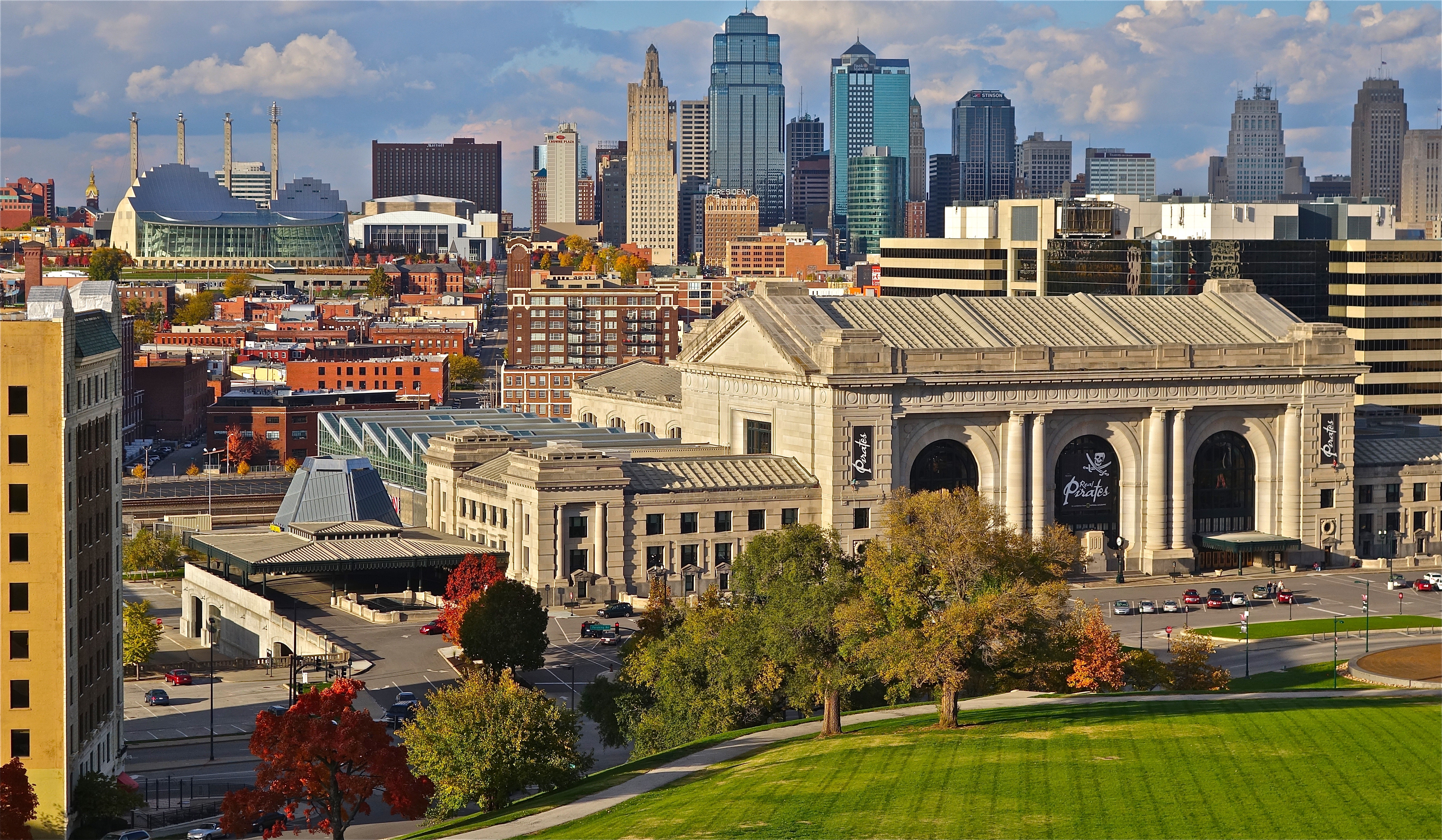
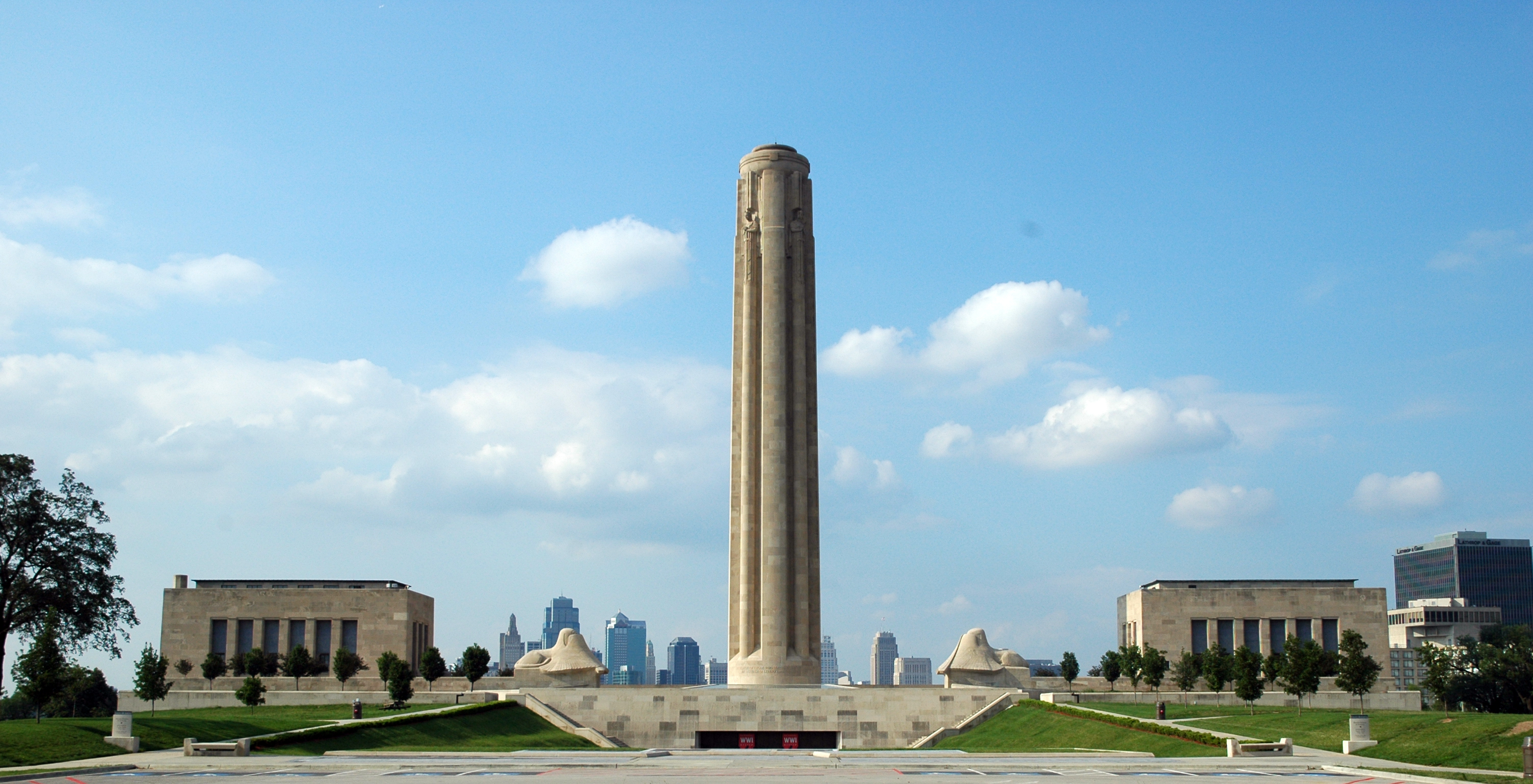
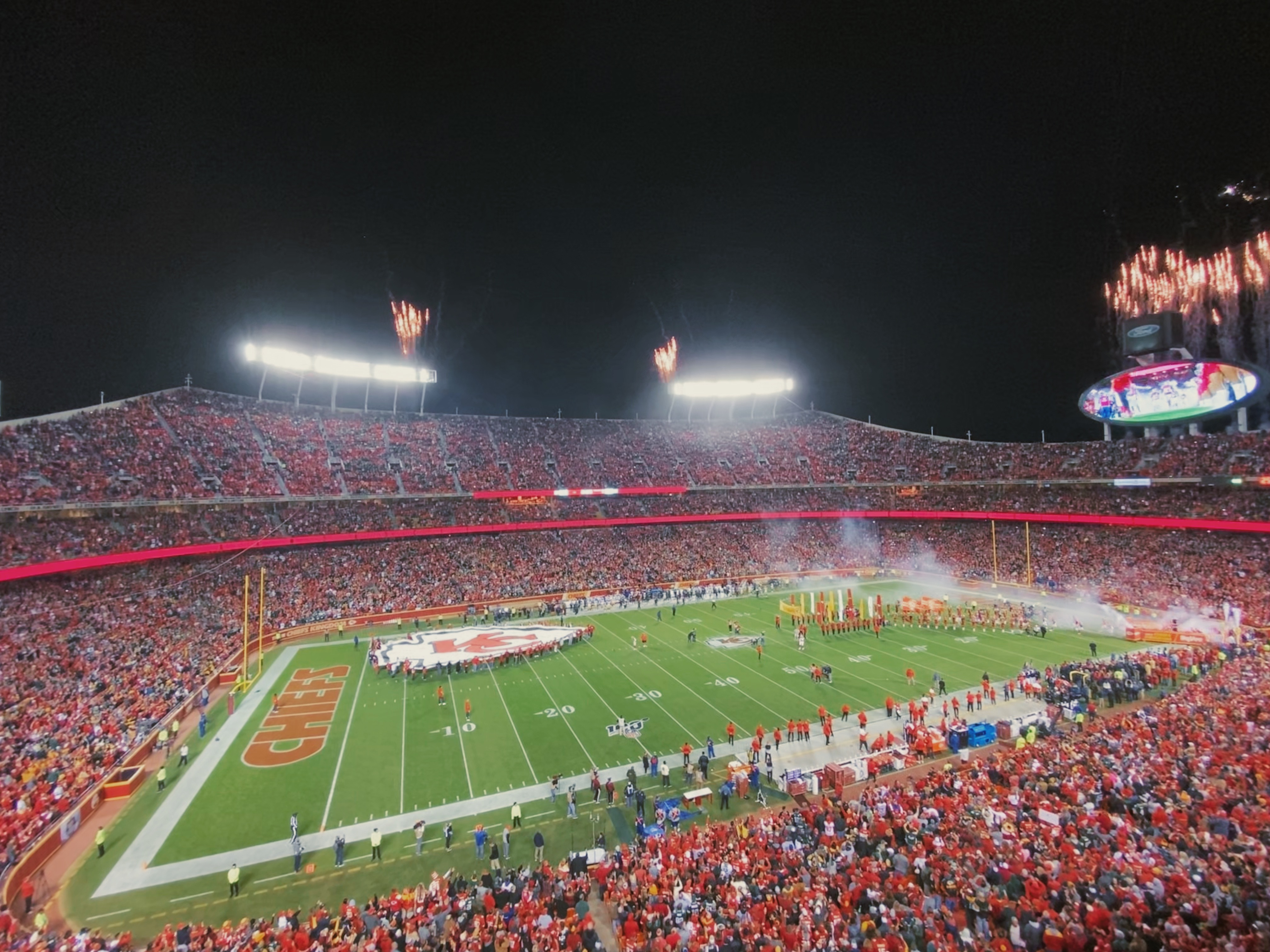
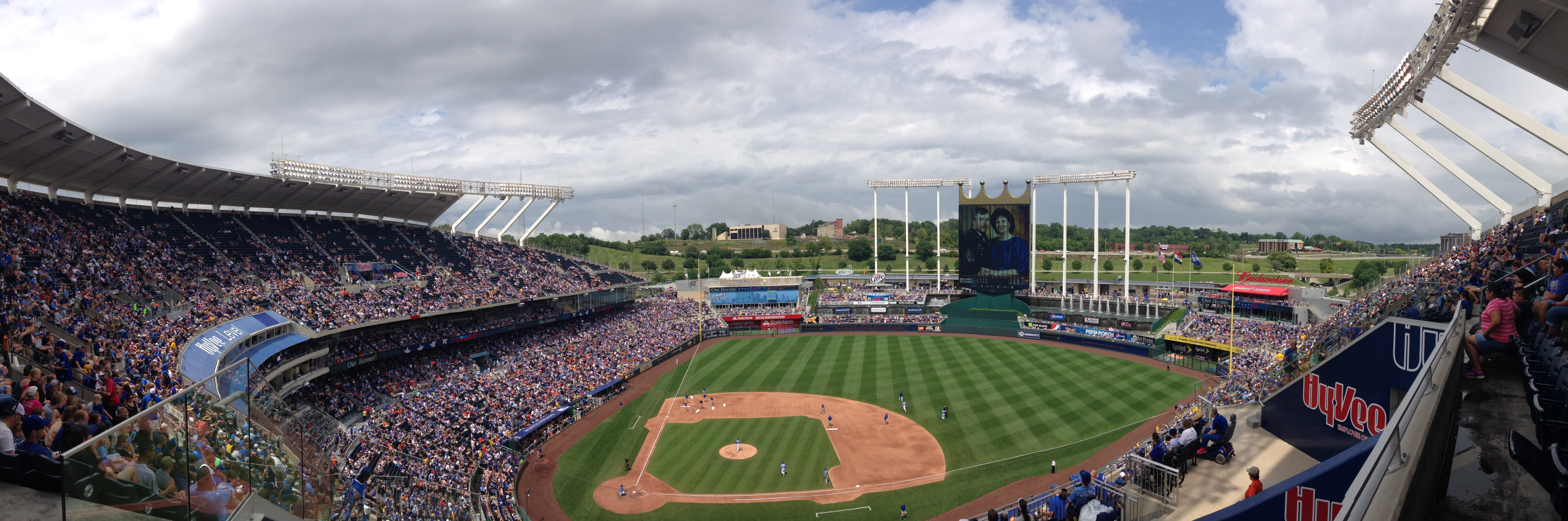
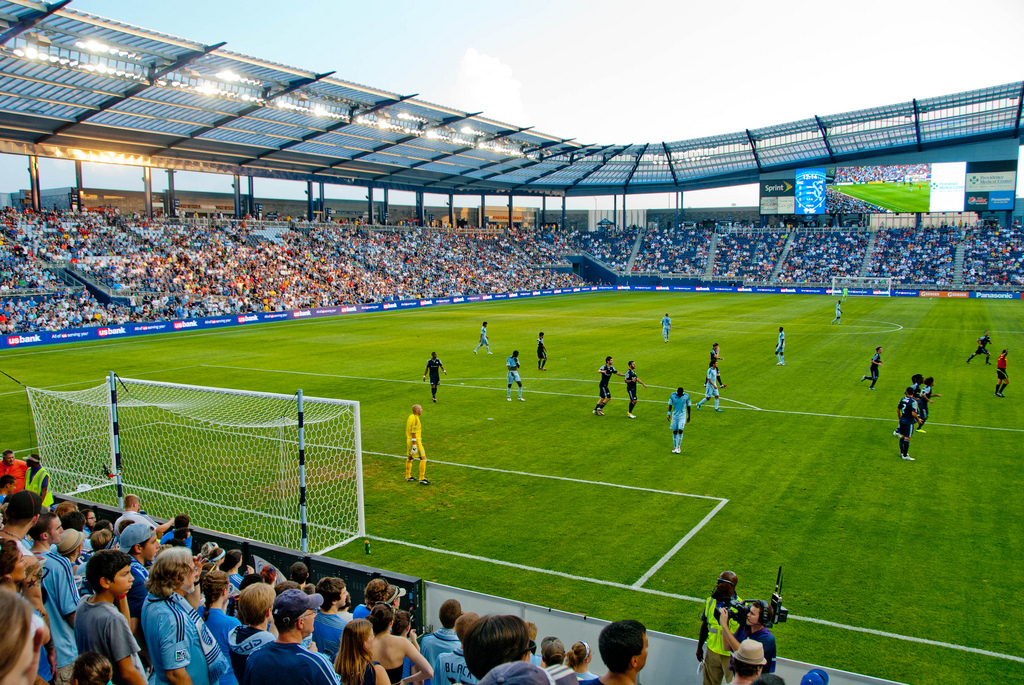
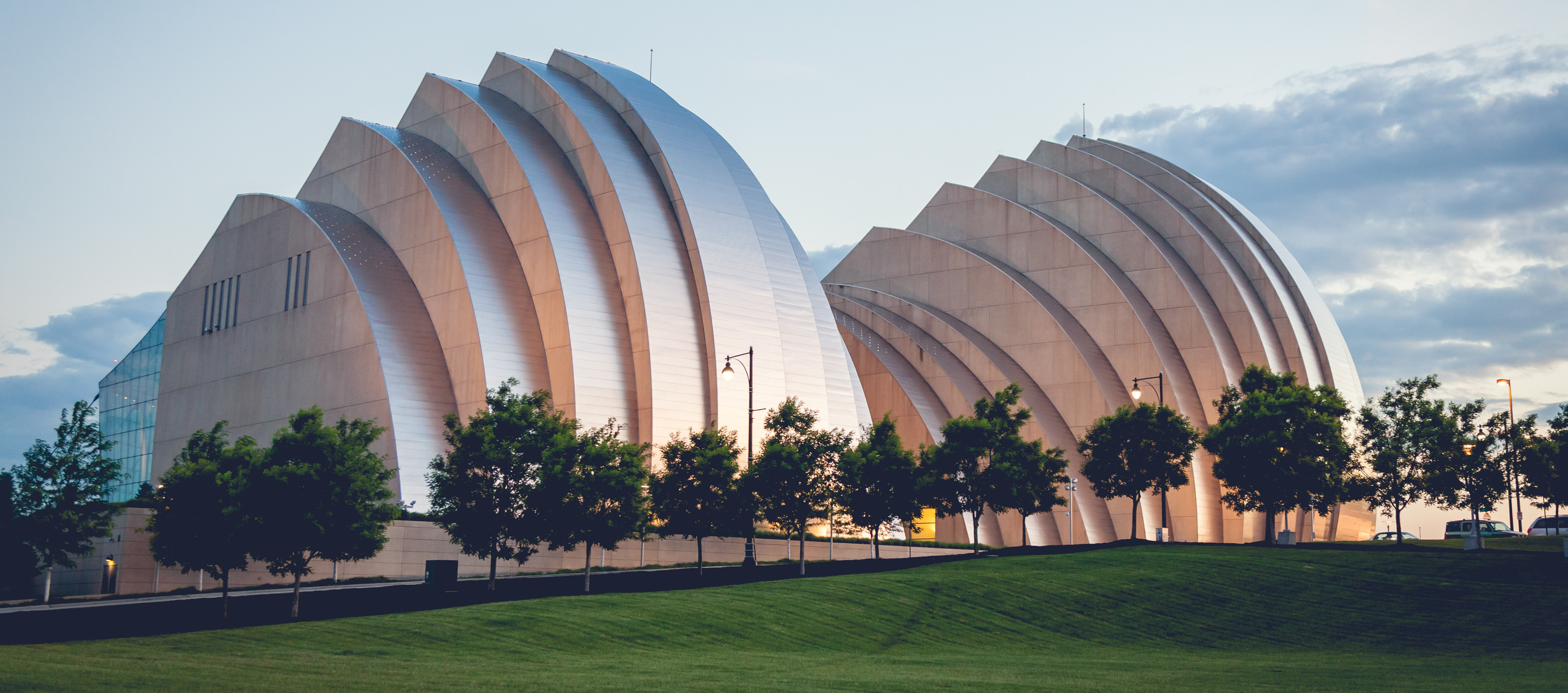
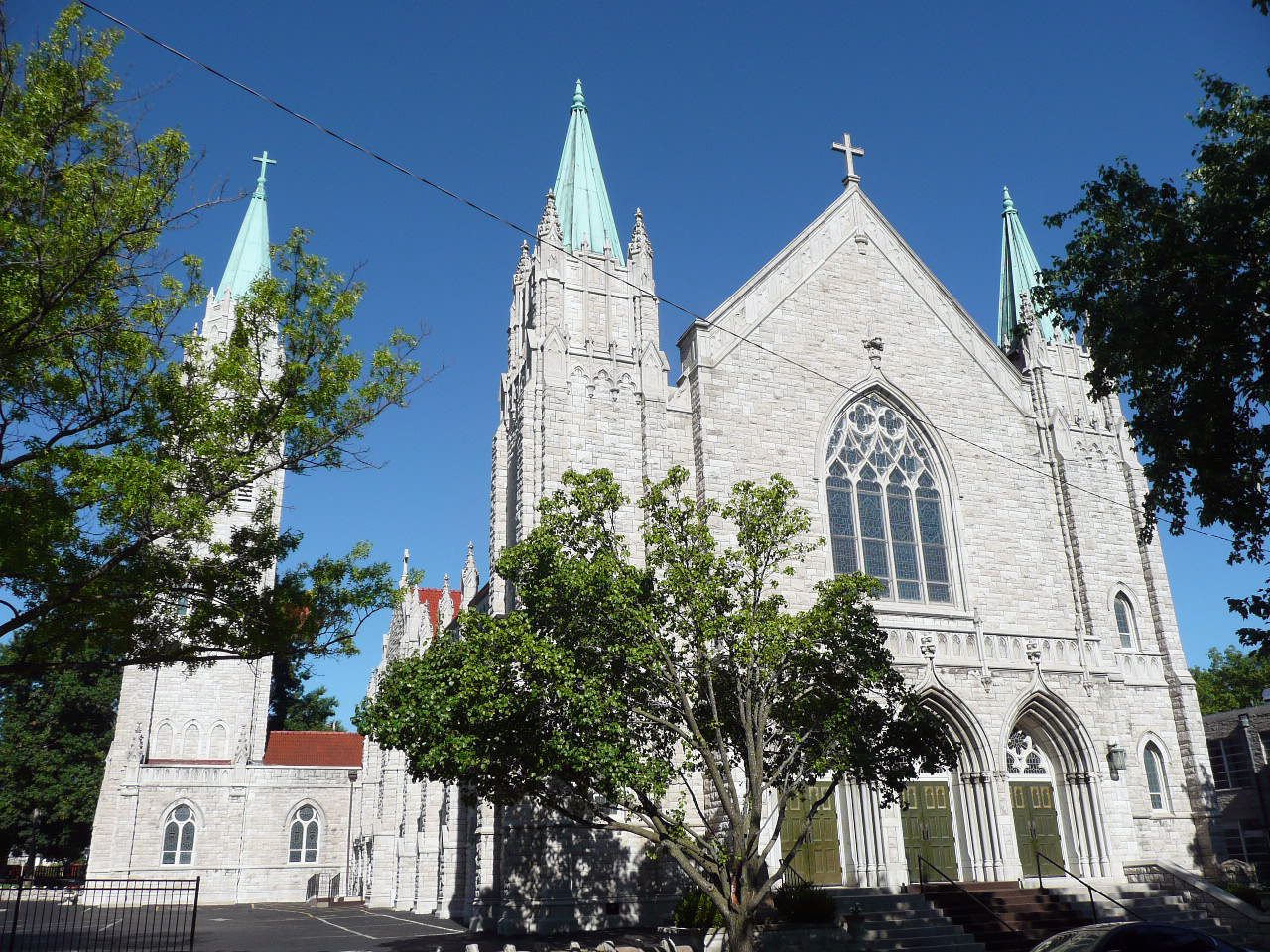
- Downtown Kansas City The World War I Liberty Memorial Arrowhead Stadium Kauffman Stadium Sporting Park in Kansas City, Kansas Kauffman Center for the Performing Arts The Cathedral of Saint Peter, Kansas City, Kansas
Interactive Map of the Kansas City–Overland Park–Kansas City, MO–KS CSA
Kansas City, Missouri
Kansas City, Kansas
Kansas City, MO–KS MSA
Lawrence, KS MSA
St. Joseph, MO–KS MSA
Warrensburg, MO µSA
Ottawa, KS µSA
Atchison, KS µSA
- Coordinates: 39°06′N 94°35′W
- Country: United States
- State: Missouri and Kansas
- Largest city: Kansas City, Missouri
- Cities with population over 50,000: - Overland Park, Kansas; - Kansas City, Kansas; - Independence, Missouri; - Olathe, Kansas; - Lee's Summit, Missouri; - Shawnee, Kansas; - Blue Springs, Missouri; - Lenexa, Kansas

Area
  - Total: 8,472 sq mi (21,940 km^{2})
- Highest elevation: 1,160 ft (353.5 m)
- Lowest elevation: 690 ft (210.3 m)

Population (2025)
  - MSA: 2,270,682 (31st)
  - MSA density: 268/sq mi (103/km^{2})
  - CSA: 2,609,913 (29th)

GDP
  - MSA: $169.5 billion (2022)
- Time zone: UTC−06:00 (CST)
  - Summer (DST): UTC−05:00 (CDT)

The Kansas City metropolitan area is a bi-state metropolitan area anchored by Kansas City, Missouri. Its fourteen counties straddle the border between the U.S. states of Missouri (nine counties) and Kansas (five counties). The 8,472 square miles (21,940 km^{2}) 2024 estimated census calculated a population of more than 2.2 million people, it is the second-largest metropolitan area centered in Missouri (after Greater St. Louis) and is the largest metropolitan area in Kansas, though Wichita is the largest metropolitan area centered in Kansas. Alongside Kansas City, Missouri, these are the suburbs with populations above 100,000: Overland Park, Kansas; Kansas City, Kansas; Olathe, Kansas; Independence, Missouri; and Lee's Summit, Missouri.

Cultural attractions include the American Jazz Museum, the Kansas City Symphony, Kansas City Union Station, the National World War I Museum, the Nelson-Atkins Museum of Art, the Kemper Museum of Contemporary Art, Kauffman Center for the Performing Arts, the National Agricultural Center and Hall of Fame, Negro Leagues Baseball Museum, Arabia Steamboat Museum, Uptown Theater, Midland Theatre, the Kansas City Zoo, Swope Park (featuring Starlight Theater), Sandstone Amphitheater, the Kansas City Renaissance Festival, Worlds of Fun, Oceans of Fun, the College Basketball Experience, the NWSL’s Kansas City Current, and several casinos. Major league sports franchises include the NFL's Kansas City Chiefs, the MLB's Kansas City Royals, and the MLS's Sporting Kansas City. The Kansas Speedway is owned by NASCAR.

Historic features include the confluence of the eastern endpoints of the California, Santa Fe, and Oregon Trails in Independence; the Harry S. Truman Historic District; and the neighborhoods of Westport, 18th and Vine, and Pendleton Heights. Historic cultural origins include KC styles of jazz, vaudeville theater, barbecue, and steak.

== Geographic overview ==
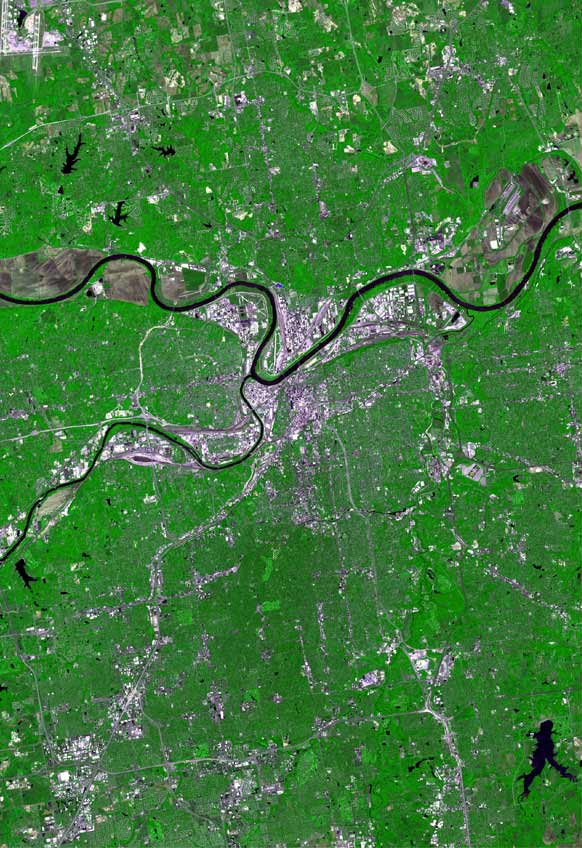
On a Kansas City satellite map, the larger Missouri River runs west to east, joined at Kaw Point by the much smaller Kansas River approaching from the southwest. Downtown Kansas City, Missouri, is immediately southeast of their confluence and North Kansas City, Missouri, is to its northeast.

The larger Kansas City metropolitan area can be visualized as an area with roughly four quadrants:

The southeast quadrant includes Kansas City, Missouri, and surrounding areas in Missouri. It includes the Grandview Triangle.

The southwest quadrant includes all of Johnson County, Kansas, which includes the towns in the area known as Shawnee Mission, Kansas. Interstate 35 runs diagonally through Johnson County, Kansas, from the southwest to Downtown Kansas City, Missouri.

The northwest quadrant contains Wyandotte, and Leavenworth, counties in Kansas and parts of Platte County, Missouri. Wyandotte County, Kansas (sometimes referred to as just Wyandotte), contains Kansas City, Kansas; Bonner Springs, Kansas; and Edwardsville, Kansas; it is governed by a single unified government. Another bend in the Missouri River forms the county line between Wyandotte County, Kansas, and Platte County, Missouri, to the north and northeast.

The map's northeast quadrant is referred to as the Northland. It includes parts of Clay County, Missouri, including North Kansas City, Missouri and Parkville, Missouri. North Kansas City is bounded by a bend in the Missouri River that defines a border between Wyandotte County, Kansas, and Clay County, Missouri, running approximately north–south and a border between North Kansas City, Missouri, and Kansas City, Missouri, running approximately east–west. The river bend's sharpest part forms a peninsula containing the Kansas City Downtown Airport.

== Divisions ==
=== Areas ===
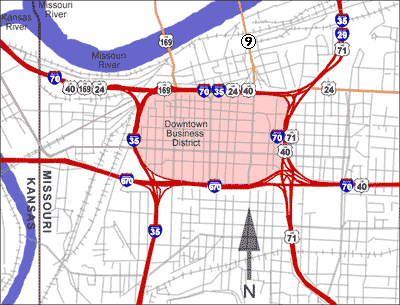
The center of Kansas City is roughly contained inside the downtown loop (shaded in red).

- Downtown Kansas City is a section of western Kansas City, Missouri, where corporate offices and much of the city's entertainment facilities are located. The area has been undergoing a massive revitalization since 2000, and increased its population by over 7,000 people between 2000 and 2005. The Power and Light District, Historic Garment District, and the T-Mobile Center are in the downtown area.
- The Northland is a section of the metropolitan area north of the Missouri River, comprising Clay and Platte Counties in Missouri. This area includes the northern half of Kansas City, Missouri, which is referred to as Kansas City, North to distinguish it from the rest of the Northland and the city of North Kansas City.
- River Market is an area north of downtown, south of the Missouri River and west of Highway 9, and is home to a large farmer's market.
- North Kansas City is an enclaved city surrounded by Kansas City, Missouri.
- Shawnee Mission is a district created by the United States Postal Service that encompasses 16 cities and towns in northeast Johnson County, Kansas, most of which also lie in the school district of the same name.
- The Waldo Residential District (Waldo) is in Kansas City, Missouri, near 75th Street and Wornall Road.
- Country Club Plaza ("the Plaza") is an upscale shopping district built by the J.C. Nichols Company in 1923, and was the first suburban shopping district in the United States.
- The Country Club District is an associated group of neighborhoods built along Ward Parkway by J.C. Nichols, which is just south of the Country Club Plaza and includes Sunset Hill, Brookside, Crestwood, and Mission Hills, Kansas.
- 39th Street (also referred to as the Volker neighborhood or "Restaurant Row") is a small section of West 39th Street between State Line Road and the Southwest Trafficway in Kansas City, Missouri. The area has many restaurants, bars and shops, and is just across the state line from the University of Kansas Medical Center.
- University of Kansas Hospital (KUMED) is the corporate name of the hospital on the KU Medical Center campus.
- Benton Curve is a curve at the cross-section of Interstate 70 and Benton Boulevard in Kansas City, Missouri; the area has long been prone to traffic accidents.
- Pendleton Heights is a neighborhood in the Historic Northeast district of Kansas City, Missouri, which is bordered by Cliff Drive to the north, Chestnut Trafficway to the east, Independence Avenue to the south, and The Paseo to the west. It is Kansas City's oldest surviving neighborhood, and has the city's largest concentration of Victorian homes.
- The Grandview Triangle is the intersection of four major highways: Interstate 435, Interstate 470, Interstate 49, and U.S. Route 71 (Bruce R. Watkins Drive). Notorious for fatal accidents, the Triangle has undergone improvements and upgrades in recent years.
- Emanuel Cleaver II Boulevard, named for former mayor and current Congressman Emanuel Cleaver, comprises recently renamed portions of 47th Street and Brush Creek Boulevard in Kansas City, Missouri.
- 18th and Vine Historic District (18th and Vine) is a neighborhood on Kansas City, Missouri's north side that contains the Negro Leagues Baseball Museum and the American Jazz Museum. This area was the heart of Kansas City's black business district.
- The Library District is a recently defined district around the new Central Library at 14 West 10th Street in Kansas City, Missouri.
- 135th Street (Overland Park, Kansas) is a shopping area featuring several indoor and outlet malls, restaurants, and two movie theaters.
- Prariefire is a modern shopping and leisure area featuring fine restaurants and a high-end bowling venue. The Museum of Prariefire is its main attraction.
- Strawberry Hill is a historical area in Kansas City, Kansas that was home to many eastern European immigrants. Later, the neighborhood became home to many Latino and Latino families.
- Hospital Hill is an area near 23rd Street and Holmes Avenue in Kansas City, Missouri, and consists of two major hospitals (University Health and the Children's Mercy Hospital) and the University of Missouri-Kansas City's School of Medicine, School of Dentistry, School of Pharmacy, and School of Nursing.
- Argentine is a neighborhood in Kansas City, Kansas, centered along Metropolitan and Strong avenues from 27th to 30th streets. It is one of the oldest Mexican/Latino neighborhoods in Kansas City, with Mexican immigration to that area starting in the 1800s.
- The Crossroads Arts District is a neighborhood in the downtown area between the Central Business District and Union Station, centered around the intersection of 19th Street and Baltimore Avenue in Kansas City, Missouri. It contains dozens of art galleries, and is considered to be the center of the arts culture in the metropolitan area. Local artists sponsor exhibits in the district on the first Friday of each month.
- Quality Hill is a residential and commercial neighborhood atop the bluff on the west side of the Central Business District of Downtown Kansas City, across the river from the Charles B. Wheeler Airport.
- Washington-Wheatley is a historically Black neighborhood southeast of the 18th and Vine Historical District.
- The Westside is a historically African American and Chicano/Latino neighborhood near Southwest Boulevard and Interstate 35.
- Westport is a historic district that includes the oldest building still standing in the city and that is home to much of the metropolitan area's entertainment and nightlife.
- Valentine is a neighborhood north of Westport that includes the historic Uptown Theater.
- West Bottoms has many of the oldest buildings and the former location of the city's stockyards. It is now known for its arts community, the American Royal, Hy-Vee Arena, antique stores, and First Fridays events.
- Rosedale is the southernmost district of Kansas City, Kansas, and the only part of that city whose streets are on the metropolitan grid. Home to the main hospital of the University of Kansas Health System, it was the last municipality absorbed by Kansas City, Kansas, prior to the creation of the Unified Government of Kansas City and Wyandotte County.
- Union Hill
- Armourdale is a residential and commercial neighborhood in Kansas City, Kansas, and is one of the historically Chicano(a) neighborhoods of the Kansas City metropolitan area.
- Sheffield is an industrial district in the Blue River valley on the city's far northeast side.
- East Bottoms, also known as the Industrial District, is primarily known for its industrial businesses and railroad activity.
- Brookside is a pedestrian-friendly district built in the 1920s, centered on the Brookside Shopping District at 63rd Street and Brookside Boulevard.
- Hanover Heights is a small neighborhood in Kansas City, Kansas' Rosedale section that was once primarily noted for the antiques shops along 45th Avenue, with the neighborhood's boundaries running mainly between Rainbow Boulevard and State Line Road, running south of the KU Medical Center to the Johnson County border.
- The Historic Northeast District (Northeast) is a working-class immigrant collection of neighborhoods between downtown Kansas City and the suburb of Independence.
- The Truman Sports Complex, at the junction of I-70 and I-435 (east of downtown Kansas City, Missouri), is home to several professional sports attractions. It is anchored by Arrowhead Stadium, home of the Kansas City Chiefs NFL franchise; and Kauffman Stadium, home of Major League Baseball's Kansas City Royals.

=== Jackson County, Missouri ===
==== Downtown ====
Downtown Kansas City, Missouri has a population of 25,204. Downtown is Kansas City's historic center, located entirely within Kansas City, Missouri, and contains the city's original town site, business districts, and residential neighborhoods. Downtown is bounded by the Missouri River on the north, the Missouri-Kansas state line on the west, 31st Street on the south and Woodland Avenue on the east. The downtown area includes the Central Business District and its buildings, which form the city's skyline. The Downtown Loop is formed by Interstates 670, 70, and 35. Within the downtown loop are many of the tall buildings and skyscrapers that make up the city's skyline. The downtown loop also has small, distinct neighborhoods such as Quality Hill, the Garment District, the Financial District, the Convention Center District, and the Power and Light District.

Other nearby neighborhoods are River Market and Columbus Park, both located between the downtown loop and the Missouri River. Between the downtown loop and the state line are the Westside neighborhood and the West Bottoms, located at the bottom of the bluff adjacent to Kaw Point. East of the loop are the 18th & Vine District, the North Bottoms, and Northeast Kansas City (the East Bottoms, Northeast, and Pendleton Heights). South of the loop is the Crossroads District, Union Hill, Crown Center, Hospital Hill, Longfellow, Wendell Phillips, and Washington Wheatley.

The Kansas City Convention Center, Municipal Auditorium, City Hall, Lyric Theater, Midland Theatre, Ilus Davis Park, and Barney Allis Plaza are within the Central Business District inside the downtown loop. The T-Mobile Center and the College Basketball Experience are within the Power & Light District, also within the downtown loop. The Kauffman Center for the Performing Arts is perched upon a high point immediately south of the downtown loop. South of the loop is the Crossroads District, Union Station, Crown Center, the National World War I Museum, Liberty Memorial, Penn Valley Park, University Health Truman Medical Center, Children's Mercy Hospital, and the 18th & Vine District. North of the loop are City Market within the River Market and Richard L. Berkeley Riverfront Park. West of the loop within the West Bottoms are Hy-Vee Arena and Hale Arena.

==== Midtown/Plaza ====
Midtown/Plaza is entirely within Kansas City, Missouri with a population of 40,355. It is just south of downtown, and bounded by 31st Street on the north, the state line on the west, West Gregory Boulevard (71st Street) on the south, and Troost Avenue on the east. Midtown/Plaza, the core of the metropolitan area, has many cultural attractions, shopping and entertainment areas, large hospitals, universities, and the metro area's most densely populated neighborhoods.

Midtown/Plaza has many distinct and historic neighborhoods, including Westport, Hyde Park, and Southmoreland. Shopping is centered on the Country Club Plaza, which has luxury retailers, hotels, and restaurants. Brookside and Westport also contain smaller-scale, neighborhood-oriented, and niche-market retailers. Midtown is home to Saint Luke's Hospital of Kansas City and Research Medical Center. Cultural attractions include the Nelson-Atkins Museum of Art, Kemper Museum of Contemporary Art, Uptown Theater, Starlight Theater, the Kansas City Zoo, Loose Park, and Swope Park. The last of these has a soccer complex that is home to the Swope Park Rangers, a USL Championship team that is the official reserve side for the area's Major League Soccer club, Sporting Kansas City. Major educational institutions include the University of Missouri–Kansas City, Rockhurst University, Kansas City Art Institute, Stowers Institute for Medical Research, Midwest Research Institute, and Penn Valley Community College.

==== East Side ====
East Side of the Metro is primarily eastern Jackson County which is an area of the Kansas City Metro that contains the far-eastern urban side of Kansas City, Missouri and the following large suburbs of Blue Springs, Independence, and Lee's Summit. The area includes western Lafayette County Missouri and the far northeast portion of Cass County Missouri. The East Side of Metro includes the Missouri suburbs of Independence, Grandview, Blue Springs, Raytown, Lees Summit, Grain Valley, Oak Grove, Sugar Creek, River Bend, Lake Lotawana, Lone Jack, Greenwood, Unity Village, Buckner, Pleasant Hill, Bates City, Odessa, and Lake Tapawingo. Arrowhead Stadium, home of the NFL's Kansas City Chiefs and Kauffman Stadium, home of the MLB's Kansas City Royals are on the eastern edge of Kansas City. The Cable Dahmer Arena home of the ECHL's Kansas City Mavericks and the MASL's Kansas City Comets is in Independence.

=== Johnson County, Kansas ===
Johnson County, Kansas contains many municipalities with a population of 609,863. It has the largest economy in the metropolitan area and is the fastest growing county by total population. Municipalities include Overland Park, Olathe, Shawnee, Leawood, Lenexa, Prairie Village, Gardner, Merriam, Mission, Roeland Park, Fairway, Lake Quivira, Mission Hills, Mission Woods, Westwood, and Westwood Hills. Corporate headquarters include Garmin, Black & Veatch, and AMC Theatres, and the secondary headquarters of T-Mobile. Many local area attractions and shopping districts are in Johnson County, such as Oak Park Mall, Town Center Plaza, and Prairie Fire.

=== The Northland (Missouri) ===
The Northland is the area north of the Missouri River, bordered by the Kansas state line on the west. The southern half of Platte County, and much of Clay County make up the area. The Northland is a fast-growing, primarily suburban region of the metropolitan area, although much of it is contained within the city limits of Kansas City, Missouri. The economy of the Northland is dominated by Cerner, Kansas City International Airport, Ford Kansas City Assembly Plant, the Zona Rosa shopping community and three riverboat casinos. The metro area's largest amusement park, Worlds of Fun and Oceans of Fun, is in the Northland. Major educational institutions in the Northland include Park University, William Jewell College, and the Maple Woods campus of Metropolitan Community College. The Northland is also home to the popular recreational reservoir, Smithville Lake. Communities of the Northland outside the city limits include Parkville, Kearney, Liberty, Platte City, Gladstone, Riverside, Smithville, North Kansas City, and Weatherby Lake.

=== Wyandotte County, Kansas ===
Wyandotte County, Kansas has a population of 169,245 and contains Kansas City, Kansas, Bonner Springs, Kansas, and Edwardsville, Kansas. Kansas City, Kansas is locally called "KCK" to distinguish it from the larger Kansas City, Missouri (KCMO). It contains many residential neighborhoods, the Fairfax Industrial District, and the Village West entertainment district. The General Motors Fairfax Assembly Plant is in the Fairfax Industrial District. Village West contains many area attractions. This includes many sporting venues such as Sporting Park, home of the area MLS soccer team Sporting Kansas City, the Kansas Speedway, which hosts many NASCAR races, and Field of Legends, home of the independent baseball team, the Kansas City Monarchs, and the Legends shopping district. Bonner Springs is home to the Azura Amphitheater (commonly known as the Sandstone Amphitheater), the National Agricultural Center and Hall of Fame, Wyandotte County Historical Museum, and the annual Kansas City Renaissance Festival.

=== Cass County, Missouri ===
Cass County, Missouri has a population of 107,824 and contains parts of "South Kansas City". This area consists of the most southern part of Kansas City, Missouri, and the suburbs of Harrisonville, Belton, Loch Lloyd, Peculiar, and Raymore.

=== Leavenworth County, Kansas ===
Leavenworth County, Kansas has a population of 81,881 and contains the cities of Leavenworth and Lansing, and the Leavenworth Federal Penitentiary.

== Population ==
Historical population
Census	Pop.	Note	%±
1900	305,427		—
1910	422,180		38.2%
1920	528,833		25.3%
1930	665,655		25.9%
1940	686,643		3.2%
1950	814,357		18.6%
1960	1,266,447		55.5%
1970	1,434,793		13.3%
1980	1,504,203		4.8%
1990	1,636,528		8.8%
2000	1,836,038		12.2%
2010	2,009,342		9.4%
2020	2,192,035		9.1%
2025 (est.)	2,270,682		3.6%
U.S. Decennial Census; 1790–1960 1900–1990; 1990–2000

The Kansas City metropolitan area (MO-KS) population in 2018 was 2,106,632 and the Kansas City CSA in 2022 was 2,209,152.

=== More than 500,000 ===
- Kansas City, Missouri – Pop: 508,090

=== More than 100,000 ===
- Overland Park, Kansas – Pop: 202,893
- Kansas City, Kansas – Pop: 156,607
- Olathe, Kansas – Pop: 141,290
- Independence, Missouri – Pop: 123,011
- Lee's Summit, Missouri – Pop: 101,108

=== 50,000–99,999 ===
- Shawnee, Kansas – Pop: 67,311
- Blue Springs, Missouri – Pop: 58,604
- Lenexa, Kansas – Pop: 57,434

=== 20,000–49,999 ===
- Leavenworth, Kansas – Pop: 37,351
- Leawood, Kansas – Pop: 33,902
- Liberty, Missouri – Pop: 30,167
- Raytown, Missouri – Pop: 30,012
- Gladstone, Missouri – Pop: 27,063
- Grandview, Missouri – Pop: 26,209
- Belton, Missouri – Pop: 23,953
- Gardner, Kansas – Pop: 23,287
- Prairie Village, Kansas – Pop: 22,957
- Raymore, Missouri – Pop: 22,941

=== 10,000–19,999 ===
- Grain Valley, Missouri – Pop: 15,627
- Ottawa, Kansas – Pop: 12,625
- Lansing, Kansas – Pop: 11,239
- Merriam, Kansas – Pop: 11,098
- Excelsior Springs, Missouri – Pop: 10,553
- Smithville, Missouri - Pop: 10,406
- Kearney, Missouri – Pop: 10,404
- Harrisonville, Missouri – Pop: 10,121

=== Counties ===
The Kansas City, MO-KS Metropolitan Statistical Area, as defined by the Office of Management and Budget, is an area consisting of five counties in Kansas and nine counties in Missouri. The MSA had an estimated population of 2,270,682 as of 2025.

County	State	Seat(s)	2025 estimate	2020 census	Change	Area	Density
Jackson	Missouri	Independence & Kansas City	732,994	717,204	+2.20%	616 sq mi (1,600 km^{2})	1,190/sq mi (459/km^{2})
Johnson	Kansas	Olathe	636,906	609,863	+4.43%	480 sq mi (1,200 km^{2})	1,327/sq mi (512/km^{2})
Clay	Missouri	Liberty	265,032	253,335	+4.62%	409 sq mi (1,060 km^{2})	648/sq mi (250/km^{2})
Wyandotte	Kansas	Kansas City	170,597	169,245	+0.80%	156 sq mi (400 km^{2})	1,094/sq mi (422/km^{2})
Cass	Missouri	Harrisonville	115,859	107,824	+7.45%	702 sq mi (1,820 km^{2})	165/sq mi (64/km^{2})
Platte	Missouri	Platte City	114,400	106,718	+7.20%	427 sq mi (1,110 km^{2})	268/sq mi (103/km^{2})
Leavenworth	Kansas	Leavenworth	84,590	81,881	+3.31%	469 sq mi (1,210 km^{2})	180/sq mi (70/km^{2})
Miami	Kansas	Paola	36,240	34,191	+5.99%	590 sq mi (1,500 km^{2})	61/sq mi (24/km^{2})
Lafayette	Missouri	Lexington	33,531	32,984	+1.66%	639 sq mi (1,660 km^{2})	52/sq mi (20/km^{2})
Ray	Missouri	Richmond	23,398	23,158	+1.04%	574 sq mi (1,490 km^{2})	41/sq mi (16/km^{2})
Clinton	Missouri	Plattsburg	21,661	21,184	+2.25%	423 sq mi (1,100 km^{2})	51/sq mi (20/km^{2})
Bates	Missouri	Butler	16,512	16,042	+2.93%	851 sq mi (2,200 km^{2})	19/sq mi (7/km^{2})
Linn	Kansas	Mound City	9,950	9,591	+3.74%	606 sq mi (1,570 km^{2})	16/sq mi (6/km^{2})
Caldwell	Missouri	Kingston	9,012	8,815	+2.23%	430 sq mi (1,100 km^{2})	21/sq mi (8/km^{2})
Total			2,270,682	2,192,035	+3.59%	7,372 sq mi (19,090 km^{2})	308/sq mi (119/km^{2})

=== Associated areas ===
Often associated with Kansas City, the cities of Lawrence, Kansas and Saint Joseph, Missouri are identified as separate Metropolitan Statistical Areas.

The Kansas City–Overland Park–Kansas City, MO-KS Combined Statistical Area (CSA) encompasses the Metropolitan statistical areas (MSA) of Kansas City MO-KS, the St. Joseph metropolitan area and the Lawrence, Kansas metropolitan area with the Micropolitan Statistical Areas (μSA) of Warrensburg, Missouri, Atchison, Kansas, and Ottawa, Kansas. (Warrensburg is in Johnson County, Missouri. Atchison is in Atchison County, Kansas. Ottawa is in Franklin County, Kansas.) The combined statistical area covers a total area of 9,220 sq mi (23,900 km^{2}) including 103 sq mi (270 km^{2}) of water.

Statistical Area	2025 Estimate	2020 Census	Change	Area	Density
Kansas City, MO-KS Metropolitan Statistical Area	2,270,682	2,192,035	+3.59%	7,372 sq mi (19,090 km^{2})	308/sq mi (119/km^{2})
Lawrence, KS Metropolitan Statistical Area	120,920	118,785	+1.80%	475 sq mi (1,230 km^{2})	255/sq mi (98/km^{2})
St. Joseph, MO-KS Metropolitan Statistical Area	119,170	121,467	−1.89%	1,675 sq mi (4,340 km^{2})	71/sq mi (27/km^{2})
Warrensburg, MO Micropolitan Statistical Area	56,670	54,013	+4.92%	833 sq mi (2,160 km^{2})	68/sq mi (26/km^{2})
Ottawa, KS Micropolitan Statistical Area	26,299	25,996	+1.17%	577 sq mi (1,490 km^{2})	46/sq mi (18/km^{2})
Atchison, KS Micropolitan Statistical Area	16,172	16,348	−1.08%	434 sq mi (1,120 km^{2})	37/sq mi (14/km^{2})
Total	2,609,913	2,528,644	+3.21%	11,366 sq mi (29,440 km^{2})	230/sq mi (89/km^{2})

== Politics ==
Presidential elections results in the Kansas City metropolitan area
Year	Democratic	Republican	Third parties
2024	50.2% 541,664	47.6% 513,617	2.3% 24,347
2020	51.2% 559,595	46.5% 508,524	2.3% 24,698
2016	45.5% 436,284	47.0% 451,531	7.5% 72,242
2012	47.8% 447,036	50.1% 468,710	2.1% 19,579
2008	52.0% 515,039	46.5% 459,981	1.5% 14,411
2004	47.9% 434,368	51.3% 464,493	0.8% 7,199
2000	48.9% 377,333	48.0% 370,249	3.1% 23,961

The Kansas City metro area is a swing metro area, going between the Republican and Democratic parties for decades and voting for Democratic and Republican presidential candidates equally since 2000. It is unlike most other large cities in the United States; most populous metropolitan areas lean Democratic, which makes Kansas City slightly Republican as compared to metros of similar size, even as compared to St. Louis, which is also centered in Missouri.

== Economy ==
=== GDP ===
In 2015, the metropolitan area accounted for 40.9% of the total GDP in the state of Kansas and 22.7% of the total GDP in the state of Missouri.

=== Employment ===
As of 2019, Missouri accounted for 56% of employment and Kansas accounted for 44% of employment. From 2018 to 2019 Kansas added 13,000 jobs and Missouri added 6,500 jobs. Kansas side employment grew by 2.7% and Missouri side employment grew by 1.1%; job growth in Kansas was more than double that in Missouri. Professional and business employment growth was due entirely to a gain of 5,200 jobs in the Kansas portion of the metro area.

=== Largest employers ===
Some of the largest employers and business enterprises are:

- AdventHealth Shawnee Mission
- American Academy of Family Physicians
- AMC Theatres
- American Century Investments
- Andrews McMeel Universal (representing Garfield, Calvin and Hobbes, and Doonesbury)
- Asurion
- AT&T
- Aventis
- Bayer HealthCare, LLC-Animal Div
- Black & Veatch Engineering Consultants
- Blue Cross and Blue Shield of Kansas City
- BNSF Railway
- Children's Mercy Hospital
- Citigroup
- EMBARQ
- Farmers Insurance Group
- Federal Reserve Bank of Kansas City
- FedEx Ground Package System, Inc.
- Ford Motor Company
- GEICO
- GARMIN International
- Synchrony Financial/GE Credit Services
- General Motors
- H&R Block
- Hallmark Cards
- Honeywell
- Husqvarna
- Kiewit Power Engineers Company
- MillerCoors
- OptumRx
- Oracle (formerly Cerner Corp)
- Overland Park Regional Medical Center
- Quest Diagnostics/Lab One
- State Street Corporation
- T-Mobile (formerly Sprint)
- The Kansas City Star
- Truman Medical Center-Hospital Hill
- United Parcel Service
- University of Kansas Health System
- Waddell & Reed Financial

== Business interests ==
The Kansas City metropolitan area's largest private employer is Cerner Corporation. Cerner, a global healthcare IT company which is headquartered in North Kansas City, employs nearly 10,000 people in the area with a total workforce of nearly 20,000 people including global employees. In August 2014, the company announced its acquisition of competitor Siemens Healthcare. Cerner has several campuses across the area with its World Headquarters building in North Kansas City, Innovations Campus in South Kansas City, and Continuous Campus in Kansas City, Kansas.

=== Headquarters ===
These are among the largest companies and organizations, excluding educational institutions, that are headquartered in or have since relocated from the metropolitan area. Headquarters of most are located in Kansas City, Missouri.

- American Century Investments, an investment management firm
- AMC Theatres, a movie theater chain (Leawood, Kansas)
- Andrews McMeel Universal, a syndication and publication company which represents media/entertainment features such as Dear Abby, Garfield, Calvin and Hobbes and Doonesbury
- Applebee's, a restaurant chain (Lenexa, Kansas), relocated to Glendale, California in 2015
- BATS Global Markets, a listed shares market (Lenexa, Kansas)
- Black & Veatch Corporation, engineering firm (Overland Park, Kansas)
- Burns & McDonnell, engineering firm (Kansas City, Missouri)
- CenturyLink (formerly Embarq Corporation), telecommunications company (headquarters in Monroe, Louisiana)
- Oracle Health (formerly Cerner), supplier of healthcare information technology solutions (North Kansas City, Missouri)
- Church of the Nazarene
- Commerce Bancshares, a bank serving Kansas, Missouri and Illinois
- Community of Christ, International Headquarters (Independence, Missouri)
- Dairy Farmers of America National Headquarters, (Kansas City, Kansas)
- DST Systems, provider of information processing and computer software services and products
- Fellowship of Christian Athletes (FCA)
- Ferrellgas, retailer and distributor of natural gas (Liberty, Missouri)
- FishNet Security, a provider of information security services and technology resale - Overland Park, KS
- Fort Dodge Animal Health, an animal health pharmaceutical and vaccine manufacturer and a division of Wyeth (Overland Park, Kansas)
- Freightquote.com, largest online third party logistics provider
- Garmin, largest maker of GPS-based electronics (Olathe, Kansas)
- Hallmark Cards, largest maker of greeting cards in the U.S.
- HNTB Corporation, architectural and engineering firm
- H&R Block, financial corporation and former parent company of CompuServe, known mostly for their income tax preparation services
- Hostess Brands Maker of Twinkies and other snack cakes. (Closed in 2024 after J.M Smucker Purchase)
- Huhtamaki, makers of Chinet paper dinnerware (De Soto)
- Inergy, L.P., retailers and distributors of natural gas
- International Brotherhood of Boilermakers, Iron Ship Builders, Blacksmiths, Forgers and Helpers
- J. E. Dunn Construction Group, construction contractor
- Kansas City Board of Trade, a commodity futures and options exchange
- Kansas City Power and Light Company, a regulated provider of electricity and energy-related products and services
- Kansas City Southern Industries, operators of a Class I railroad
- Lockton Companies, the largest privately held insurance brokerage in the U.S.
- MK12 Studios, a filmmaking, animation, and design studio
- National Association of Intercollegiate Athletics (NAIA)
- Newport Television – privately held broadcasting company
- People to People International, a voluntary organization founded by President Dwight Eisenhower
- Perceptive Software, makers of "Image NOW" software (Lenexa, Kansas)
- Polsinelli, AmLaw100-ranked national law firm
- Populous (formerly HOK Sport + Venue + Event), a major sports architectural firm
- Russell Stover Candies
- T-Mobile which is retaining the former Sprint campus as a secondary headquarters (Overland Park, Kansas)
- Tradebot, a firm in the financial sector
- UMB Financial Corporation, a commercial bank serving a multi-state area of the Midwest
- Unity Church
- Veterans of Foreign Wars
- Waddell & Reed, an investment management and brokerage firm (Overland Park, Kansas)
- Walton Construction, a construction contractor
- YRC Worldwide Inc., known mostly from its former name and brand Yellow Freight, one of the largest transportation service providers in the world (Overland Park, Kansas)

The Kansas City Federal Reserve Bank is one of twelve such banks located in the United States.

=== Hospitals ===
- AdventHealth Lenexa City Center
- AdventHealth Shawnee Mission
- AdventHealth South Overland Park
- Centerpoint Medical Center
- Children's Mercy Hospital
- Kansas City Orthopaedic Institute
- Kansas City Veterans Affairs Hospital
- Kindred Hospital Kansas City
- Lee's Summit Medical Center
- Menorah Medical Center
- North Kansas City Hospital
- Olathe Medical Center
- Overland Park Regional Medical Center
- Providence Medical Center
- Research Medical Center
- St. Joseph Medical Center
- Saint Luke's Hospital of Kansas City
- Saint Luke's East Hospital
- Saint Luke's South Hospital
- St. Mary's Medical Center
- University Health Truman Medical Center
- University of Kansas Hospital (KU Med Center)

=== Shopping centers ===
- Adams Dairy Landing
- Blue Ridge Crossing
- Crown Center
- Country Club Plaza
- The Great Mall of the Great Plains (Demolished March 2017)
- Independence Center
- The Landing Mall
- Legends Outlets Kansas City
- Metcalf South Shopping Center (Demolished June/July 2017)
- Metro North Mall (Demolished 2016)
- Oak Park Mall
- Park Place
- Summit Fair
- Summit Woods Crossing
- Town Center Plaza
- Town Pavilion
- Ward Parkway Center
- Zona Rosa

== Transportation ==
=== Highways ===
The Kansas City metropolitan area has more freeway lane miles per capita than any other large metropolitan area in the United States. This is 27% more than the second-place Dallas/Fort Worth Metroplex, 50% more than the average American metro area, and nearly 75% more than the large metro area with the least in Las Vegas.

==== Interstates ====
The Kansas City area is a confluence of four major U.S. interstate highways:

- I-29 – North to St. Joseph, Missouri
- I-35 – North to Des Moines, Iowa and south to Wichita, Kansas
- I-49 – South to Joplin
- I-70 – East to St. Louis and west to Topeka, Kansas

Other interstates that cross through the area include:

- I-435 – A bi-state loop through Jackson, Clay and Platte counties in Missouri and through Johnson and Wyandotte counties in Kansas. It is the second-longest single-numbered beltway in the U.S., and the fourth-longest in the world.
- I-470 – Connects South Kansas City with Lee's Summit and Independence.
- I-635 – Connects Johnson County and Kansas City, Kansas to I-29, I-70, and I-35.
- I-670 – A southern bypass of I-70 and the southern portion of the downtown loop. The roadway is designated on road signs as East I-70, when exiting from I-35 while traveling north.

==== US Highways ====
U.S. Highways serving the Kansas City Metro Area include these:

- US 24 – Running from Independence Avenue and Winner Road, between downtown Kansas City and Independence, Missouri, it serves as a street-level connection to Independence.
- US 40 – U.S. 40 is one of six east-west U.S.-numbered routes that run (or ran) from coast to coast. It serves as a business loop and an alternate route for I-70.
- US 50 – Enters the area in southern Johnson County, follows I-435 from the west to I-470, then splits off of I-470 in Lee's Summit to continue eastward to Jefferson City and St. Louis as a regular highway. Its former route through Raytown and southeast Kansas City was renumbered as Route 350. U.S. 50 is also one of the six east–west highways that run coast-to-coast through the United States.
- US-56 - Enters the area concurrent with I-35 until the Shawnee Mission Parkway exit. It runs east along the Parkway into the Plaza area of Kansas City before terminating at US-71.
- US 69 – Connects Excelsior Springs, Missouri in the north and serves as a freeway in Johnson County Connecting I-35 to I-435 and connecting Overland Park to Louisburg and Linn Valley on the Kansas side.
- US 71 – In the north, concurrent with I-29 to Amazonia, Missouri, and serves as a freeway (Bruce R. Watkins Drive) south from downtown, joining with I-49 at the Grandview Triangle.
- US 169 – Connects Smithville, Missouri, in the north.

==== Kansas state highways ====
Kansas highways in the area include these:

- K-5 – A minor freeway bypassing the north of Kansas City, Kansas, connecting the GM Fairfax plant with I-635. K-5 continues as Leavenworth Road west to I-435 then on to Leavenworth, Kansas.
- K-7 – A freeway linking Leavenworth, Wyandotte and Johnson Counties in Kansas.
- K-10 – A freeway linking I-435 to De Soto and Lawrence.
- K-32 – A highway that links Lawrence to Wyandotte County in Kansas.

==== Missouri state highways ====
Missouri highways in the area include these:

- Route 7 - An important state highway serving the eastern suburbs of the metro. Primarily running north and south through Jackson and Cass Counties. Connecting the following communities: Independence, Blue Springs, Lake Lotawana, Pleasant Hill and Harrisonville. It is the commercial backbone for Blue Springs, Lake Lotawana and Pleasant Hill.
- Route 9 – A minor freeway northwest of North Kansas City, and serves as a commercial backbone to North Kansas City, Riverside, Platte Woods and Parkville.
- Route 45 – Known as Tom Watson Parkway in the Kansas City vicinity until it intersects with I-435, it is a highway that spans 42 miles from I-29/US-71 to US-59/MO-273 in Lewis & Clark Village, Missouri. Its eastern segment is also known as NW 64th Street. The highway serves as a commercial backbone of Parkville, Missouri and runs across Riss Lake. The National Golf Club of Kansas City is located on MO-45.
- Route 58 - A state highway serving the southern suburbs of Belton and Raymore.
- Route 92 – This narrow and hilly road crosses the northern part of the metro, connecting Platte City, Smithville, Kearney, and Excelsior Springs.
- Route 150 – A highway linking southern Lee's Summit and Grandview to the Kansas suburbs at State Line Road.
- Route 152 – A freeway contained entirely in Kansas City's Northland, stretching from Liberty in Clay County west until it intersects with I-435 near Parkville, Missouri.
- Route 210 – A minor freeway east of North Kansas City that, as a two-lane road, stretches to Richmond, Missouri.
- Route 291 – Formerly an eastern bypass route of U.S. 71, this minor freeway connects Harrisonville and Lee's Summit to Independence, Sugar Creek, Liberty and Kansas City North. The roadway is designated on road signs alongside I-470 north of Lee's Summit.
- Route 350 – This road crosses through Raytown as Blue Parkway.

==== Other roads ====
These are other notable roads:

- 18th Street Expressway – a freeway carrying US-69 through central Wyandotte County from I-35 to I-70.
- Ward Parkway – A scenic parkway in Kansas City, Missouri, near the Kansas-Missouri state line, where many large historic mansions and fountains are located.
- Broadway – A street that runs from the west side of downtown Kansas City to Westport. The street has long been an entertainment center, with various bars, live jazz outlets, and restaurants along it. It also forms the eastern border of Quality Hill, one of the oldest neighborhoods in Kansas City.
- The Paseo – Part of the city's original system of parks and boulevards developed beginning in the late 1880s, it is the longest of the original boulevards, and the only one that runs the entire length of the pre-World War II city boundary, from the Missouri River bluffs in the north to 79th Street on the south.
- Shawnee Mission Parkway – Former alignment of K-10 from 1929 to 1983; K-58 from 1956 to 1979; US-56 from 1957 to 1968; K-12 from 1983 to 1998. Serves Shawnee Mission.
- Troost Avenue – A north-south thoroughfare 11 blocks east of Main Street, named for an early Kansas City settler and dentist, Benoist Troost. The street roughly divides the city's mostly black neighborhoods to its east from its mostly white ones to its west.
- Swope Parkway – Running on the south side of the Brush Creek valley eastward from The Paseo, then southward from its junction with Benton Boulevard, this street is the main route from the city's midtown to its largest city park, Swope Park.
- North Oak Trafficway – A major road in the Northland. The roadway is designated as MO-283 from MO-9 to I-29. It is a major road in the Northland and serves as the commercial backbone of Gladstone, Missouri.
- Barry Road – Runs along the former route of Military Road, which ran from Liberty to Fort Leavenworth. It is now a major commercial street in the Northland, although it has been paralleled by MO-152 for its entire route and has been effectively replaced by it east of Indiana Avenue.
- 87th Street Parkway – A major parkway that extends from Overland Park to De Soto. Former alignment of K-10 from 1929 to 1983.

==== Street numbers ====
The Missouri side of the metropolitan area south of the Missouri River shares a grid system with Johnson County on the Kansas side. Most east–west streets are numbered and most north–south streets named. Addresses on east–west streets are numbered from Main Street in Kansas City, Missouri, and on north–south streets from St. John Avenue (or the Missouri River, in the River Market area). The direction 'South' in street and address numbers is generally implied if 'North' is not specified, except for numbered 'avenues' in North Kansas City. In the northland, east–west streets use the prefix N.E. or N.W., depending on the side of N. Main on which they lie.

=== Air ===
The metro has several airports. Primary service is at Kansas City International Airport (MCI), 15 miles northwest of downtown Kansas City, Missouri. It was opened in 1972 as TWA's "Airport of the Future", a global hub for supersonic transport and the Boeing 747. A new single-terminal building was opened on February 28, 2023, to modernize the design, operations, and passenger experience.

The much smaller Charles B. Wheeler Downtown Airport, immediately north of downtown across the Missouri River, was the original headquarters of Trans World Airlines (TWA) and houses the Airline History Museum. It served as the area's major airport until 1972, when Kansas City International (then known as Mid-Continent International Airport and home to an Overhaul Base for TWA) became the primary airport for the metropolitan area after undergoing $150 million in upgrades that had been approved by voters in a 1966 bond issue. Downtown Airport is still used for general aviation and airshows.

Two general aviation airports are in Johnson County, Kansas. New Century AirCenter borders southwest Olathe and northeast Gardner. The primary runway at New Century AirCenter is the second longest runway in the region next to those at Kansas City International Airport. It is 7 miles (11 km) from the Logistics Park Kansas City Intermodal Facility. Johnson County Executive Airport has one runway on 500 acres and is the fourth-busiest towered airport in the state of Kansas.

=== Rail ===
Kansas City is a freight hub served by the BNSF, CPKC, Norfolk Southern, and Union Pacific. Kansas City Terminal Railway and Kaw River Railroad provide local interchange and switching service.

Amtrak Passenger service is centered at Kansas City, Missouri's Union Station and managed by the Kansas City Terminal. Daily long-distance services are Missouri River Runner with two round trips daily to Saint Louis, connecting to Chicago via the Lincoln Service; and Southwest Chief with daily service between Chicago and Los Angeles.

=== Transit ===
City buses operated by the Kansas City Area Transportation Authority (KCATA) provide most public transportation. The Metro Area Express (MAX) became Kansas City, Missouri's first bus rapid transit line in July 2005, and operates and is marketed akin to a rail system instead of a local bus line. The MAX links River Market, Downtown, Union Station, Crown Center, and Country Club Plaza. Buses in Johnson County, Kansas, are operated by Johnson County Transit, known as The JO.

The KC Streetcar is a 6.4-mile modern streetcar line in Downtown Kansas City. Opened to the public in May 2016, it is maintained and operated by the Kansas City Streetcar Authority, a non-profit corporation made up of private sector stakeholders and city appointees. A ballot initiative to fund construction of the $102 million line was approved by voters on December 12, 2012. The system originally ran between River Market and Union Station, mostly along Main Street, and was later extended north to Riverfront and south to UMKC.

There are no commuter rail services.

Intercity bus service is provided by Greyhound Lines and Jefferson Lines at the Kansas City Bus Station.

== Cultural attractions ==
Photo	Name	City	Notes
	Nelson-Atkins Museum of Art	Kansas City, Missouri	Founded in 1933, the Nelson-Atkins maintains wide-ranging collections of more than 35,000 works of art and welcomes 500,000 visitors a year.
Chicago & Alton Railroad Depot, Independence, Missouri	Chicago & Alton Railroad Depot	Independence, Missouri	The oldest business building in Independence, Missouri. In 1978, the hotel, which originally served the railroad, moved from the original site just south of Main Street to its present location.
Dillingham-Lewis House Museum, Blue Springs, Missouri	Dillingham-Lewis House Museum	Blue Springs, Missouri	Built in 1906, the only native limestone structure in Blue Springs. The house is named after two families.
	Fort Osage National Historic Site	Sibley, Missouri	Part of the early 19th century U.S. factory trading post system for the Osage Nation.
	Jackson County Jail and Marshal's House	Independence, Missouri	Former jail site, operated by the county historical society, which housed thousands of prisoners including Frank James and William Clark Quantrill.
Leila's Hair Museum, Independence, Missouri	Leila's Hair Museum	Independence, Missouri	A museum of hair art since the 19th century.
Lone Jack Battlefield Museum, Lone Jack, Missouri	Lone Jack Battlefield Museum	Lone Jack	The only Civil War Museum in Jackson County, Missouri, and one of the few battlefields where the soldiers – who perished during the battle – are still buried on the battlefield.
	Midwest Genealogy Center	Independence, Missouri	The largest freestanding public genealogy research library in the USA.
Photo of The National Frontier Trails Museum in Independence Missouri.	National Frontier Trails Museum	Independence, Missouri	A museum, interpretive center, and research library about the history of principal western U.S. trails.
Rice-Tremonti Home, Raytown, Missouri	Rice-Tremonti Home	Raytown, Missouri	Home built on the Santa Fe Trail in 1844 by Archibald Rice and his family.
	Cable Dahmer Arena	Independence, Missouri	A 5,800-seat multi-purpose arena that hosts the Kansas City Mavericks ice hockey team.
	Harry S. Truman Historic District	Independence and Grandview, Missouri	Associated with 33rd U.S. President Harry S. Truman, the district includes: The Truman Presidential Library, in Independence.; The Truman home, in Independence, where Truman lived for most of his time in Missouri.; The Truman Farm, in Grandview, built in 1894 by Truman's maternal grandmother.
	Truman Sports Complex	Kansas City, Missouri	Two major sports venues: Arrowhead Stadium, Kansas City Chiefs (football); Kauffman Stadium, Kansas City Royals (baseball)
	Grinter Place	Kansas City, Kansas	A home built in 1857 by one of the earliest settlers.
	Arabia Steamboat Museum	Kansas City, Missouri	Artifacts from the Arabia, a steamboat that sank in the Missouri River in 1856.

== Architecture ==
The architecture of Kansas City, Missouri, and the metropolitan area includes major works by many of the world's most distinguished architects and firms, including McKim, Mead and White; Jarvis Hunt; Wight and Wight; Graham, Anderson, Probst and White; Hoit, Price & Barnes; Frank Lloyd Wright; the Office of Mies van der Rohe; Barry Byrne; Edward Larrabee Barnes; Harry Weese; and Skidmore, Owings & Merrill.

- The KCTV-Tower is a 1,042 feet (318 m) pyramid-shaped television and radio tower used primarily by local CBS affiliate KCTV (channel 5). It is at the corner of 31st and Main Streets, next to the studio facilities of PBS member station KCPT (which formerly housed the original studios of KCTV), and is visible from many parts of the city, especially at night due to the string of lights adorning the tower.
- The twin red-brick towers of the American Century Investments complex are oriented north and south along Main at 45th Street, just north of the Country Club Plaza (the Kemper Museum of Contemporary Art is slightly east, and the Nelson-Atkins Museum of Art is east and slightly south).
- Kansas City Community Christian Church, at 4601 Main Street, has a group of lights that shoot a beam upwards to the sky at night. Designed by Frank Lloyd Wright in the 1950s, it is slightly south of and across the street from the American Century Investment Towers (the Nelson Atkins is to the east, and the Kemper Museum is to the north and slightly east).
- Bartle Hall has a section that somewhat resembles a north–south suspension bridge, crossing over I-670 at the southwest corner of the downtown loop. It has four towers, with metal sculptures on top of each tower.
- The Veterans Affairs Medical Center, near the intersection of I-70, Linwood Boulevard and Van Brunt Boulevard, has a large "VA" emblem.
- The Kauffman Center for the Performing Arts, at 16th Street and Broadway (just south of the downtown loop), with its tiered glass and steel half-domes, has a design reminiscent of the world-famous Sydney Opera House.

== Colleges and universities ==
Top 5 largest colleges by total enrollment (within the MSA)

1. Johnson County Community College - 18,638
2. Metropolitan Community College - 17,025
3. University of Missouri-Kansas City - 16,383
4. Park University - 9,512
5. Kansas City Kansas Community College - 4,807

List of institutions (including those in the CSA):

- Avila University - Kansas City, MO
- Baker University - Baldwin City, KS
- Benedictine College - Atchison, KS
- Calvary University - Kansas City, MO
- Cleveland University-Kansas City - Kansas City, KS
- DeVry University - Kansas City, MO
- Donnelly College - Kansas City, KS
- Friends University - Lenexa, KS
- Graceland University - Independence, MO
- University of Arkansas Grantham - Lenexa, KS (administrative location)
- Haskell Indian Nations University - Lawrence, KS
- Highland Community College- Highland, KS
- Johnson County Community College - Overland Park, KS
- Kansas Christian College - Overland Park, KS
- Kansas City Art Institute - Kansas City, MO
- Kansas City Kansas Community College - Kansas City, KS
- Kansas City University of Medicine and Biosciences - Kansas City, MO
- Kansas State University Olathe Innovation Campus - Olathe, KS
- Metropolitan Community College (Penn Valley, Maple Woods, Business and Technology Center, Blue River, and Longview) - Kansas City, MO
- MidAmerica Nazarene University - Olathe, KS
- Midwestern Baptist Theological Seminary - Kansas City, MO
- Missouri Western State University - St. Joseph, MO
- National American University - Kansas City, MO
- Nazarene Theological Seminary - Kansas City, MO
- Northwest Missouri State University - Maryville, MO
- Ottawa University - Overland Park, KS
- Park University - Parkville, MO
- Pinnacle Career Institute - Kansas City, KS
- Pittsburg State University - Lenexa, KS
- Rasmussen College - Overland Park, KS
- Rockhurst University - Kansas City, MO
- Saint Paul School of Theology - Leawood, KS
- University of Central Missouri - Warrensburg, MO
- University of Kansas - Lawrence, KS
- University of Kansas Edwards Campus - Overland Park, KS
- University of Kansas Medical Center - Kansas City, KS
- University of Missouri–Kansas City - Kansas City, MO
- University of Saint Mary - Leavenworth, KS
- William Jewell College - Liberty, MO

== Libraries ==
The metro public library systems include Kansas City Public Library (Missouri), Mid-Continent Public Library, Kansas City, Kansas Public Library, and Johnson County Library. Private libraries include the Harry S. Truman Presidential Library and Museum and the Linda Hall Library.

== Media ==
=== Print ===
The Kansas City Star is the metropolitan area's major daily newspaper. The McClatchy Company, which owns The Star, also owns two suburban weeklies: Lee's Summit Journal and Olathe Journal.

The Kansas City Kansan serves Wyandotte County, having moved from print to an online format in 2009. Additional weekly papers in the metropolitan area include the Liberty Tribune, Sun Newspapers of Johnson County, The Examiner in Independence and eastern Jackson County, The Pitch, and the Kansas-Missouri Sentinel. The faith-based newspapers are The Metro Voice Christian Newspaper and the Jewish Chronicle. Dos Mundos is a bilingual newspaper with articles in Spanish and English, and Mi Raza magazine is the area's only weekly Hispanic publication printed in Spanish. The Kansas City Call is an African American weekly newspaper.

=== Broadcast ===
According to Arbitron, about 1.5 million people over the age of 12 live within the Kansas City DMA, making it the 30th largest market for radio and 31st for television according to Nielsen. The Kansas City television and radio markets cover 32 counties encompassing northwestern Missouri and northeast Kansas.

==== Television ====
Television stations in the Kansas City metropolitan area, with all major network affiliates represented, include:

- WDAF-TV, channel 4 (Fox)
- KCTV, channel 5 (CBS)
- KMBC-TV, channel 9 (ABC)
- KTAJ-TV, channel 16 (TBN)
- KCPT, channel 19 (PBS)
- KUKC-LD, channel 20 (Univision)
- KCWE, channel 29 (The CW)
- KSHB-TV, channel 41 (NBC)
- KMCI-TV, channel 38 (independent)
- KGKC-LD, channel 39 (Telemundo)
- KPXE-TV, channel 50 (Ion Television)
- KSMO-TV, channel 62 (MyNetworkTV)

The Kansas City television market is in very close proximity to two other media markets, St. Joseph and Topeka. As such, most of the television stations in the Kansas City area are receivable over-the-air in portions of both markets, including their principal cities; likewise, stations from Topeka are receivable as far east as Kansas City, Kansas and stations from St. Joseph are viewable as far south as Kansas City, Missouri's immediate northern suburbs.

==== Radio ====
Over 30 FM and 20 AM radio stations broadcast in the Kansas City area, with stations from Topeka, St. Joseph and Carrollton also reaching into the metropolitan area. The highest-rated radio stations, according to Arbitron are:

- WHB (810 AM) - Sports, ESPN Radio Affiliate
- KPRS (103.3 FM) – Urban
- KCMO-FM (94.9) – Classic Hits
- KQRC (98.9 FM) – Rock
- KFNZ (610 AM) and KFNZ-FM (96.5) – Sports, Kansas City Chiefs and Kansas City Royals flagship
- KMBZ (98.1 FM) – News/Talk
- WDAF-FM (106.5) – Country
- KZPT (99.7) - Adult Top 40
- KMXV (93.3) - Top 40
- KFKF (94.1) - Country
- KCFX (101.1) - Classic Rock
- KCMO (710 AM) and KCHZ (95.7 FM) – Talk

===== Public and community radio =====
- KCUR (89.3 FM) – NPR affiliate
- KANU-FM (91.5) and KTBG (90.9 FM) – both college radio stations; also NPR affiliates
- KKFI (90.1 FM) – Locally owned not-for-profit station
- KGSP (1480 FM) – Park University college station

===== Specialty radio =====
Hispanics, who account for 8% of the market's population, are specifically served by three AM radio stations who broadcast in Spanish:

- KCZZ (1480 AM) – Spanish Sports (ESPN Deportes) talk
- KDTD (1340 AM) – Mexican regional
- KYYS (1250 AM) – Classic hits

== Natural environment ==
The USDA provides estimates of the number of trees by county in the Kansas City metropolitan area.

- Cass County, MO: 43,740,000
- Miami County, KS: 38,700,000
- Leavenworth County, KS: 33,210,000
- Jackson County, MO: 32,540,000
- Clay County, MO: 26,940,000
- Johnson County, KS: 25,490,000
- Ray County, MO: 22,710,000
- Platte County, MO: 19,590,000
- Wyandotte County, KS: 6,530,000
- Total: 249,450,000

The five most common species in the region's urban and rural forest were American elm (28.9%), northern hackberry (14.0%), Osage-orange (7.2%), honeylocust (6.7%), and eastern redcedar (5.0%).

== Local organizations ==
- Irish Museum and Cultural Center
- Congregation Beth Israel Abraham Voliner

== Notable people ==
Many notable people through history were born in, or moved to, what is now the Kansas City metropolitan area.

The list from Kansas City, Missouri includes these: cartoonists Walt Disney, Friz Freleng, and Ub Iwerks; musicians Count Basie, Melissa Etheridge, Tech N9ne, and Eminem; Representative Emanuel Cleaver and historical city boss Tom Pendergast; actors Ellie Kemper, Don Cheadle, and Jason Sudeikis; reporter Walter Cronkite; pilot Amelia Earhart; and writer Ernest Hemingway. The list from Kansas City, Kansas includes actors Eric Stonestreet, Scott Foley, and Tuc Watkins; singer and actor Janelle Monáe; Kermit the Frog puppeteer Matt Vogel; West Side Story cinematographer Daniel L. Fapp; Marvel Comics writer Jason Aaron; sculptor and pioneering black pilot Ed Dwight Jr.; Negro leagues player Ed Dwight Sr.; and mass murderer Richard Hickock.

The list from Independence, Missouri includes President Harry S. Truman, Guns N' Roses keyboardist Chris Pitman, actor Arliss Howard, Devo co-founder Bob Lewis, self-freed slave and Oregon Trail pioneer Hiram Young, Pulitzer Prize-winning historian David McCullough, actor Ginger Rogers, fantasy novelist Margaret Weis, television series creator Paul Henning, and black female Civil War soldier Cathay Williams.

From Overland Park, Kansas, this includes film directors Michael Almereyda (Hamlet) and Darren Lynn Bousman (Saw), actors Rob Riggle and Tom Kane, economist and writer Michael R. Strain, and eSports player Johnathan Wendel. From Lenexa, Kansas, this includes actors Paul Rudd and Jason Wiles, gunfighter Wild Bill Hickok, and autism researcher William Shaw. From Olathe, Kansas, this includes George Washington Carver. From Lee's Summit, this includes Bob, Cole, Jim, and John of the James–Younger Gang.

== See also ==
- List of metropolitan areas of Missouri
