= National Register of Historic Places listings in Jackson County, Missouri =

Location of Jackson County in Missouri

This is a list of the National Register of Historic Places listings in Jackson County, Missouri.

This is intended to be a complete list of the properties and districts on the National Register of Historic Places in Jackson County, Missouri, United States. Latitude and longitude coordinates are provided for many National Register properties and districts; these locations may be seen together in a map.

There are 388 properties and districts listed on the National Register in the county, including 4 National Historic Landmarks and 1 National Historic Site. The portion of Kansas City in the county is the location of 336 of these properties and districts; they are listed separately, while the remaining 52 properties and districts, including all of National Historic Landmarks and the National Historic Site, are listed below.

This National Park Service list is complete through NPS recent listings posted October 16, 2026.

== Current listings ==
=== Exclusive of Kansas City ===
	Name on the Register	Image	Date listed	Location	City or town	Description
1	Bailey Family Farm Historic District	Bailey Family Farm Historic District	July 3, 2006 (#06000537)	SW corner of Bailey and Ranson Rds. 38°53′45″N 94°20′29″W	Lee's Summit	
2	Bayles Addition Historic District	Bayles Addition Historic District	February 13, 2013 (#13000003)	Bounded by SW. Jefferson, SW. 3rd, SW. 5th, SW. 4th & SW. Walnut Sts. 38°54′36″N 94°22′57″W	Lee's Summit	
3	Bingham-Waggoner House and Estate	Bingham-Waggoner House and Estate	May 22, 1980 (#80002360)	313 W. Pacific Ave. 39°05′07″N 94°25′11″W	Independence	
4	Blue Mills		April 21, 1994 (#94000323)	3101 Lentz Rd. 39°09′28″N 94°18′34″W	Independence	
5	Dr. John S. Jr. and Harriet Smart Bryant House	Dr. John S. Jr. and Harriet Smart Bryant House	May 21, 1992 (#92000582)	519 S. Main St. 39°05′13″N 94°24′56″W	Independence	
6	Andrew Drumm Institute	Andrew Drumm Institute	November 3, 2006 (#06001014)	3210 Lee's Summit Rd. 39°03′48″N 94°23′38″W	Independence	
7	Englewood Theatre		January 29, 2026 (#100012640)	10917 E. Winner Rd. 39°05′15″N 94°26′55″W	Independence	
8	Fort Osage	Fort Osage	October 15, 1966 (#66000418)	N edge of Sibley on the Missouri River; 39°11′13″N 94°11′31″W	Sibley	
9	Fort Osage Archeological District		March 17, 1972 (#72000720)	Address Restricted	Sibley	
10	Todd M. George Sr. House	Todd M. George Sr. House	February 12, 2010 (#10000007)	408 SE 3rd St. 38°54′51″N 94°22′17″W	Lee's Summit	
11	John and Adele Georgen House	John and Adele Georgen House	May 11, 2000 (#00000486)	933 S. Main St. 39°04′49″N 94°24′54″W	Independence	
12	German Evangelical Pastors' Home Historic District	German Evangelical Pastors' Home Historic District	October 13, 1988 (#88001856)	1808-1812 W. Walnut and 300-311 19th Terrace; 39°00′57″N 94°17′12″W	Blue Springs	
13	Grandview Residential Historic District		November 15, 2005 (#05001284)	807-1111 Highgrove Rd., 13016-13020 and 13019 Grandview Rd. and 13006-13018 10th St. 38°53′24″N 94°31′59″W	Grandview	
14	Howard Neighborhood Historic District	Howard Neighborhood Historic District	July 3, 2007 (#07000651)	Roughly bounded by SE 5th St., SE Green St., SE 7th St., and SE Miller St. 38°54′31″N 94°22′23″W	Lee's Summit	
15	Mollie and Josephine Hughes House	Mollie and Josephine Hughes House	April 7, 1994 (#94000289)	801 S. Main St. 39°05′02″N 94°24′54″W	Independence	
16	Jackson County Courthouse	Jackson County Courthouse	October 18, 1972 (#72000713)	Bounded by Lexington and Maple Aves. and Liberty and Main Sts. 39°05′33″N 94°24′59″W	Independence	
17	Jackson County Jail and Marshal's House	Jackson County Jail and Marshal's House	June 15, 1970 (#70000333)	217 N. Main St. 39°05′36″N 94°24′55″W	Independence	
18	Lewis Jones House	Lewis Jones House	April 21, 1994 (#94000320)	104 Elizabeth St. 39°06′22″N 94°24′54″W	Independence	
19	Lee's Summit Christian Church Building	Lee's Summit Christian Church Building	April 20, 2011 (#11000213)	SE Douglas and SE Fourth Sts. 38°54′40″N 94°22′31″W	Lee's Summit	
20	Kritser House	Kritser House	April 10, 1985 (#85000734)	115 E. Walnut; 39°05′22″N 94°24′53″W	Independence	
21	Lee's Summit Downtown Historic District	Lee's Summit Downtown Historic District	August 17, 2005 (#05000889)	Roughly bounded by Second St., Douglas St., Fourth St., and Market St. 38°54′48″N 94°22′36″W	Lee's Summit	
22	Lee's Summit Post Office		August 23, 2018 (#100002426)	210 SW Market St. 38°54′43″N 94°22′45″W	Lee's Summit	
23	Lewis-Webb House	Lewis-Webb House	February 6, 1986 (#86000154)	302 W. Mill; 39°06′00″N 94°25′06″W	Independence	
24	Longview Farm	Longview Farm	October 24, 1985 (#85003378)	11700 and 850 S.W. Longview Rd. 38°54′20″N 94°26′49″W	Lee's Summit	
25	Charles Minor House	Charles Minor House	March 22, 1984 (#84002573)	314 N. Spring St. 39°05′40″N 94°25′11″W	Independence	
26	Missouri Pacific Depot	Missouri Pacific Depot	January 22, 1979 (#79001365)	600 S. Grand; 39°05′12″N 94°25′45″W	Independence	
27	Morningside Acres Historic Ranch House District	Morningside Acres Historic Ranch House District	February 3, 2012 (#11001083)	Roughly 600 block east of Independence Ave. between SE 3rd Terrace & SE 5th St. 38°54′44″N 94°21′56″W	Lee's Summit	part of the Lee's Summit, Missouri Multiple Property Submission
28	Mount Washington School	Mount Washington School	April 23, 2013 (#13000192)	570 S. Evanston Ave. 39°06′13″N 94°27′46″W	Independence	
29	Smallwood V. Noland House	Smallwood V. Noland House	April 21, 1994 (#94000319)	1024 S. Forest St. 39°04′54″N 94°26′13″W	Independence	
30	Northeast Douglas Street Residential Historic District	Northeast Douglas Street Residential Historic District	August 27, 2008 (#08000803)	NE Douglas St. roughly between Elm and Maggie Sts. 38°55′12″N 94°22′48″W	Lee's Summit	
31	Northeast Forest Avenue and Northeast Green Street Residential Historic District	Northeast Forest Avenue and Northeast Green Street Residential Historic District	August 27, 2008 (#08000804)	108, 110, 114 NE Forest Ave. and 310, 312 NE Green St. 38°55′12″N 94°22′40″W	Lee's Summit	
32	Northeast Green and 1st Streets Residential Historic District	Northeast Green and 1st Streets Residential Historic District	August 27, 2008 (#08000805)	Roughly bounded by NE Douglas St., Maple St., 1st St., and NE Johnson St. 38°55′00″N 94°22′37″W	Lee's Summit	
33	Overfelt-Campbell-Johnston House	Overfelt-Campbell-Johnston House	September 5, 1975 (#75001066)	305 S. Pleasant St. 39°05′23″N 94°25′15″W	Independence	
34	Owens-McCoy House	Owens-McCoy House	April 21, 1994 (#94000321)	410 W. Farmer Ave. 39°05′46″N 94°25′12″W	Independence	
35	Rice-Tremonti House	Rice-Tremonti House	March 2, 1979 (#79001376)	8801 E. 66th St. 39°00′14″N 94°28′54″W	Raytown	
36	Saint Paul's Episcopal Church	Saint Paul's Episcopal Church	October 3, 1985 (#85002720)	Fifth and S. Green Sts. 38°54′39″N 94°22′21″W	Lee's Summit	
37	Santa Fe Trail-Santa Fe Trail Park, Independence Trail Segments		April 21, 1994 (#94000322)	Santa Fe Rd. 39°03′56″N 94°25′35″W	Independence	
38	Sherwood Manufacturing Company Building	Sherwood Manufacturing Company Building	October 28, 2010 (#10000204)	123 SE 3rd St. 38°54′46″N 94°22′29″W	Lee's Summit	part of the Lee's Summit, Missouri Multiple Property Submission
39	Southeast Grand Avenue and Fifth Street Residential Historic District	Southeast Grand Avenue and Fifth Street Residential Historic District	April 20, 2011 (#11000216)	Roughly the east side of SE Grand Ave. between SE 4th St. and SE 5th St. and the north side of SE 5th St. between SE Grand Ave. and SE Howard St. 38°54′38″N 94°22′20″W	Lee's Summit	part of the Lee's Summit, Missouri Multiple Property Submission
40	Southeast Green Street Historic Cottage District	Southeast Green Street Historic Cottage District	October 14, 2010 (#10000837)	311-330, and 400 and 401 SE Green St. 38°54′44″N 94°22′26″W	Lee's Summit	part of the Lee's Summit, Missouri Multiple Property Submission
41	Southeast Third Street and Southeast Corder Avenue Ranch House Historic District	Southeast Third Street and Southeast Corder Avenue Ranch House Historic District	September 15, 2011 (#11000669)	Roughly the south side of Southeast 3rd. St. east of Independence Ave.; along Southeast Corder Ave. north of Southeast 4th St.; and five lots on the east side of Southeast Corder Ave. south of 4th St. 38°54′43″N 94°22′05″W	Lee's Summit	part of the Lee's Summit, Missouri Multiple Property Submission
42	Southeast Third Street Residential Historic District	Southeast Third Street Residential Historic District	October 14, 2010 (#10000838)	Roughly the 400 block of SE Third St. between SE Grand and SE Howard Sts. 38°54′50″N 94°22′17″W	Lee's Summit	part of the Lee's Summit, Missouri Multiple Property Submission
43	Southwest Market Street Historic District	Southwest Market Street Historic District	February 27, 2013 (#13000038)	314 through 418 SW Market St. 38°54′34″N 94°22′39″W	Lee's Summit	
44	Southwest Third and Southwest Madison Historic District	Southwest Third and Southwest Madison Historic District	February 13, 2013 (#13000004)	202 through 300 SW. 3rd St. 38°54′40″N 94°22′55″W	Lee's Summit	
45	Temple Site	Temple Site	September 22, 1970 (#70000334)	Lexington Ave. and River Boulevard; 39°05′29″N 94°25′31″W	Independence	
46	Trinity Episcopal Church	Trinity Episcopal Church	April 27, 1979 (#79001366)	409 N. Liberty St. 39°05′41″N 94°24′59″W	Independence	
47	Harry S. Truman Historic District	Harry S. Truman Historic District	November 11, 1971 (#71001066)	N. Delaware St. area 39°05′47″N 94°25′22″W	Independence	
48	Harry S Truman National Historic Site	Harry S Truman National Historic Site	May 31, 1985 (#85001248)	219 N. Delaware St.; also 601 and 605 W. Truman Rd. and 216 N. Delaware St. 39°05′36″N 94°25′23″W	Independence	Second set of addresses represents a boundary increase of February 23, 2005
49	Unity School of Christianity Historic District	Unity School of Christianity Historic District	April 12, 1989 (#89000246)	Junction of US 50 and Colborn Rd. 38°56′49″N 94°24′21″W	Unity Village	
50	Harvey M. Vaile Mansion	Harvey M. Vaile Mansion	October 1, 1969 (#69000108)	1500 N. Liberty St. 39°06′29″N 94°25′02″W	Independence	
51	Woodson-Sawyer House	Woodson-Sawyer House	March 20, 1986 (#86000457)	1604 W. Lexington; 39°05′14″N 94°26′04″W	Independence	
52	Solomon Young Farm-Harry S. Truman Farm	Solomon Young Farm-Harry S. Truman Farm	May 5, 1978 (#78001650)	12121 and 12301 Blue Ridge Extension; 38°54′08″N 94°31′51″W	Grandview	

== See also ==
- List of National Historic Landmarks in Missouri
- National Register of Historic Places listings in Missouri
