= Tanger Kansas City at Legends =

- Aerial image of the mall
- Location: Kansas City, Kansas, United States
- Coordinates: 39°07′34″N 94°49′34″W
- Address: 1843 Village West Parkway
- Opened: April 2006
- Previous names: The Legends at Village West (2006 - 2010); Legends Outlets Kansas City (2010-2025)
- Developer: RED Development
- Manager: Tanger Inc.
- Owner: Tanger Inc.
- Num. of stores: 110
- Num. of anchor tenants: 6
- Floor area: 1,200,000 square feet (110,000 m^{2})
- Floors: 2
- Website: https://www.tanger.com/kansascity

Tanger Kansas City at Legends (formerly The Legends at Village West and Legends Outlets Kansas City), is a super-regional shopping mall located in the Village West development in Kansas City, Kansas. The mall has a gross leasable area of roughly 700,000 square feet (65,000 m^{2}).

The shopping center is surrounded by various attractions and offers over 110 retail and restaurant outlets, including Dave & Buster's and Yard House. Popular department stores include Tory Burch, Michael Kors, Ann Taylor, Kate Spade, Nike, TJ Maxx, and H&M.

Tanger Kansas City at Legends honors Kansas legends in athletics, politics, science, art, and other fields. The theme is interwoven throughout the facility and offers information about Kansas’ history and heritage. Each corridor and courtyard is dedicated to a particular category of famous Kansans or aspect of the state’s history, such as a replica of The Wizard of Oz's Yellow Brick Road.

In 2012, the mall went into foreclosure. After being repurchased by original developer Dan Lowe, it was renamed Legends Outlets Kansas City.

In September 2025, Tanger acquired the Legends Outlets Kansas City and rebranded the outlet mall as Tanger Kansas City at Legends.

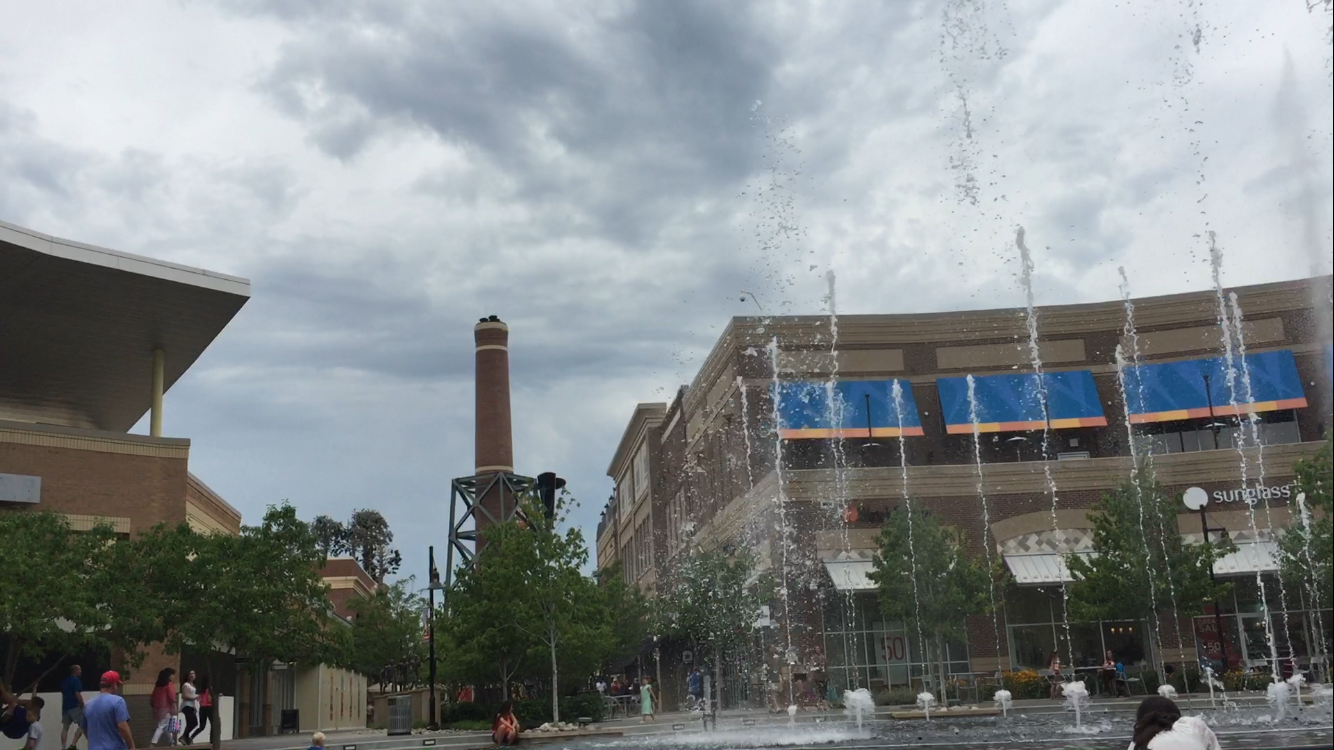
The malls fountain located in one of the center courts of the mall
