= Summit Fair =

Coordinates: 38°55′44″N 94°24′32″W

- Location: Lee's Summit, Missouri, United States
- Opened: 2009
- Num. of stores: ~50
- Num. of anchor tenants: 4
- Floor area: 500,000 square feet (46,000 m^{2})
- Floors: 1

Summit Fair is a 500,000 square foot open-air lifestyle center that opened in 2009. It is located in Lee's Summit, Missouri. It has approximately 50 shops. The design of Summit Fair features a Main Street shopping area with beautiful landscaping and pedestrian walkways.

== Anchors ==
- Dick's Sporting Goods
- DSW
- JCPenney
- Macy's (Closing 2022)

== See also ==
- Summit Woods Crossing
