= Harry S. Truman Farm Home =

Historic house in Missouri, United States

- Solomon Young Farm-Harry S. Truman Farm
- U.S. National Register of Historic Places
- U.S. National Historic Landmark District
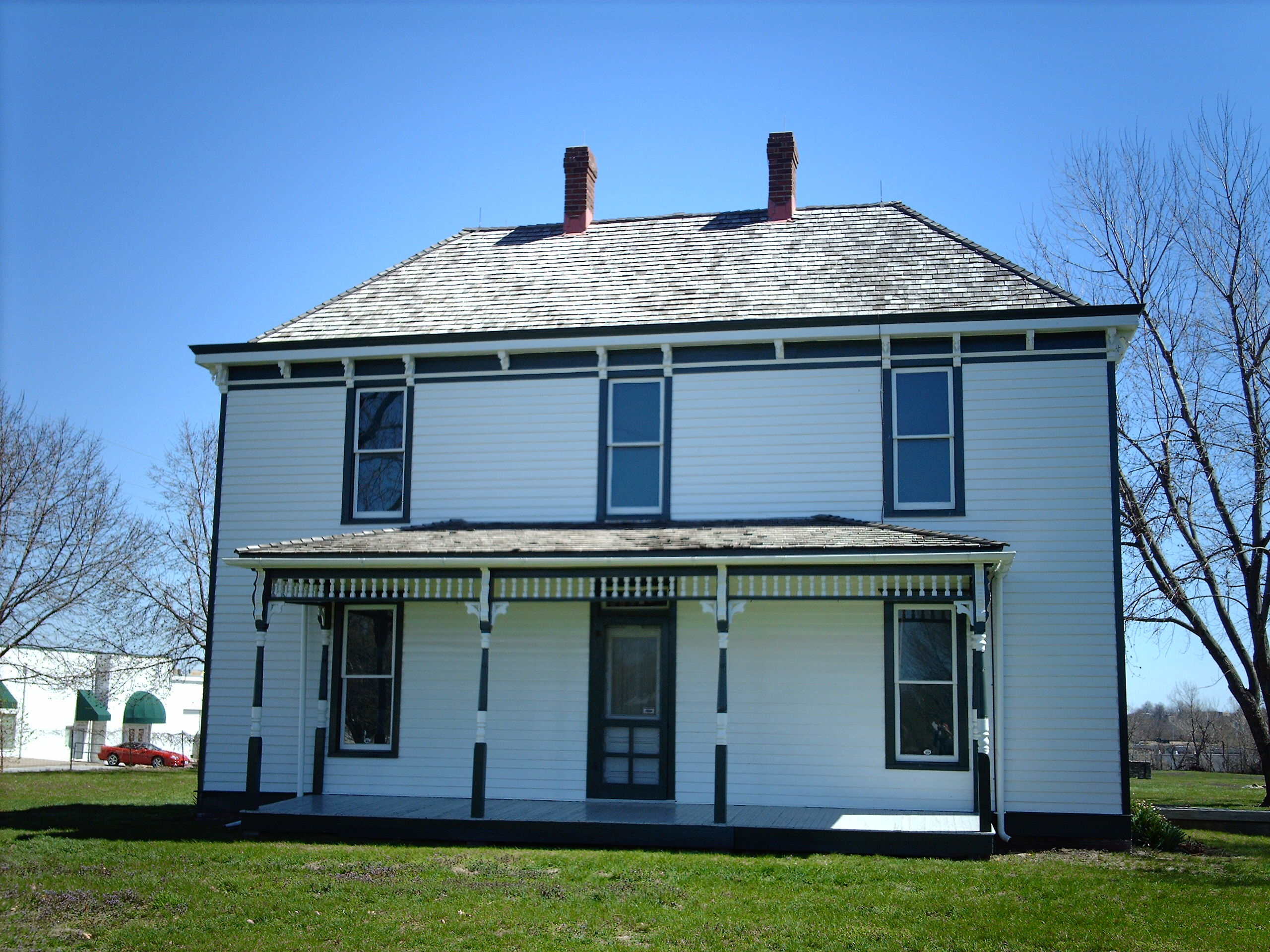

- Location within Missouri Location within the United States
- Location: Grandview, Missouri
- Coordinates: 38°54′8″N 94°31′51″W
- Area: 5.2 acres (2.1 ha)
- Built: 1867
- Architect: Solomon Young, Harriet Louisa (Gregg) Young
- NRHP reference No.: 78001650

Significant dates
- Added to NRHP: May 5, 1978
- Designated NHLD: February 4, 1985

The Harry S. Truman Farm Home, also known as the Solomon Young Farm, is a historic farm property at 12301 Blue Ridge Blvd in Grandview, Missouri. The farm property, first developed in the 1860s, was the residence of future U.S. president Harry S. Truman from 1906 to 1917. The house is part of Harry S. Truman National Historic Site, and is a designated National Historic Landmark.

== Description and history ==
The Truman Farm Home is located in a commercially developed area of Grandview, between Blue Ridge Boulevard and Interstate 49. The site consists of a farm house (built in 1894-95 after the 1867 house was destroyed by fire); a reconstructed smokehouse; the Grandview post office-turned-garage (Truman moved it to the farm to store his 1911 Stafford automobile); a restored box wagon once used on the farm; and several stone fence posts marking the original boundaries of the farm, plus other original and reconstructed buildings.

The farmhouse was built in 1894 by Harry Truman's maternal grandmother, Harriet Louisa Gregg, and is the centerpiece of a 5.25-acre (2.12 ha) remnant of the family's former 600-acre (240 ha) farm. Truman worked the farm from 1906-1917, when he was 22 years old until he was 33. It was here, said Truman's mother Martha, that Harry got his "common sense". After his grandmother died, ownership of the property was contested by her heirs, the costs of which eventually forced Martha out of the house in 1940. The President was eventually able to recover much of the property, and considered it a desirable place to establish his presidential library. This did not happen, and Truman sold off most of the land for development in the 1950s.

A surviving 10-acre (4.0 ha) part of the Truman farm is now owned by the National Park Service, forming part of the Harry S. Truman National Historic Site. There is no visitor center on the site, but the grounds are open for self-guided tours and an audio tour is available. Guided tours were formerly conducted during the summer, but were cancelled in 2013 due to sequestration-related budget cuts.

== See also ==
- List of National Historic Landmarks in Missouri
- National Register of Historic Places listings in Jackson County, Missouri
