= Walton Construction =

Privately owned construction company, in Kansas City, Missouri

In 1985, Greg Walton founded 'Walton Construction Company', a privately owned construction company, in Kansas City, Missouri. Walton's first major project in Kansas City, MO was the Bartle Hall Convention Center (completed in 1994, total construction cost was $91.7 million). Within the following two decades, Walton became one of the top 100 general contractors in the United States, according to Engineering News Record, with annual revenue exceeding $800 million. Among the major projects Walton Construction has worked on are the Legends at Village West in Wyandotte County, Kansas, and the Zona Rosa mixed use development, along with many others. Along with having its headquarters in Kansas City, Walton Construction held divisional offices in several U.S. cities including:

- Dallas, Texas
- New Orleans, Louisiana
- Shreveport, Louisiana
- Springfield, Missouri
- St. Louis, Missouri

After its 25th anniversary, the corporate leadership structure of Walton Construction changed. William G. Petty ("Bill") took over as chief executive officer (CEO) and then moved the headquarters from Kansas City to New Orleans in mid-2010. Petty also maintained its divisional office in New Orleans that focused upon large federal and military construction projects throughout the U.S. The company eventually changed the name from Walton Construction Company to WCC Companies after Petty sold certain assets to Core Construction, based out of Phoenix, Arizona.

In August 2012, Petty, who still owns the majority of WCC, formed The WGP Companies: WGP Associates, LLC (a management consulting firm) and WGP Construction, LLC (a general contractor). The WGP Companies specializes in federal construction contracting, complex surety-default projects, and disaster recovery projects. The companies [headquartered in New Orleans, Louisiana] operate within the Continental United States (CONUS) and Outside the Continental United States (OCONUS) performing work in Christchurch, New Zealand, Manila, Philippines, and Guantanamo Bay, Cuba.
