= Village West =

Retail and cultural center in Kansas City, Kansas, U.S.

Coordinates: 39°07′00″N 94°50′02″W

Village West is a $1.2 billion 1,500-acre (6.1 km^{2}) retail, dining and entertainment development that opened in 2002 in Kansas City, Kansas. It is located at the intersection of Interstates 70 and 435 (11 miles (18 km) from Downtown KCK). Village West is the most popular tourist destination in the state, and has significantly fueled growth in KCK and Wyandotte County.

== Attractions ==
- Kansas Speedway
- Hollywood Casino at Kansas Speedway
- Sporting Park, home to Sporting Kansas City of Major League Soccer.
- Legends Field, home to the Kansas City Monarchs of the American Association.
- Dave & Buster's

=== Former attractions ===
- Schlitterbahn Kansas City, a resort and waterpark billed as the largest entertainment project in Kansas history, opened across I-435 from Village West in 2009. The park closed in 2018.

== Shopping ==
- Legends Outlets Kansas City, a large lifestyle center with shops, restaurants and entertainment
- Cabela's outdoor outfitter
- Nebraska Furniture Mart

== Lodging ==
- Great Wolf Lodge, Indoor Waterpark And Resort
- Chateau Avalon, a luxury bed and breakfast.
- Hampton Inn
