= Harry S. Truman Historic District =

Historic district in Missouri, United States

- U.S. National Register of Historic Places
- U.S. National Historic Landmark District
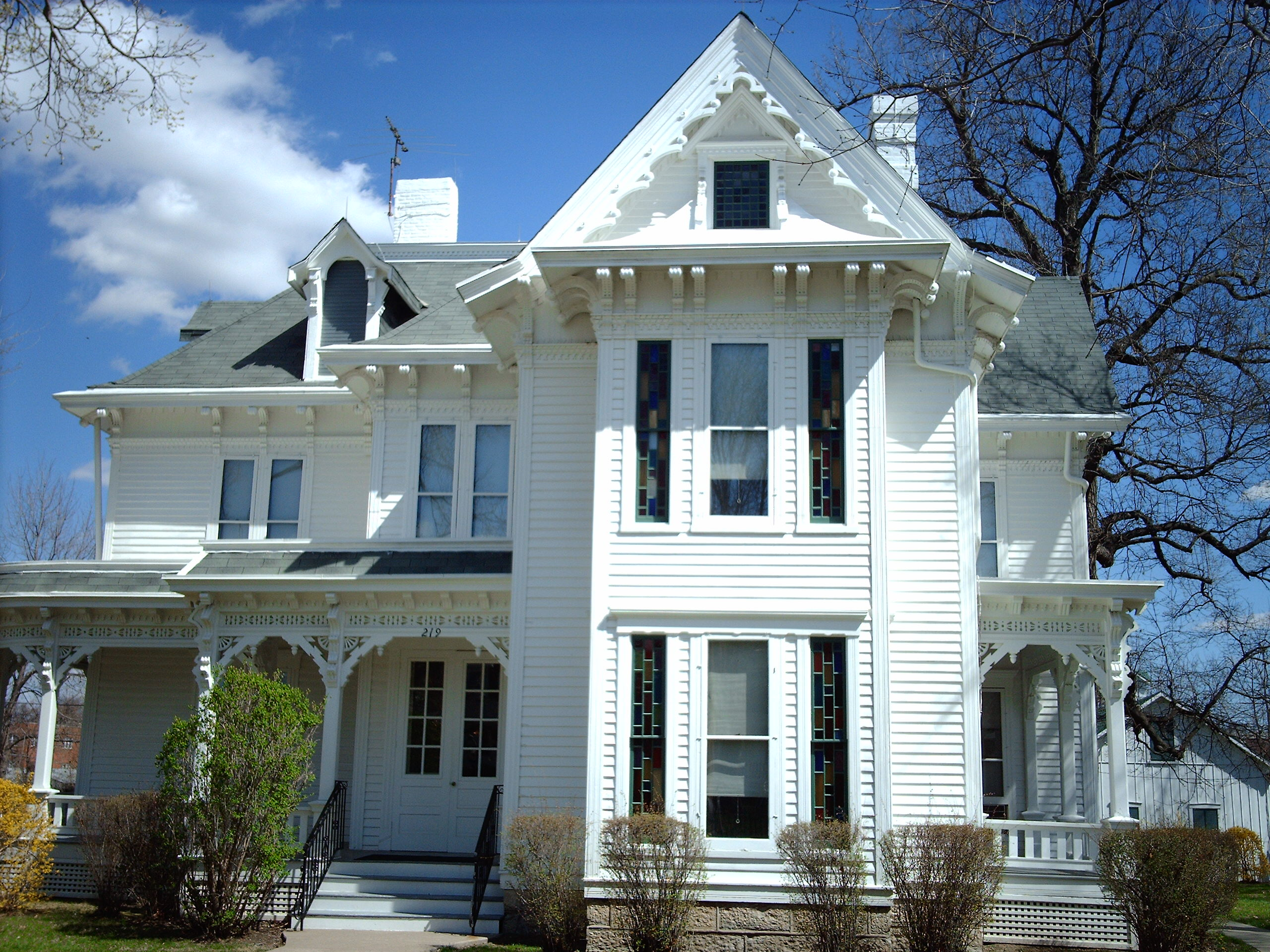
- Interactive map showing the location of Harry S. Truman Historic District
- Location: Independence, Missouri
- Coordinates: 39°5′47″N 94°25′22″W
- Area: 153 acres (62 ha) (after 2011 increase)
- Built: 1867–1895
- Architectural style: Late Victorian
- NRHP reference No.: 71001066

Significant dates
- Added to NRHP: November 11, 1971
- Boundary increase: July 13, 2011
- Designated NHLD: November 11, 1974

The Harry S. Truman Historic District is a National Historic Landmark District encompassing sites closely associated with US President Harry S. Truman in Independence, Missouri. It includes the Truman Home at 219 North Delaware, Truman's home for much of his adult life and now a centerpiece of the Harry S. Truman National Historic Site, and the Truman Presidential Library. The district was listed on the National Register of Historic Places in 1971, and was designated a National Historic Landmark in 1974. When first listed, the district included only the two buildings and a corridor joining them. It was substantially enlarged in 2011 to include more sites and the environment in which Truman operated while living in Independence.

== History ==
Wallace House (also called the Truman Home), 219 North Delaware Street, Independence, Missouri, was the home of Harry S. Truman, on-and-off, after his marriage to Bess Wallace, on June 28, 1919, until his death on December 26, 1972. Bess Truman's maternal grandfather, George Porterfield Gates, built the house over a period of years from 1867 to 1895.

Bess's mother, Madge Gates Wallace, wanted the couple to live there with her. Bess had lived with her mother after Bess's father, David Willock Wallace, committed suicide in 1903, both of them moving in with Madge's parents. Also in 1919, Harry was putting all of his money into the men's clothing store of Truman & Jacobson open at 104 West 12th St. in downtown Kansas City, so living at the Wallace home made good financial sense.

After the haberdashery failed, in 1922, Harry and Bess could not afford to move to a new home. So they would continue living there while Harry paid off the debts from the store. That same year he went into politics, and would eventually move to Washington, D.C. Whenever they came back to Missouri, the Wallace House was their home.

The Trumans' only child Mary Margaret was born in the home on February 17, 1924. The site also includes the two adjacent homes of Mrs. Truman's brothers, and, across Delaware Street, the home of the President's favorite aunt and cousins. Guided tours of the site are conducted, and a visitor center is housed in a nearby historic firehouse.

After he retired in 1953, until the Truman Library was opened on July 6, 1957, the Wallace House was also his office.

Truman is one of the few Presidents who never owned a home. He would live with family members in his early life, then the Wallace House, rented apartments and houses in Washington (including 4701 Connecticut Avenue), Blair House (the official state visitors' residence), and the White House, but never a house that he had purchased.

== Gallery ==
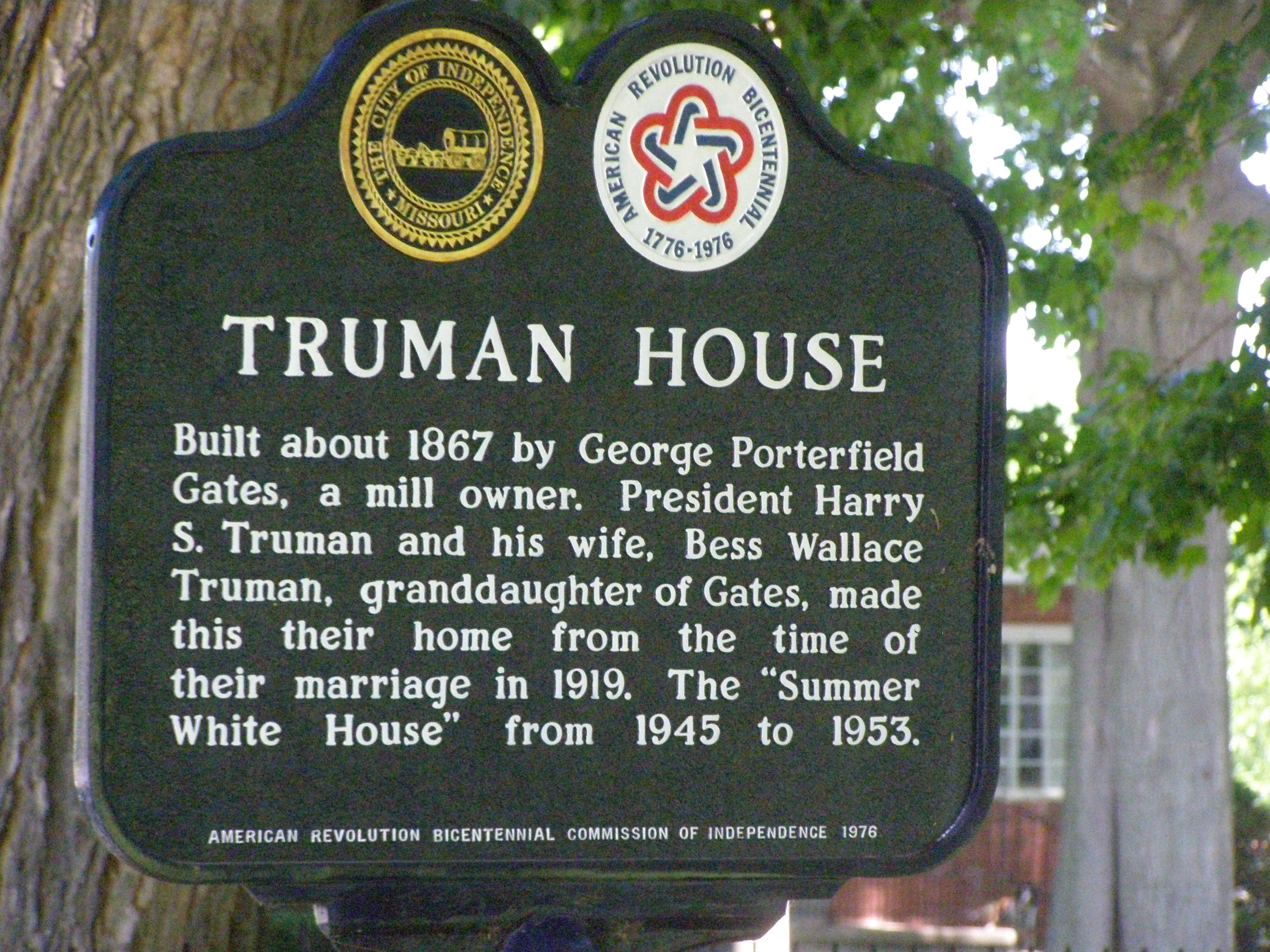
Historic marker of Truman house, 2012

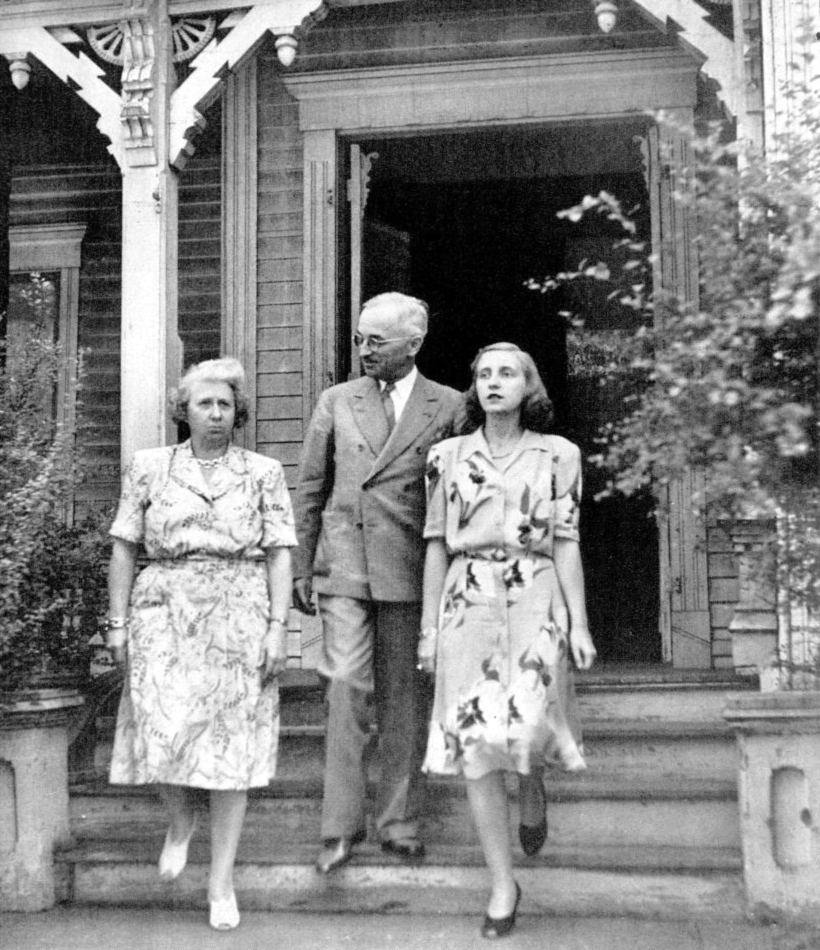
Truman family at Truman house, 1944

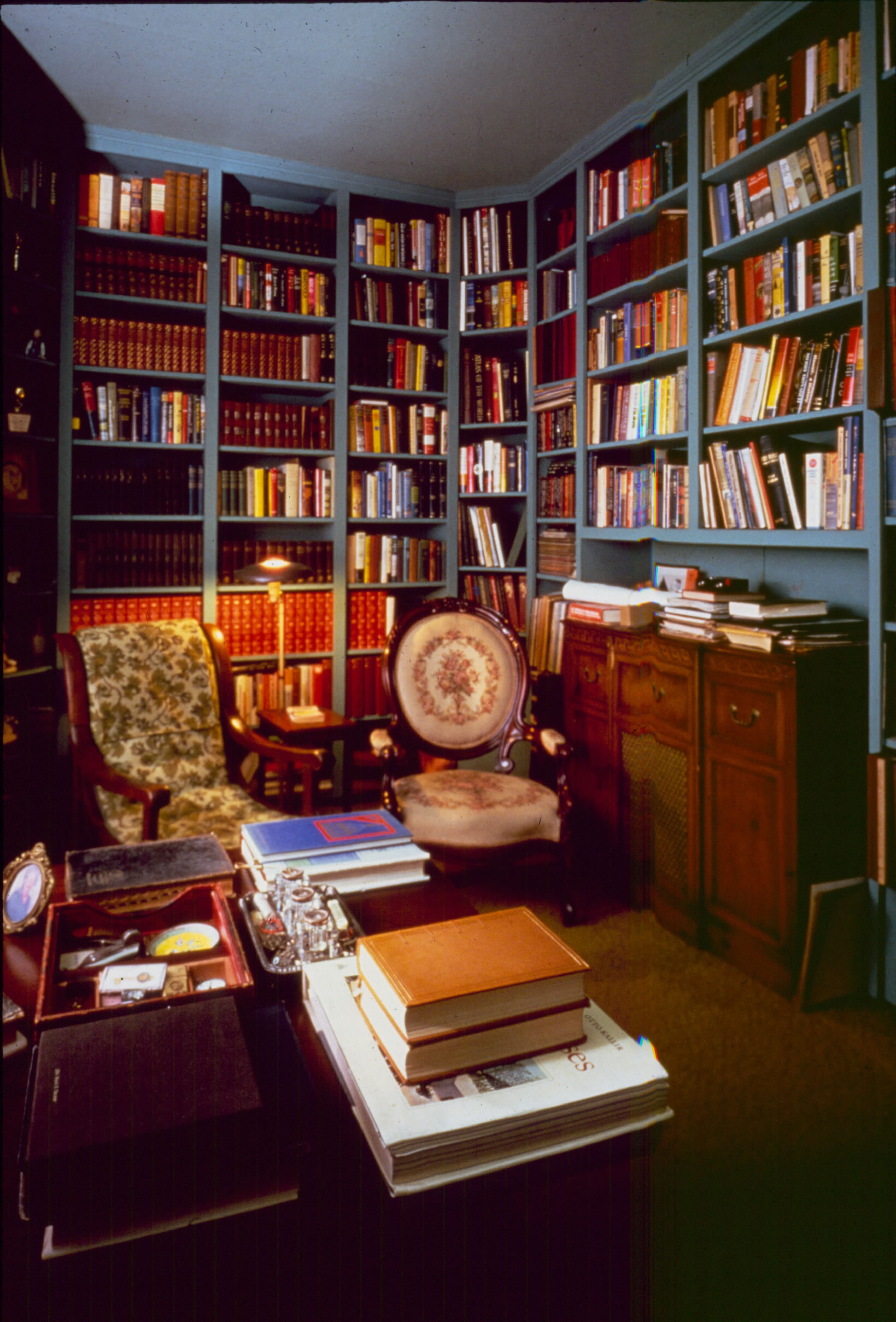
The study at Truman house

== See also ==
- List of National Historic Landmarks in Missouri
- National Register of Historic Places listings in Jackson County, Missouri
