= Kritser House =

Historic house in Missouri, United States

- U.S. National Register of Historic Places
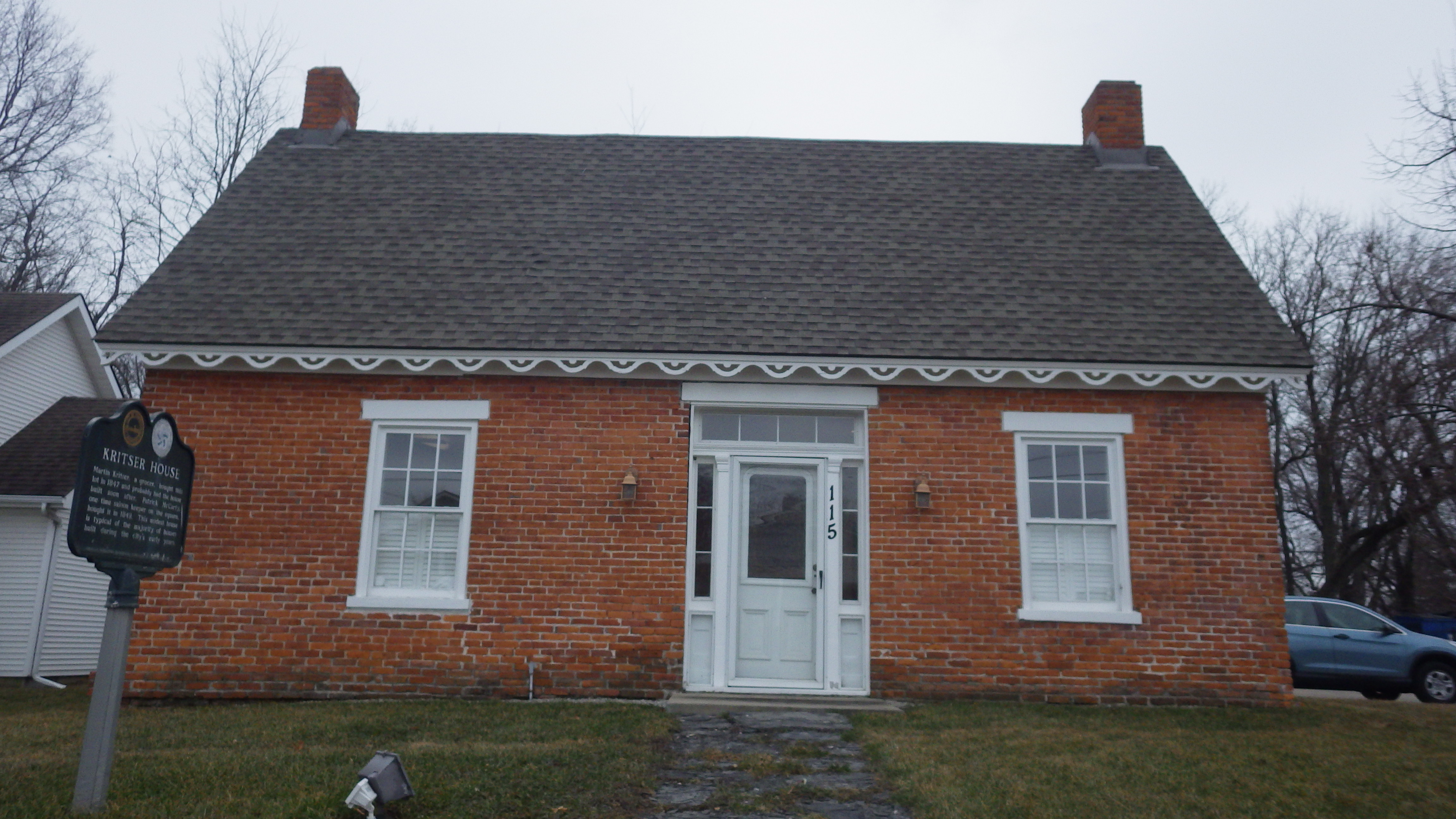

- Location within Missouri Location within the United States
- Location: 115 E. Walnut; Independence, Missouri
- Coordinates: 39°5′22″N 94°24′53″W
- Area: less than one acre
- Built: 1850
- NRHP reference No.: 85000734
- Added to NRHP: April 10, 1985

The Kritser House in Independence, Missouri is a building from 1850. It was listed on the National Register of Historic Places in 1985. It is found as significant for being associated with the life of Martin U. Kritser, a person significant to the history and development of the town. It is one of the few middle class residential structures of the American Mid-Victorian frontier architecture period left in Independence.
