= Overland Park Regional Medical Center =

- HCA Midwest Division
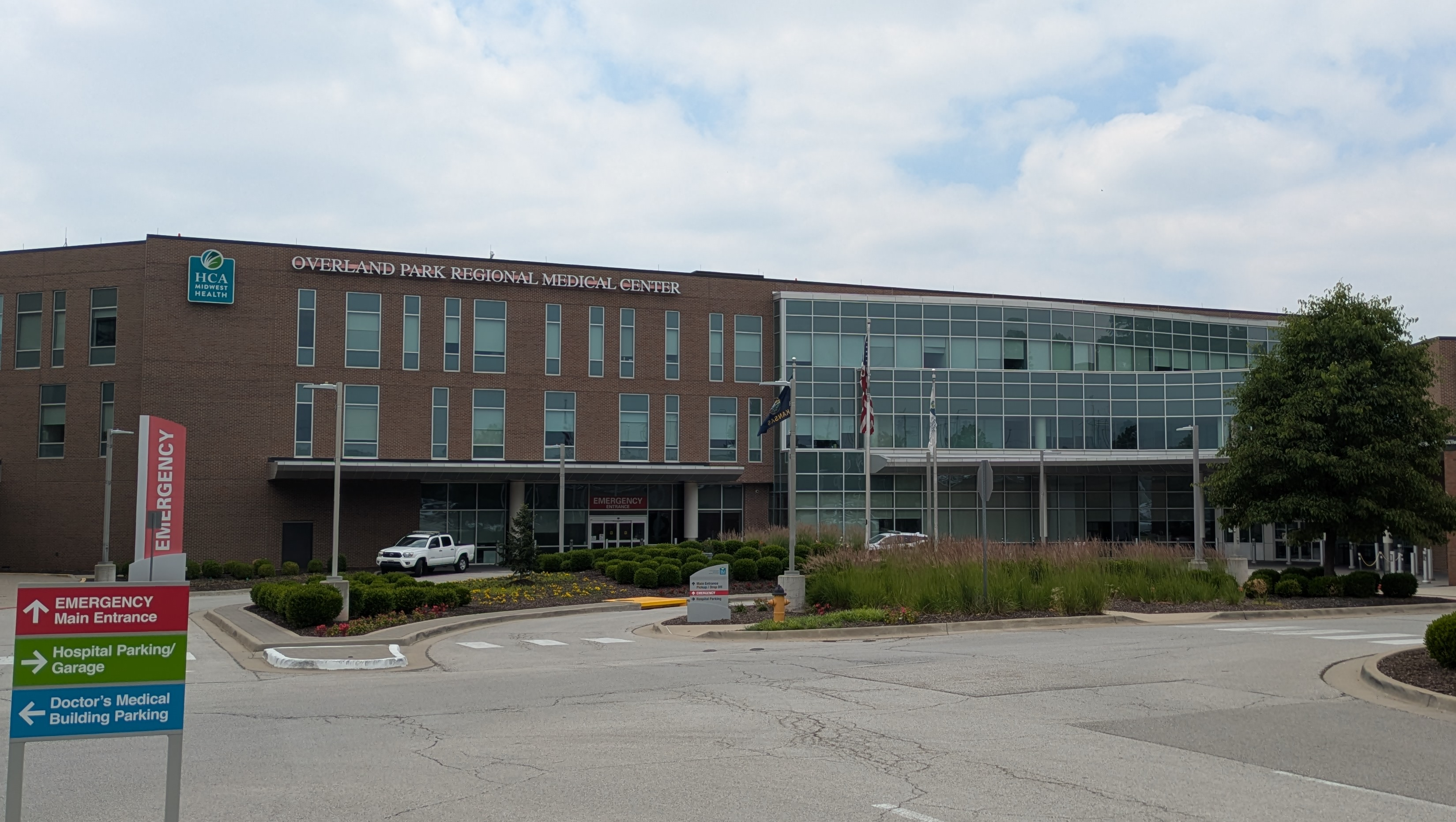
- Main and emergency department entrances in 2025

Geography
- Location: 10500 Quivira Road, Overland Park, Kansas, United States
- Coordinates: 38°56′15″N 94°43′36″W

Organization
- Network: HCA Midwest Division

Services
- Emergency department: Level II Trauma Center
- Beds: 343

Helipads
- Helipad: FAA LID: SN54

History
- Former names: Suburban Medical Center, Humana Hospital-Overland Park
- Founded: 1978

Links
- Website: hcamidwest.com/locations/overland-park-regional-medical-center/
- Lists: Hospitals in Kansas

Overland Park Regional Medical Center is a 343-bed acute care hospital located in Overland Park, Kansas. It is part of the HCA Midwest Division.

== History ==
Suburban Medical Center was originally established by Humana in December 1978. In 1993, Columbia/HCA acquired the hospital as part of its expansion into the Kansas City area. The company announced the facility would be renamed Overland Park Regional Medical Center and would undergo a $25 million expansion. In 1999, Columbia/HCA and Health Midwest entered discussions about a joint venture, which included the management of several local hospitals, including Overland Park Regional.

In 2002, HCA completed the acquisition of Health Midwest, bringing Overland Park Regional Medical Center under its ownership. In 2014, the hospital underwent a $120 million expansion, adding a new emergency department and trauma center, a three-story patient tower, and a new parking garage to support its growing patient base.

Dr. Raymond Brovont, an emergency department physician at Overland Park Regional, was dismissed by EmCare, the physician staffing group serving the hospital, in January 2017 after he raised concerns that the facility’s low physician staffing levels posed a risk to patient safety. In 2018, a jury awarded him a $29 million dollar judgment for wrongful termination, which was reduced on appeal to $26 million.

== Facilities ==
The campus includes the main hospital building, doctors' building, outpatient clinics, and a parking garage. Available facilities include an emergency department and level II trauma center, dedicated pediatric emergency department, catheterization laboratory, intensive care unit, labor and delivery, level III neonatal intensive care unit (NICU), and outpatient care.
