= Sheffield, Kansas City =

Neighborhood of Kansas City, Missouri

Coordinates: 39.106115°N 94.510787°W

Sheffield is a neighborhood of Kansas City, Missouri, United States.

A post office called Sheffield was established in 1888, and remained in operation until 1902. The community's name is a transfer from Sheffield, England.
