= Summit Woods Crossing =

Coordinates: 38°55′44″N 94°24′32″W

Summit Woods Crossing is an open air shopping center in Lee's Summit, Missouri which is located on US Hwy 50 at I-470. Summit Woods Crossing is across US 50 from Summit Fair. It opened in 2001.

== Anchors ==
- Super Target
- Petco
- Lowe's
- T.J. Maxx
- Dick's Sporting Goods
- Michaels
- Best Buy
- Kohl's
- Bed Bath & Beyond
- Pier 1 Imports
- OfficeMax
- Old Navy

== See also ==
- Summit Fair
