= Harry S. Truman National Historic Site =

National Historic Site of the United States in Missouri

- Harry S Truman National Historic Site
- U.S. National Register of Historic Places
- U.S. National Historic Site
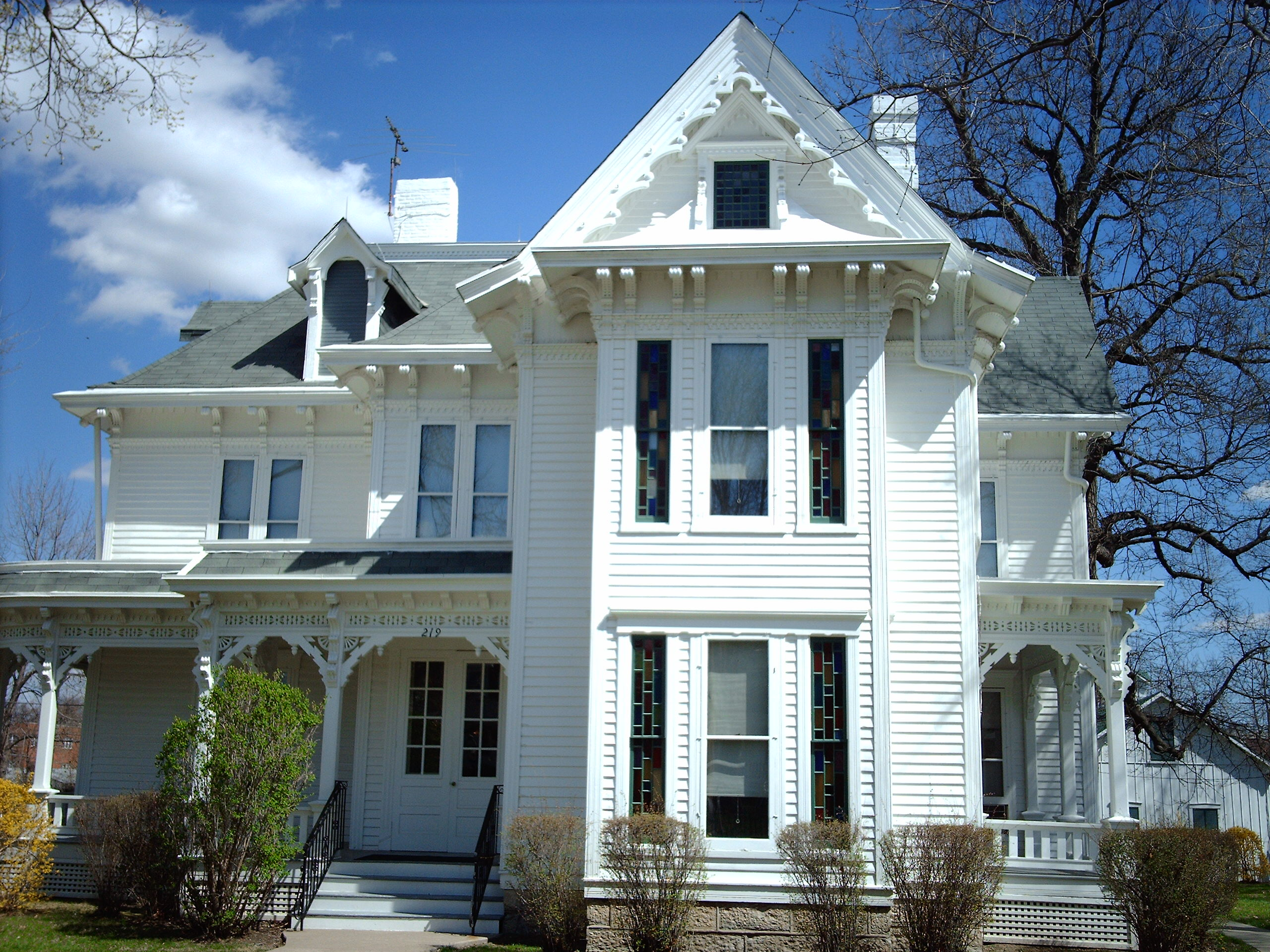
- Interactive map showing the location of Harry S. Truman National Historic Site
- Location: 219 N. Delaware St., Independence, Missouri
- Coordinates: 39°05′36″N 94°25′23″W
- Area: 0.8 acres (0.32 ha)
- Built by: George Porterfield Gates (1867 house); James W. Adams (1885 modification)
- Architect: James W. Adams (1885 modification)
- Architectural style: Gothic, Ecletic Victorian
- Visitation: 19,296 (2025)
- Website: www.nps.gov/hstr
- NRHP reference No.: 85001248
- Added to NRHP: May 31, 1985

The Harry S. Truman National Historic Site (officially styled without the period after the S) preserves the longtime home of Harry S. Truman, the 33rd president of the United States, as well as other properties associated with him in the Kansas City, Missouri metropolitan area. The site is operated by the National Park Service, with its centerpieces being the Truman Home in Independence and the Truman Farm Home in Grandview. It also includes the Noland home of Truman's cousins, and the George and Frank Wallace homes of Bess Truman's brothers. The site was designated a National Historic Site on May 23, 1983.

== Truman Home in Independence ==
The Truman Home (earlier known as the Gates–Wallace home), 219 North Delaware Street, Independence, Missouri, was the home of Harry S. Truman from the time of his marriage to Bess Wallace on June 28, 1919, until his death on December 26, 1972. Bess Truman's maternal grandfather, George Porterfield Gates, built the house between the years 1867 and 1885.

After Bess's father, David Willock Wallace, committed suicide in 1903, she and her mother and brothers moved into the house with Bess's grandparents, George and Elizabeth Gates. At the time Harry and Bess married in 1919, Harry was putting all of his money into his business partnership, a men's clothing store called Truman & Jacobson at 104 West 12th Street in downtown Kansas City, so living at the Wallace home made good financial sense.

After Truman's haberdashery failed in 1922, he and his wife continued to live in the house to save money while he paid his debts. After being elected to the Senate in 1935, he moved to Washington, D.C., with his wife and daughter. Whenever they came back to Missouri, the house at 219 N. Delaware was their home.

After he retired in 1953, until the Truman Library was opened on July 6, 1957, the Truman Home served as Truman's personal office. Bess lived in the home until her death in 1982, and she bequeathed the property to the National Park Service. The home was closed for 8 months in 2009-10 for a $1.1 million renovation that improved fire safety, visitor comfort and structural stability.

The Truman Home offers a glimpse at the personal life of the 33rd President of the United States, particularly the simple life the family enjoyed in Independence before and after Harry's eight years as president. The Trumans' only child, Mary Margaret, was born in the home on February 17, 1924. The site also includes the two adjacent homes of Mrs. Truman's brothers, and, across Delaware Street, the Noland Home, where the President's favorite aunt and cousins lived. The site operates a visitor center, located inside an historic firehouse, in downtown Independence. NPS park ranger-interpreters lead guided tours of the home on a regular basis, providing a look at the home much as the Truman family left it.

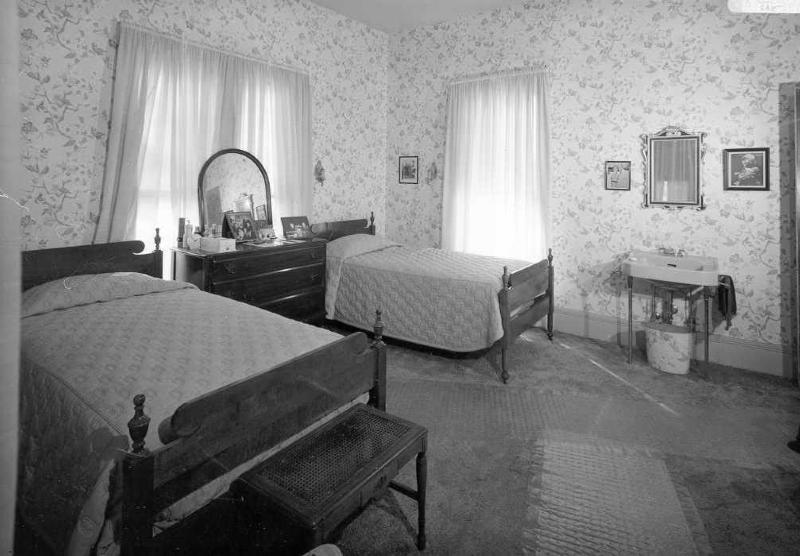
The second-floor bedroom of Harry and Bess Truman, in their home in Independence, Missouri.

The second floor of the home has never been open to the public – Bess wrote into her will that to protect her family's privacy, the second floor was to remain closed until the death of her daughter, Margaret. Though Margaret died in 2008, the NPS has maintained the closure in order to best preserve the home. A photo tour of the closed rooms, including Harry and Bess's bedroom, is available.

On display in the ground floor of the home is the Steinway piano Truman originally purchased as a Christmas present for Margaret, and which was played by Truman in the White House; a portion of the Trumans' extensive personal library (including the mysteries preferred by Bess); the family record collection; the official White House portrait of the First Lady (the one in Washington D.C., is a copy): and paintings including a panorama of Athens, Greece, a "primitive" of Key West featuring palm trees and a backward-looking donkey, and a canvas entitled "Swan River." The fireplace is framed with tiles depicting a fanciful Middle Eastern desert landscape with tents and minarets, likely inspired by One Thousand and One Nights.

Truman is one of the few Presidents who never owned his own home prior to his time in office. He lived with his parents until he married, then in the Wallace House, in rented apartments and houses in Washington (including 4701 Connecticut Avenue), in Blair House (the official state visitors residence), and in the White House, but it was not until July 1953, following his term of office and the December 1952 death of Madge Gates Wallace, that Harry and Bess Truman purchased the home for themselves from Madge Wallace’s estate. (Note: Bess Truman’s three younger brothers each sold Bess their respective shares they had inherited in their late mother’s property since each of them already had private homes of their own and had no further desire to own or move back into 219 North Delaware Street).

The house is now located in the Harry S. Truman Historic District, a National Historic Landmark District.

== Truman Farm Home in Grandview ==
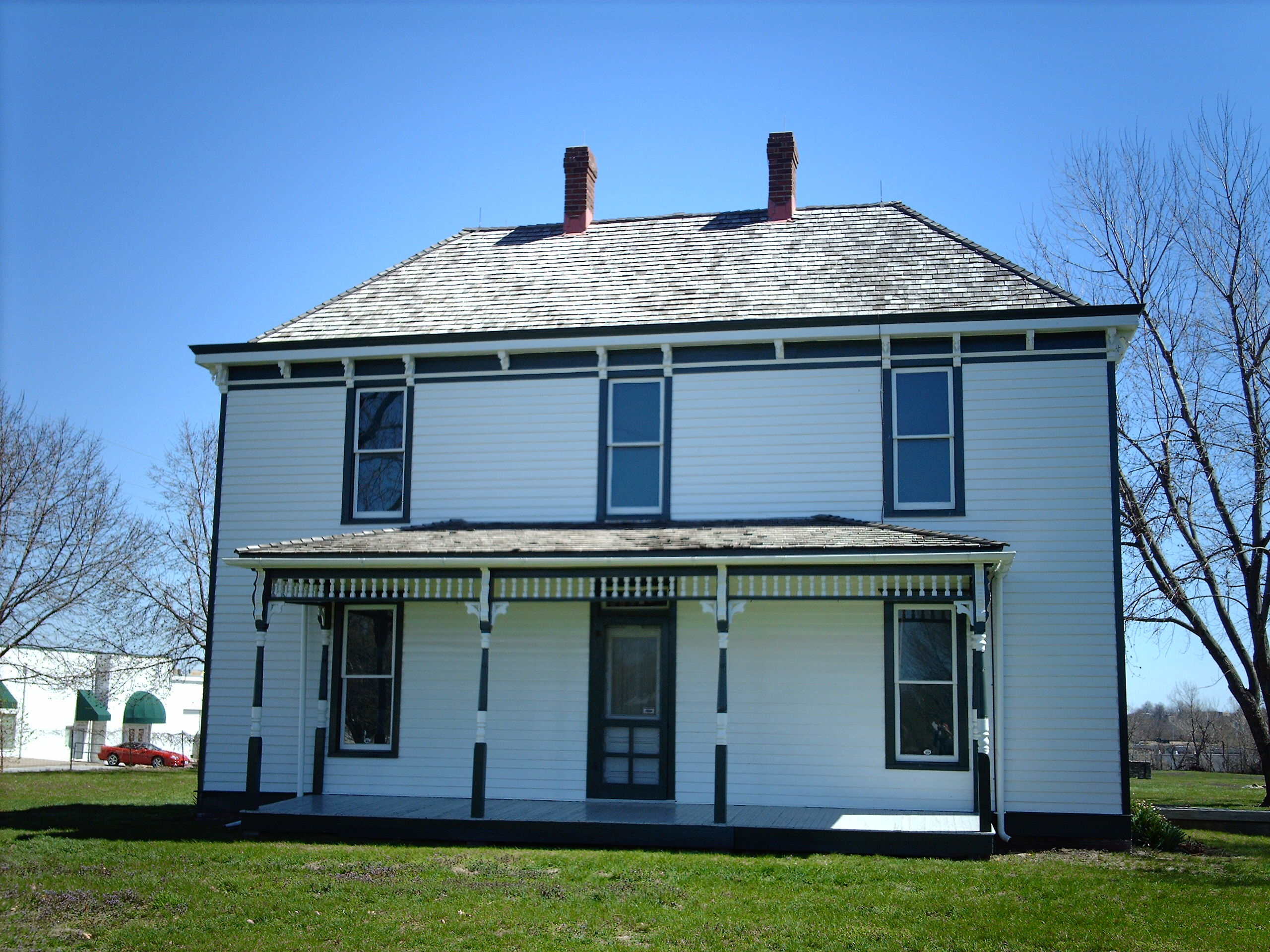
Truman's farm home in Grandview, Missouri

The Harry S. Truman Farm Home is located 15 miles (24 km) away from Independence in Grandview, Missouri. A National Historic Landmark, the farmhouse at 12301 Blue Ridge Blvd. was built in 1894 by Harry Truman's maternal grandmother, and is the centerpiece of a 5.25 acres (2.12 ha) remnant of the family's former 600-acre (240 ha) farm. Truman worked the farm as a young man, from 1906 to 1917. It was here, said his mother, that Harry got his "common sense." There is no visitor center on the site, but the grounds are open year-round for self-guided tours, and an audio tour is available. Guided tours were formerly conducted during the summer, but were cancelled in 2013 due to sequestration-related budget cuts.

The site consists of a two-story farm house; a reconstructed smokehouse; the Grandview post office-turned-garage (Truman moved it to the farm to store his 1911 Stafford automobile); a restored box wagon once used on the farm; and several stone fence posts marking the original boundaries of the farm, plus other original and reconstructed buildings.

After Truman returned to private life he sold portions of the farm for the Truman Corners Shopping Center as well as other Kansas City suburban development.

== See also ==
- List of residences of presidents of the United States
- Presidential memorials in the United States
