= Legends Field =

Kansas City baseball park

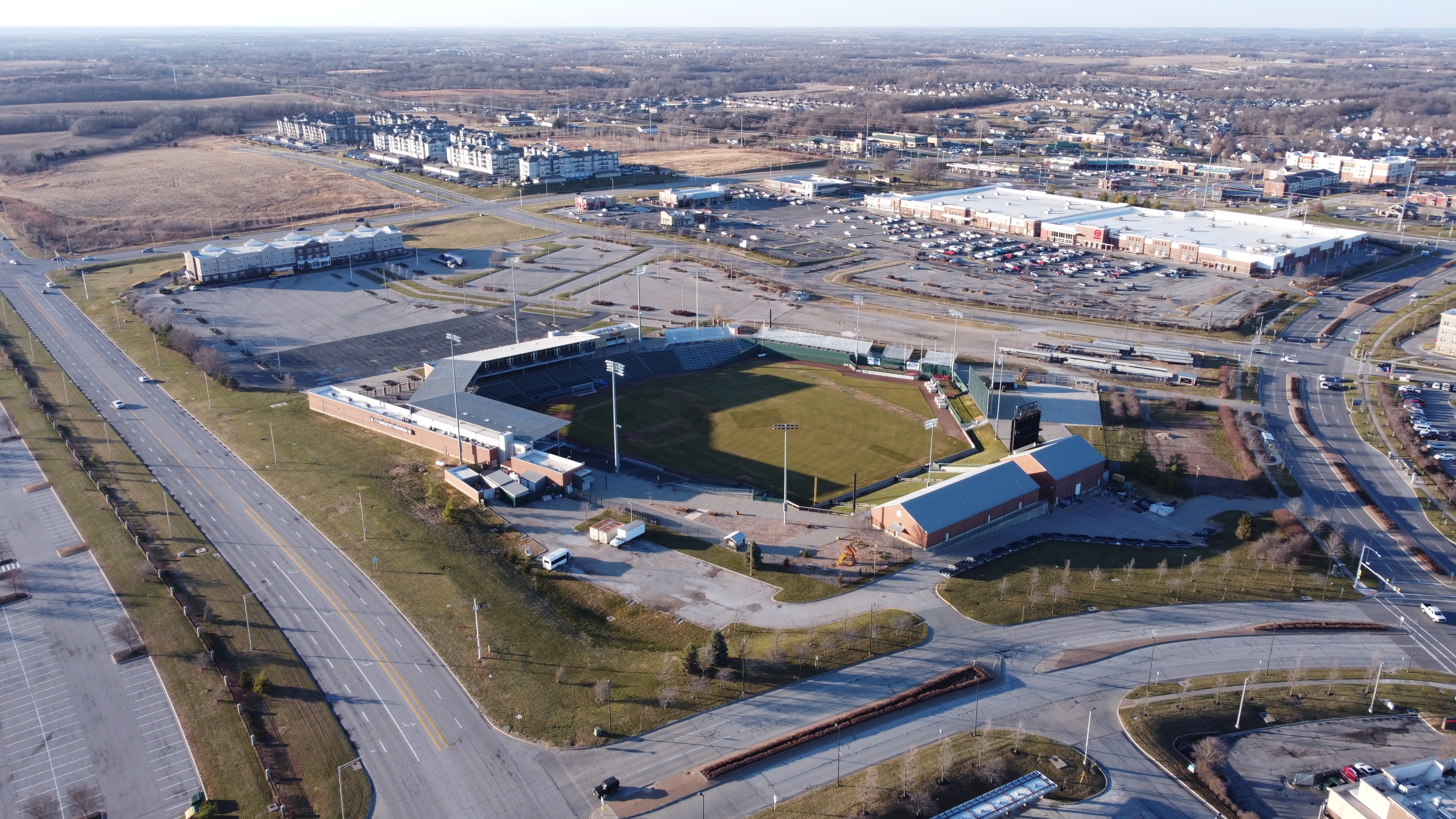
- Legends Field
- Interactive map of Legends Field
- Former names: T-Bones Stadium (2018–2020); CommunityAmerica Ballpark (2002–2017)
- Address: 1800 Village West Pkwy
- Location: Kansas City, Kansas
- Coordinates: 39°7′28″N 94°49′51″W
- Owner: Unified Government of Wyandotte County/Kansas City, Kansas
- Capacity: Baseball: 6,537 (with standing room at least 7,500); Soccer: 10,385
- Surface: Bermuda grass
- Record attendance: 10,385 (March 29, 2008)
- Field size: Left field: 300 feet (91 m); Left-center: 411 feet (125 m); Center field: 396 feet (121 m); Right-center: 409 feet (125 m); Right field: 328 feet (100 m)

Construction
- Groundbreaking: September 4, 2002
- Opened: June 6, 2003
- Cost: $12 million USD ($21 million in 2025 dollars)
- Architect: Heinlein Schrock Stearns (now 360 Architecture)

Tenants
- Kansas City Monarchs (NL/AA) 2003–present Kansas City Wizards (MLS) 2008–2010; Kansas City Current (NWSL) 2021

Legends Field is a baseball park in Kansas City, Kansas, located in the neighborhood of Piper. It is the home of the Kansas City Monarchs of the American Association of Professional Baseball. It was formerly the home of the Kansas City Wizards (now Sporting Kansas City) in Major League Soccer (MLS) and briefly home to the Kansas City Current of the National Women's Soccer League (NWSL) in their inaugural year. It is located in the Village West area at 1800 Village West Parkway. Many local area High School teams, including Bonner Springs High School, in their annual Butch Foster Memorial Baseball Classic play at the ballpark. It has been used for concerts and some community events.

== Description ==
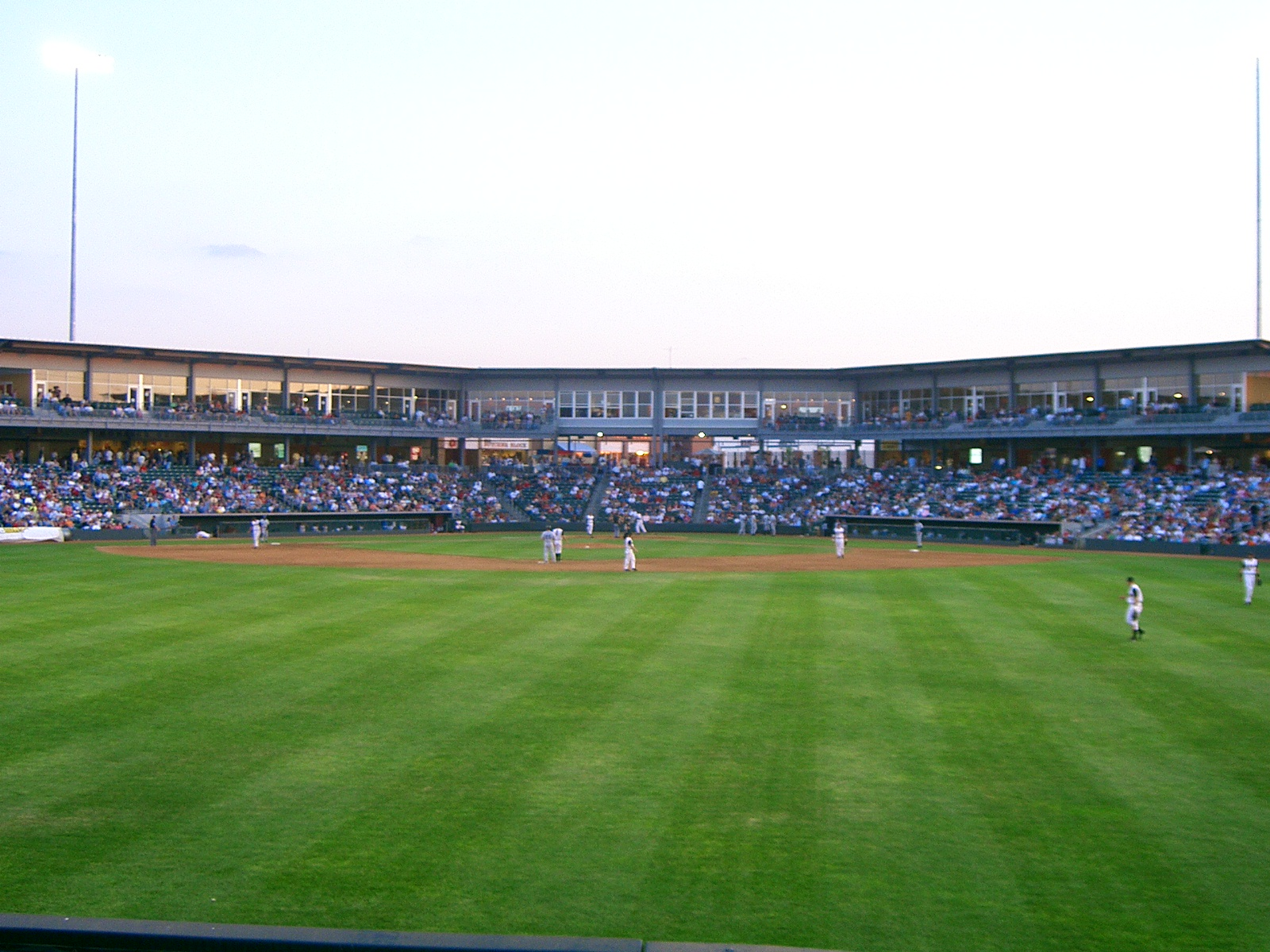
View from center field

The ballpark was originally named after CommunityAmerica Credit Union, a Kansas City area financial institution, which held naming rights to the park from 2002 to 2017. The reported dimensions of CommunityAmerica are 300 feet (91 m) down the left field line (with an 18-foot (5.5 m) wall, affectionately known as "the Little Green Monster"), 411 feet (125 m) to left center, 396 feet (121 m) to dead center, 409 feet (125 m) to right center, and 328 feet (100 m) down the right field line. Walls are about five feet high, with the exception of the Little Green Monster and the bullpen area in left center. The walls are about 10 feet (3.0 m) high at the bullpens, which are in center field and add a few extra angles and contours to the outfield. The playing and seating areas are completely surrounded by a 25-foot (7.6 m) wide concourse. With the addition of bleacher seats in 2008, the park has 6,537 fixed seats, though its capacity (including the concourse, picnic area, right field grass berm, and center field party area) is usually considered over 7,500.

== History ==
Ground was broken on September 4, 2002, and was completed in just over nine months by Titan Construction, opening June 6, 2003. Baseball had a record paid attendance of 10,345 on June 23, 2007. Major League Soccer attendance, with the updated seating configuration, regularly exceeded 8,000, and its record paid attendance was 10,385 on March 29, 2008. The 2006 Northern League All-Star game was held at CommunityAmerica Ballpark on July 18, with related festivities the day before. Sporting Kansas City played its home games at the stadium while the team's new stadium was being constructed. Because of the soccer presence, the Baseball configuration had taken an unusual step. In most natural grass fields the base lines where baserunners run between bases is dirt. However, CommunityAmerica Ballpark had dirt sliding pits just around the three bases, homeplate, and the pitchers mound, much like most typical artificial turf baseball fields. This was so that grounds crews would not need to install excessive amounts of grass for each Wizards home game. On March 29, 2008, the Wizards played their first game at the ballpark and defeated D.C. United 2–0 in front of a sell-out crowd.

Before the start of the 2008 season, the left field berm area was replaced with permanent bleacher seats. Additional metal bleachers were added on the concourse running from behind the former left field berm to the bullpens in center field. This added 2,172 to the ballpark's fixed seating capacity, raising it from its originally 4,365 fixed seats.

On June 3, 2007 the ballpark was the site of a world record-setting performance of the Deep Purple hit "Smoke on the Water" by 1683 guitarists, in a publicity stunt for KYYS radio (now KZPT).

On November 20, 2017, the T-Bones announced that the naming rights agreement between the team and CommunityAmerica would not be renewed, with the facility being named T-Bones Stadium on an interim basis. In July 2019, the T-Bones reached a naming-rights deal with Kansas City-based Pro Athlete, Inc. to use their JustBats brand in renaming the playing surface JustBats Field at T-Bones Stadium.

The Unified Government of Wyandotte County/Kansas City, Kansas evicted the T-Bones from the stadium on October 14, 2019 for failure to keep up rent and utility payments. Days later, the Unified Government approved a stadium lease with an organization trying to purchase the T-Bones. The purchase was completed. The new five-year lease has three five-year options.

The Kansas City Star reported in December 2020 that the Kansas City NWSL team would play home matches in the stadium.

In January 2021, the stadium was renamed "Field of Legends" to reflect the T-Bones rebranding as the Monarchs. It is now called "Legends Field".

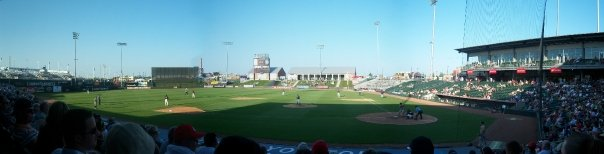
July 2008

== Gallery ==
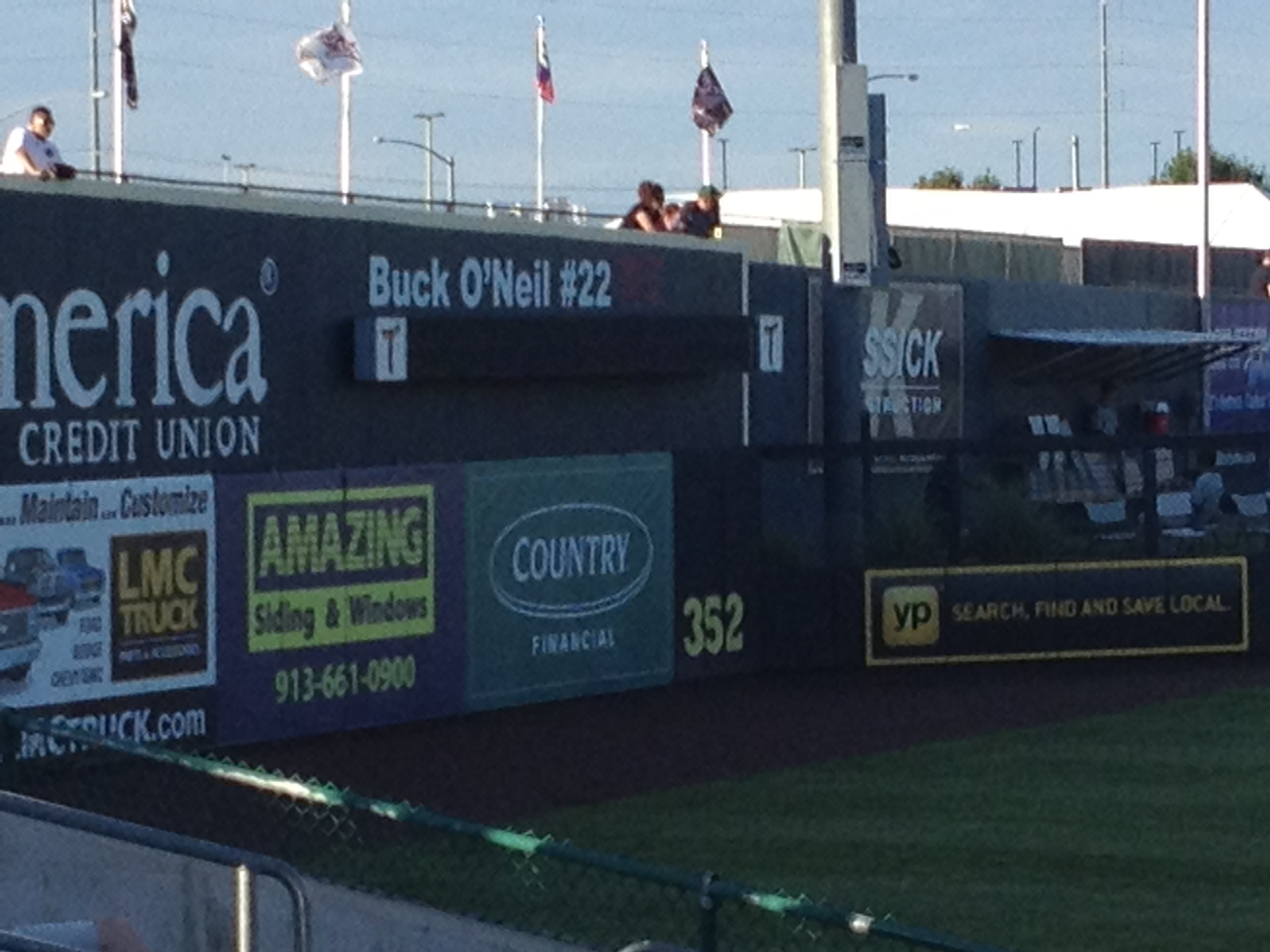
Left field wall displaying the Retired number of Buck O'Neil

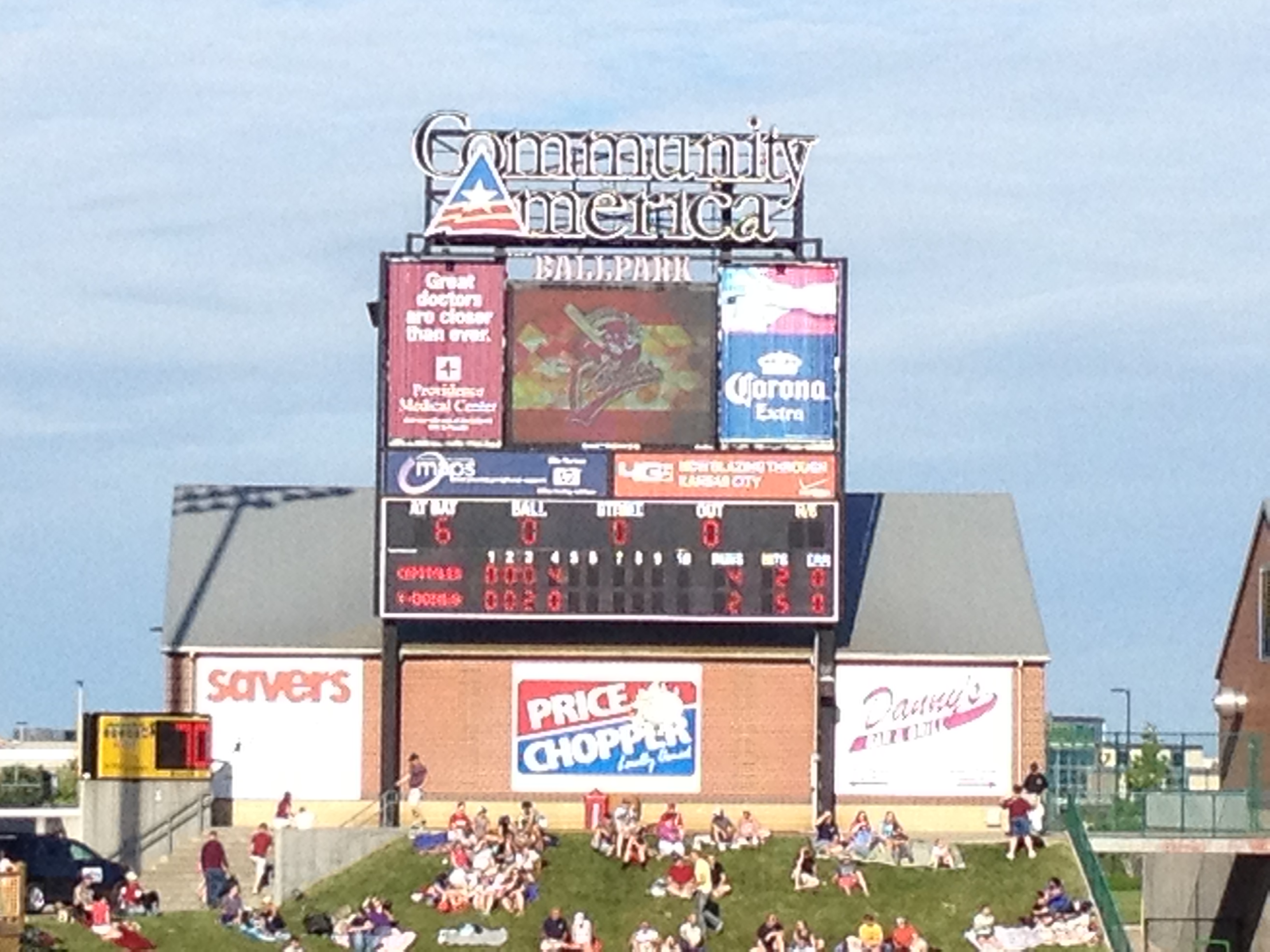
Scoreboard

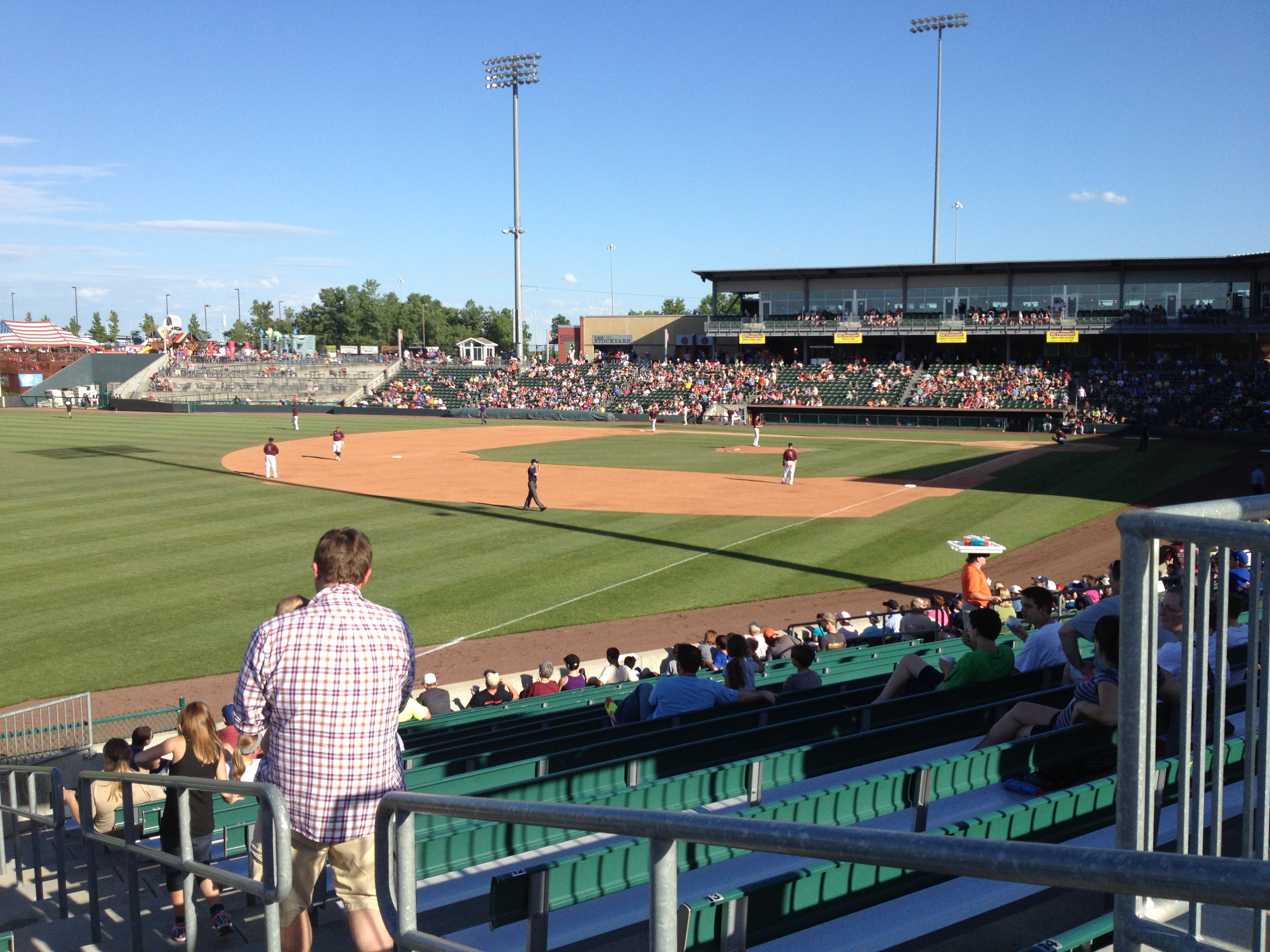
View from left field stands

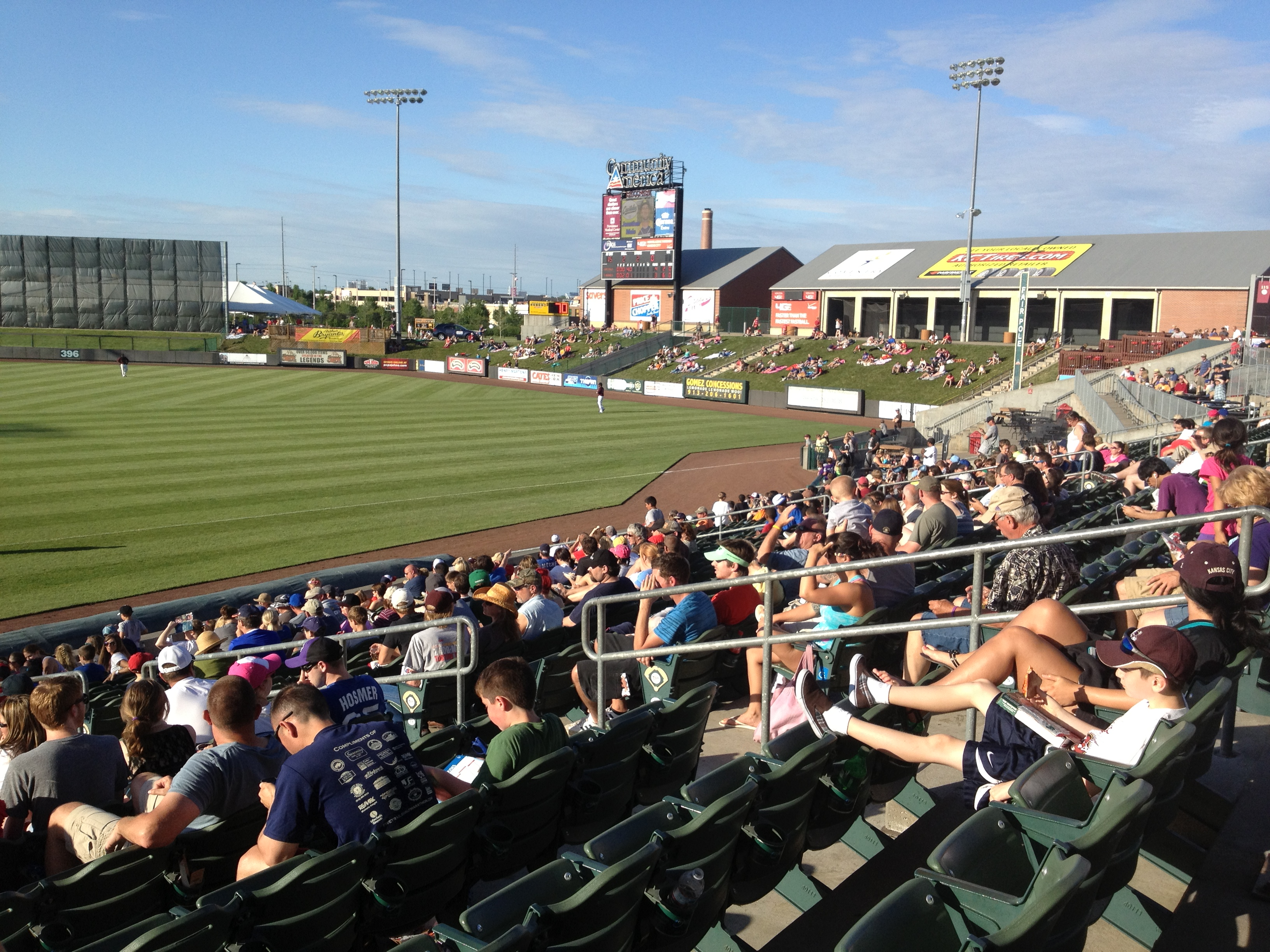
View from right sideline stands

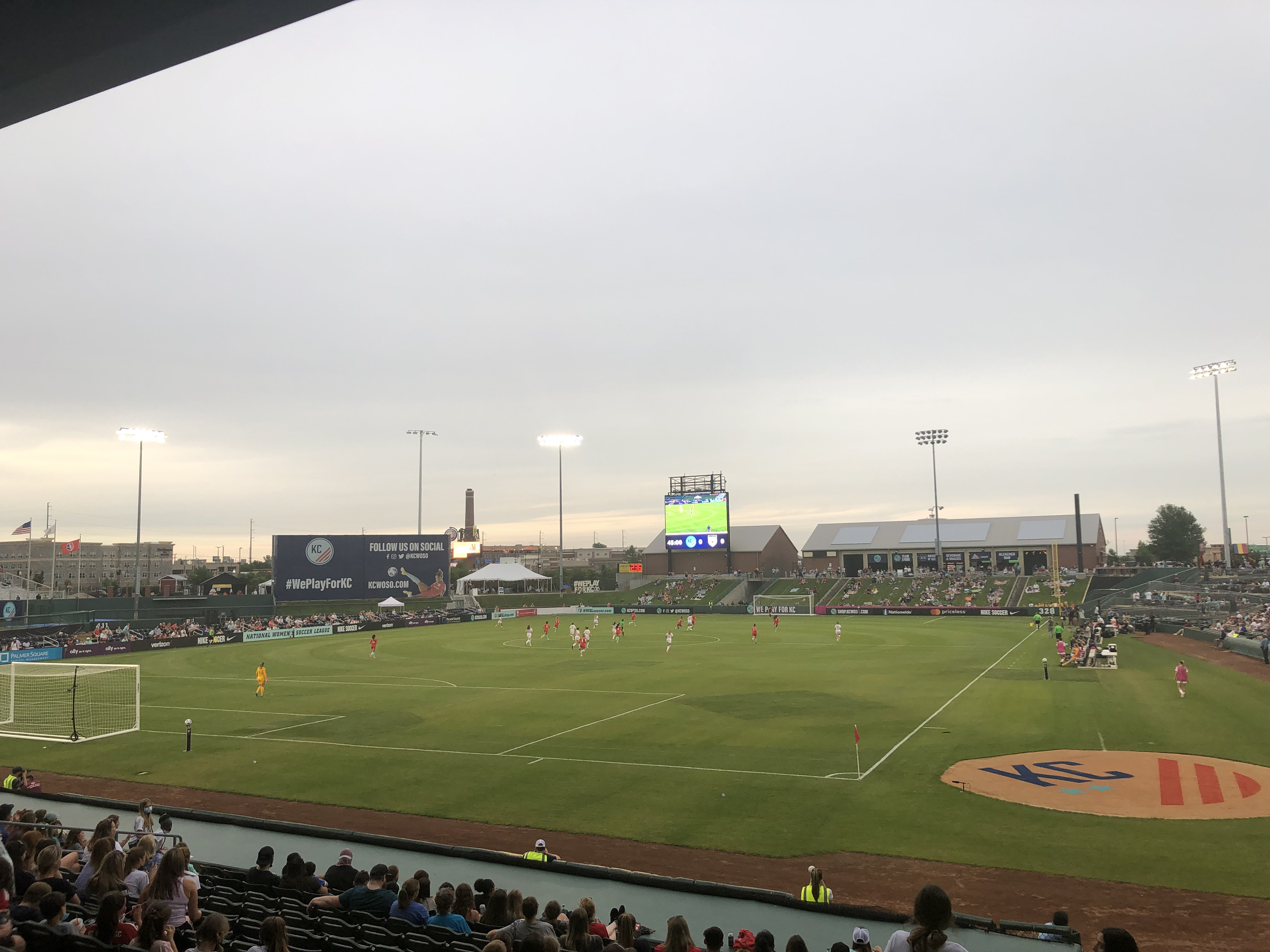
The stadium's soccer configuration in 2021

Events and tenants
Preceded by U.S. Steel Yard	Host of the NoL All-Star Game; CommunityAmerica Ballpark; 2006	Succeeded by Newman Outdoor Field
Preceded by Arrowhead Stadium	Home of Sporting Kansas City; 2008–2010	Succeeded by Children's Mercy Park
Preceded by None	Home of Kansas City NWSL; 2021	Succeeded by Children's Mercy Park
