= Delaware Township, Wyandotte County, Kansas =

Township in Kansas, U.S.

Delaware Township Wyandotte County, Kansas
- Township
- Location within Wyandotte County in Red

- Location within the state of Kansas Delaware Township; Wyandotte County, Kansas (the United States)
- Coordinates: 39°1′17.83″N 94°54′0.35″W
- Country: United States
- State: Kansas
- County: Wyandotte

Area
  - Total: 2.79 sq mi (7.2 km^{2})
  - Land: 2.47 sq mi (6.4 km^{2})
  - Water: 0.32 sq mi (0.83 km^{2})
- Elevation: 784 ft (239 m)

Population (2020)
  - Total: 37
  - Density: 15/sq mi (5.8/km^{2})
- Area code: 913
- GNIS ID: 479169

Delaware Township is the sole township in Wyandotte County, Kansas, United States. As of the 2020 census, it recorded 37 people living in the township.

== History ==
The township gets its name from the Delaware people who were resettled into Kansas in the 1820s. The township's original platting was all that of Township 11 and 12 South in Range 23 East that was north of the Kansas River. This included the original settlements of Bonner Springs and Edwardsville, and the other settlements of Loring and Tiblow.

Historically, there were more townships within Wyandotte County, such as Prairie, Quindaro, Shawnee, and Wyandotte Townships. However, due to urbanization within the county, all of these townships became defunct, and Delaware Township since remains the only township in the county. Previously, Edwardsville was part of the township before the 2010 census reported that the city became independent from the township.

== Geography ==
The township is defined as the area in Wyandotte County considered governmentally independent from the county's four cities: Bonner Springs, Edwardsville, Kansas City, and Lake Quivira, for a total of 2.43 square miles (6.3 km^{2}) of land (and 0.36 square miles (0.93 km^{2}) of water. The north border of the township is Bonner Springs, the west is Sherman Township of Leavenworth County and the southeast is the Kansas River which forms the boundary of Shawnee, Kansas in Johnson County

== Demographics ==
As of the 2020 census, there were 37 residents living in 11 total housing units (within 11 total households). There were 8 residents who identified as Hispanic/Latino of any race.

Historical population
Census	Pop.	Note	%±
1900	1,516		—
1910	1,771		16.8%
1920	1,987		12.2%
1930	3,435		72.9%
1940	2,387		−30.5%
1950	2,955		23.8%
1960	3,846		30.2%
1970	3,550		−7.7%
1980	153		−95.7%
1990	166		8.5%
2000	4,200		2,430.1%
2010	31		−99.3%
2020	37		19.4%
U.S. Decennial Census

Racial Makeup of Delaware Township
Racial Identity	Township Total	County Total
White	27	73,721
American Indian/Alaska Native	1	1,917
Two or more races	9	25,283
Hispanic/Latino (any race)	8	55,814
Total	37	169,245
