= Quivira (disambiguation) =

Quivira may refer to:

- Quivira, a place first visited by Francisco Vásquez de Coronado while in search of the mythical Seven Cities of Gold
- Quivira National Wildlife Refuge, a salt marsh located in south central Kansas
- Baboquivari Peak Wilderness, a wilderness area in southern Arizona
- Lake Quivira, Kansas, a city in Johnson and Wyandotte counties in Kansas. The population was 932 at the 2000 census
- Quivira (Titan), a bright albedo feature on Saturn's moon Titan
- Quivira Wine, a winery in the Dry Creek Valley AVA of Sonoma County, California
- Quivira (typeface), an open-source Unicode typeface
