= 1980 United States presidential election in Kansas =

- November 4, 1980

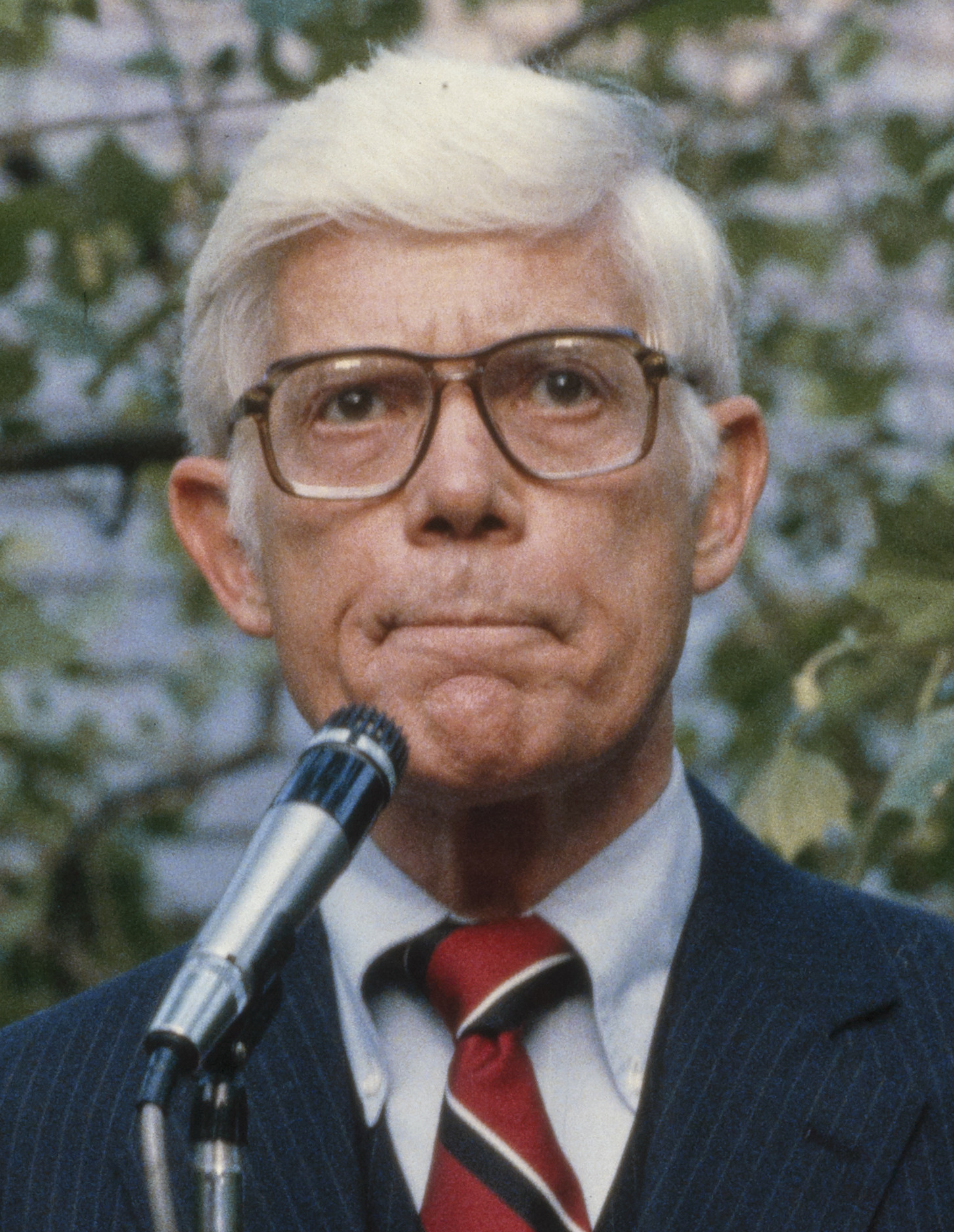
Nominee	Ronald Reagan	Jimmy Carter	John B. Anderson
Party	Republican	Democratic	Independent
Home state	California	Georgia	Illinois
Running mate	George H. W. Bush	Walter Mondale	Patrick Lucey
Electoral vote	7	0	0
Popular vote	566,812	326,150	68,231
Percentage	57.85%	33.29%	6.96%
County results
Reagan
40–50%
50–60%
60–70%
70–80%
Carter
50–60%
President before election
Jimmy Carter
Democratic
Elected President
Ronald Reagan
Republican

The 1980 United States presidential election in Kansas took place on November 4, 1980. All 50 states and the District of Columbia were part of the 1980 United States presidential election. State voters chose seven electors to the Electoral College, who voted for president and vice president.

Kansas had gone Republican in the previous ten presidential elections except for Lyndon B. Johnson's 1964 landslide, although Carter's 7.5-point defeat in 1976 was the second-best performance for a Democrat in that period. Carter and Ronald Reagan both won landslides in the state’s early April presidential primaries, in Reagan’s case this being aided strongly by the support of Sunflower State Senator Bob Dole. By July it was clear that the economic frustration of Kansas’ farmers, who had due to a major drought given unusual support to Carter in 1976, would turn them and the state further towards Reagan than it had been in 1976. Although Reagan and Carter campaigned heavily in neighboring Jackson County, Missouri during October – spending time in both Independence and the Missouri section of Kansas City where they sparred over the Iran hostage crisis – neither candidate campaigned over the Kansas state line.

Kansas was won by former California Governor Ronald Reagan (R) by a margin of 24.56 points. As had previously occurred in 1952, 1956 and 1968, the Republican nominee won every county except urbanised and substantially black and Hispanic Wyandotte, home to Kansas City, Kansas. Kansas has remained a reliably Republican state, and the last Democratic presidential candidate to carry the state was Lyndon Johnson in 1964.

== Results ==
Electoral results
Presidential candidate	Party	Home state	Popular vote		Electoral vote	Running mate		
Presidential candidate	Party	Home state	Count	Percentage	Electoral vote	Vice-presidential candidate	Home state	Electoral vote
Ronald Reagan	Republican	California	566,812	57.85%	7	George H. W. Bush	Texas	7
Jimmy Carter (incumbent)	Democrat	Georgia	326,150	33.29%	0	Walter Mondale (incumbent)	Minnesota	0
John B. Anderson	Independent	Illinois	68,231	6.96%	0	Patrick Lucey	Wisconsin	0
Ed Clark	Independent	California	14,470	1.48%	0	David Koch	New York	0
Frank Shelton	American	Kansas	1,555	0.16%	0	George E. Jackson	Maine	0
Gus Hall	Independent	New York	967	0.10%	0	Angela Davis	California	0
Benjamin Bubar	Statesman	Maine	821	0.08%	0	Earl Dodge	Colorado	0
John Rarick	Conservative	Louisiana	789	0.08%	0	Eileen Shearer	California	0
Total			979,795	100%	7			7
Needed to win					270			270

=== Results by county ===
County	Ronald Reagan Republican		Jimmy Carter Democratic		John B. Anderson Independent		Ed Clark Independent		Various candidates Other parties		Margin		Total votes cast
County	#	%	#	%	#	%	#	%	#	%	#	%	Total votes cast
Allen	3,811	60.33%	2,009	31.80%	380	6.02%	96	1.52%	21	0.33%	1,802	28.53%	6,317
Anderson	2,363	62.63%	1,170	31.01%	184	4.88%	49	1.30%	7	0.19%	1,193	31.62%	3,773
Atchison	4,084	53.87%	3,063	40.40%	345	4.55%	80	1.06%	9	0.12%	1,021	13.47%	7,581
Barber	1,872	62.53%	914	30.53%	168	5.61%	35	1.17%	5	0.17%	958	32.00%	2,994
Barton	9,147	66.03%	3,663	26.44%	793	5.72%	213	1.54%	36	0.26%	5,484	39.59%	13,852
Bourbon	4,263	59.22%	2,605	36.19%	251	3.49%	66	0.92%	14	0.19%	1,658	23.03%	7,199
Brown	3,598	67.61%	1,370	25.74%	286	5.37%	57	1.07%	11	0.21%	2,228	41.87%	5,322
Butler	10,210	55.33%	6,875	37.26%	1,015	5.50%	328	1.78%	25	0.14%	3,335	18.07%	18,453
Chase	1,073	66.94%	413	25.76%	92	5.74%	21	1.31%	4	0.25%	660	41.18%	1,603
Chautauqua	1,566	71.60%	543	24.83%	57	2.61%	15	0.69%	6	0.27%	1,023	46.77%	2,187
Cherokee	5,296	54.81%	3,969	41.08%	282	2.92%	87	0.90%	28	0.29%	1,327	13.73%	9,662
Cheyenne	1,330	73.89%	358	19.89%	81	4.50%	25	1.39%	6	0.33%	972	54.00%	1,800
Clark	901	63.59%	430	30.35%	67	4.73%	17	1.20%	2	0.14%	471	33.24%	1,417
Clay	3,449	73.90%	932	19.97%	217	4.65%	44	0.94%	25	0.54%	2,517	53.93%	4,667
Cloud	3,581	61.56%	1,793	30.82%	344	5.91%	69	1.19%	30	0.52%	1,788	30.74%	5,817
Coffey	2,491	69.16%	938	26.04%	128	3.55%	38	1.05%	7	0.19%	1,553	43.12%	3,602
Comanche	877	65.45%	393	29.33%	50	3.73%	14	1.04%	6	0.45%	484	36.12%	1,340
Cowley	8,749	57.14%	5,474	35.75%	866	5.66%	196	1.28%	27	0.18%	3,275	21.39%	15,312
Crawford	8,058	47.81%	7,658	45.43%	847	5.03%	227	1.35%	65	0.39%	400	2.38%	16,855
Decatur	1,642	72.98%	443	19.69%	125	5.56%	28	1.24%	12	0.53%	1,199	53.29%	2,250
Dickinson	5,654	67.64%	2,108	25.22%	469	5.61%	87	1.04%	41	0.49%	3,546	42.42%	8,359
Doniphan	2,523	67.84%	1,001	26.92%	146	3.93%	41	1.10%	8	0.22%	1,522	40.92%	3,719
Douglas	14,106	49.01%	9,360	32.52%	4,770	16.57%	471	1.64%	77	0.27%	4,746	16.49%	28,784
Edwards	1,409	63.93%	616	27.95%	127	5.76%	46	2.09%	6	0.27%	793	35.98%	2,204
Elk	1,280	69.68%	482	26.24%	54	2.94%	17	0.93%	4	0.22%	798	43.44%	1,837
Ellis	5,634	52.54%	3,940	36.74%	923	8.61%	211	1.97%	16	0.15%	1,694	15.80%	10,724
Ellsworth	2,155	65.90%	886	27.09%	167	5.11%	57	1.74%	5	0.15%	1,269	38.81%	3,270
Finney	4,831	58.59%	2,689	32.61%	531	6.44%	179	2.17%	16	0.19%	2,142	25.98%	8,246
Ford	5,686	58.86%	3,194	33.06%	622	6.44%	141	1.46%	18	0.19%	2,492	25.80%	9,661
Franklin	5,525	62.73%	2,726	30.95%	432	4.90%	117	1.33%	8	0.09%	2,799	31.78%	8,808
Geary	3,534	56.06%	2,357	37.39%	332	5.27%	68	1.08%	13	0.21%	1,177	18.67%	6,304
Gove	1,263	71.11%	396	22.30%	91	5.12%	22	1.24%	4	0.23%	867	48.81%	1,776
Graham	1,450	70.90%	473	23.13%	98	4.79%	17	0.83%	7	0.34%	977	47.77%	2,045
Grant	1,711	66.01%	683	26.35%	150	5.79%	44	1.70%	4	0.15%	1,028	39.66%	2,592
Gray	1,310	63.68%	583	28.34%	123	5.98%	37	1.80%	4	0.19%	727	35.34%	2,057
Greeley	600	63.36%	235	24.82%	85	8.98%	23	2.43%	4	0.42%	365	38.54%	947
Greenwood	2,685	64.62%	1,241	29.87%	170	4.09%	40	0.96%	19	0.46%	1,444	34.75%	4,155
Hamilton	889	64.65%	402	29.24%	66	4.80%	16	1.16%	2	0.15%	487	35.41%	1,375
Harper	2,254	64.18%	990	28.19%	182	5.18%	81	2.31%	5	0.14%	1,264	35.99%	3,512
Harvey	7,045	54.56%	4,173	32.32%	1,356	10.50%	302	2.34%	36	0.28%	2,872	22.24%	12,912
Haskell	1,014	67.65%	374	24.95%	84	5.60%	23	1.53%	4	0.27%	640	42.70%	1,499
Hodgeman	831	66.16%	339	26.99%	69	5.49%	14	1.11%	3	0.24%	492	39.17%	1,256
Jackson	3,211	63.33%	1,537	30.32%	234	4.62%	65	1.28%	23	0.45%	1,674	33.01%	5,070
Jefferson	4,046	64.60%	1,776	28.36%	364	5.81%	66	1.05%	11	0.18%	2,270	36.24%	6,263
Jewell	2,074	72.80%	578	20.29%	153	5.37%	39	1.37%	5	0.18%	1,496	52.51%	2,849
Johnson	78,048	62.95%	33,210	26.79%	10,947	8.83%	1,318	1.06%	460	0.37%	44,838	36.16%	123,983
Kearny	924	66.38%	375	26.94%	62	4.45%	24	1.72%	7	0.50%	549	39.44%	1,392
Kingman	2,610	63.63%	1,133	27.62%	286	6.97%	71	1.73%	2	0.05%	1,477	36.01%	4,102
Kiowa	1,433	72.16%	438	22.05%	88	4.43%	25	1.26%	2	0.10%	995	50.11%	1,986
Labette	5,244	52.86%	3,947	39.78%	588	5.93%	116	1.17%	26	0.26%	1,297	13.08%	9,921
Lane	924	67.54%	321	23.46%	100	7.31%	21	1.54%	2	0.15%	603	44.08%	1,368
Leavenworth	9,157	54.98%	6,354	38.15%	955	5.73%	140	0.84%	50	0.30%	2,803	16.83%	16,656
Lincoln	1,685	72.16%	528	22.61%	96	4.11%	22	0.94%	4	0.17%	1,157	49.55%	2,335
Linn	2,407	64.88%	1,157	31.19%	103	2.78%	32	0.86%	11	0.30%	1,250	33.69%	3,710
Logan	1,261	72.89%	358	20.69%	66	3.82%	36	2.08%	9	0.52%	903	52.20%	1,730
Lyon	8,431	57.94%	4,680	32.16%	1,216	8.36%	198	1.36%	26	0.18%	3,751	25.78%	14,551
McPherson	6,843	58.83%	3,340	28.72%	1,222	10.51%	171	1.47%	55	0.47%	3,503	30.11%	11,631
Marion	3,960	64.39%	1,569	25.51%	488	7.93%	114	1.85%	19	0.31%	2,391	38.88%	6,150
Marshall	4,127	67.69%	1,555	25.50%	330	5.41%	64	1.05%	21	0.34%	2,572	42.19%	6,097
Meade	1,618	71.66%	482	21.35%	121	5.36%	34	1.51%	3	0.13%	1,136	50.31%	2,258
Miami	4,740	57.10%	3,071	37.00%	368	4.43%	104	1.25%	18	0.22%	1,669	20.10%	8,301
Mitchell	2,821	71.36%	876	22.16%	197	4.98%	35	0.89%	24	0.61%	1,945	49.20%	3,953
Montgomery	10,856	64.18%	5,282	31.23%	488	2.89%	154	0.91%	135	0.80%	5,574	32.95%	16,915
Morris	1,933	65.55%	810	27.47%	166	5.63%	33	1.12%	7	0.24%	1,123	38.08%	2,949
Morton	1,157	69.61%	414	24.91%	71	4.27%	16	0.96%	4	0.24%	743	44.70%	1,662
Nemaha	3,546	64.99%	1,600	29.33%	243	4.45%	56	1.03%	11	0.20%	1,946	35.66%	5,456
Neosho	4,613	57.11%	2,923	36.19%	432	5.35%	89	1.10%	20	0.25%	1,690	20.92%	8,077
Ness	1,657	67.49%	616	25.09%	136	5.54%	40	1.63%	6	0.24%	1,041	42.40%	2,455
Norton	2,625	75.50%	666	19.15%	151	4.34%	26	0.75%	9	0.26%	1,959	56.35%	3,477
Osage	3,817	60.36%	2,088	33.02%	330	5.22%	74	1.17%	15	0.24%	1,729	27.34%	6,324
Osborne	2,188	73.32%	620	20.78%	125	4.19%	36	1.21%	15	0.50%	1,568	52.54%	2,984
Ottawa	2,118	71.87%	630	21.38%	150	5.09%	41	1.39%	8	0.27%	1,488	50.49%	2,947
Pawnee	2,170	58.79%	1,184	32.08%	281	7.61%	52	1.41%	4	0.11%	986	26.71%	3,691
Phillips	2,731	74.48%	748	20.40%	143	3.90%	35	0.95%	10	0.27%	1,983	54.08%	3,667
Pottawatomie	3,895	63.40%	1,724	28.06%	444	7.23%	60	0.98%	21	0.34%	2,171	35.34%	6,144
Pratt	2,866	61.20%	1,369	29.23%	329	7.03%	95	2.03%	24	0.51%	1,497	31.97%	4,683
Rawlins	1,524	73.41%	427	20.57%	87	4.19%	32	1.54%	6	0.29%	1,097	52.84%	2,076
Reno	13,804	52.85%	9,615	36.81%	2,225	8.52%	418	1.60%	59	0.23%	4,189	16.04%	26,121
Republic	3,031	73.57%	850	20.63%	183	4.44%	45	1.09%	11	0.27%	2,181	52.94%	4,120
Rice	3,211	57.67%	1,847	33.17%	426	7.65%	75	1.35%	9	0.16%	1,364	24.50%	5,568
Riley	8,904	52.94%	5,224	31.06%	2,443	14.53%	201	1.20%	46	0.27%	3,680	21.88%	16,818
Rooks	2,275	71.38%	725	22.75%	144	4.52%	37	1.16%	6	0.19%	1,550	48.63%	3,187
Rush	1,840	71.54%	557	21.66%	144	5.60%	24	0.93%	7	0.27%	1,283	49.88%	2,572
Russell	3,241	73.04%	910	20.51%	229	5.16%	51	1.15%	6	0.14%	2,331	52.53%	4,437
Saline	12,758	60.27%	6,382	30.15%	1,706	8.06%	287	1.36%	36	0.17%	6,376	30.12%	21,169
Scott	1,829	75.64%	456	18.86%	99	4.09%	30	1.24%	4	0.17%	1,373	56.78%	2,418
Sedgwick	75,317	51.79%	55,105	37.89%	10,222	7.03%	3,661	2.52%	1,126	0.77%	20,212	13.90%	145,431
Seward	4,385	70.83%	1,460	23.58%	250	4.04%	85	1.37%	11	0.18%	2,925	47.25%	6,191
Shawnee	36,290	53.54%	24,852	36.67%	5,524	8.15%	805	1.19%	305	0.45%	11,438	16.87%	67,776
Sheridan	1,202	71.00%	391	23.10%	68	4.02%	24	1.42%	8	0.47%	811	47.90%	1,693
Sherman	2,315	68.86%	779	23.17%	215	6.40%	43	1.28%	10	0.30%	1,536	45.69%	3,362
Smith	2,415	71.70%	719	21.35%	183	5.43%	48	1.43%	3	0.09%	1,696	50.35%	3,368
Stafford	1,865	62.67%	872	29.30%	184	6.18%	45	1.51%	10	0.34%	993	33.37%	2,976
Stanton	672	67.74%	231	23.29%	62	6.25%	22	2.22%	5	0.50%	441	44.45%	992
Stevens	1,502	72.04%	478	22.93%	67	3.21%	33	1.58%	5	0.24%	1,024	49.11%	2,085
Sumner	6,038	57.53%	3,761	35.83%	486	4.63%	190	1.81%	21	0.20%	2,277	21.70%	10,496
Thomas	2,789	66.37%	1,045	24.87%	269	6.40%	91	2.17%	8	0.19%	1,744	41.50%	4,202
Trego	1,340	65.43%	523	25.54%	138	6.74%	42	2.05%	5	0.24%	817	39.89%	2,048
Wabaunsee	2,255	67.98%	853	25.72%	173	5.22%	24	0.72%	12	0.36%	1,402	42.26%	3,317
Wallace	811	78.28%	167	16.12%	36	3.47%	17	1.64%	5	0.48%	644	62.16%	1,036
Washington	3,058	74.90%	784	19.20%	195	4.78%	33	0.81%	13	0.32%	2,274	55.70%	4,083
Wichita	880	69.95%	303	24.09%	60	4.77%	10	0.79%	5	0.40%	577	45.86%	1,258
Wilson	3,328	69.32%	1,205	25.10%	208	4.33%	45	0.94%	15	0.31%	2,123	44.22%	4,801
Woodson	1,435	65.56%	646	29.51%	89	4.07%	16	0.73%	3	0.14%	789	36.05%	2,189
Wyandotte	23,012	38.21%	32,763	54.40%	3,018	5.01%	775	1.29%	655	1.09%	-9,751	-16.19%	60,223
Totals	566,812	57.85%	326,150	33.29%	68,231	6.96%	14,470	1.48%	4,132	0.42%	240,662	24.56%	979,795

==== Counties that flipped from Democratic to Republican ====
- Anderson
- Atchison
- Butler
- Cherokee
- Cloud
- Crawford
- Edwards
- Ellis
- Finney
- Ford
- Gray
- Greeley
- Hamilton
- Hodgeman
- Kingman
- Labette
- Miami
- Ness
- Pawnee
- Reno
- Rice
- Rush
- Stafford
- Sumner
- Wichita

== See also ==
- United States presidential elections in Kansas
- Presidency of Ronald Reagan
