= State Avenue (Kansas City, Kansas) =

Street in Kansas, USA

Coordinates: 39.0512°N 94.7245°W

- Interactive map of State Avenue
- Location: Wyandotte and Johnson counties, Kansas, United States
- West end: US-73 in Kansas City
- Major junctions: K-7 in Kansas City; US-24 / US-40 in Bonner Springs
- East end: North 4th Street in Kansas City

State Avenue is a stretch of roadway in Wyandotte County, Kansas. Its western terminus is at both US 73 and K-7 in Bonner Springs, Kansas and its eastern terminus at North 4th Street in downtown Kansas City, Kansas. Its western terminus continues at both US 24 and US 40, turning south through Tonganoxie. Parallel Parkway runs parallel approximately eighth tenths of a mile to the north nearly the length of the road.

== Cities traveled ==
State Avenue passes through the following cities:

- Kansas City, Kansas
- Bonner Springs, Kansas
- Basehor, Kansas
- Tonganoxie, Kansas

== Major Junction ==
State Avenue largely consists of at-grade intersections. However, there are several roads only accessible by exit from State Avenue.

Exits are not numbered.

- US-24 / US-40 / US-73 / K-7 in Kansas City, KS (State Avenue under K-7/US-73 bridge/partial-cloverleaf ramps)
- I-435 in Kansas City, KS (State Avenue under I-435 bridge/partial-cloverleaf ramps)
- I-635 in Kansas City, KS (State Avenue under I-635 bridge/partial-cloverleaf ramps)
