= Cross-Lines Community Outreach =

Nonprofit helping poor people meet today's needs while helping build self-sufficiency

- Established: 1963 (63 years ago)
- Legal status: 501(c)(3) organization
- Headquarters: Kansas City
- Country: United States
- Coordinates: 39°05′10″N 94°37′41″W
- Revenue: 2,660,889 United States dollar (2022)
- Total Assets: 3,645,021 United States dollar (2020)
- Website: www.cross-lines.org

Cross-Lines Community Outreach, Inc. is a 501(c)(3) providing "people in the Kansas City area affected by poverty with services and opportunities that encourage self-confidence, meet the needs of today, and provide tools for future self-sufficiency."

== History ==
They were founded in 1963 by a group of ministers and concerned citizens. They are listed with the United Way of Greater Kansas City and other organizations trying to connect people in need with available resources and volunteers with opportunities. They have three main programs: basic needs, housing stabilization, and hunger relief. Housing stabilization includes rent and utility assistance.

In March 2020, early in the pandemic, they reported serving over 700 people some days, a huge jump from 300 families per month. In April 2023 they reported seeing over 100 people each day obtaining food for roughly 10 meals from their pantry, where people "pay" in "points" issued in proportion to their household size. That's up from 30 to 40 people each day. When people "pay" in "points" for groceries they select, there may be less waste than when food recipients are given bags containing random assortments of food. They also serve breakfast and lunch Monday through Friday for those in need.

In the winter of 2022-2023 Cross-Lines helped the Unified Government of Wyandotte County and Kansas City, Kansas manage and operate a temporary Severe Cold Weather Overnight Shelter.
