= Bonner Springs High School =

Location
- 100 North McDanield Street; Bonner Springs, Kansas 66012; United States; 39.059102°N 94.895801°W

Information
- School type: Public, High School
- School district: Bonner Springs–Edwardsville USD 204
- CEEB code: 170360
- Principal: Don Hilliard
- Teaching staff: 62.60 (on an FTE basis)
- Grades: 9–12
- Gender: Coed
- Enrollment: 802 (2023-2024)
- Student to teacher ratio: 12.81
- Campus type: Suburban
- Colors: Orange; Black
- Athletics: Class 5A; District 1
- Athletics conference: Frontier League
- Nickname: Braves
- Rival: Piper High School; Tonganoxie High School
- Newspaper: The Pow Wow
- Yearbook: The Totem Pole
- Communities served: Bonner Springs, Edwardsville
- Website: bshs.usd204.net

Bonner Springs High School is the public secondary school in Bonner Springs, Kansas, United States. It is the only high school operated by Bonner Springs–Edwardsville USD 204 school district.

== Athletics ==
Bonner Springs High School, a KSHSAA 5A school, offers a variety of athletics. The Braves' athletic programs compete in the Frontier League.

== Notable alumni ==
- David Jaynes, National Football League (NFL) football player
- Ed Nealy, National Basketball Association (NBA) basketball player

== See also ==
- List of high schools in Kansas
- List of unified school districts in Kansas
