= CommunityAmerica Credit Union =

Credit union in the Kansas City area

CommunityAmerica Federal Credit Union
- Industry: Financial services
- Founded: TWA Club Credit Union (1940)
- Headquarters: Lenexa, Kansas, U.S.
- Number of locations: 57 branches
- Area served: Kansas City area and St. Louis County, Missouri
- Key people: Lisa Ginter (CEO)
- Services: Personal and business finance
- Total assets: $4.6 billion
- Members: 250,000 nationwide
- Number of employees: 800 (as of August 2020)
- Website: communityamerica.com

CommunityAmerica Federal Credit Union, doing business as CommunityAmerica Credit Union (CACU) and UNIFY Financial Credit Union (UFCU) is a credit union headquartered in Lenexa, Kansas, regulated under the authority of the Missouri Division of Credit Unions and the National Credit Union Administration (NCUA) of the U.S. federal government. CommunityAmerica has $4.3 billion in assets, ranking it among the nation's largest credit unions. Based on deposits, CommunityAmerica ranks as one of the top 10 Kansas City-based financial institutions. There are 57 CommunityAmerica branches in the Kansas City, St. Louis, and NW Arkansas areas.

CommunityAmerica serves Missouri residents who live or work in these counties: Jackson, Clay, Platte, Cass, and St. Louis. It serves Kansas residents who live or work in these counties: Johnson, Wyandotte, Douglas, Jefferson, Leavenworth, Miami, and Shawnee.

== History ==
CommunityAmerica was founded on March 19, 1940, as TWA Club Credit Union by TWA pilot George Duvall, with working capitol of only US$1,069 (equivalent to $24,567 in 2025). The first loans were made to employees for $5 until payday with five cents charged for interest. Through the years, the credit union continued to grow by changing its name to Members America Credit Union in 1992 and merging with CommunityAmerica Credit Union in 1998. Since then, the credit union has continued to grow through strategic branch expansion and mergers with other credit unions: Farmland Credit Union in 2003, Midwest United Credit Union in 2007, Healthcare Community Credit Union in 2015, Saint Luke's Credit Union in 2016, Credit Union of Leavenworth County in 2019, Burns & McDonnell Credit Union in 2021, and UNIFY Financial Credit Union in 2025.

The CommunityAmerica Foundation was created to make a difference with a variety of local nonprofit organizations in Kansas City. Grants and sponsorships funded by the Foundation and Credit Union focus in four key target areas: financial literacy & stability, education & reading literacy, health & wellness, and strengthening communities. Over the years, CommunityAmerica has supported Junior Achievement of Greater KC, Boys & Girls Clubs of Greater KC, Operation Breakthrough, Veterans Community Project, City Year Kansas City, Literacy KC and Children’s Mercy Hospital.

CommunityAmerica offers each of its full-time employees 16 hours of paid time each year to volunteer for the 501(c)(3) non-profit organizations of their choice.

CommunityAmerica held the naming rights to CommunityAmerica Ballpark, home of the Kansas City T-Bones, from 2002 to 2017.

As of May 2017, CommunityAmerica is the Official Banking Partner of the Kansas City Chiefs.

In March 2021, CommunityAmerica agreed to a partnership with the Kansas City Royals to become the exclusive naming rights sponsor of the Crown Club behind home plate.
