= Junius George Groves =

American farmer and entrepreneur (1859–1967)

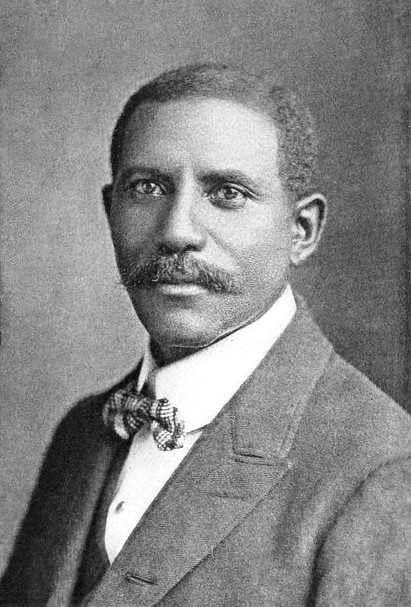
- Born: Junius Grove; April 12, 1859; Green County, Kentucky, US
- Died: August 17, 1925 (aged 66); Edwardsville, Kansas, US
- Occupations: Farmer, businessman
- Known for: "Potato King of the World"
- Spouse: Matilda Stewart (m. 1880)
- Children: 15

Junius George Groves (April 12, 1859 – August 17, 1925) was an American farmer and entrepreneur remembered as one of the wealthiest black Americans of the nineteenth and early twentieth centuries. Known as the "Potato King of the World" by 1902, Groves optimized potato growth methods, out-producing anyone else in the world to that point. His vast financial success—‌analyzed further in Booker T. Washington's The Negro in Business (1907)—‌was utilized to help combat racism by providing economic opportunities for other black Americans.

== Life and career ==
Junius George Grove, was born in slavery on April 12, 1859, in Green County, Kentucky. Groves was born to Martin and Mary (née Anderson) Grove. Mary was enslaved by Alfred Anderson of Green County, Anderson was a former U.S. Congressman and one of Kentucky's largest slaveholders. Martin was enslaved by William Grove, who owned a nearby plantation. According to the Partus sequitur ventrem law, the children of Martin and Mary were property of Anderson. On April 22, 1865, weeks after the end of the American Civil War, Martin Grove, then 44, enlisted in the United States Army. Martin joined Company G of the 125th Colored Infantry. Unfortunately, Grove was killed just a week later along with several other members of his infantry by pie poisoning.

After the war, the family gained freedom. Some of Groves older siblings had already married with their own families. Groves, his mother and siblings relied on making a living of farm labor. Mary also collected a pension from Martin's service in the Army. Because of misspellings on the pension and other documents, most of the Grove family adopted the surname Groves. In 1869, Mary married Henry Cox, who was much older than herself.

Groves received some public schooling three months out of the year, but taught himself to read, write, and understand mathematics. As a freedman, with just 90 cents to his name, Groves ventured to Edwardsville, Kansas, during the Exodus of 1879, he married Matilda E. Stewart in 1880. The couple had 14 children, 12 of whom survived into adulthood. After working as a sharecropper, Groves began purchasing farmland in 1884; by 1905, his holdings included about 500 acres. He and Matilda grew the farm and were able to build a 22-room mansion on the property.

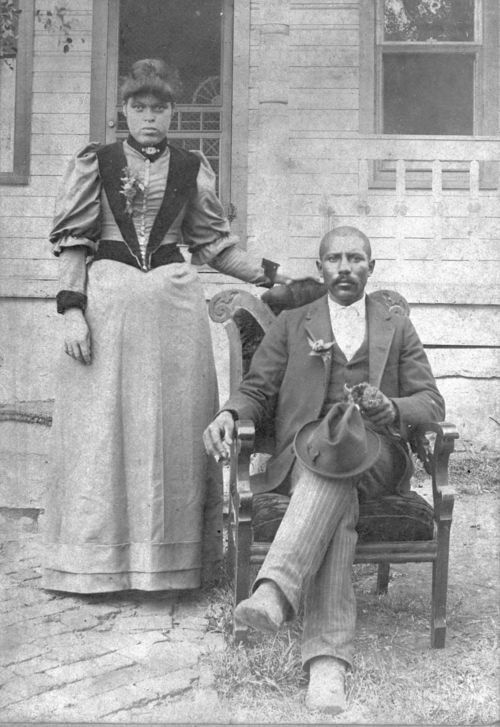
Junius and Matilda Groves.

Groves purchased and shipped produce—‌most famously potatoes—‌throughout North America. His other financial ventures included owning and operating a general goods store in Edwardsville, stock in mines in Indian Territory and New Mexico, and stock in Kansas banks; he also founded or co-founded the Negro Business League, the Pleasant Hill Baptist Church, the Kaw Valley Potato Association, and the Sunflower State Agricultural Association. Booker T. Washington, who featured Groves in his book The Negro in Business (1907), had high praise for him, describing Groves as "our most successful Negro farmer."

By 1902, Groves was considered the "Potato King of the World". His superior methods led to the production of 721,500 bushels of the crop in a single year, out-producing anyone else in the world to that point. His worth was estimated at $80,000 in 1904 and at $300,000 in 1915; he is considered one of the most prosperous black Americans of the late nineteenth and early twentieth centuries. At the height of his success, he had constructed a 22-room mansion equipped with the latest comforts of the era.

Groves utilized his wealth and influence to combat racism. During the growing season, as many as 50 laborers—‌both black and white—‌worked on his farm. He founded a black American community center in Edwardsville and a golf course for black citizens, perhaps the first of its kind in the country.

Groves died of a heart attack at the age of 66. His funeral, one local newspaper reported, was the "largest ever in Edwardsville"; he is thought to be buried in Groves Cemetery, near the community center he founded.

=== Marriage and family ===
Junius Groves married Matilda Stewart in Jackson County, Missouri, on May 9, 1880. 12 of 15 of the couple's children lived to adulthood.

1.) Charles Groves (April 14, 1881 – April 10, 1912). Charles first married Perle Jones, daughter of G.W. Jones, the first African American male to serve as the County Attorney for Graham County, Kansas. Charles' second marriage was to Eliza Poston.

2.) Walter Purtee Groves (August 19, 1882 – April 10, 1970). Walter married British-American Alice Anderson, daughter of American actor and entertainer Arthur Abool Anderson.

3.) Frederick Elzra Groves (December 31, 1883 – August 1968).

4.) Ida M. Groves (April 1885 – aft. 1930).

5.) Ora Andrew Groves (November 5, 1886 – September 1970). Married Marcella Groves (no relation).

6.) Lillian Groves (April 1888 – aft. 19).

7.) Junius George Groves Jr (August 16, 1890 – March 11, 1965).

8.) Sylvester Groves (December 21, 1891 – aft. 1930).

9.) Etnia Groves (June 16, 1893 – March 22, 1961).

10.) John Arthur Groves (December 29, 1894 – June 30, 1962).

11.) Cornelius Vivian Groves (October 11, 1898 – March 1969).

12.) Theodore Washington Groves (March 10, 1903 – July 13, 1966).

=== Descendants ===
A notable descendant of Junius Groves include American basketball player Trent Lockett.
