= Bonner Springs, Kansas =

- City
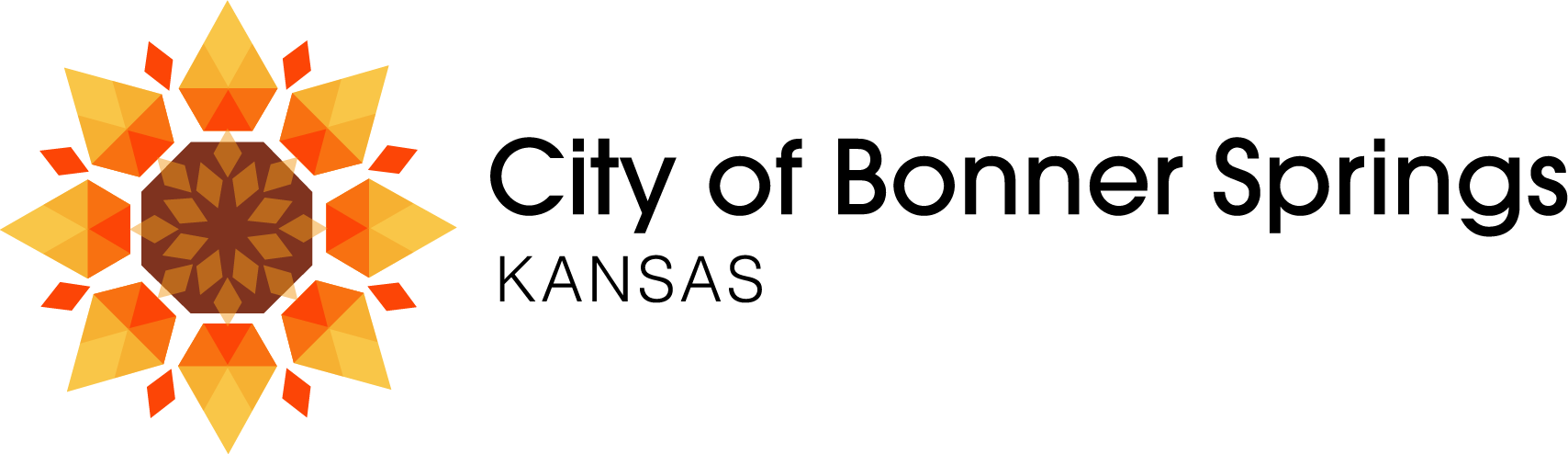
- Logo

- Location within Wyandotte County and Kansas
- Interactive map of Bonner Springs, Kansas
- Coordinates: 39°04′54″N 94°52′39″W
- Country: United States
- State: Kansas
- Counties: Wyandotte, Johnson, Leavenworth
- Settled: 1812
- Platted: 1855
- Incorporated: 1898
- Named for: Robert E. Bonner

Government
  - Type: Council-Manager

Area
  - Total: 16.00 sq mi (41.43 km^{2})
  - Land: 15.63 sq mi (40.48 km^{2})
  - Water: 0.37 sq mi (0.95 km^{2})
- Elevation: 997 ft (304 m)

Population (2020)
  - Total: 7,837
  - Density: 501.4/sq mi (193.6/km^{2})
- Time zone: UTC-6 (CST)
  - Summer (DST): UTC-5 (CDT)
- ZIP Code: 66012
- Area code: 913
- FIPS code: 20-07975
- GNIS ID: 485548
- Airport: Kansas City International Airport
- Website: bonnersprings.org

Bonner Springs is a city in Wyandotte, Leavenworth, and Johnson counties, Kansas, United States. It is part of the Kansas City, Missouri Metro Area. As of the 2020 census, the population of the city was 7,837. Bonner Springs was incorporated as a city on November 10, 1898. Bonner Springs is home to the Azura Amphitheater (previously named the Sandstone Amphitheater), the National Agricultural Center and Hall of Fame, Wyandotte County Park, Wyandotte County Historical Museum, and the annual Kansas City Renaissance Festival.

== History ==
=== Coronado ===
Spanish explorer Francisco Vázquez de Coronado spent the winter of 1541–1542 at what is now the area of Bonner Springs. The diary of Father Juan Padilla records that the expedition reached the 40th degree (Kansas northern border) and came to a great river (the Missouri). An inscription found on a stone near Atchison has been translated as, "Thus far came Francisco de Coronado, General of an Expedition." The explorers traveled downstream to the mouth of another great river, the Kansas, and preceded upstream 16 leagues to camp in what is now Bonner Springs before returning to Mexico. Due to the mineral springs, this legend gave the area its first recorded name, "Coronado Springs".

=== Early settlers ===
The Kanza people had settled the area because of the mineral springs and abundant fish and game when, in 1812, two French fur traders, the Chouteau brothers, made their way from St. Louis and temporally settled in the area that would eventually become Bonner Springs, starting a trading post named "Four Houses". The location allowed easy access to trade items, and a ferry to cross the Kansas River was added. With a date of 1812, it is reputed to be the first commercial center and permanent settlement in Kansas. In 1830, Henry Tiblow, a Delaware Indian, took charge of the ferry. Tiblow was a Delaware Indian who worked as an interpreter for the government. He lived in a small cabin on the west side of the city.

The location became known as "Tiblow Settlement", and the ferry continued working for years. John McDanield, or "Red John" due to hair color, is known as the founder of Bonner Springs - as we know it today. As the owner of a vast majority of land that is now Bonner Springs, McDaniel named the town "Tiblow", after his friend Henry.

=== Mineral springs ===
Several of the springs in the area were analysed for their mineral content, and the results indicated benefits that would attract visitors. The Bonner Springs Improvement Club, in 1907, created a promotional brochure touting the city as the "Kansas Karlsbad" and listing the contents of five springs near Lake of the Woods: Big Chief, Little Chief, Papoose, Old Squaw and Minnehaha. They listed "grains per gallon" of things like potassium sulphate, carbonate of iron, and chloride of sodium for each.

Big Chief was noted to be "splendid water for anemics, supplying the necessary properties for good red blood and driving out the dead and impure corpuscles."

Old Squaw was reportedly so named because "the old women of Indian tribes once living in Kansas found relief from their intense dyspepsia caused by their heavy meat diet and little or no exercise."

To promote the springs, a special train brought investors to the area and cited its proximity to Kansas City, the springs themselves, the fine parks and native trees, the site of a racetrack, and the beautiful residential sites as advantages that would assure the success of the mineral spring venture. In 1885, Philo Clark purchased 300 acres (120 ha) from McDanield, with plans to capitalize on the mineral springs, then changed the name of the town to "Bonner Springs". The latter portion of the name comes from a mineral spring in the area said to have medicinal qualities. The town was named after Robert E. Bonner, a publisher of the New York Ledger, who was a trotting-horse breeder of note, and Clark believed would help fund the proposed racetrack. However, there is no record this occurred.

=== Fire of 1908 ===
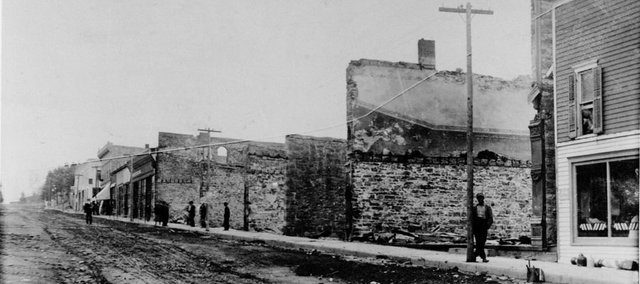
Citizens wander Oak Street, looking at the burned out buildings after the October 1908 fire

Bonner Springs continued to be prosperous, with a growing population and new businesses. In 1908, a fire caused over $70,000 worth of damage ($2.51 million in 2025 dollars) and destroyed between 19 and 21 local businesses. There were no water mains at the time, even though the city council had debated the issue for some time.

Many locals came to the rescue, forming a water bucket chain to help put out the fire, while they waited for a fire truck from Kansas City to arrive. An investigation indicated that materials behind Kelly & Pettit's Drug Store had caught on fire, and the winds carried the flames, making the fire difficult to control. Residents of Bonner Springs undertook thousands of dollars' worth of repairs.

== Geography ==
Bonner Springs is located primarily on the north side of the Kansas River. It is mainly in southwestern Wyandotte County, with small portions extending west into Leavenworth County and south across the Kansas River into Johnson County. It is bordered to the north by Kansas City, Kansas, to the east by Edwardsville, and to the south across the Kansas River by Shawnee. Interstate 70, the Kansas Turnpike, passes through the northern part of the city, with access from Exits 224 and 224A (U.S. Route 73 and Kansas Highway 7). I-70 leads east 17 miles (27 km) to Kansas City, Missouri, and west 21 miles (34 km) to Lawrence, while US-73 leads north 16 miles (26 km) to Leavenworth, and K-7 leads south the same distance to Olathe. K-32 runs through the center of Bonner Springs close to the Kansas River, leading east 4 miles (6 km) into Edwardsville and west 10 miles (16 km) to Linwood.

According to the United States Census Bureau, the city has a total area of 15.99 square miles (41.42 km^{2}), of which 15.98 square miles (41.40 km^{2}) are land and 0.36 square miles (0.93 km^{2}), or 2.26%, are water.

=== Climate ===
Bonner Springs has a humid continental climate, typically experiencing hot, humid summers and cold, dry winters.

Climate data for Bonner Springs, Kansas
Month	Jan	Feb	Mar	Apr	May	Jun	Jul	Aug	Sep	Oct	Nov	Dec	Year
Record high °F (°C)	74 (23)	81 (27)	85 (29)	91 (33)	95 (35)	105 (41)	114 (46)	107 (42)	106 (41)	98 (37)	84 (29)	76 (24)	114 (46)
Mean daily maximum °F (°C)	38 (3)	45 (7)	56 (13)	67 (19)	76 (24)	84 (29)	89 (32)	88 (31)	80 (27)	69 (21)	54 (12)	42 (6)	67 (19)
Mean daily minimum °F (°C)	20 (−7)	25 (−4)	35 (2)	45 (7)	55 (13)	64 (18)	69 (21)	67 (19)	58 (14)	47 (8)	35 (2)	24 (−4)	45 (7)
Record low °F (°C)	−18 (−28)	−12 (−24)	−8 (−22)	13 (−11)	30 (−1)	43 (6)	48 (9)	46 (8)	30 (−1)	18 (−8)	1 (−17)	−22 (−30)	−22 (−30)
Average precipitation inches (mm)	1.26 (32)	1.27 (32)	2.74 (70)	3.78 (96)	5.41 (137)	5.22 (133)	4.03 (102)	3.56 (90)	4.69 (119)	3.48 (88)	2.97 (75)	1.76 (45)	40.17 (1,020)
Average snowfall inches (cm)	5.70 (14.5)	4.00 (10.2)	2.90 (7.4)	0.50 (1.3)	0 (0)	0 (0)	0 (0)	0 (0)	0 (0)	0 (0)	1.10 (2.8)	3.00 (7.6)	17.20 (43.7)

== Demographics ==
Historical population
Census	Pop.	Note	%±
1900	609		—
1910	1,447		137.6%
1920	1,599		10.5%
1930	1,837		14.9%
1940	1,837		0.0%
1950	2,277		24.0%
1960	3,171		39.3%
1970	3,884		22.5%
1980	6,266		61.3%
1990	6,413		2.3%
2000	6,768		5.5%
2010	7,314		8.1%
2020	7,837		7.2%
2023 (est.)	7,621		−2.8%
U.S. Decennial Census; 2010-2020

=== Racial and ethnic composition ===
Bonner Springs city, Kansas – Racial and ethnic composition Note: the US Census treats Hispanic/Latino as an ethnic category. This table excludes Latinos from the racial categories and assigns them to a separate category. Hispanics/Latinos may be of any race.
Race / Ethnicity (NH = Non-Hispanic)	Pop 2000	Pop 2010	Pop 2020	% 2000	% 2010	% 2020
White alone (NH)	5,930	5,852	5,704	87.62%	80.01%	72.78%
Black or African American alone (NH)	258	381	509	3.81%	5.21%	6.49%
Native American or Alaska Native alone (NH)	47	62	69	0.69%	0.85%	0.88%
Asian alone (NH)	26	35	54	0.38%	0.48%	0.69%
Native Hawaiian or Pacific Islander alone (NH)	0	7	14	0.00%	0.10%	0.18%
Other race alone (NH)	2	2	26	0.03%	0.03%	0.33%
Mixed race or Multiracial (NH)	86	183	428	1.27%	2.50%	5.46%
Hispanic or Latino (any race)	419	792	1,033	6.19%	10.83%	13.18%
Total	6,768	7,314	7,837	100.00%	100.00%	100.00%

=== 2020 census ===
As of the 2020 census, Bonner Springs had a population of 7,837 people, with 3,037 households and 2,065 families. The population density was 501.4 per square mile (193.6/km^{2}). There were 3,202 housing units at an average density of 204.9 per square mile (79.1/km^{2}). 85.9% of residents lived in urban areas, while 14.1% lived in rural areas.

Among households, 33.6% had children under the age of 18 living in them. Of all households, 48.0% were married-couple households, 17.6% were households with a male householder and no spouse or partner present, and 27.2% were households with a female householder and no spouse or partner present. About 25.6% of all households were made up of individuals, and 9.8% had someone living alone who was 65 years of age or older. The average household size was 2.5 and the average family size was 3.1. Of all housing units, 5.2% were vacant. The homeowner vacancy rate was 0.5% and the rental vacancy rate was 7.6%.

The median age was 37.0 years. 24.7% of residents were under the age of 18 and 14.9% were 65 years of age or older. For every 100 females there were 91.5 males, and for every 100 females age 18 and over there were 90.3 males. The percentage of residents age 25 and older with a bachelor's degree or higher was 14.7%.

Racial composition as of the 2020 census
Race	Number	Percent
White	5,972	76.2%
Black or African American	525	6.7%
American Indian and Alaska Native	84	1.1%
Asian	58	0.7%
Native Hawaiian and Other Pacific Islander	14	0.2%
Some other race	297	3.8%
Two or more races	887	11.3%

White alone, not Hispanic or Latino, made up 72.9% of the population.

=== Income and poverty ===
The 2016–2020 5-year American Community Survey estimates show that the median household income was $68,250 (with a margin of error of +/- $6,872) and the median family income was $76,739 (+/- $8,487). Males had a median income of $50,227 (+/- $6,281) versus $36,654 (+/- $11,420) for females. The median income for those above 16 years old was $43,194 (+/- $7,382). Approximately, 8.0% of families and 11.2% of the population were below the poverty line, including 18.1% of those under the age of 18 and 4.9% of those ages 65 or over.

=== 2010 census ===
As of the census of 2010, there were 7,314 people, 2,810 households, and 1,917 families residing in the city. The population density was 465.0 inhabitants per square mile (179.5/km^{2}). There were 3,025 housing units at an average density of 192.3 per square mile (74.2/km^{2}). The racial makeup of the city was 84.8% White, 5.4% African American, 0.9% Native American, 0.5% Asian, 0.1% Pacific Islander, 5.0% from other races, and 3.3% from two or more races. Hispanic or Latino of any race were 10.8% of the population.

There were 2,810 households, of which 35.2% had children under the age of 18 living with them, 48.6% were married couples living together, 14.2% had a female householder with no husband present, 5.5% had a male householder with no wife present, and 31.8% were non-families. 25.7% of all households were made up of individuals, and 9.8% had someone living alone who was 65 years of age or older. The average household size was 2.59 and the average family size was 3.11.

The median age in the city was 35.7 years. 26.5% of residents were under the age of 18; 8.8% were between the ages of 18 and 24; 26.8% were from 25 to 44; 26.2% were from 45 to 64; and 11.8% were 65 years of age or older. The gender makeup of the city was 47.9% male and 52.1% female.

== Arts and culture ==
=== Azura Amphitheater ===
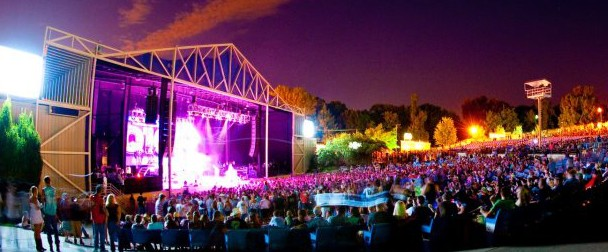
Azura Amphitheater (2015)

Bonner Springs is home to the Azura Amphitheater, first opened in 1984 as the Sandstone Amphitheater. This open-air venue can seat approximately 18,000 guests, including 3,100 private box and reserved seats, with a large grass lawn area at the rear of the amphitheater. The venue has undergone several renovations, including an improved layout for seating, and state-of-the-art, updated sound and video systems.

=== National Agricultural Center and Hall of Fame ===
National Agricultural Center and Hall of Fame (2014)

Bonner Springs is home to the National Agricultural Center and Hall of Fame, a privately funded charitable institution chartered by the U.S. Congress to "educate society on the historical and present value of American agriculture and to honor leadership in Agri-Business and Academia by providing education, information, experience and recognition."

=== Kansas City Renaissance Festival ===
The city is host of the annual Kansas City Renaissance Festival. The fair begins on Labor Day weekend and continues for seven weekends, open on Saturdays and Sundays as well as Labor Day and Columbus Day. The fair began in 1977 as a benefit for the Kansas City Art Institute, and became a stand-alone event in the late 1990s. The fair has 165 booths and 13 stages, entertaining 180,000 patrons annually on 16 operating days.

=== Wyandotte County Park ===
Wyandotte County Park has numerous picnic areas with A-frame structures. The park also includes soccer fields, tennis courts, a skate park, disc golf course, a model airplane flying area, and baseball diamonds. The Park is home to numerous attractions, including the Wyandotte County Museum and Historical Society, Trowbridge Archival Library, and the George Meyn Community Center.

=== Sunflower Hills Golf Course ===
Sunflower Hills Golf Course, opened in 1977, is an 18-hole course located at Wyandotte County Park. The championship Golf course was designed by renowned architect Roger Packard. Sunflower Hills is home to the Wyandotte County Open, the longest running tournament of its kind in the Greater Kansas City area.

The Junior golf course features six holes with three sets of tees, driving range, putting green and practice bunker.

=== Tiblow Days ===
Each year, during the last weekend of August, the city hosts Tiblow Days, a heritage festival in honor of early settler Henry Tiblow, and former namesake of the community.

== Government ==
The Bonner Springs City Council consists of nine members who are elected in non-partisan elections across four wards. The mayor is elected at large, and together with the council, select and appoint a professional city manager to operate the city. Operating as the legislative branch of the city, the council provides policy direction to the city manager.

The vast majority of Bonner Springs lies in Wyandotte County as the other parts of Bonner Springs lie in neighboring Leavenworth and Johnson County. Bonner Springs acts as an incorporated city - retaining its own government and autonomy - while also being part of the consolidated city-county government known as the "Unified Government". The UG consolidates the governmental functions of Wyandotte County and Kansas City, Kansas, under one entity, while also performing typical county government functions for the incorporated cities of Bonner Springs and Edwardsville.

== Education ==
The city is served by Bonner Springs–Edwardsville USD 204 public school district, which includes Bonner Springs High School, Robert E. Clark Middle School, and three elementary schools, Bonner Springs Elementary School, Delaware Ridge Elementary School, and Edwardsville Elementary school.

Bonner Springs residents also contribute to funding Kansas City Kansas Community College.

=== Public Library ===
The City of Bonner Springs operates one library, the Bonner Springs City Library.

== Infrastructure ==
=== Utilities ===
Bonner Springs is served by the following utilities:

- Natural Gas Service - Atmos.
- Electrical Service - Evergy.
- Water & Sewer Service - City of Bonner Springs supplies water and sewer service to the city.
- Cable Television - Spectrum Internet and AT&T
- Telephone Service - Spectrum Internet and AT&T.

== Transportation ==
See related article: voy:Kansas City (Missouri) at Wikivoyage

River transportation was important to early Bonner Springs, as its location directly on the Kansas River afforded easy access to trade. A portion of Interstate 70 was the first project in the United States completed under the provisions of the new Federal-Aid Highway Act of 1956 (though not the first constructed or to begin construction). Bonner Springs is located directly on or near several transportation corridors including roadways, rail, and river access.

=== Road transportation ===
Bonner Springs is served directly by two interstate highways, three national highways and three state highways:

- I-70
- I-435
- US-24
- US-40
- US-73
- K-5
- K-7
- K-32
- State Avenue

=== Direct routes ===
Bonner Springs is served with direct routes to one interstate highway, two state highways and one national highway:

- I-635
- K-10
- US-59

== Notable people ==
Notable individuals who were born in and/or have lived in Bonner Springs include:

- Gene Clark (1944–1991), singer and founding member of The Byrds
- David Jaynes (born 1952), football quarterback
- Ed Nealy (born 1960), basketball power forward
- Myra Taylor (1917–2011), jazz singer-songwriter
- Bobby Watson (born 1953), saxophonist
- Freddie Williams II (born 1977), comic book writer and artist

== See also ==
- Great Flood of 1951
