= Wyandotte County, Kansas =

County in Kansas, United States

- Consolidated city-county
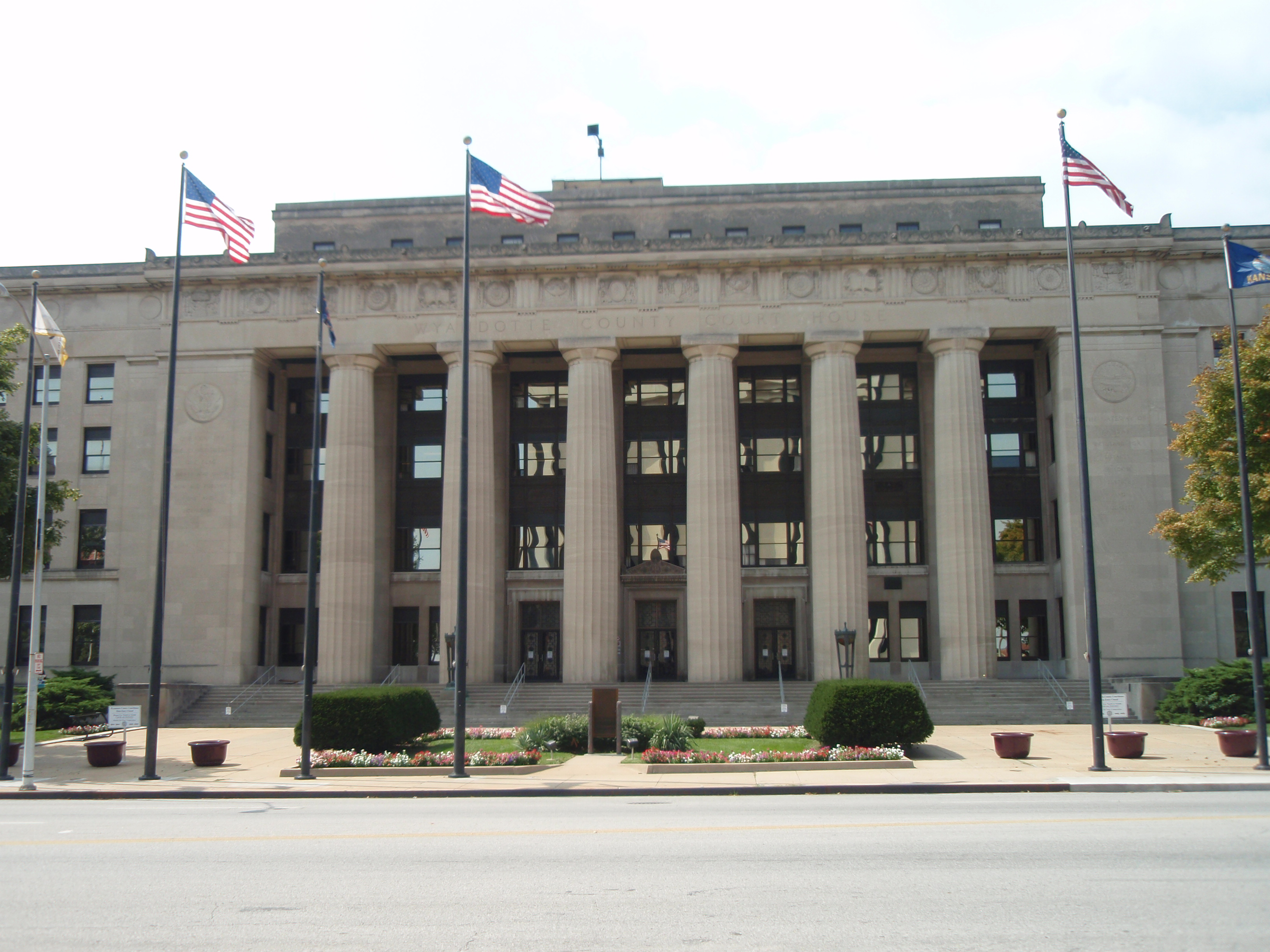
- Wyandotte County Courthouse in Kansas City (2009)

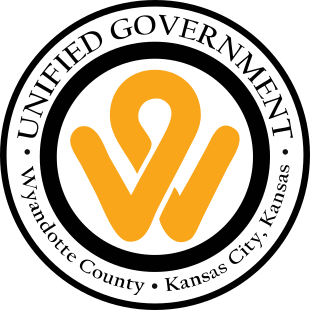
- Flag Seal

- Location within the U.S. state of Kansas
- Coordinates: 39°07′N 94°43′W
- Country: United States
- State: Kansas
- Founded: January 29, 1859; 167 years ago
- Named for: Wyandot people
- Seat: Kansas City
- Largest city: Kansas City

Area
  - Total: 156 sq mi (400 km^{2})
  - Land: 152 sq mi (390 km^{2})
  - Water: 4.6 sq mi (12 km^{2}) 2.9%

Population (2020)
  - Total: 169,245
  - Estimate (2025): 170,597 ▲
  - Density: 1,087/sq mi (420/km^{2})
- Time zone: UTC−6 (Central)
  - Summer (DST): UTC−5 (CDT)
- Congressional districts: 2nd, 3rd
- Website: wycokck.org

Wyandotte County (/ˈwaɪ.əndɒt/) is a county in the U.S. state of Kansas. Its county seat and most populous city is Kansas City, with which it shares a unified government. As of the 2020 census, the population was 169,245, making it Kansas's fourth-most populous county. The county was named after the Wyandot tribe.

== History ==
=== Wyandot tribe ===
The county is named after the Wyandot (also Wyandott or Wyandotte) Indians. They were called the Huron by the French in Canada, but called themselves Wendat. They were distantly related to the Iroquois, with whom they sometimes fought. They had hoped to keep white Americans out of their territory and to make the Ohio River the border between the United States and Canada.

One branch of the Wyandot moved to the area that is now the state of Ohio. They generally took the course of assimilation into Anglo-American society. Many of them embraced Christianity under the influence of missionaries. They were transported to the current Wyandotte County in 1843, where they set up a community and worked in cooperation with Anglo settlers. The Christian Munsee also influenced this area's early settlement.

The Wyandot in Kansas set up a constitutional form of government they had devised in Ohio. They set up the territorial government for Kansas and Nebraska, and elected one of their own territorial governor.

=== Other historical facts ===
The county was organized in 1859. Tenskwatawa (Tecumseh's brother), "the Prophet", fought at the Battle of Tippecanoe in 1811. He was buried at Shawnee Native American historical site Whitefeather Spring, at 3818 Ruby Ave. Kansas City, which was added to the National Register of Historic Places in 1975. The Kansas City Smelting and Refining Company employed over 250 men during the 1880s. The ore and base bullion is received from the mountains' mining districts and is crushed, separated and refined.

The Delaware Crossing (or "Military Crossing"; sometimes "the Secondine") was where the old Indian trail met the waters of the Kaw River. Circa 1831, Moses Grinter, one of the area's earliest permanent white settlers, set up the Grinter Ferry on the Kansas River there. His house was known as the Grinter Place. The ferry was used by traders, freighters, and soldiers traveling between Fort Leavenworth and Fort Scott on the military road. Others crossed this area on their way to Santa Fe.

The Diocese of Leavenworth moved its see from Leavenworth, Kansas to Kansas City, Kansas on May 10, 1947. It became an archdiocese on August 9, 1952.

In January 2025, Wyandotte County was the epicenter of the largest tuberculosis outbreak in United States history according to the Kansas Department of Health and Environment (KDHE).

== Geography ==
According to the United States Census Bureau, the county has an area of 156 square miles (400 km^{2}), of which 152 square miles (390 km^{2}) is land and 4.6 square miles (12 km^{2}) (2.9%) is water. It is Kansas's smallest county by area.

=== Topography ===
The county's natural topography consists of gently rolling terrain. The Kansas River forms part of the county's southern boundary. The elevation generally increases from south to north as the distance from the Kansas River and Missouri River increases.

=== Watersheds and streams ===
Mission Creek watershed

The county is drained by natural creek and stream watersheds of the Kaw River, which is part of the Missouri River basin. It receives plentiful rainfall.

Turkey Creek is a stream spanning Johnson and Wyandotte counties. The creek has disastrously flooded the area through all measurable history, including several cities in the Upper Turkey Creek Basin, for which the U.S. Army Corps of Engineers has developed complicated flood control deployments and ongoing proposals, including major drainage at Rosedale, KCK.

=== Adjacent counties ===
- Platte County, Missouri (north)
- Clay County, Missouri (northeast)
- Jackson County, Missouri (east)
- Johnson County (south)
- Leavenworth County (west)

== Demographics ==
Historical population
Census	Pop.	Note	%±
1860	2,609		—
1870	10,015		283.9%
1880	19,143		91.1%
1890	54,407		184.2%
1900	73,227		34.6%
1910	100,068		36.7%
1920	122,218		22.1%
1930	141,211		15.5%
1940	145,071		2.7%
1950	165,318		14.0%
1960	185,495		12.2%
1970	186,845		0.7%
1980	172,335		−7.8%
1990	161,993		−6.0%
2000	157,882		−2.5%
2010	157,505		−0.2%
2020	169,245		7.5%
2025 (est.)	170,597	▲	0.8%
U.S. Decennial Census; 1790–1960 1900–1990; 1990–2000 2010–2020

Wyandotte County is included in the Kansas City, MO-KS Kansas City metropolitan area.

=== Racial and ethnic composition ===
Wyandotte County, Kansas – Racial and ethnic composition Note: the US Census treats Hispanic/Latino as an ethnic category. This table excludes Latinos from the racial categories and assigns them to a separate category. Hispanics/Latinos may be of any race.
Race / Ethnicity (NH = Non-Hispanic)	Pop 1980	Pop 1990	Pop 2000	Pop 2010	Pop 2020	% 1980	% 1990	% 2000	% 2010	% 2020
White alone (NH)	120,568	103,955	81,534	68,170	63,079	69.96%	64.17%	51.64%	43.28%	37.27%
Black or African American alone (NH)	41,210	44,131	44,328	39,046	33,945	23.91%	27.24%	28.08%	24.79%	20.06%
Native American or Alaska Native alone (NH)	809	966	892	793	725	0.47%	0.60%	0.56%	0.50%	0.43%
Asian alone (NH)	718	1,787	2,513	3,886	7,621	0.42%	1.10%	1.59%	2.47%	4.50%
Native Hawaiian or Pacific Islander alone (NH)	x	x	39	147	364	x	x	0.02%	0.09%	0.22%
Other race alone (NH)	930	157	217	183	573	0.54%	0.10%	0.14%	0.12%	0.34%
Mixed race or Multiracial (NH)	x	x	3,102	3,647	7,124	x	x	1.96%	2.32%	4.21%
Hispanic or Latino (any race)	8,100	10,997	25,257	41,633	55,814	4.70%	6.79%	16.00%	26.43%	32.98%
Total	172,335	161,993	157,882	157,505	169,245	100.00%	100.00%	100.00%	100.00%	100.00%

=== 2020 census ===
As of the 2020 census, the county had a population of 169,245. The median age was 34.5 years. 27.0% of residents were under the age of 18 and 12.7% of residents were 65 years of age or older. For every 100 females there were 99.6 males, and for every 100 females age 18 and over there were 97.9 males age 18 and over.

The racial makeup of the county was 43.6% White, 20.4% Black or African American, 1.1% American Indian and Alaska Native, 4.6% Asian, 0.2% Native Hawaiian and Pacific Islander, 15.2% from some other race, and 14.9% from two or more races. Hispanic or Latino residents of any race comprised 33.0% of the population.

94.7% of residents lived in urban areas, while 5.3% lived in rural areas.

There were 61,835 households in the county, of which 35.0% had children under the age of 18 living with them and 30.3% had a female householder with no spouse or partner present. About 28.8% of all households were made up of individuals and 10.2% had someone living alone who was 65 years of age or older.

There were 68,475 housing units, of which 9.7% were vacant. Among occupied housing units, 57.2% were owner-occupied and 42.8% were renter-occupied. The homeowner vacancy rate was 1.7% and the rental vacancy rate was 9.5%.

=== 2000 census ===
The 2000 census recorded 157,882 people, 59,700 households, and 39,163 families residing in the county. The population density was 1,043 people per square mile (403 people/km^{2}). There were 65,892 housing units at an average density of 435 per square mile (168/km^{2}). The racial makeup of the county was 58.18% White, 28.33% Black or African American, 1.63% Asian, 0.74% Native American, 0.04% Pacific Islander, 8.17% from other races, and 2.91% from two or more races. Hispanic or Latino of any race were 16.00% of the population.

By 2007, 48.1% of Wyandotte County's population was non-Hispanic white. 26.3% of the population was African-American. Native Americans made up 0.6% of the population, Asians 1.8%, and Latinos 21.7%.

There were 59,700 households, of which 32.60% had children under the age of 18 living with them, 42.10% were married couples living together, 17.80% had a female householder with no husband present, and 34.40% were non-families. 28.90% of all households were made up of individuals, and 10.00% had someone living alone who was 65 years of age or older. The average household size was 2.62 and the average family size was 3.24.

In the county, 28.50% of residents were under the age of 18, 10.40% from 18 to 24, 29.50% from 25 to 44, 19.90% from 45 to 64, and 11.70% were 65 years of age or older. The median age was 32. For every 100 females there were 95.40 males. For every 100 females age 18 and over, there were 91.3 males.

The median income for a household in the county was $33,784, and the median income for a family was $40,333. Males had a median income of $31,335 versus $24,640 for females. The per capita income for the county was $16,005. About 12.5% of families and 16.5% of the population were below the poverty line, including 23% of those under age 18 and 11.1% of those 65 or older.

Approximately 1.4% of the county's residents took public transportation to work in 2002. This was the highest percentage in the state.

== Government ==
=== Law ===
The Wyandotte County Sheriff's Office oversees the Wyandotte County Jail. The Bonner Springs Police Department, Edwardsville Police Department, Lake Quivira Police Department, and the Kansas City, Kansas Police Department serve those respective cities in Wyandotte County.

The Kansas City Kansas Community College Police Department, Kansas City Kansas Public Schools Police Department, and the University of Kansas Medical Center Police Department are also independent law enforcement agencies in the county.

Wyandotte County was a prohibition, or "dry", county until the Kansas Constitution was amended in 1986 and voters approved the sale of liquor by the individual drink with a 30% food sales requirement. Voters removed the food sales requirement in 1988.

The county voted against the 2022 Kansas abortion referendum, an anti-abortion ballot measure, by 74% to 26%, outpacing its support of Joe Biden during the 2020 presidential election.

=== Local government ===
In 1997, residents voted to consolidate the municipal government of Kansas City, Kansas and county government of Wyandotte into a single unified government, combining many duplicative public departments. Voters at the time largely decided the municipal government harbored widespread corruption and patronage, and that consolidation with the better run county offered a path toward better public services and increased government transparency.

The governing body of Wyandotte County consists of a Mayor/CEO and ten Commissioners.

Mayor/CEO

- Christal E. Watson

Board of Commissioners

- At-Large District 1: Melissa Bynum
- At-Large District 2: Andrew Kump
- District 1: Jermaine Howard
- District 2: William J. Burns
- District 3: Christian Ramirez
- District 4: Evelyn Hill
- District 5: Carlos Pacheco
- District 6: Philip J. Lopez
- District 7: Chuck Stites
- District 8: Andrew Davis

=== Presidential elections ===
Presidential election results

United States presidential election results for Wyandotte County, Kansas
Year	Republican		Democratic		Third party(ies)	
Year	No.	%	No.	%	No.	%
1880	2,410	55.09%	1,729	39.52%	236	5.39%
1884	3,232	56.33%	2,301	40.10%	205	3.57%
1888	5,431	55.41%	4,155	42.39%	215	2.19%
1892	5,889	51.10%	0	0.00%	5,635	48.90%
1896	6,852	49.44%	6,882	49.65%	126	0.91%
1900	8,133	51.75%	7,304	46.47%	280	1.78%
1904	9,147	64.18%	3,815	26.77%	1,290	9.05%
1908	8,684	47.56%	8,923	48.87%	652	3.57%
1912	2,107	11.18%	7,370	39.10%	9,371	49.72%
1916	13,863	41.86%	17,850	53.89%	1,408	4.25%
1920	19,294	57.25%	13,737	40.76%	671	1.99%
1924	23,881	59.48%	8,913	22.20%	7,354	18.32%
1928	32,829	65.69%	16,884	33.78%	265	0.53%
1932	25,471	43.30%	32,629	55.47%	721	1.23%
1936	26,239	40.62%	38,101	58.98%	256	0.40%
1940	28,152	42.24%	38,239	57.38%	252	0.38%
1944	26,817	44.74%	32,914	54.91%	214	0.36%
1948	24,398	36.53%	41,366	61.94%	1,024	1.53%
1952	34,648	47.04%	38,751	52.61%	258	0.35%
1956	34,604	47.64%	37,842	52.10%	186	0.26%
1960	34,764	45.27%	41,433	53.95%	604	0.79%
1964	20,553	31.45%	43,442	66.47%	1,356	2.07%
1968	23,091	33.38%	34,189	49.43%	11,891	17.19%
1972	34,157	52.70%	28,206	43.52%	2,453	3.78%
1976	23,141	36.99%	37,478	59.91%	1,936	3.09%
1980	23,012	38.21%	32,763	54.40%	4,448	7.39%
1984	27,459	42.81%	36,042	56.20%	635	0.99%
1988	19,097	32.70%	38,678	66.23%	624	1.07%
1992	12,872	21.06%	34,397	56.27%	13,855	22.67%
1996	14,011	28.22%	31,252	62.94%	4,391	8.84%
2000	14,024	29.05%	32,411	67.14%	1,837	3.81%
2004	17,919	33.56%	34,923	65.40%	559	1.05%
2008	16,506	28.75%	39,865	69.44%	1,038	1.81%
2012	15,496	30.45%	34,302	67.40%	1,095	2.15%
2016	15,806	32.40%	30,146	61.80%	2,829	5.80%
2020	18,934	33.18%	36,788	64.46%	1,349	2.36%
2024	18,867	37.29%	30,938	61.14%	797	1.58%

Unlike almost every other county in Kansas, Wyandotte County has been solidly Democratic ever since the New Deal. This is largely due to its highly urbanized nature and significant minority population. The only Democrat to lose Wyandotte County since 1932 has been George McGovern in Richard Nixon's 49-state landslide of 1972, when Nixon swept all 275 counties in Oklahoma, Kansas, and Nebraska. Wyandotte was the only county in Kansas to vote for Franklin D. Roosevelt in 1944, Adlai Stevenson II in both 1952 and 1956, Hubert Humphrey in 1968, Jimmy Carter in 1980, and Walter Mondale in 1984. No Republican presidential nominee has received even 40% of the vote since Ronald Reagan in 1984. Democratic strength is primarily concentrated east of Interstate 435, while areas west of the highway, especially the neighborhoods of Piper and Wolcott, lean Republican.

== Economy ==
Village West is at the intersection of Interstates 70 and 435, and has significantly fueled growth in KCK and Wyandotte County. Anchored by the Kansas Speedway, its attractions and retailers include Hollywood Casino, Legends Outlets Kansas City, Cabela's, Nebraska Furniture Mart, Great Wolf Lodge, Legends Field (hosting the Monarchs of the American Association of baseball) and Sporting Park (hosting Sporting Kansas City of Major League Soccer).

Other attractions include Azura Amphitheater (formerly and still commonly known as the Sandstone Amphitheater), the National Agricultural Center and Hall of Fame, Wyandotte County Park, and Sunflower Hills Golf Course.

Beginning in 2031, Wyandotte County will also include the new home stadium for the Kansas City Chiefs of the National Football League.

=== Colleges and universities ===
Public

- Kansas City Kansas Community College
- University of Kansas Medical Center

Private

- Donnelly College

=== School districts ===
- Turner USD 202
- Piper USD 203
- Bonner Springs–Edwardsville USD 204
- Kansas City USD 500

=== Private schools ===
Primary

- Resurrection Grade School (formerly St. Peter's Cathedral Grade School)
- St. Patrick's Grade School
- Christ the King Grade School (Closed)

Secondary

- Bishop Ward High School

=== Other schools ===
- Kansas State School for the Blind (KSSB)

== Transportation ==
=== Major highways ===
- I-35
- I-70 / Kansas Turnpike
- I-435
- I-635
- I-670 (also called I-70 Alternate)
- US-24 / US-40
- US-69
- US-73
- US-169
- K-5
- K-7
- K-32

=== Public transportation ===
- RideKC

== Communities ==
Wyandotte County, Kansas 1899 Map

These are townships, incorporated cities, unincorporated communities, and extinct former communities within Wyandotte County.

=== Cities ===
- Bonner Springs (also in Leavenworth and Johnson counties)
- Edwardsville
- Kansas City (county seat)
- Lake Quivira (also in Johnson County)

=== Neighborhoods ===
- Argentine
- Armourdale
- Armstrong
- Fairfax
- Muncie
- Pomeroy
- Piper
- Riverview
- Rosedale
- Strawberry Hill
- Turner

=== Unincorporated Area ===
Delaware Township is the sole township of Wyandotte County. The cities of Bonner Springs, Edwardsville, Kansas City, and Lake Quivira are considered governmentally independent and excluded from Delaware Township.

Township	FIPS	Population	Population density /km^{2} (/sq mi)	Land area km^{2} (sq mi)	Water area km^{2} (sq mi)	Geographic coordinates
Delaware	17475	31	12.76 (4.93)	2.42 (6.3)	0.36 (0.93)	39°01′18″N 94°54′00″W
Sources: "Wyandotte County, Kansas - Kansas Historical Society". Kshs.org.

In 2010, the Kansas State Historical Society confirmed Edwardsville's departure from the township.

== See also ==
- National Register of Historic Places listings in Wyandotte County, Kansas
