= 1956 United States presidential election in Kansas =

- November 6, 1956

All 8 Kansas votes to the Electoral College

Nominee	Dwight D. Eisenhower	Adlai Stevenson
Party	Republican	Democratic
Home state	Pennsylvania (Note: Although he was born in Texas and grew up in Kansas before his military career, at the time of the 1952 election Eisenhower was president of Columbia University and was, officially, a resident of New York. During his first term as president, he moved his private residence to Gettysburg, Pennsylvania, and officially changed his residency to Pennsylvania.)	Illinois
Running mate	Richard Nixon	Estes Kefauver
Electoral vote	8	0
Popular vote	566,878	296,317
Percentage	65.44%	34.21%
County results
Eisenhower
50–60%
60–70%
70–80%
80–90%
Stevenson
50–60%
President before election
Dwight D. Eisenhower
Republican
Elected President
Dwight D. Eisenhower
Republican

The 1956 United States presidential election in Kansas took place on November 6, 1956, as part of the 1956 United States presidential election. Voters chose eight representatives, or electors, to the Electoral College, who voted for president and vice president.

Kansas was won by incumbent President Dwight D. Eisenhower (R–Pennsylvania), running with Vice President Richard Nixon, with 65.44 percent of the popular vote, against Adlai Stevenson (D–Illinois), running with Senator Estes Kefauver, with 34.21 percent of the popular vote. Eisenhower, as expected, had no trouble carrying his boyhood home state, winning every county in the state except Wyandotte County, having spent his formative years in Abilene.

With 65.44 percent of the popular vote, Kansas proved to be Eisenhower's fifth strongest state after Vermont, Maine, New Hampshire and Nebraska.

== Results ==
1956 United States presidential election in Kansas
Party	Candidate	Votes	%
Republican	Dwight D. Eisenhower (inc.)	566,878	65.44%
Democratic	Adlai Stevenson	296,317	34.21%
Prohibition	Enoch Holtwick	3,048	0.35%
Total votes		866,243	100%

=== Results by county ===
County	Dwight D. Eisenhower Republican		Adlai Stevenson Democratic		Enoch Holtwick Prohibition		Margin		Total votes cast
County	#	%	#	%	#	%	#	%	Total votes cast
Allen	5,342	71.15%	2,143	28.54%	23	0.31%	3,199	42.61%	7,508
Anderson	3,080	69.01%	1,369	30.67%	14	0.31%	1,711	38.34%	4,463
Atchison	5,608	64.08%	3,134	35.81%	9	0.10%	2,474	28.27%	8,751
Barber	2,698	68.32%	1,241	31.43%	10	0.25%	1,457	36.89%	3,949
Barton	8,644	66.17%	4,378	33.51%	41	0.31%	4,266	32.66%	13,063
Bourbon	5,306	62.39%	3,151	37.05%	47	0.55%	2,155	25.34%	8,504
Brown	5,138	76.95%	1,519	22.75%	20	0.30%	3,619	54.20%	6,677
Butler	9,591	60.73%	6,158	38.99%	45	0.28%	3,433	21.74%	15,794
Chase	1,553	74.45%	529	25.36%	4	0.19%	1,024	49.09%	2,086
Chautauqua	2,180	70.85%	887	28.83%	10	0.32%	1,293	42.02%	3,077
Cherokee	5,824	58.39%	4,112	41.22%	39	0.39%	1,712	17.17%	9,975
Cheyenne	1,479	68.79%	663	30.84%	8	0.37%	816	37.95%	2,150
Clark	1,243	69.83%	529	29.72%	8	0.45%	714	40.11%	1,780
Clay	4,378	80.17%	1,034	18.93%	49	0.90%	3,344	61.24%	5,461
Cloud	4,466	68.61%	2,008	30.85%	35	0.54%	2,458	37.76%	6,509
Coffey	3,286	72.24%	1,247	27.41%	16	0.35%	2,039	44.83%	4,549
Comanche	1,238	72.40%	461	26.96%	11	0.64%	777	45.44%	1,710
Cowley	6,734	63.93%	3,753	35.63%	46	0.44%	2,981	28.30%	10,533
Crawford	9,578	54.93%	7,799	44.73%	60	0.34%	1,779	10.20%	17,437
Decatur	2,028	68.58%	920	31.11%	9	0.30%	1,108	37.47%	2,957
Dickinson	7,422	74.91%	2,452	24.75%	34	0.34%	4,970	50.16%	9,908
Doniphan	3,130	72.14%	1,197	27.59%	12	0.28%	1,933	44.55%	4,339
Douglas	11,029	71.85%	4,283	27.90%	39	0.25%	6,746	43.95%	15,351
Edwards	1,816	69.93%	771	29.69%	10	0.39%	1,045	40.24%	2,597
Elk	1,909	69.90%	812	29.73%	10	0.37%	1,097	40.17%	2,731
Ellis	4,466	59.33%	3,058	40.62%	4	0.05%	1,408	18.71%	7,528
Ellsworth	2,524	64.90%	1,351	34.74%	14	0.36%	1,173	30.16%	3,889
Finney	3,576	66.87%	1,752	32.76%	20	0.37%	1,824	34.11%	5,348
Ford	5,561	66.84%	2,710	32.57%	49	0.59%	2,851	34.27%	8,320
Franklin	6,557	71.42%	2,591	28.22%	33	0.36%	3,966	43.20%	9,181
Geary	4,013	65.54%	2,078	33.94%	32	0.52%	1,935	31.60%	6,123
Gove	1,315	72.29%	492	27.05%	12	0.66%	823	45.24%	1,819
Graham	1,676	69.49%	725	30.06%	11	0.46%	951	39.43%	2,412
Grant	1,058	69.47%	459	30.14%	6	0.39%	599	39.33%	1,523
Gray	1,278	66.77%	627	32.76%	9	0.47%	651	34.01%	1,914
Greeley	599	77.09%	174	22.39%	4	0.51%	425	54.70%	777
Greenwood	4,164	70.01%	1,763	29.64%	21	0.35%	2,401	40.37%	5,948
Hamilton	865	60.66%	552	38.71%	9	0.63%	313	21.95%	1,426
Harper	3,111	69.99%	1,311	29.49%	23	0.52%	1,800	40.50%	4,445
Harvey	7,367	70.20%	3,084	29.39%	43	0.41%	4,283	40.81%	10,494
Haskell	829	70.49%	341	29.00%	6	0.51%	488	41.49%	1,176
Hodgeman	1,113	71.62%	435	27.99%	6	0.39%	678	43.63%	1,554
Jackson	3,469	71.72%	1,356	28.03%	12	0.25%	2,113	43.69%	4,837
Jefferson	3,677	70.24%	1,536	29.34%	22	0.42%	2,141	40.90%	5,235
Jewell	3,395	75.51%	1,034	23.00%	67	1.49%	2,361	52.51%	4,496
Johnson	35,511	71.40%	14,185	28.52%	37	0.07%	21,326	42.88%	49,733
Kearny	854	66.98%	418	32.78%	3	0.24%	436	34.20%	1,275
Kingman	3,226	69.08%	1,428	30.58%	16	0.34%	1,798	38.50%	4,670
Kiowa	1,717	76.18%	517	22.94%	20	0.89%	1,200	53.24%	2,254
Labette	7,677	59.35%	5,202	40.21%	57	0.44%	2,475	19.14%	12,936
Lane	992	72.09%	380	27.62%	4	0.29%	612	44.47%	1,376
Leavenworth	8,826	61.55%	5,480	38.22%	33	0.23%	3,346	23.33%	14,339
Lincoln	2,219	76.20%	681	23.39%	12	0.41%	1,538	52.81%	2,912
Linn	2,991	71.64%	1,177	28.19%	7	0.17%	1,814	43.45%	4,175
Logan	1,328	72.61%	493	26.95%	8	0.44%	835	45.66%	1,829
Lyon	8,021	67.34%	3,831	32.16%	59	0.50%	4,190	35.18%	11,911
McPherson	7,521	73.75%	2,603	25.52%	74	0.73%	4,918	48.23%	10,198
Marion	5,318	75.99%	1,644	23.49%	36	0.51%	3,674	52.50%	6,998
Marshall	5,664	69.25%	2,487	30.41%	28	0.34%	3,177	38.84%	8,179
Meade	1,720	74.30%	575	24.84%	20	0.86%	1,145	49.46%	2,315
Miami	5,031	59.30%	3,428	40.41%	25	0.29%	1,603	18.89%	8,484
Mitchell	3,198	72.16%	1,214	27.39%	20	0.45%	1,984	44.77%	4,432
Montgomery	13,252	64.34%	7,265	35.27%	81	0.39%	5,987	29.07%	20,598
Morris	2,677	68.55%	1,208	30.93%	20	0.51%	1,469	37.62%	3,905
Morton	814	64.76%	436	34.69%	7	0.56%	378	30.07%	1,257
Nemaha	4,195	67.11%	2,038	32.60%	18	0.29%	2,157	34.51%	6,251
Neosho	5,886	65.99%	3,005	33.69%	29	0.33%	2,881	32.30%	8,920
Ness	1,876	70.79%	758	28.60%	16	0.60%	1,118	42.19%	2,650
Norton	3,052	71.58%	1,194	28.00%	18	0.42%	1,858	43.58%	4,264
Osage	4,136	67.28%	1,979	32.19%	32	0.52%	2,157	35.09%	6,147
Osborne	2,948	73.72%	1,023	25.58%	28	0.70%	1,925	48.14%	3,999
Ottawa	2,329	68.80%	1,037	30.64%	19	0.56%	1,292	38.16%	3,385
Pawnee	2,788	63.73%	1,567	35.82%	20	0.46%	1,221	27.91%	4,375
Phillips	3,117	75.49%	985	23.86%	27	0.65%	2,132	51.63%	4,129
Pottawatomie	4,335	74.97%	1,422	24.59%	25	0.43%	2,913	50.38%	5,782
Pratt	3,620	64.53%	1,956	34.87%	34	0.61%	1,664	29.66%	5,610
Rawlins	1,668	69.88%	711	29.79%	8	0.34%	957	40.09%	2,387
Reno	15,057	66.56%	7,461	32.98%	102	0.45%	7,596	33.58%	22,620
Republic	3,621	68.76%	1,613	30.63%	32	0.61%	2,008	38.13%	5,266
Rice	4,638	70.48%	1,926	29.27%	17	0.26%	2,712	41.21%	6,581
Riley	9,385	76.84%	2,784	22.80%	44	0.36%	6,601	54.04%	12,213
Rooks	3,059	70.88%	1,238	28.68%	19	0.44%	1,821	42.20%	4,316
Rush	2,007	64.87%	1,080	34.91%	7	0.23%	927	29.96%	3,094
Russell	3,920	71.78%	1,528	27.98%	13	0.24%	2,392	43.80%	5,461
Saline	11,172	69.32%	4,908	30.45%	37	0.23%	6,264	38.87%	16,117
Scott	1,376	75.11%	451	24.62%	5	0.27%	925	50.49%	1,832
Sedgwick	72,292	61.08%	45,732	38.64%	336	0.28%	26,560	22.44%	118,360
Seward	2,885	70.95%	1,162	28.58%	19	0.47%	1,723	42.37%	4,066
Shawnee	32,647	66.52%	16,298	33.21%	130	0.26%	16,349	33.31%	49,075
Sheridan	1,324	67.41%	633	32.23%	7	0.36%	691	35.18%	1,964
Sherman	1,825	64.97%	962	34.25%	22	0.78%	863	30.72%	2,809
Smith	3,142	72.95%	1,139	26.45%	26	0.60%	2,003	46.50%	4,307
Stafford	2,728	68.37%	1,242	31.13%	20	0.50%	1,486	37.24%	3,990
Stanton	549	70.20%	226	28.90%	7	0.90%	323	41.30%	782
Stevens	1,273	69.00%	565	30.62%	7	0.38%	708	38.38%	1,845
Sumner	7,024	62.95%	4,088	36.64%	46	0.41%	2,936	26.31%	11,158
Thomas	1,888	62.06%	1,138	37.41%	16	0.53%	750	24.65%	3,042
Trego	1,668	69.41%	726	30.21%	9	0.37%	942	39.20%	2,403
Wabaunsee	2,650	76.63%	802	23.19%	6	0.17%	1,848	53.44%	3,458
Wallace	684	72.69%	251	26.67%	6	0.64%	433	46.02%	941
Washington	4,220	74.81%	1,389	24.62%	32	0.57%	2,831	50.19%	5,641
Wichita	747	70.41%	312	29.41%	2	0.19%	435	41.00%	1,061
Wilson	4,502	73.00%	1,645	26.67%	20	0.32%	2,857	46.33%	6,167
Woodson	2,171	70.88%	870	28.40%	22	0.72%	1,301	42.48%	3,063
Wyandotte	34,604	47.64%	37,842	52.10%	186	0.26%	-3,238	-4.46%	72,632
Totals	566,878	65.44%	296,317	34.21%	3,048	0.35%	270,561	31.23%	866,243

== See also ==
- United States presidential elections in Kansas
