= Edwardsville, Kansas =

- City
- Entrance sign in Edwardsville (2016)

- Location within Wyandotte County and Kansas
- Interactive map of Edwardsville, Kansas
- Coordinates: 39°3′48″N 94°48′52″W
- Country: United States
- State: Kansas
- County: Wyandotte
- Platted: 1869
- Incorporated: 1915

Area
  - Total: 9.36 sq mi (24.23 km^{2})
  - Land: 9.04 sq mi (23.41 km^{2})
  - Water: 0.32 sq mi (0.82 km^{2})
- Elevation: 781 ft (238 m)

Population (2020)
  - Total: 4,717
  - Density: 521.9/sq mi (201.5/km^{2})
- Time zone: UTC-6 (CST)
  - Summer (DST): UTC-5 (CDT)
- ZIP Codes: 66111, 66113
- Area code: 913
- FIPS code: 20-20000
- GNIS ID: 478886
- Website: edwardsvilleks.org

Edwardsville is a city in Wyandotte County, Kansas, United States, and part of the Kansas City Metropolitan Area. As of the 2020 census, the population of the city was 4,717.

== History ==
Edwardsville was surveyed in 1869 on land formerly belonging to Half Moon, an Indian chief of the Delawares. It was named for John H. Edwards, a general passenger agent for the Union Pacific Railroad, who later served as a justice of the peace and state senator from Ellis County, Kansas.

== Geography ==
Edwardsville is located at 39°03′48″N 94°48′52″W (39.063428, -94.814347). According to the United States Census Bureau, the city has a total area of 9.36 square miles (24.24 km^{2}), of which 9.04 square miles (23.41 km^{2}) is land and 0.32 square miles (0.83 km^{2}) is water.

== Demographics ==
Historical population
Census	Pop.	Note	%±
1880	106		—
1920	203		—
1930	228		12.3%
1940	243		6.6%
1950	274		12.8%
1960	513		87.2%
1970	619		20.7%
1980	3,364		443.5%
1990	3,979		18.3%
2000	4,146		4.2%
2010	4,340		4.7%
2020	4,717		8.7%
U.S. Decennial Census

Edwardsville is part of the Kansas City Metropolitan Area and is part of a unified local government, which also contains Kansas City, Kansas, a portion of Bonner Springs, and roughly one quarter of Lake Quivira.

=== Racial and ethnic composition ===
Edwardsville city, Kansas – Racial and ethnic composition Note: the US Census treats Hispanic/Latino as an ethnic category. This table excludes Latinos from the racial categories and assigns them to a separate category. Hispanics/Latinos may be of any race.
Race / Ethnicity (NH = Non-Hispanic)	Pop 2000	Pop 2010	Pop 2020	% 2000	% 2010	% 2020
White alone (NH)	3,639	3,602	3,357	87.77%	83.00%	71.17%
Black or African American alone (NH)	200	260	330	4.82%	5.99%	7.00%
Native American or Alaska Native alone (NH)	15	29	37	0.36%	0.67%	0.78%
Asian alone (NH)	10	36	55	0.24%	0.83%	1.17%
Native Hawaiian or Pacific Islander alone (NH)	0	4	3	0.00%	0.09%	0.06%
Other race alone (NH)	3	2	10	0.07%	0.05%	0.21%
Mixed race or Multiracial (NH)	81	90	311	1.95%	2.07%	6.59%
Hispanic or Latino (any race)	198	317	614	4.78%	7.30%	13.02%
Total	4,146	4,340	4,717	100.00%	100.00%	100.00%

=== 2020 census ===
As of the 2020 census, Edwardsville had a population of 4,717, with 1,682 households and 1,181 families. The population density was 521.9 per square mile (201.5/km^{2}), and there were 1,786 housing units at an average density of 197.6 per square mile (76.3/km^{2}).

The median age was 36.9 years. Age distribution was 25.6% under 18, 8.1% from 18 to 24, 27.6% from 25 to 44, 25.5% from 45 to 64, and 13.2% age 65 or older. For every 100 females, there were 98.7 males, and for every 100 females age 18 and over, there were 97.9 males.

80.2% of residents lived in urban areas, while 19.8% lived in rural areas.

Of all households, 39.2% had children under the age of 18 living in them, 46.7% were married-couple households, 20.9% were households with a male householder and no spouse or partner present, and 22.7% were households with a female householder and no spouse or partner present. About 23.5% of all households were made up of individuals, and 8.8% had someone living alone who was 65 years of age or older.

Of all housing units, 5.8% were vacant. The homeowner vacancy rate was 1.8% and the rental vacancy rate was 5.3%.

Racial composition as of the 2020 census
Race	Number	Percent
White	3,516	74.5%
Black or African American	348	7.4%
American Indian and Alaska Native	46	1.0%
Asian	57	1.2%
Native Hawaiian and Other Pacific Islander	3	0.1%
Some other race	174	3.7%
Two or more races	573	12.1%

The non-Hispanic White share of the population was 71.17%.

=== Demographic estimates ===
The average household size was 2.6 and the average family size was 3.1. The percent of those with a bachelor's degree or higher was estimated to be 16.0% of the population.

=== Income and poverty ===
The 2016–2020 5-year American Community Survey estimates show that the median household income was $74,063 (with a margin of error of +/- $15,784) and the median family income was $79,048 (+/- $14,162). Males had a median income of $53,031 (+/- $10,476) versus $37,616 (+/- $4,386) for females. The median income for those above 16 years old was $41,081 (+/- $2,268). Approximately, 5.7% of families and 8.2% of the population were below the poverty line, including 8.4% of those under the age of 18 and 10.8% of those ages 65 or over.

=== 2010 census ===
As of the census of 2010, there were 4,340 people, 1,632 households, and 1,107 families residing in the city. The population density was 480.1 inhabitants per square mile (185.4/km^{2}). There were 1,716 housing units at an average density of 189.8 per square mile (73.3/km^{2}). The racial makeup of the city was 86.6% White, 6.0% African American, 0.8% Native American, 0.8% Asian, 0.1% Pacific Islander, 2.8% from other races, and 2.9% from two or more races. Hispanic or Latino of any race were 7.3% of the population.

There were 1,632 households, of which 35.9% had children under the age of 18 living with them, 49.4% were married couples living together, 12.9% had a female householder with no husband present, 5.5% had a male householder with no wife present, and 32.2% were non-families. 26.2% of all households were made up of individuals, and 9.4% had someone living alone who was 65 years of age or older. The average household size was 2.55 and the average family size was 3.06.

The median age in the city was 36.9 years. 25.6% of residents were under the age of 18; 7.3% were between the ages of 18 and 24; 27.6% were from 25 to 44; 26.7% were from 45 to 64; and 12.7% were 65 years of age or older. The gender makeup of the city was 48.6% male and 51.4% female.

== Government ==
The city of Edwardsville maintains a full scope of emergency services. It has a police department with officers on-duty 24 hours a day, 365 days a year. The fire department serves the citizens and visitors of the cities of Edwardsville, Bonner Springs, and western Kansas City. It is staffed by 17 full-time, seven part-time personnel and five volunteers. The department has fire code inspectors, and provides advance life support through its two ambulances.

== Education ==
The community is served by Bonner Springs–Edwardsville USD 204 public school district.

== Notable people ==
- Junius George Groves (1859–1925), businessman and farmer, lived in Edwardsville.
