= Piper, Kansas City, Kansas =

Neighborhood in Kansas City, Kansas, U.S.

Coordinates: 39°08′35″N 94°51′41″W

Piper is a neighborhood within Kansas City, Kansas, United States. Before Piper was annexed in 1991, it was formerly an unincorporated semi-rural area, similar to Turner.

== History ==
Piper was first laid out as a village in 1888. A post office was opened in Piper in 1888, and remained in operation until it was discontinued in 1971.

== Education ==
The community is served by Piper USD 203 public school district. Piper High School, Piper Middle School, Piper Prairie Elementary School, Piper Creek Elementary School and the Early Childhood Center at the District Office comprise the district. These schools are the first in the nation to have Google Fiber bandwidth.

The Piper Pirates 2012-2013 football team won its first regional bracket. Piper USD 203 shares Wyandotte County's school districts with 3 other school districts. Kansas City, Kansas City USD 500, Bonner Springs–Edwardsville USD 204, and Turner USD 202.

== Notable people ==
- Eric Stonestreet - Actor, alumnus of Piper High School.
