= Bonner Springs–Edwardsville USD 204 =

Public school district in Bonner Springs, Kansas

Address
- 2200 S. 138th Street Bonner Springs, Kansas, 66012; United States
- Coordinates: 39.06145°N 94.90120°W

District information
- Type: Public
- Grades: PreK to 12
- Schools: 7

Other information
- Website: usd204.net

Bonner Springs–Edwardsville USD 204 is a public unified school district headquartered in Bonner Springs, Kansas, United States. The district includes portions of the cities of Bonner Springs, Edwardsville, Kansas City, and nearby rural areas.

== Schools ==
The school district operates the following schools:

- Bonner Springs High School
- Clark Middle School
- Bonner Springs Elementary School
- Delaware Ridge Elementary School
- Edwardsville Elementary School
- McDanield Preschool Center
- Head Start

== See also ==
- Kansas State Department of Education
- Kansas State High School Activities Association
- List of high schools in Kansas
- List of unified school districts in Kansas
