= Lake Quivira, Kansas =

- City
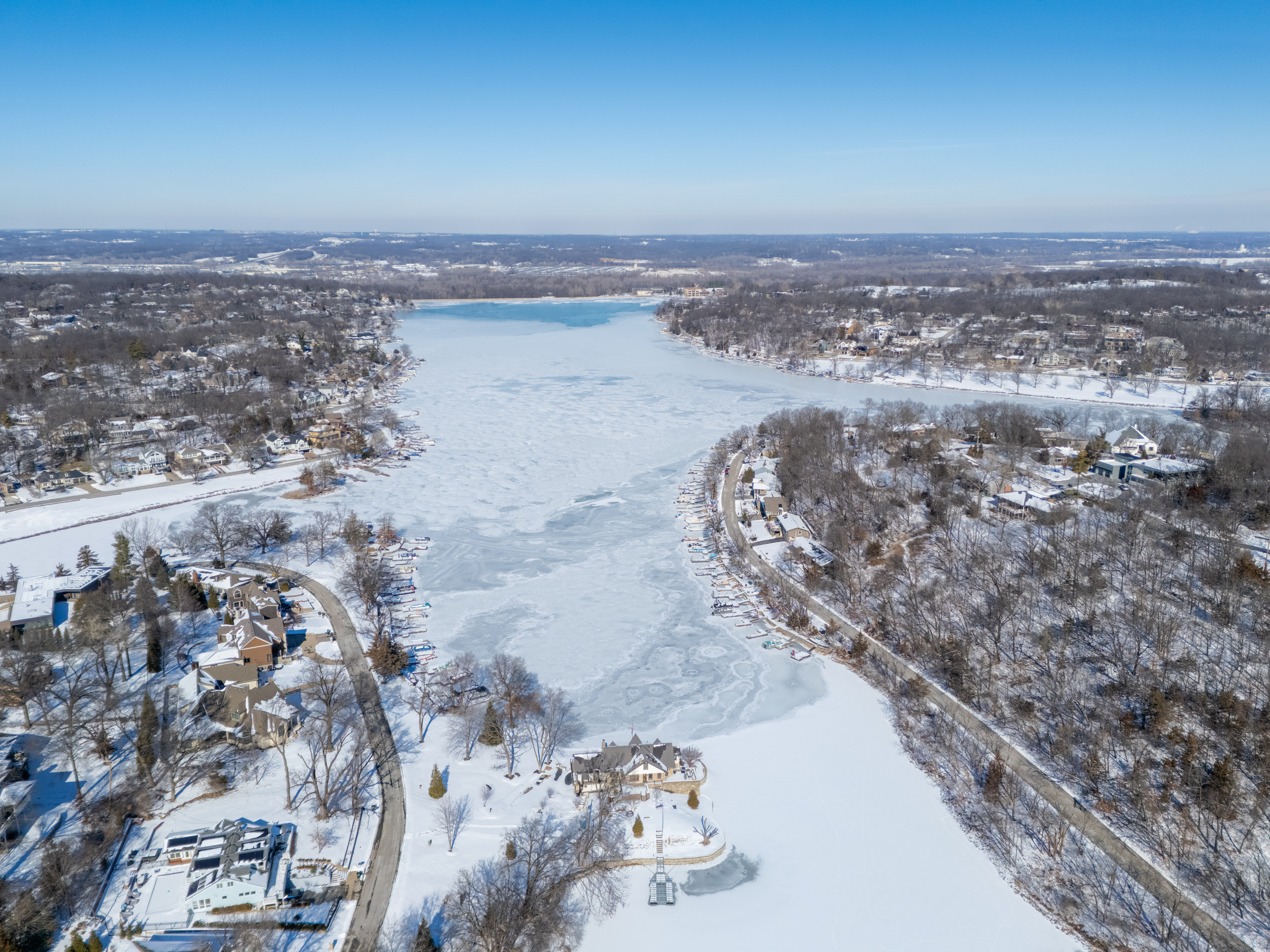
- Aerial view in the wintertime (2026)

- Location within Johnson County and Kansas
- Interactive map of Lake Quivira, Kansas
- Coordinates: 39°2′33″N 94°46′11″W
- Country: United States
- State: Kansas
- Counties: Johnson, Wyandotte
- Founded: 1920s
- Incorporated: 1971

Area
  - Total: 1.63 sq mi (4.21 km^{2})
  - Land: 1.47 sq mi (3.82 km^{2})
  - Water: 0.15 sq mi (0.39 km^{2})
- Elevation: 906 ft (276 m)

Population (2020)
  - Total: 1,014
  - Density: 687/sq mi (265/km^{2})
- Time zone: UTC-6 (CST)
  - Summer (DST): UTC-5 (CDT)
- ZIP Code: 66217
- Area code: 913
- FIPS code: 20-37975
- GNIS ID: 484917
- Website: cityoflakequivira.org

Lake Quivira /ˈleɪk kwɪˈvɪərə/ is a city in Johnson and Wyandotte counties in the State of Kansas. As of the 2020 census, the population of the city was 1,014.

== History ==
Lake Quivira had its start in the 1920s when the developer Charles E. Gault and others set out to construct a subdivision on an artificial lake.

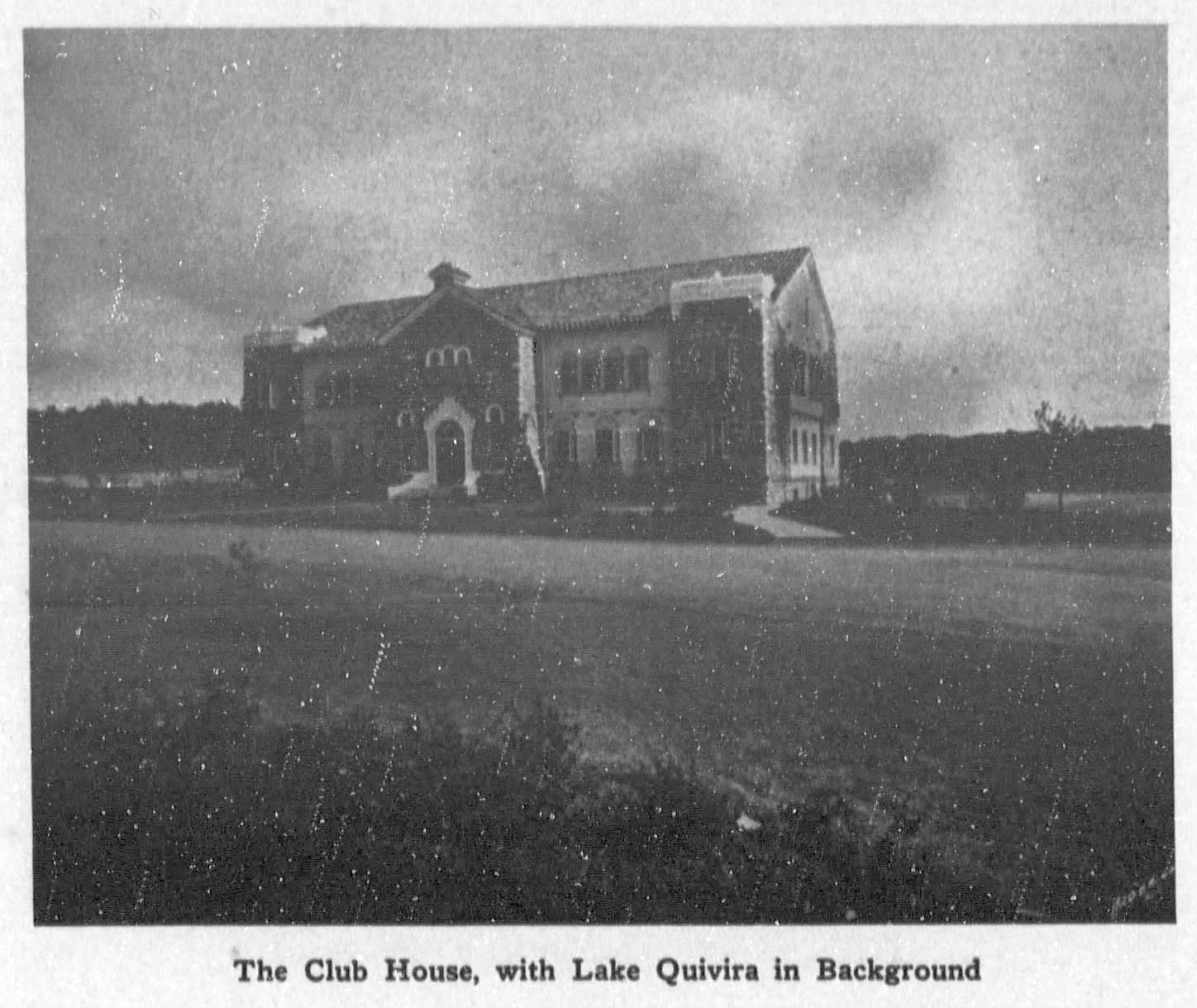
Clubhouse at Lake Quivira (1930)

== Geography ==
According to the United States Census Bureau, the city has a total area of 1.56 square miles (4.04 km^{2}), of which 1.41 square miles (3.65 km^{2}) is land and 0.15 square miles (0.39 km^{2}) is water.

== Demographics ==
Historical population
Census	Pop.	Note	%±
1980	1,087		—
1990	983		−9.6%
2000	932		−5.2%
2010	906		−2.8%
2020	1,014		11.9%
U.S. Decennial Census

Lake Quivira is part of the Kansas City Metropolitan Area.

=== Racial and ethnic composition ===
Lake Quivira city, Kansas – Racial and ethnic composition Note: the US Census treats Hispanic/Latino as an ethnic category. This table excludes Latinos from the racial categories and assigns them to a separate category. Hispanics/Latinos may be of any race.
Race / Ethnicity (NH = Non-Hispanic)	Pop 2000	Pop 2010	Pop 2020	% 2000	% 2010	% 2020
White alone (NH)	887	866	914	95.17%	95.58%	90.14%
Black or African American alone (NH)	8	5	6	0.86%	0.55%	0.59%
Native American or Alaska Native alone (NH)	0	5	4	0.00%	0.55%	0.39%
Asian alone (NH)	5	7	12	0.54%	0.77%	1.18%
Native Hawaiian or Pacific Islander alone (NH)	0	0	0	0.00%	0.00%	0.00%
Other race alone (NH)	0	1	1	0.00%	0.11%	0.10%
Mixed race or Multiracial (NH)	13	6	34	1.39%	0.66%	3.35%
Hispanic or Latino (any race)	19	16	43	2.04%	1.77%	4.24%
Total	932	906	1,014	100.00%	100.00%	100.00%

=== 2020 census ===
The 2020 United States census counted 1,014 people, 374 households, and 319 families in Lake Quivira. The population density was 687.0 per square mile (265.2/km^{2}). There were 405 housing units at an average density of 274.4 per square mile (105.9/km^{2}). The racial makeup was 90.83% (921) white or European American (90.14% non-Hispanic white), 0.59% (6) black or African-American, 0.39% (4) Native American or Alaska Native, 1.18% (12) Asian, 0.0% (0) Pacific Islander or Native Hawaiian, 0.1% (1) from other races, and 6.9% (70) from two or more races. Hispanic or Latino of any race was 4.24% (43) of the population.

Of the 374 households, 29.9% had children under the age of 18; 78.6% were married couples living together; 8.3% had a female householder with no spouse or partner present. 12.8% of households consisted of individuals and 8.0% had someone living alone who was 65 years of age or older. The average household size was 2.8 and the average family size was 3.0. The percent of those with a bachelor's degree or higher was estimated to be 61.3% of the population.

22.5% of the population was under the age of 18, 6.8% from 18 to 24, 11.2% from 25 to 44, 34.0% from 45 to 64, and 25.4% who were 65 years of age or older. The median age was 51.5 years. For every 100 females, there were 93.9 males. For every 100 females ages 18 and older, there were 91.7 males.

The 2016–2020 5-year American Community Survey estimates show that the median household income was $153,750 (with a margin of error of +/- $41,805) and the median family income was $183,750 (+/- $56,623). Males had a median income of $121,250 (+/- $15,372) versus $58,750 (+/- $30,731) for females. The median income for those above 16 years old was $89,375 (+/- $27,059). Approximately, 2.4% of families and 3.4% of the population were below the poverty line, including 4.5% of those under the age of 18 and 2.8% of those ages 65 or over.

=== 2010 census ===
As of the census of 2010, there were 906 people, 365 households, and 304 families living in the city. The population density was 642.6 inhabitants per square mile (248.1/km^{2}). There were 395 housing units at an average density of 280.1 per square mile (108.1/km^{2}). The racial makeup of the city was 96.4% White, 0.6% African American, 0.7% Native American, 0.8% Asian, 0.8% from other races, and 0.9% from two or more races. Hispanic or Latino of any race were 1.8% of the population.

There were 365 households, of which 27.4% had children under the age of 18 living with them, 80.5% were married couples living together, 1.9% had a female householder with no husband present, 0.8% had a male householder with no wife present, and 16.7% were non-families. 13.4% of all households were made up of individuals, and 7.9% had someone living alone who was 65 years of age or older. The average household size was 2.48 and the average family size was 2.73.

The median age in the city was 52.9 years. 21.3% of residents were under the age of 18; 3.2% were between the ages of 18 and 24; 11.8% were from 25 to 44; 37.7% were from 45 to 64; and 26.2% were 65 years of age or older. The gender makeup of the city was 51.4% male and 48.6% female.
