= Florida Agricultural Hall of Fame =

Hall of fame in Tampa, Florida, USA

- Abbreviation: FAHOF
- Formation: 1979
- Founder: Robert Morris, Richard Kelly & Elton Hinton
- Type: not-for-profit
- Registration no.: 59-3280221
- Purpose: honor individuals who made lasting contributions to Florida agriculture
- Headquarters: 600 N Broadway Ave Suite 101, Bartow, Florida
- Location: Tampa, Florida, U.S.
- Coordinates: 27°54′5″N 81°50′33″W
- Region served: Florida
- President: Ray Hodge
- Vice President: Judi Whitson
- Treasurer: Kevin Metheny
- Secretary: Mike Morris
- Affiliations: Florida Farm Bureau, Institute of Food and Agricultural Sciences, Florida Department of Agriculture and Consumer Services
- Website: https://floridaaghalloffame.org/

The Florida Agricultural Hall of Fame (FAHOF) celebrates Floridians who have made outstanding contributions to the agriculture and food industry and publicizes the importance of their achievements in the state. It shows off a variety of Florida's agricultural products and commodities. Florida Agriculture contributes $160 billion in economic activity and supports 2.5 million jobs.

== History ==
Robert Morris, Richard Kelly and Elton Hinton established the Florida Agricultural Hall of Fame in 1979 to identify and honor those individuals who have made significant contributions to agriculture in Florida. The organization is run by volunteers and utilizes a building with their name located at the Florida State Fairgrounds in Tampa. The assumption is that the FAHOF features ranchers and farmers, but such is not the case. Agriculturists including researchers, inventors, educators and state agents join growers and cattlemen for the honor. The first class of honorees was inaugurated in 1980.

== Breakfast ==
The FAHOF hosts a breakfast, "Fresh from Florida" on the opening day of the fair. The Flip the Switch event, which officially opens the fair, either precedes or follows the breakfast. Guests include leaders from agriculture and state and local government officials and the Florida Commissioner of Agriculture. Speakers talk about Florida agriculture and the future.

== Banquet ==
The association chooses at least two inductees each year from all the nominations. During the February Florida State Fair in Tampa, an induction and portrait unveiling ceremony is held during the annual dinner banquet where the life and accomplishments of the year's inductees are celebrated. The FAHOF also supports youth, specifically FFA and 4-H members, who show interest and potential in agriculture. Part of the banquet's profits fund agricultural scholarships and opportunities for mentoring in the Youth Mentor Program. Numerous youths also receive complimentary banquet attendance to meet industry leaders.

== Gallery ==
Since 1980, the Florida Department of Agriculture in Tallahassee was home to the gallery where the HOF displays portraits of its inductees along with their biographical notes. In 1995–1996, the gallery moved to a permanent home in the Florida Agricultural Hall of Fame Building in the Tampa Fairgrounds complex. The gallery is open to the public during the fair in February but can only be visited by appointment during the rest of the year.

== List of Inductees ==
Name(s)	Attribute	County	Year
Alto "Bud" Lee Adams, Jr.	environmental stewardship and wildlife preservation; developed heat-adaptive Braford cattle breed	St. Lucie	1999
Thomas Burton Adams Jr.	Magnolia Farms; president of FARM Foundation; State Senator; Agricultural Re-Organization Act; funded IFAS	Brevard	2000
Karl Albritton	Albritton Fruit Company developed mechanical equipment for harvest/packing of citrus	Polk	1993
Richard Alger	Ran potato packinghouse, a sweet corn hydro-cooler and a farm shop.supporter of agricultural research and technology	Miami-Dade	2010
C. D. Atkins	perfected the method of producing frozen concentrated orange juice	Polk	1986
Leroy Baldwin	Angus beef cattle producer, breeder, promoter	Marion	1995
Thomas "Richard" Barber Jr.	Peanut and watermelon grower, cattle rancher, agriculture promoter and lobbyist	Marion	2004
Raymond B. Becker	cattle micronutrient requirements, converting citrus processing leftovers into cattle feed	Alachua	1983
Al Bellotto	proponent of Beef Checkoff program; freeze branding; wastewater irrigation	Polk	2001
Don Bennink	Florida dairyman; worked with UF College of Veterinary Medicine research breeding & productivity	Gilchrist	2019
Jack M. Berry	citrus exporter; 100,000 acres expansion of citrus into flatwoods in South Florida	Lee	2000
Vick and Faye Blackstone	Vick-Florida Rodeo Cowboy of the Year Faye-famous barrel racer and trick rider; cattle & horse rancher	Manatee	2004
Bill Boardman	dairy farmer and leader of Florida's dairy industry; Dairy Farmers Inc. exec VP; promoted milk	Orange	2007
Daniel Botts	Florida Fruit and Vegetable Association, advocate for Florida agriculture; assisted phaseout of methyl bromide	Orange	2013
John Buckner Boy, Sr.	president of U.S. Sugar, the largest cane milling operation in US expanded into cattle, vegetables, citrus and sod	Hendry	1988
Thomas H. Braddock	cattle and timber, created winter Interval feeding; Agriculture Extension Service leader, TV show, endowment to UF	Duval	2016
Reggie Brown	Extension Service agent; Florida Fruit & Vegetable Association manager; Florida Tomato Exchange leader	Alachua	2022
Charles Bronson	cattle rancher, State Senate and Florida Agriculture Commissioner;	Madison	2013
Irlo Bronson Sr.	fourth generation of cattlemen charter member Florida Cattlemen's Association; donated the HQ land	Osceola	1981
Neal Palmer "Pal" Brooks	leading producer of tropical fruit; first use of hydro-cooler on avocados; first use of hot water for anthracnose	Miami-Dade	1996
Scottie Butler	Florida Farm Bureau Federation general counsel; worked with FFA and lectured in Ag Law at UF	Alachua	2014
Edward J. Campbell	Land preservation and cleanup	Dade	1992
Clarence L. Campbell, Jr.	38 years as state veterinarian; helped eradicatecattle fever tick, screwworm and brucellosis	Leon	1995
Bill & Trudy Carey	Carey Cattle Co, Russell's Dairy, Carey Beef, Carey Feedlot, Carey Agri-International. volunteered with ag & youth orgs.	Hillsborough	2011
Doyle E. Carlton Jr.	Florida State Senator and cattleman who convinced the senate to fund a pilot program to eradicate the screwworm fly	Osceola	1991
Bruce Christmas	Cooperative Extension Agent; director UF Poultry Evaluation Center doing research	Washington	2014
"Pete" Clemons	former rodeo star, citrus grower and rancher, owner/operator of the Okeechobee Livestock Market	Okeechobee	2008
Pat Cockrell	agriculture teacher and Florida Farm Bureau leader; 4-H and FFA leader; IFAS advisor	Alachua	2011
Doyle Conner	Florida Commissioner of Agriculture 1961-1991	Jefferson	1985
William Cook	Great South Timber and Lumber; helped found Florida Forestry Foundation; Florida Forestry Teachers' Tour	Nassau	2017
J. Francis Cooper	36 years with the Florida Agricultural Experiment Stations and the Cooperative Extension Service	Alachua	1981
Clinton Huxley Coulter, Sr	State Forester creation of State Forests, a slash pine nursery and expanded forestry by 10x	Leon	1985
Tony J. Cunha	UF chairman of animal science faculty expanded scope of topics that improved the Florida livestock industry	Alachua	1991
Laurence Paul Cutts	Bee keeper, breeder, expert, State Agriculture expert; solved bee pest problems	Washington	2012
B. Edmund David Jr.	Angus cattle breeder; president Florida Angus Association; President Florida International Agricultural Trade Council		1986
James M. Davidson	soil scientist at Institute of Food and Agricultural Sciences researcher, writer, administrator	Alachua	2005
Roy Gene Davis	wholesale nurseries; donated time, talents, money, plant material, equipment, and staff to 4-H, FFA, Florida State Fair	Hillsborough	2006
Snead Young Mathews Davis	bred Polled Hereford cattle using universal health practices and state-of-the-art breeding	Alacuha	1996
Paul Beary Dickman	first tomato packinghouse in Ruskin. His 3,000 acres included citrus, cattle	Hillsborough	1988
Hugh Fred Dietrich III	cattle rancher, an agricultural educator and an auctioneer; leader in agricultural organizations	Orange	2020
Paul J. DiMare	"Mr. Tomato," is the largest grower of fresh-market tomatoes in the US; industry leader and promoter	Miami-Dade	2005
John, Andrew Jr., & Ferdinand Duda	farming & packinghouse machinery, quality standards and professional marketing, new plant varieties, farming techniques, better pay	Brevard	1985
Edward, Ferdinand S. & Joseph Duda	third generation of A. Duda & Sons; President, CEO & Chairman of the Board; civic & industry organization membership	Seminole	2015
Bernard A. Egan	Citrus grower and exporter	Indian River	2002
Hugh English	career at A. Duda & Sons helped develop citrus industry; ran packinghouse and frozen concentrate plant	Hendry	2008
Alfonso and J. Pepe Fanjul	sugarcane farming; founded Florida Crystals; rice mill, packaging/distribution center, biomass power plant	Palm Beach	2018
Willard M. Fifield	agricultural researcher and educator Provost of Agriculture at the University of Florida from 1955 until 1962	Alachua	1982
Edwin Hall "Ed" Finlayson	county agent, discovered, named and introduced Pensacola Bahia grass	Madison	1980
John M. Fox	Utilize freeze-damaged citrus for concentrate		1983
Bob Fuchs	Orchid grower, breeder, judge, worldwide	Miami-Dade	2012
Jeffrey Dewey “Jeff” Gargiulo	former chairman of the Produce Marketing Association, president of Florida Tomato Growers, president of Florida Fruit & Vegetable Association, president and CEO of Sunkist Growers	Collier	2027
Richard Gaskalla	director, Florida Department of Agriculture's Plant Industry; defense plant pests, diseases, markets and the environment	Flagler	2019
Henry Gatrell	largest swine exporter in the US; donationed swine breeding herds at UFlorida & Florida A&M; supported ag youth pgms		1996
Thomas Gilbert Lee	revered Orlando dairyman	Orange	1980
William A. "Bill" Graham	first president, Independent Diary Farmers Association; pioneered new technology artificial insemination in Angus cattle	Miami-Dade	2000
J.R. "Rip" Graves	banking and citrus executive and administrator	Indian River	2002
Barnette E. "Barney" Green, Jr.	cattle rancher and citrus grower; new cattle breed, the Romana Red; Ocean Spray grapefruit juice	Indian River	1996
Albert Greenberg	founder of Florida's aquaculture with tropical fish and plants; left company to employees, donated Eureka Springs Park	Hillsborough	2007
Ben Hill Griffin Jr.	largest agricultural enterprises in Florida citrus & cattle made contributions to citrus research and education	Highlands	1987
Ben Hill Griffin III	citrus producer, Florida agribusiness Alico, cattle company, ranch and timberland, Griffin Fertilizer	Polk	2010
James Griffiths	Florida citrus industry researcher, grower, industry rep; industry watchdog	Polk	2009
Lynetta & Ken Griner	Attorney and Car dealer (respectively) who took over the family agribusiness following her brother's death. Both held numerous agricultural leadership positions for three decades.	Levy	2027
Copeland Griswold	pioneer of Florida's cotton industry; leader in conservation tillage; Northwest Florida Water Mgt District	Santa Rosa	2001
Miles Edward Groover	born on farm, became public school teacher and first African-American county agriculture agent;	Jefferson	1998
Rudy Hamrick	Agricultural extension agent, rejuvenated local agriculture in 1970s; Agriculture professor at UF	Madison	2010
Peter S. Harllee	improved tomato varieties by working with IFAS	Manatee	1989
Robert Henry Harms	UF Poultry science teacher, researcher. Determined poultry nutrition requirements in hot climates	Alachua	1990
Bert J. Harris, Jr.	citrus grower and rancher; grew Caladiums & farming consultant; State Rep; championed private property rights	Highlands	1999
Wayne Hawkins	Florida fruit and vegetable leader, established growers exchanges, manager Florida Tomato, worked with FFA, 4-H	Orange	2007
Joe Marlin Hilliard	Cattle, citrus, sugarcane; developed land by allowing farmers to clear & farm 2 years; research with IFAS	Hendry	2017
Elton L. Hinton	developing the instructional curriculum for vocational agriculture in Florida; youth careers in Ag	Hillsborough	1994
Charles F. "Chip" Hinton	mentor to 4-H& FFA, Director of the Florida Strawberry Growers Association, Florida Association of Food Banks	Hillsborough	2016
John L. Hoblick	president of Florida Farm Bureau; Hoblick Greens owner pesticide-free foliage and floral products	Volusia	2024
Elver "Doc" Hodges	agronomist UF Range Cattle Research & Education Center; developed new and improved cattle forage	Hardee	2014
Lena B. Smithers Hughes	improved citrus cultivars Hughes Nucellar Valencia bud line was 60% of Florida Valencias	Lake	1986
John L. Jackson	IFAS county extension agent; founded two weather alert systems; use reclaimed water for irrigation	Lake	2020
Lillie "Belle" Jeffords	Peanut producer and cattle rancher; agriculture promoter and member of dozens of civic organizations	Alachua	2006
Kenneth "Ken" F. Jorgensen	president of Zellwin Farms; president of the Florida Fruit & Vegetable Assn;	Orange	1999
Joseph C. Joyce	managed the invasive water hyacinth; IFAS oversight; Army Reserve Brigadier General;	Alachua	2016
Arlen Jumper	Citrus and timber manager; construction developer, sod producer; Florida Citrus Commission director	Marion	2003
Richard Kelly	agriculture teacher, leader of state FFA program, and adviser to Florida Agriculture Commissioner	Leon	2009
Billy Kempfer	beef cattle, Purebred Brahman & Angus cattle, timber management, sod and wildlife management through hunt club	Osceola	2016
Sam Killebrew, Sr.	patented bulk fertilizer hauler; designed liquid fertilizer spreaders, logging trailers, city refuse units and citrus high-lifts	Polk	2019
William "Bill" H. Krome	UF degree in agriculture donated 350 acres of avocados and tropical fruits to UF Tropical Research and Education Center	Miami-Dade	1997
Julian Lane	politician and dairyman, owned Lane Cattle Co. and Lane Citrus Co.	Hillsborough	1991
Louis E. "Red" Larson	Larson Dairy 3,000 cows, 10,000 acres in Okeechobee/Highlands Counties. USDA Dairy Advisory Committee	Okeechobee	1981
Louis Elwood "Woody" Larson, Jr	Lifelong dairyman and cattleman, chairman and board member of Farm Credit of Florida	Okeechobee	2026
W. Bernard Lester	Ph.D. in agricultural economics; executive director Florida Department of Citrus;	Polk	2017
Cary and Marcia Lightsey	cattle ranchers; conservation easements; mentoring Florida's youth; tours of their ranches and ecological sites	Polk	2025
Joseph Lowell Loadholtz	UF IFAS director; staged 100 agriculture informational legislative days in Tallahassee & Washington, D.C.	Brevard	2018
Edna Pearce Lockett	cattle rancher, an effective legislator	Highlands	1998
William Travis Loften	president Florida Vocational Association, supported ag education, teacher/educator	Pinellas	1993
Buster Longino	cattleman, a citrus grower, a forester, and a conservationist, served on dozens of environmental committees	Sarasota	2007
William D. "Billy" Long	Agriculture innovator mechanical corn-picking device; his "Gold Cup" sweet corn used on 85% of Florida farms	Orange	2005
Carl B. Loop Jr.	Loop's Nursery and Greenhouses; President of Duval Farm Bureau and Florida Farm Bureau	Duval	2002
Maxey D. Love, Jr	Farm banking and credit executive; National Commission on Agricultural Finance; National Council of Farmer Coops	Gilchrist	1998
Charles P. Lykes	president of Lykes Brothers agribusiness with cattle, citrus, farming, forestry, hunting, land and water resources	Pasco	1989
Paul Lyrene	Botanist and renowned blueberry plant breeder	Alachua	2011
Elliot L. Maguire	President Southern Forest Council; Florida Forestry Assn; St. Johns County Timber Growers Assn; modify Franklin skidder	Clay	1998
Latimer "Latt" Maxcy	citrus grove and processing, cattle, fertilizer. First president Florida Citrus Mutual	Polk	1995
Donald Farris May	tobacco farmer and horticulturist; developed irrigation systems, fertilizers, mechanization,& plant propagation	Gadsden	2004
Fountain "Fount" H. May, Sr.	300-acre container nursery; president Florida Nurserymen and Growers Association; promoter of horticulture worldwide	Gadsden	2001
Eugene (Gene) McAvoy	County Extension Agent; South Florida Pest and Disease Hotline; agricultural consultant	Hendry	2024
James Neville McArthur	principal Miami's Dade County Agricultural High School. McArthur Jersey Dairy Farms; J.N. McArthur Foundation	Miami-Dade	2006
Dan McClure	tomato grower who utilized research, automation and technology; County commissioner; active in ag organizations	Manatee	2010
Bobby McKown	CEO of the Florida Citrus Mutual voice of citrus industry, trade negotiator, problem solver and expert	Polk	2022
Madeline Mellinger	integrated pest management and sustainable systems; Glades Crop Care;	Palm Beach	2025
Harold Mikell	Florida Forest Service director & Florida Forester; congressional liaison for agriculture	Gilchrist	2018
Oma Richard "Dick" Minton Sr.	Citrus grower; president of Citrus Production Manager's Association; leader of DARE and SHARE	St. Lucie	2003
Gerald Mixon	Electrical engineer who became a citrus grower and cattle rancher, blueberry producer	Polk	2012
Wayne Mixson	Governor; telephones installed in rural areas and to eradicate hog cholera; chairman of the House Agriculture Committee	Leon	1996
Fred Y. Montsdeoca	Dixie Lime Products, Inc., and Montsdeoca Ranch, Inc.; worked with Seminole Tribe cattle	Marion	2004
Edwin L. Moore	perfected the method of producing frozen concentrated orange juice	Polk	1986
Robert Nelson Morris	Finance executive helped all phases of farming & ranching; founder of the Florida Agricultural Hall of Fame	Hillsborough	2004
John Mortensen	grape-related research produced development of grape varieties in Florida	Orange	1993
Julia Morton	botanist; created living encyclopedia of edible plants, research and fieldwork for the National Cancer Institute	Miami-Dade	1993
Copeland "Cope" Newbern	vocational ag teacher; multi-county agricultural agent; citrus grower/packer, a cattleman, melon & egg producer	Hernando	1999
Paul Nicoletti	veterinarian and epidemiologist with USDA and UF College of Veterinary Medicine, particularly cattle	Alachua	2013
Alan James Norden	developing the "Florunner" peanut variety grown on 90 percent of the peanut acreage in the Southeast since 1975		1984
Raymond P. Oglesby	Plant tissue culture researcher, developed disease-free banana plus avocado, pineapple, plantain & foliage plants.	Calhoun	1990
Joseph Orsenigo	research scientist and professor of plant physiology at UF; leader of research at Florida Sugar Cane League	Palm Beach	2011
Henry Oscar Partin	cattleman, introduced the Brahman breed to the state and was the founding father of the Florida Cattlemen's Association	Osceola	1980
J.O. Pearce, Jr	1950 president of the Florida Cattlemen's Association worked to eradicate cattle disease/pests	Okeechobee	1987
Curtis Peterson	registered landscape architect and nursey owner; Florida senate Agriculture Committee chairman	Polk	1992
Robert G. Pitman, Jr.	helped pass Florida Agricultural Assessment Law lowering property taxes on Ag property	Orange	1982
Hoyle Pounds	farm implement pioneer in the 1920's put rubber tires on a tractor	Orange	1980
Edgar H. Price	Senator, agriculture research, education, protection, politics; Florida Gladiolus Growers Assn manager	Manatee	1992
Dudley Adelbert Putnam	citrus grower and cattle rancher, long-distance trucking of citrus and citrus processing, Florida Farm Bureau leader	Polk	2006
Donald J. Quincey	Quincey Cattle Company, Florida Cattlemen's Association leader, Suwannee River Water Management District chair	Levy	2023
Egbert Norman Reasoner	world-famed horticulturist, introduced 1,000+ varieties of plants, trees, shrubs, vines and citrus including pink grapefruit	Manatee	1980
Pliny Ward Reasoner	1881 botanist Reasoner Nursery in Oneco introduced tropical plants	Manatee	1981
J. Wayne Reitz	UF President, Ag Professor, worked citrus at United Growers and Shippers Association	Alachua	1994
Herman J. Reitz	scientist, writer of Recommended Fertilizers and Nutritional Sprays for Citrus, UF Professor	Alachua	1982
Kay Richardson	cow-calf operations, cattle research, citrus groves, shared, allowed research on state-of-the-art, productive operation	Marion	2009
Martha Rhodes Roberts	34-year career with the Florida Department of Agriculture and Consumer Services	Alachua	2003
Robert Roberson	nursery operations for ornamental plants; creation of the UF/IFAS Mid-Florida Research and Education Center	Orange	2020
Bert Edward Roper	citrus grower; inventor of the Tree-See Control System electronic irrigation	Orange	2001
Anthony T. Rossi	founder of Tropicana Brands Group; invented/patented pasteurization for Orange juice; shipping OJ to NE	Manatee	1987
Carl G. Rose	established 30 Thoroughbred horse farms, improving pasture grasses, purebred cattle, helping FFA and 4-H clubs	Marion	1990
John O. Schlechter	farmer and Everglades Farm Equipment owner; member of civic and growers organizations	Palm Beach	2024
Mabel M. Simmons	first woman to operate a gladiola farm in Florida, largest flower producer in the state; president Florida Flower Assn	Hillsborough	1998
Charles Raymond "Chuck" Smith	county extension agent, County Commission, manager Hernando Egg Cooperative, State Representative	Hernando	2006
Jo Ann Doke Smith	first female president of the National Cattlemen's Association; served on dozens of committees to promote agriculture	Alachua	2005
Wayne Smith	groundbreaking educator, researcher, and administrator at UF College of Agricultural and Life Sciences	Alachua	2022
Mason Gabelein Smoak	cattle ranches, citrus groves and wildlife habitat, timber and horticulture; active in civic organizations and black bear research	Highlands	2009
George F. Sorn	Florida Fruit & Vegetable Association executive	Orange	2002
J.R. "Jack" Spratt	citrus groves, cattle ranches, forestry projects, mining operations and vegetable production.	Hendry	1997
Fritz Stein	cattle rancher and sugarcane grower; organized the Sugar Cane Growers Cooperative; advocate for farm workers	Palm Beach	2008
John Stitt	Rancher who pushed for creation of Southwest Florida Research and Education Center; worked with Florida Cattlemen's Association	Hendry	2022
Ron St. Johns	Dairyman from New York who founded Levy County Dairy and Alliance Dairy. Pioneered advanced dairy practices	Gilchrist	2027
Don A. Storms, Sr	"father" of vocational agriculture in Hillsborough County.1940's vo-ag teacher and supervisor	Hillsboro	1981
Alto Straughn	agricultural research, education, and commercial farming of watermelons and blueberries, beef cattle and timber	Alachua	2008
Jim Strickland	Cattle rancher; President Florida Cattlemen's Association; Chairman Florida Cattlemen's Foundation; conservation	Manatee	2025
Michael J. Stuart	president, Florida Fruit & Vegetable Association; leader on trade, labor and immigration in Tallahassee & Washington	Orange	2019
William H. Stuart, Sr.	citrus production, cattle breeding and the use of soil amendments & fertilizers to enhance native and improved pastures	Polk	1995
Sidney L. Sumner	beef producer, consultant, industry representative, Agriculture extension agent, supporter of youth agriculture programs	Polk	2012
Henry Frederick Swanson	Extension Service agent who helped preserve agriculture in Orange county during transition to world tourism destination	Orange	2000
Kenneth Ray Tefertiller	agricultural economist, teacher, university administrator and international consultant	Alachua	2003
Dallas Townsend	Cooperative Extension Agent, helped establish UF Immokalee Field Laboratory, SW Florida Research & Education Center	Hendry	2014
Eugene E. Trotter	professor and founder UF Wedgworth Leadership Institute for Agriculture; Institute of Food and Agricultural Sciences	Alachua	2013
Raymon F. Tucker	champion quarter horse breeder and cattleman; popularizing quarter horse racing in the Southeast	Flagler	1997
Gilbert Andrew Tucker	Florida baby beef promotion, beef importation, grading standards for beef	Brevard	1981
Latimer H. Turner	Sarasota Livestock Association, Florida Cattlemen's Association, supported Ag tax legislation	Sarasota	1994
John Thomas “Jack” Vogel	Member of the Florida Forestry Association (FFA) for nearly 40 years, industry icon and advocate for Florida silviculture	Pasco	2026
Vance V. Vogel	Ruskin Tomato Grower. Florida Fruit & Vegetable Association worked with migrant treatment	Hillsborough	1992
Donald Lee Wakeman	UF Professor livestock judge, livestock writer of scientific and popular journals, student scholarships	Alachua	1989
John Powell Wallace	first chairman of the American Egg Board; exporting chicks, hatching eggs and breeding stock; research cholesterol	Pinellas	1999
Alvin C. Warnick	Faculty member at UF Animal Science Department; improved beef cattle; authored book & papers; taught classes	Alachua	2015
James N. "Jim" Watson	forming the milk cooperative Upper Florida Milk Producers Association co-founder of the Greater Jacksonville Agricultural Fair	Duval	1982
Marshall O. Watkins	director of the Florida Cooperative Extension Service; involved with FFA & 4H	Alachua	1993
Dennis George Wedgworth	Farmer, rancher and fertilizer manufacturer	Palm Beach	2026
George H. Wedgworth	Florida Sugar Cane League and other trade and marketing associations, Everglades Research and Education	Palm Beach	1994
Ruth Springer Wedgworth	young widow organized the Florida Celery Exchange and charter member of the Sugar Cane Growers Cooperative	Palm Beach	1988
James S. Wershow	UF law (agriculture) professor; beef breeding farm; authored Greenbelt Law lowering property taxes on Ag property	Alachua	1987
Robert Blake Whisenant	Vegetable, citrus & tomato grower; Integrated Pest Management, Earthbox inventor; supported good working conditions	Manatee	2015
Robert "Bob" Billingsly Whisenant	civil engineer who designed floodgates beside saltwater, seepage irrigation in tomato fields, water wheel setting machine	Manatee	1997
Pat Wilson	cattle rancher and citrus grower; assisted FFA and 4-H, banker assisted other ag concerns	Polk	2015
Frank "Sonny" Williamson Jr.	citrus grower, rancher and aquaculturist; promoting responsible environmental stewardship	Okeechobee	2005
John T. Woeste	dean and professor emeritus UF Institute of Food and Agricultural Sciences; renewed Agricultural Law program	Alachua	2023
Ed and Imogene Yarborough	cattle ranchers, fenced large tracts, planted improved pastures, crossbreeding, conservation easement on their land	Seminole	2007
Stephen Monroe Yoder	soybeans, peanuts, corn, wheat, watermelons, rice, tomatoes, cotton, a cow/calf operation and Holstein dairy farm.	Calhoun	1997
E.T. York	UF Professor of agricultural science, founder of IFAS, fought global hunger	Alachua	1990

== See also ==
- Agricultural Hall of Fame
- List of agriculture awards
