= Juice Train =

Tropicana unit trains

Tropicana Juice Train
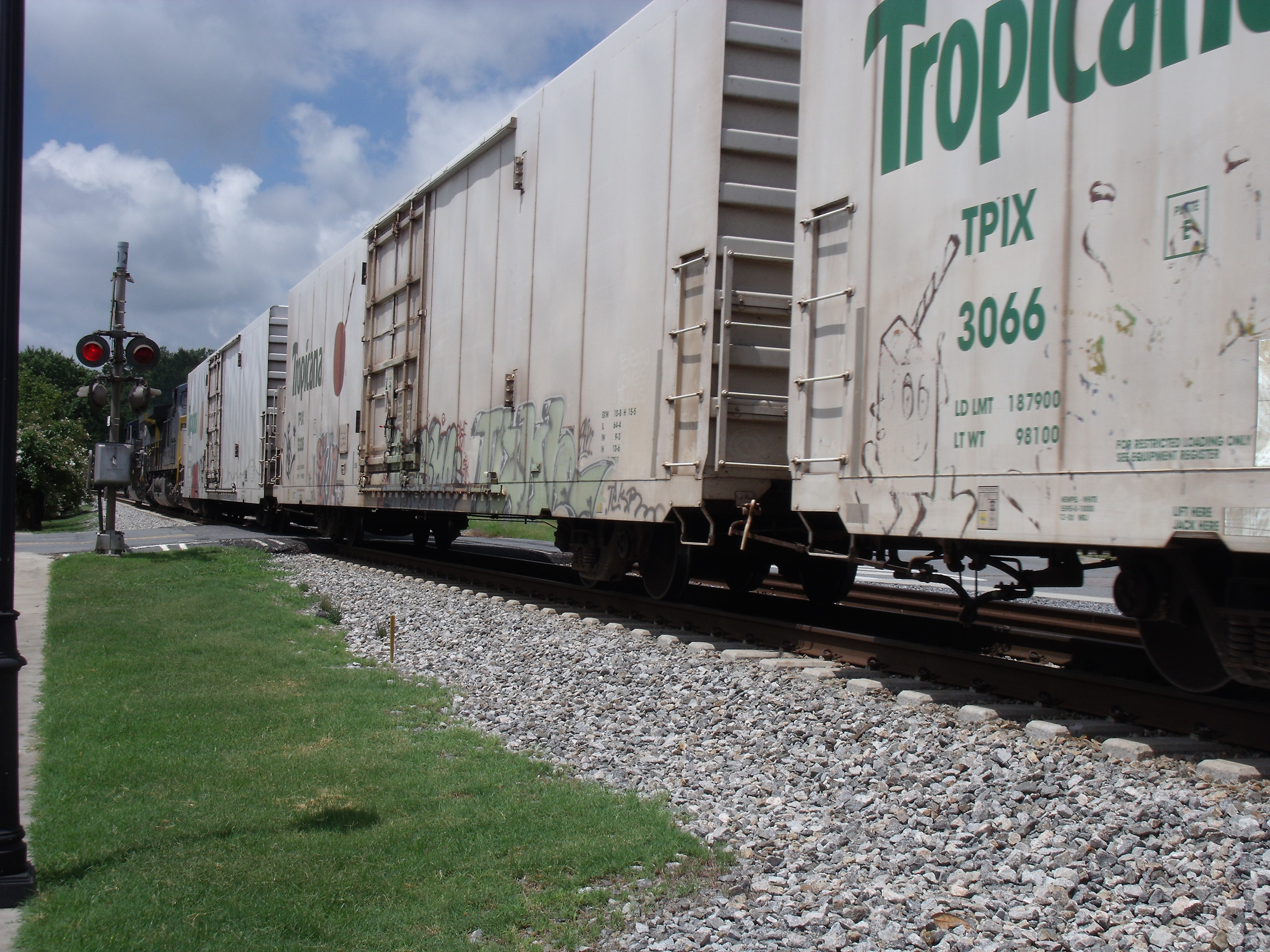
- Tropicana box-cars TPIX is under the logo of the nearest car.

Overview
- Owner: CSX

History
- Opened: 1970

Technical
- Track gauge: 1,435 mm (4 ft 8 1/2 in) standard gauge

"Juice Trains" (or "Orange Juice Trains") are the unit trains of Tropicana fresh orange juice operated by railroads in the United States.

== History ==
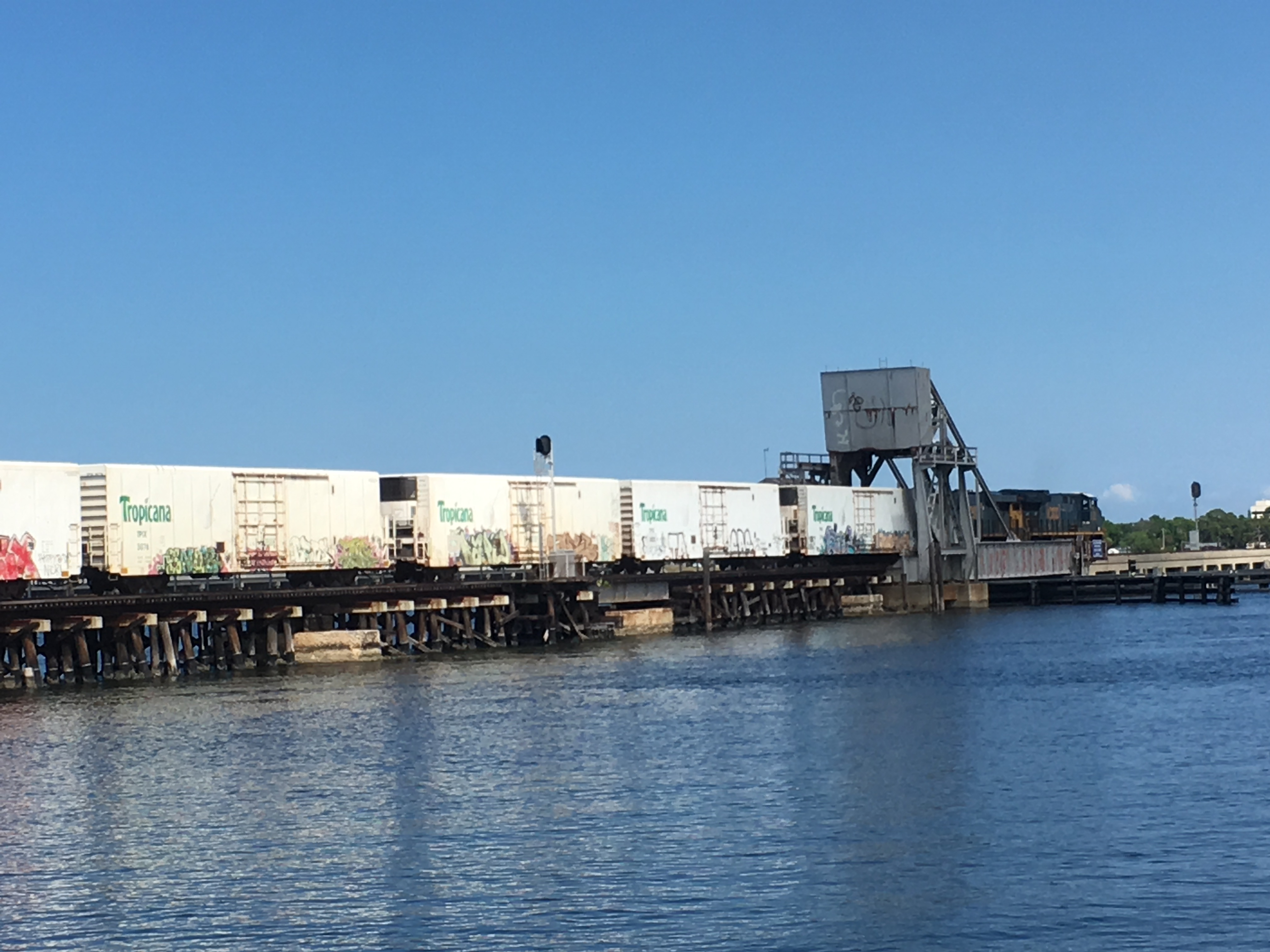
CSX pulling the Tropicana Juice Train across Manatee River near Bradenton Riverwalk in 2018

Tropicana Products was founded in 1947 in Bradenton, Florida by Anthony T. Rossi, an Italian immigrant, growing from 50 employees to over 3,000 in 2003. Early distribution of fresh orange juice was by way of hand-delivered juice jars to nearby homes, but demand grew, especially in the northeastern United States. By 1957, the ship, S.S. Tropicana, was used and delivered up to 1.5 million US gallons (5,700,000 L) of juice to New York for its weekly delivery. The ship's last voyage was in 1961 when transportation shifted to truck and rail transport.

In 1970, Tropicana orange juice was shipped in bulk via insulated boxcars in one weekly round-trip from Florida to Kearny, New Jersey. By the following year, the company was operating two 60-car unit trains a week, each carrying around 1 million US gallons (3,800,000 L) of juice. On June 7, 1971, the "Great White Juice Train," the first unit train in the food industry, commenced service over the 1,250 miles (2,010 km) route. The unit train consisted of 150 100-short-ton (89-long-ton; 91 t) insulated boxcars, fabricated in the Alexandria, Virginia shops of Fruit Growers Express. An additional 100 cars were incorporated into the fleet, and small mechanical refrigeration units were installed to keep temperatures consistent. Tropicana saved $40 million in fuel costs during the first ten years of its operation.

== Route and operations ==
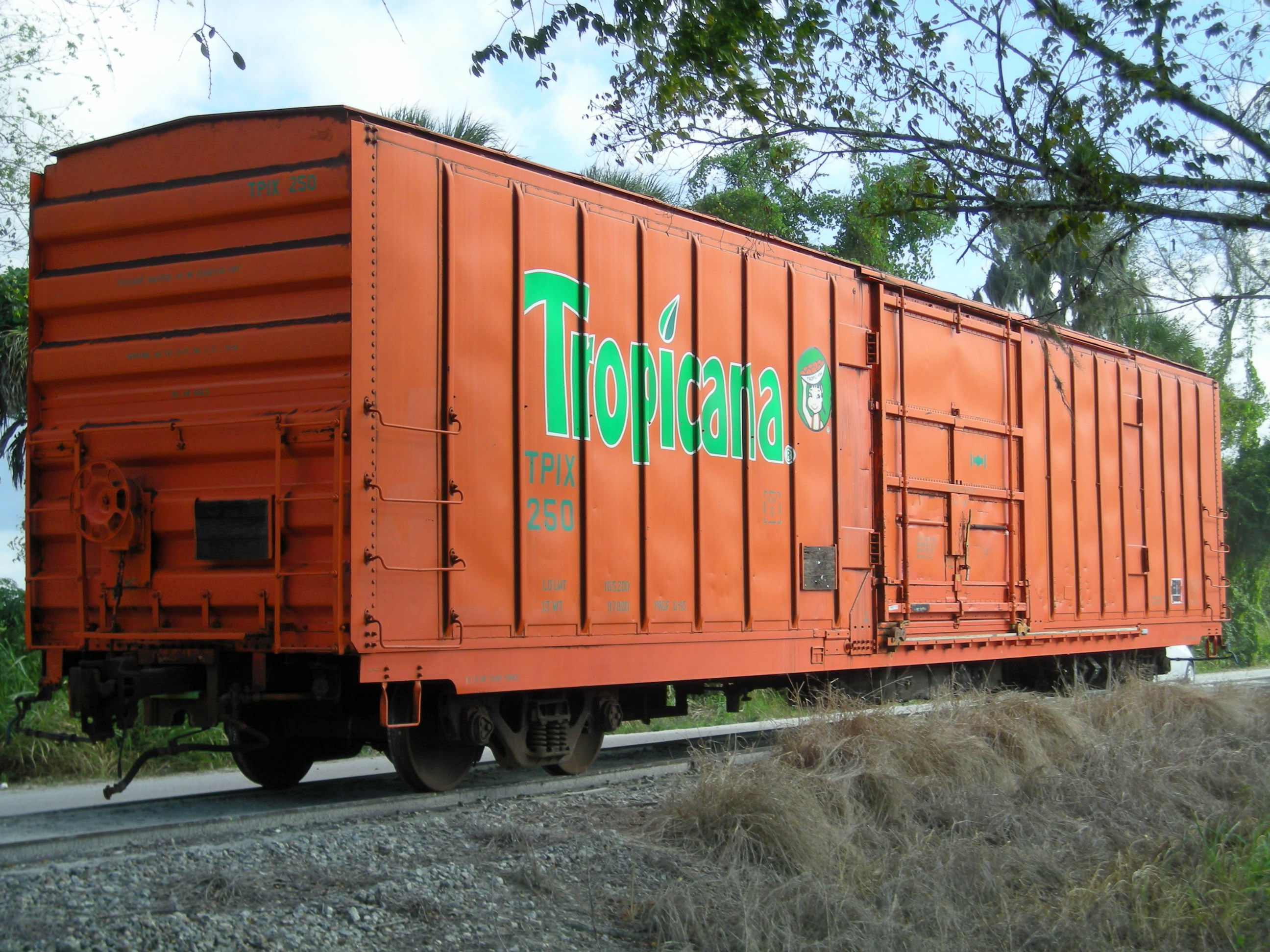
Former Tropicana refrigerated box car, donated to the Florida Gulf Coast Railroad Museum in Parrish, Florida.

Starting out on Seaboard Coast Line Railroad (SCL) south of Tampa, Florida, the original used former Seaboard Air Line Railroad (SAL) and Atlantic Coast Line Railroad (ACL) tracks. It crossed over to the Richmond, Fredericksburg and Potomac (RF&P) in Richmond, Virginia at pier 5 of the James River Bridge. At Potomac Yard, in Alexandria, Virginia, Penn Central Transportation (PC) took over and operated under the overhead wire with electric locomotives most of the way to Kearny, New Jersey.

There have been more than a few changes over the years. Tropicana became the world's leading producer of branded fruit juices. In 1976, Conrail (CR) took over from Penn Central, with electrification discontinued in 1981. SCL became part of CSX Corporation (CSX) in 1980, merging into Seaboard System Railroad (SBD) and then into CSX Transportation, which also included RF&P by 1991. In 1997, a second Juice Train began serving Cincinnati, Ohio. When CSX acquired part of Conrail in 1999, an all-CSX train began traveling to a larger facility in Jersey City, New Jersey on the National Docks Secondary.

Rolling stock also changed, including orange, white, and blue cars, some of which featured innovative refrigeration. Designated "TPIX" they are custom-built to Tropicana's specification. The Florida East Coast Railway (FEC) carries Tropicana cars from a second processing facility in Fort Pierce, Florida. The Juice Trains run ten trips each week to Jersey City and Cincinnati. Additional shipments in specially equipped refrigerated cars currently travel 3,000 miles (4,800 km) by rail to California. Tropicana had its own GE 70-ton switcher locomotive, No. 98, to switch cars at the New Jersey destination.

In 2017, CSX abolished separate Juice Trains between Philadelphia and Tampa, Florida. Tropicana products are carried on other CSX trains to and from Florida. A separate train for Tropicana operates over the short distance north of Philadelphia.

=== Routes list ===
Route list
Route number	To	From
#1	Jersey City, New Jersey	Bradenton, Florida
#2	Cincinnati, Ohio	Bradenton, Florida
#3	City of Industry, California	Bradenton, Florida

== See also ==
- Agriculture in Florida
