= Cricket Wireless Amphitheater =

Cricket Wireless Amphitheater may refer to:

- Cricket Wireless Amphitheater, commonly known as Sandstone Amphitheater, in Bonner Springs, Kansas
- Cricket Wireless Amphitheater, now Talking Stick Resort Amphitheatre in Phoenix, Arizona
- Cricket Wireless Amphitheatre, now North Island Credit Union Amphitheatre in Chula Vista, California
