= Ed Price (Florida politician) =

American politician (1918–2012)

- former Florida Senator Ed Price
- Born: January 1, 1918; Jacksonville, Florida, US
- Died: December 1, 2012 (aged 94); Bradenton, Florida, US
- Education: University of Florida
- Occupations: Pilot, Legislator, Citrus Executive, Community leader
- Political party: Democrat
- Spouse: Elise Ingram (1947–2009)
- Children: 1

Edgar Hilleary Price, Jr., (January 1, 1918 – December 1, 2012), was a World War II Bomber pilot, Florida legislator, community leader and agricultural manager who fought for civil rights and public education.

== Biography ==
=== Early life ===
Price was born in Jacksonville, Florida, but his farming family moved to Louisiana, Texas and New York before returning and settling in Florida. He graduated from Sarasota High School in 1936 where he was an outstanding athlete in football, basketball and tennis. He was also student body president. He continued his education at the University of Florida.

=== World War II ===
He enlisted in the Army nearly a year before the United States formally entered World War II. His first year was spent in the Medical Corps. After taking a competitive exam, he was selected for United States Army Air Corps training. He was commissioned as a pilot in 1943 and trained Boeing B-17 Flying Fortress crews. After deploying across the Atlantic Ocean, Price and his nine member crew flew 26 missions during 1945. His plane was part of the 381st Bomber Group stationed at Ridgewell Air Base in Essex, England. The Eighth Air Force flew daylight raids on Germany from 1943 to 1945 and suffered the highest casualty rates of the war. His war experiences shaped the rest of his life.

=== Marriage and children ===
Price married the former Elise Ingram on May 24, 1947 and the union produced one son, Jerald Stevens Price. Their wedding took place in the First Baptist Church of Bradenton where they were lifetime members. They both served as Sunday school teachers and Ed was twice chairman of the board of deacons. During the last 18 months of Elise's life, he took care of her 24/7. The marriage lasted for over 62 years until Elise's death on July 22, 2009.

=== Agriculture ===
After the war, Price managed a 400-acre commercial flower farm before being hired by Anthony T. Rossi as executive vice president and director of Tropicana Products in 1955. During his years with Tropicana, he ventured into politics and served on the Florida Citrus Commission. He resigned from Tropicana in 1972 to start the Price Company, a nonprofit consulting firm in Bradenton, but remained on the Tropicana board of directors until 1983. He retired from his own company in 2001.

=== Politics ===
Price was appointed by the governor to the Florida Board of Control, the governing body for the State University System of Florida. He subsequently campaigned for and was elected as state senator from the 36th District of Florida in 1958 and re-elected in 1962. He was appointed chairman of the senate higher education committee and a member of the senate appropriations committee where he played a key role in developing Manatee Junior College. MJC was located in his home district, and for many years he assisted minority/low income students to enroll there. While serving on the board of directors at a local financial institution, he discovered that certain neighborhoods were redlined. Price threatened to resign unless the policy was abolished. He was chairman of the 1963-65 Special Commission for the Study of the Abolition of the Death Penalty and served on many corporate and governmental boards. As the end of his second senate term approached, supporters encouraged him to run for governor. Reubin Askew, Florida Governor from 1971 to 1979 stated, "I even volunteered to be his lieutenant governor, but he placed his wife and family first." Price declined to seek any office, intending to focus on his job at Tropicana. Askew also said, "He was one of the closest friends I've ever had. He was also, I might add, one of the warmest, nicest human beings I have ever known. I had enormous personal respect for him."

=== Civic participation ===
In 1971 Price was asked to chair the Florida Citrus Commission by Governor Askew, and spent two years eliminating politics from the agency. He was named to the Florida Agricultural Hall of Fame in 1992 and the Manatee Agricultural Hall of Fame. He was a former board chairman of the Manatee County School District, past president of both the Manatee Chamber of Commerce and the Florida Chamber of Commerce, and chaired the Advisory Committee for Selection of the Chancellor for the Florida Board of Regents.

The Tampa Bay Times identified Price as one of "Florida's 10 most powerful people" in 1977.

== Awards ==
The Edgar H. Price Humanitarian Award is presented annually by the Palmetto Youth Center. The Manatee County Rural Health Services Foundation honored Price in 2006 with the first Edgar H. Price Jr. Lifetime Achievement Award, and each year names a worthy individual to receive it. A Statesmanship in Human Affairs Award was created by the Manatee County Branch of the NAACP to honor Ed Price.
