= National Agricultural Center and Hall of Fame =

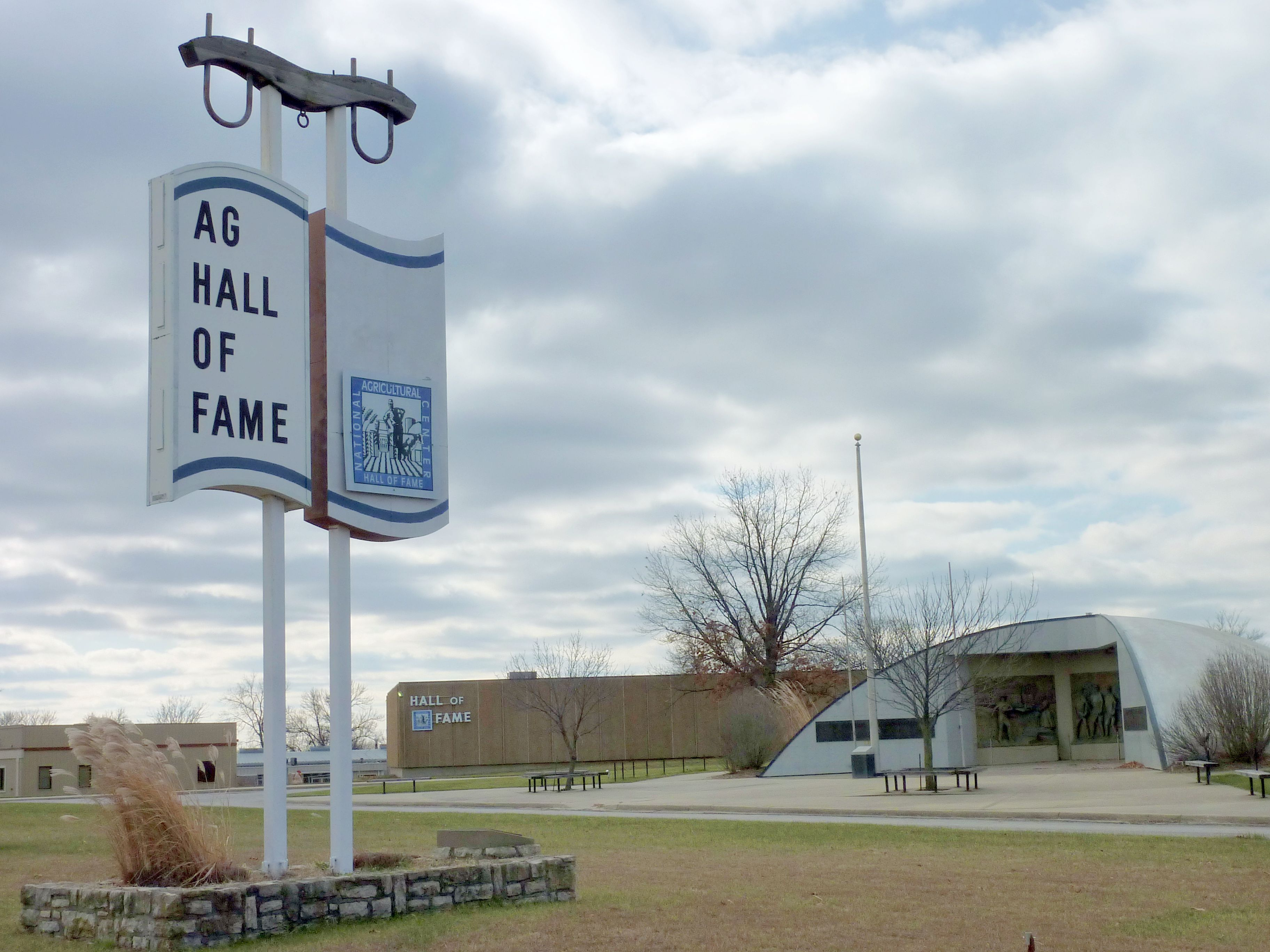
- The Hall in 2009
- Location: 630 Hall of Fame Drive; Bonner Springs, KS 66012; United States
- Coordinates: 39°06′36″N 94°52′21″W
- Type: Ag Museum
- Visitors: 20,000 / year
- Website: aghalloffame.com

The National Agricultural Center and Hall of Fame is a museum and educational facility in Bonner Springs, Kansas, United States. The group holds a congressional charter under Title 36 of the United States Code (issued in 1960). It is located east of K-7 and south of State Avenue (US-24, near 126th Street) next to the Sandstone Amphitheater and Kansas City Renaissance Festival. It is north of the Kansas Turnpike "Bonner Springs" exit, and about one mile (1.6 km) west of the Kansas Speedway.

== Components ==
=== Main Building ===
The Main Building built in 1963-64 includes:

- Gallery of Rural Art
- National Agricultural Hall of Fame
- Hall of Rural Living
- National Farm Broadcasters Hall of Fame
- Rural Electric Conference Theater
- National Farmer's Memorial
- National Poultry Museum

=== Museum of Farming ===
The 20,400-square-foot (1,900 m^{2}) building opened in 1967. Much of the museum's 30,000 artifacts, including an extensive collection of farm implements, are housed there.

=== Farm Town, U.S.A. ===
This recreation a rural village which opened in 1968 includes:

- Blacksmith Shop
- School House
- General Store
- Poultry Hatchery
- Railroad Depot
- Union Pacific Caboose
- Operational narrow-gauge train
- Farm House
- Farm Shed
- Chicken Coop
- Eight-sided Wooden Silo
- 75-seat outdoor Pavilion
- Smith Event Barn

== See also ==
- Agricultural Research Service Science Hall of Fame
- Freedom's Frontier National Heritage Area
- Fort Scott National Historic Site, Frontier Military Road destination
