= Tropicana Brands Group =

Fruit juice and soft drink maker

- Flat version of the Tropicana logo as of 2007
- Formerly: Tropicana Products, Inc. (until 2021)
- Type: Private
- Founded: 1947; 79 years ago
- Founder: Anthony T. Rossi
- Headquarters: Chicago, Illinois, US
- Products: Fruit juice
- Parent: PAI Partners (61%); PepsiCo (39%)
- Website: tropicana.com

Tropicana Brands Group (/ˌtrɒpɪˈkænə/ TROP-ih-KAN-ə) is an American fruit-based beverage company. It was founded in 1947 by Anthony T. Rossi in Bradenton, Florida. The company was a subsidiary of PepsiCo from 1998 to 2021. In August 2021, 61% of Tropicana was sold with the rest of PepsiCo's juice brand portfolio for $3.3 billion to French investment fund PAI Partners. PepsiCo retained the remaining 39% of the company's ownership.

== History ==
=== Establishment ===
Tropicana traces its roots to Anthony T. Rossi, a native of Sicily in Italy, who immigrated to the United States in 1921 at the age of 21. He drove a taxi, was a grocer in New York, and then worked as a farmer in Virginia. He then moved to Florida in 1940, where he farmed and operated a restaurant. His first involvement with the Florida citrus industry was creating fresh fruit gift boxes. These were sold in Macy's and Gimbels department stores, in the city of New York.

In 1947, Rossi settled in Palmetto, Florida (north of Bradenton, Florida) and began packing fruit gift boxes and jars of sectioned fruit for salads under the name Manatee River Packing Company. As the fruit segment business grew, the company moved to a larger location in East Bradenton, Florida, and changed its name to Fruit Industries. Fruit Industries continued to grow, and started supplying ingredients for fresh fruit salads on the menu of New York's famed Waldorf-Astoria Hotel. Rossi began producing frozen concentrated orange juice at the East Bradenton location as a natural extension of the fruit section business.

=== Evolution ===
In 1952, Rossi purchased the Grapefruit Canning Company in Bradenton. The fresh fruit segments and orange juice business was profitable enough that he discontinued the production of fruit boxes. He developed flash pasteurization in 1954, a preservation process that raised the temperature of juice for a short time to minimally affect its taste. It provided an alternative to the frozen product, which both heated and concentrated the juice. Tropicana Pure Premium chilled juice became the company's flagship product.

The company developed a trademarked cartoon mascot for the brand called Tropic-Ana, a barefoot young girl carrying oranges on her head and wearing clothing that resembles a Hawaiian grass skirt and lei. She appeared prominently on the juice cartons and train cars used to transport the juice. Her image was phased out during the 1980s.

Ed Price was hired as executive vice president and director in 1955 and represented the company as chairman of the Florida Citrus Commission. In 1957, the company's name was changed to Tropicana Products, Inc. to reflect the growing appeal of the Tropicana brand.

=== Shipping innovations ===
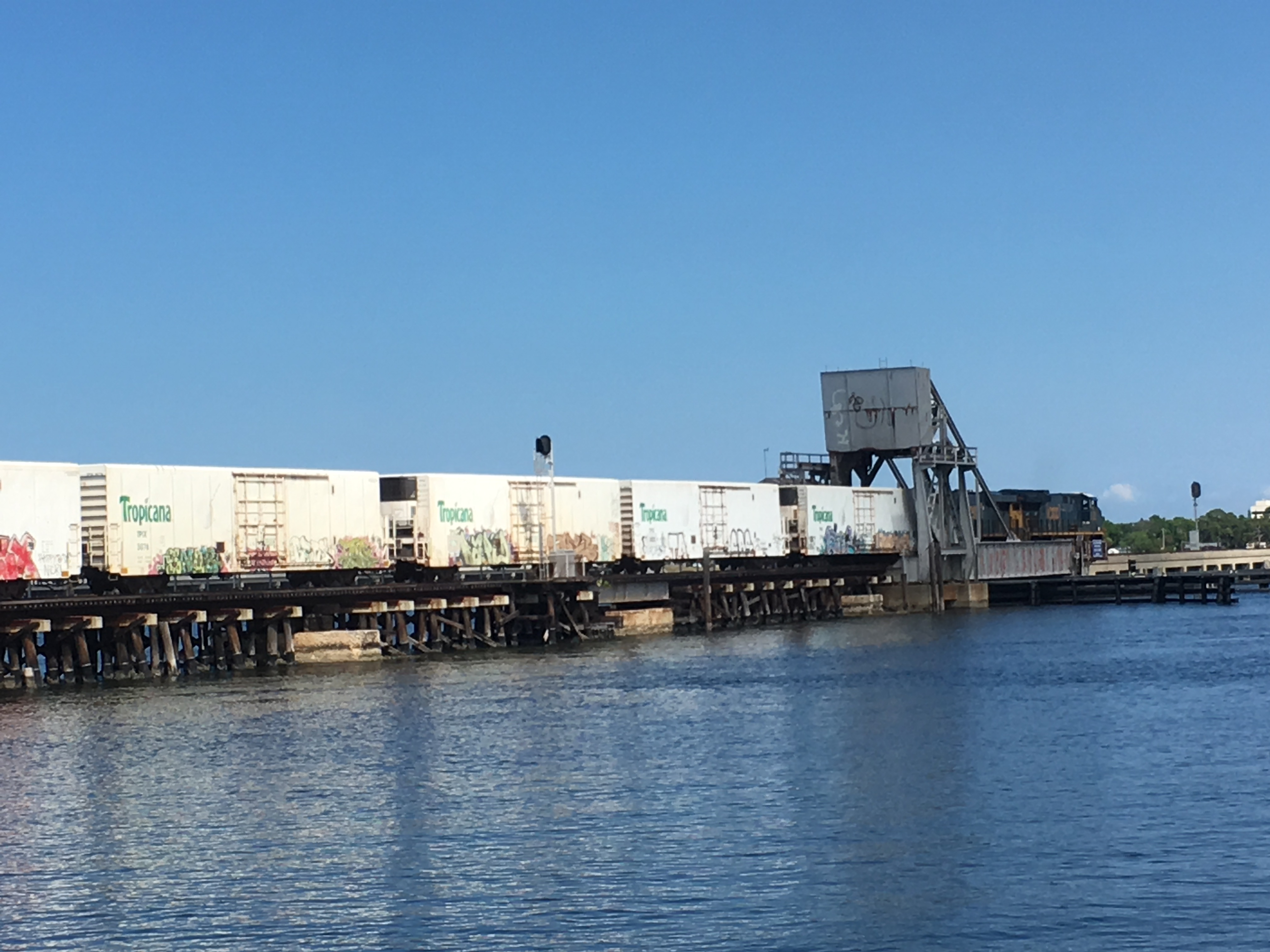
CSX pulling the Tropicana Juice Train across the Manatee River Bridge in Bradenton, Florida, in 2018

Tropicana purchased one million dollars' worth of refrigerated trucks to deliver Pure Premium in the mid to late fifties. Soon, 2,000 dairies delivered Pure Premium orange juice to the doorsteps of consumers each morning. By 1958, a ship, S.S. Tropicana, delivered 1.5 million US gallons (1,200,000 imp gal; 5,700 m^{3}) of juice to New York each week from the new base at Cape Canaveral, Florida. From 1960 to 1970, Tropicana utilized piggyback trailers on flatcars to move the juice more efficiently.

In 1970, Tropicana orange juice was shipped as finished goods via refrigerated boxcars in one weekly round-trip from Florida to Kearny, New Jersey. By the following year, the company was operating two 65-car unit trains a week, each carrying around 1 million US gallons (830,000 imp gal; 3,800 m^{3}) of juice. The "Great White Juice Train" (the first unit train in the food industry, consisting of 150 100-short ton insulated boxcars fabricated in the Alexandria, Virginia shops of Fruit Growers Express) commenced service on June 7, 1971, over the 1,250-mile (2,010 km) route. An additional 100 cars were soon incorporated into the fleet, and small mechanical refrigeration units were installed to keep temperatures constant on hot days. In 2004, Tropicana's rail fleet of 514 cars traveled over 35,000,000 mi (56,000,000 km) – a method that is three times more fuel-efficient than other shipping methods.

=== Going public and expansion (1969–1997) ===
Tropicana Products, Inc. went public in 1969. The stock was first sold over the counter but later listed on the New York Stock Exchange under the symbol TOJ. In the same year, it became the first company in the citrus industry to operate its own plastic container manufacturing plant.

Executive vice president Ed Price, who served two terms in the Florida Senate (1958–1966), resigned his position in 1972, but remained on the board of directors until 1983.

Rossi sold Tropicana to Beatrice Foods in 1978. He then retired and was inducted into the Florida Agricultural Hall of Fame in 1987. In 1985, Tropicana debuted Tropicana Pure Premium HomeStyle orange juice, which featured added pulp.

In 1988, Tropicana was acquired by Canadian beverage conglomerate Seagram for $1.2 billion. In the decade that followed, it introduced new juice beverage creations, including the orange line of bottled and frozen juice blends.

In the early nineties, under Seagram, Tropicana also began expanding its distribution into global markets. They formed a partnership to process and distribute Kirin-Tropicana juices in Japan. By that time, the company was also distributing Tropicana Pure Premium in Canada, the United Kingdom, Ireland, France, Germany, Argentina, Panama, and Sweden. As the 1990s continued, Tropicana further expanded internationally, entering several more Latin American countries, Hong Kong and China.

Seagram Beverage Group acquired Dole Food Company's global juice business in 1995, including the Dole brands in North America, and Dole, Fruvita, Looza, and Juice Bowl juices and nectars in Europe. Dole was operated under Tropicana Dole Beverages North America and Tropicana Dole Beverages International.

=== Sold to PepsiCo and 21st century (1998–2021) ===
- Tropicana's logo through the years:
- 2003–2007 and 2007–2017

Tropicana was acquired by PepsiCo in 1998 for $3.3 billion, which combined it with the Dole brand for marketing purposes. The company has become the world's leading producer of branded fruit juices. Tropicana headquarters moved to Chicago in 2003.

Due to the decreased productivity of Florida's orange crop in the wake of several damaging touches of frost, Tropicana began using a blend of Florida and Brazilian oranges in 2007. Citing an increased consumer interest in the origin of food products, the company announced in February 2012 that its Tropicana Pure Premium line would return to sourcing oranges only from Florida. Tropicana later reverted to sourcing its oranges from both Florida and Brazil due to the Asian citrus psyllid, a microscopic insect that spreads a bacterial disease that causes citrus greening. It is estimated that the disease has killed over 75% of Florida's citrus trees.

In February 2009, Tropicana switched the design on all cartons sold in the United States to a new image created by the Arnell Group. The new packaging featured an image of a stemmed glass of orange juice, redesigned the cap to resemble an orange's exterior, and rotated the name for vertical reading. After two months of negative consumer reaction and a 20% drop in sales, Tropicana switched back to its original design of an orange skewered by a drinking straw.

In early 2010, Tropicana reduced the size of its traditional cartons from 64 to 59 US fl oz (1.89 to 1.74 L) in the U.S. market and maintained the original price. This change represented a 7.8% increase in the price per ounce for consumers. In 2018, Tropicana again reduced the size of its containers, from 59 to 52 US fl oz (1.74 to 1.54 L), with Tropicana's website stating it was due to a raise in commodity prices from orange crop yields declining due to natural events and Hurricane Irma.

=== Joint venture with PAI Partners (2021–present) ===
On August 3, 2021, PepsiCo announced that they would sell a majority stake in Tropicana, Naked Juice, and other juice brands to PAI Partners for $3.3 billion, to concentrate on their healthy snack foods and zero-calorie beverages. They would retain a 39% stake in the new joint-venture company and have exclusive distribution rights to the brands in the USA.

In November 2024, Tropicana announced it was redesigning its packaging, reducing the size of its orange juice containers. The company will replace the 52-ounce carafe with a narrower 46-ounce bottle. This change comes amid declining orange juice consumption in the United States.

In February 2025, Tropicana reported that it was in financial distress and warned it may file for Chapter 11 bankruptcy protection. The company blamed several factors for its struggles, including declining sales, inflation, changes in Americans' diets, increased competition, and natural disasters in Florida and Brazil driven by climate change. The latter reason, in particular, caused production to be shed by over 73% since 2015.

== Not-for-profit affiliations ==
In 2008, Tropicana started the "Rescue Rainforest" campaign in the U.S. in collaboration with the charity Cool Earth. People could buy special promotional packs of Tropicana and enter the pack's code online. For each code entered, 100 square feet (9.3 m^{2}) of rainforest would be saved. The project was based in the Ashaninka corridor in Peru, which lies in an arc of deforestation. As of June 2009, over 47,000,000 square feet (4,400,000 m^{2}; 4.4 km^{2}; 1.7 sq mi) had been saved.

Tropicana has also been encouraging carton recycling and supporting the Sustainable Forestry Initiative.

== Other products ==
Pepsi produced fruit-flavored soft drinks called Tropicana Twister Soda in 2005. This soft drink line replaced Pepsi's Slice line. Tropicana also has Fruit Snacks, and in the United Kingdom makes smoothies.

Trop50, introduced by Tropicana in 2009, is orange juice with 50% less sugar and calories, a reduction achieved by diluting with 50% water and adding Reb A or PureVia, chemically altered versions of the Stevia plant. Trop50 is available in several varieties including Farmstand Apple, Pomegranate Blueberry, Pineapple Mango, Orange, Lemonade, and Raspberry Lemonade.

A number of their juice products designed for an extended shelf life are colored with carmine, an extract of cochineal beetles.

In 2010, the company announced a limited release of Tropolis, a liquid fruit snack drink, for January 2011.

In celebration of National Orange Juice Day on May 4, 2022, Tropicana released Tropicana Crunch, a limited-edition cereal intended to be eaten with orange juice. Composed primarily of oats, wheat, brown sugar, rice, almonds, and honey.

== Naming rights ==
In October 1996, Tropicana bought a 30-year naming rights deal for the former Thunderdome stadium (Tropicana Field) in St. Petersburg, Florida.

The name of the Bradenton Juice baseball team of the South Coast League was indicative of Tropicana's headquarters which were located in Bradenton, Florida.

== Headquarters ==
The headquarters of Tropicana Products are in Chicago, Illinois. PepsiCo, the parent company of Tropicana, planned to begin moving Tropicana employees into its existing Chicago facility in the first quarter of 2004. PepsiCo moved Tropicana to Chicago to consolidate its juice brands into one Chicago-based unit.

Tropicana Products was then headquartered in a four-story building called the Rossi Office Building in Bradenton, Florida from 2002 to 2004. In 2007, the building was sold to Bealls of Florida. The 149,000 square foot building was renamed the E. R. Beall Center.

== See also ==
- Agriculture in Florida

== Sources ==
- Rossi's bio at the Florida Agriculture Hall of Fame class of 1987
- Sanna Barlow Rossi. (1986) Anthony T. Rossi, Christian and Entrepreneur: The Story of the Founder of Tropicana. Inter-Varsity Press. ISBN 0-8308-4999-8
