= Sandstone Amphitheater =

Open-air amphitheater in Bonner Springs, Kansas

- Interactive map of Sandstone Amphitheater
- Former names: Sandstone Center for the Performing Arts (1983–93); Sandstone Amphitheater (1993–2002, 2008); Verizon Wireless Amphitheater (2002–07); Capitol Federal Park at Sandstone (2008-12); Cricket Wireless Amphitheater (2012-15); Providence Medical Center Amphitheater (2016-21)
- Address: 633 North 130th Street; Bonner Springs, Kansas 66012
- Coordinates: 39.113796°N 94.876717°W
- Owner: The Unified Government
- Operator: New West Presentations
- Seating type: Reserved, box and lawn seating
- Capacity: 18,000
- Type: Amphitheatre

Construction
- Groundbreaking: 1984
- Opened: 1984
- Renovated: 2008, 2016

Website
- www.azuraamp.com

Sandstone Amphitheater, currently known as Azura Amphitheater, is an open-air amphitheater located in Bonner Springs, Kansas, United States. It is owned by the unified government of Wyandotte County and Kansas City, Kansas, shares its grounds with the Kansas City Renaissance Festival and National Agricultural Center and Hall of Fame and is located adjacent to the Wyandotte County Park.

== History ==
Designed by Bird Engineering, it originally opened in 1984, as the Sandstone Center for the Performing Arts. It was renamed 'Verizon Wireless Amphitheater' in June 2002, after Verizon Wireless bought the naming rights for seven years from Houston-based Clear Channel Entertainment for an undisclosed amount. Clear Channel Communications spun off its live events management division in 2005 to form Los Angeles-based Live Nation, which continued to manage the venue through the 2007 concert season. Locals simply refer to the venue as "Sandstone".

In September 2007, Live Nation announced that it would let its managing contract expire on December 31, 2007. In January 2008, the Unified Government Commission ratified a pact with local promoter Chris Fritz's New West Presentations, Inc., to operate the venue through the end of 2009, with a two-year option to extend the contract. Under the new deal with New West, the name would revert to Sandstone.

Through 2007, the venue featured 6,700 reserved seats and general admission lawn seating. Beginning in 2008, plans are underway to remove the majority of the reserved seats closest to the stage in order to make that area a general admission section. The change in the seating configuration is designed to let more fans get closer to the performers and eliminate costs of the extra security normally required. Additional structural changes include an upgraded VIP club and new sound and video systems. Through the years the stage has fought several limitations. For instance, a 37-foot roof is well below the norm, which often proves challenging to book shows.

=== Name ===
It has undergone numerous name changes since it opened:

- Sandstone Center for the Performing Arts (original name, 1983–1993)
- Sandstone Amphitheater (1993–2002, 2008)
- Verizon Wireless Amphitheater
- Capitol Federal Park at Sandstone
- Cricket Wireless Amphitheater
- Providence Medical Center Amphitheater (2016–2021)
- Azura Amphitheater (2021–present)

== See also ==
- List of contemporary amphitheatres
