= A. Duda & Sons =

Coordinates: 28.6519°N 81.2268°W

A. Duda & Sons refers to various agricultural and real estate developments, with ranches in Central Florida, Texas, and California.

The company grows vegetables, citrus, sugarcane, and other crops, and raises cattle. It is best known as one of the top growers of celery in the United States. It markets produce using the Dandy label.

It has significant land holdings in Florida, California and Texas. It has developed some of this land for residential and commercial use. The Viera Company subsidiary oversees the development and management of Viera, Florida, a planned community in Brevard County, Florida, which had 16,000 residents in 2007.

== Operations ==
Operations include vegetable and melon farming; orange groves; other citrus Groves; Nursery and Tree Production; Sugarcane Farming; Beef Cattle Ranching and Farming; Commercial and Institutional Building Construction; Land Subdivision; Sugar Manufacturing; Sugarcane Mills; Fresh Fruit and Vegetable Merchandising Wholesalers.

== History ==
Andrew Duda immigrated to United States from Slovakia. He started a celery farm in 1926 with 40 acres (16 ha).

With celery as the cash crop, Duda had around 2,500 acres (1,000 ha) in the 1940s. The family diversified into beef cattle ranching at their Cocoa Ranch, near Cocoa, Florida. By the 1970s, it had 20,000 cattle.

The business was incorporated in 1953.

The company revenues were $200 million in the 1980s. Ranch holdings in Central Florida had risen to 16,000 acres (6,500 ha).
