= Kansas City Renaissance Festival =

Annual renaissance fair in Kansas

Coordinates: 39°06′43″N 94°52′31″W

- Genre: Renaissance fair
- Dates: Labor Day Weekend to October
- Locations: Bonner Springs, Kansas, United States
- Inaugurated: 1977
- Attendance: 200,000 (average)
- Area: 16 acres (6.5 ha)
- Stages: 20
- Website: kcrenfest.com

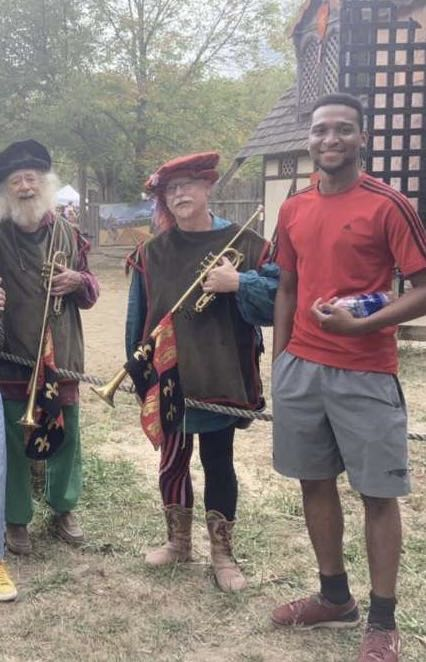
Kansas City Renaissance Festival, 2021

The Kansas City Renaissance Festival is a Renaissance fair held each fall in Bonner Springs, Kansas, United States, next to Sandstone Amphitheater. Each year the fair begins on Labor Day weekend and continues for seven weekends, open on Saturdays and Sundays as well as Labor Day and Columbus Day. The faire began in 1977 as a benefit for the Kansas City Art Institute and became a stand-alone event in the late 1990s. Presently, the fair has 165 booths and 13 stages, entertaining 200,000 patrons annually on 16 operating days.

In keeping with its artistic beginnings, KCRF features over 150 shops and vendors, many of which sell original crafts and artwork. The site itself is artistic, featuring winding tree-lined lanes, painted murals, and banner-strewn, fancifully decorated buildings. In particular, the Institute for Historic and Educational Arts (IHEA) maintains a large presence. Its artisans demonstrate a variety of textile, wood and metal crafting techniques, even operating a fully functional blacksmith shop. KCRF offers a free Living History Tour in which patrons can view some of these craftspeople at work as well as hear presentations by costumed characters about Renaissance art, science, medicine, and warfare.

== History ==
The festival began in 1977 as a much smaller festival. For its first 23 seasons, it was operated primarily as a benefit for the Kansas City Art Institute rather than as a business. In 1999, it was purchased by Mid-America Festivals, which also operates the Minnesota Renaissance Festival, and turned into a much larger business concern.

The Kansas City Renaissance Festival, in addition to being sold to new ownership in the late 1990s and the tremendous growth it has encountered, has also faced the extreme possibility of having to shut down and move in the early part of the 21st century. There was talk in 2003 during a lease fight with Wyandotte County, Kansas, a scenario in which the festival ownership and management gave serious thought to relocating the festival and taking every structure and sign with them. Ultimately, the lease fight was resolved with Mid-America Festivals signing a new long-term lease and agreeing to keep the festival open in Bonner Springs for what they heralded at the time as "another thirty years."

The COVID-19 pandemic caused the 2020 season to be cancelled.

== See also ==
- List of Renaissance fairs
- Historical reenactment
- Jousting
- Society for Creative Anachronism
- List of open air and living history museums in the United States
