= Nonprofit consulting firm =

A nonprofit consulting firm is a professional service organization that specializes in providing strategic guidance, capacity building, and other management services to nonprofit organizations. It aims to help nonprofits address challenges, optimize resources, and achieve their mission more effectively. The primary goal of nonprofit consulting firms is to help organizations improve their operational efficiency, increase their impact, and better serve their target communities.

== History ==
Nonprofit consulting firms emerged in response to the growing need for specialized management support and strategic guidance within the nonprofit sector. As nonprofit organizations began to face more complex challenges, including increased competition for funding, evolving social issues, and expanding regulatory requirements, they sought the expertise of consultants who understood their unique needs and constraints.

Notable nonprofit consulting firms include The Bridgespan Group, an American nonprofit consulting firm based in Boston that works with mission-driven organizations and philanthropists.
