= Anthony T. Rossi =

Founder of Tropicana Products

- Born: Antonio Talamo Rossi; September 13, 1900; Messina, Sicily, Italy
- Died: January 24, 1993 (aged 92); Bradenton, Florida, U.S.
- Resting place: Manasota Memorial Cemetery
- Known for: Founder of Tropicana; Orange juice pasteurization
- Spouse(s): Florence Lillian Starke (died 1952) Sanna Barlow Morrison (m. 1959; died 2007)

Anthony Talamo Rossi (September 13, 1900 – January 24, 1993) was an Italian-born American who founded Tropicana Products, a producer of orange juice, in 1947 in Bradenton, Florida. It grew from 50 employees to over 8,000 in 2004, expanding into multiple product lines and becoming one of the world's largest producers and marketers of citrus juice.

Rossi was an early pioneer in including Florida's citrus juices in school meal programs. He also became a noted religiously-oriented businessman, making annual pilgrimages back to Sicily where he helped build a church and mission. In the U.S., he married Sana Barlow and endowed the Aurora Foundation, which has funded various Christian programs.

== Early life ==
Rossi was born on September 13, 1900, in Messina, Sicily. He graduated from high school and emigrated to the United States when he was 21. Rossi originally started as a machinist's assistant and later worked as a taxi driver. From there, he created a limousine company and was a grocer at some point in New York City. He also worked as a farmer in Virginia and Florida, the latter which he moved to in 1940. In Florida, he was a restaurateur too.

In 1945, Rossi settled in Palmetto, Florida. In this city, he founded Manatee River Packing Company, where he shipped packaged gift fruit. He also began sectioning citrus fruit like grapefruit into jars and selling them mainly to the Waldorf Astoria in New York. In 1949, Rossi moved the business from Palmetto to Bradenton and changed the name to Fruit Industries, Inc. There, Rossi produced frozen concentrate orange juice.

== Tropicana ==
In 1946, Rossi founded a small orange juice company in western Florida and thus began the Tropicana Products company. Tropicana's early distribution of fresh orange juice was by way of hand-delivered juice jars to nearby homes, but demand grew, especially in New York City.

A major breakthrough came in 1954, when Rossi invented and patented a pasteurization process to aseptically pack pure chilled juice in glass bottles, allowing it to be shipped and stored without refrigeration. He provided consumers the fresh taste of orange juice made from 100-percent fruit. Soon thereafter, he also devised a method of freezing pure whole citrus juice in 20-US-gallon (76 L) blocks for storage and shipping. By 1957, a ship, S.S. Tropicana was taking up to 1.5 million US gallons (5,700 m^{3}) of juice to New York each week.

In 1970, Tropicana orange juice was shipped in bulk via insulated boxcars in one weekly round-trip from Florida to Kearny, New Jersey. By the following year, the company was operating two 60-car unit trains a week, each carrying around 1 million US gallons (3,800 m^{3}) of juice.

In 1978, Rossi retired and sold Tropicana to Beatrice Foods. Tropicana has been through a number of corporate changes and since 1998, it has operated as a division of Tropicana Brands Group.

== Personal life ==
His first wife, Florence Lillian Starke, was the daughter of a Methodist minister. She died in 1952.

On December 1, 1959, Rossi married his second wife, Sanna Barlow Morrison.

== Christianity ==
Rossi grew up Catholic. He had experienced an earthquake in his home town of Messina, Italy and it spurred him to seek information about God, Judgment Day and Heaven. After some time in America and experience with business, Rossi sold his large grocery store in preparation to move to the south to take up farming, around which time he began reading the Bible.

He and his first wife (Florence) joined the First Methodist Church in Florida in 1941. He and his wife joined Calvary Baptist in Bradenton Florida in 1965. He traveled back home to Italy annually from 1952, and in 1966 he helped to fund a church and mission there.

Rossi established the Aurora Foundation in the 1960s, which has funded Christian educational institutions, missions, and other charities.

== Legacy ==
Rossi was inducted into the Florida Agricultural Hall of Fame in 1987. In addition to his work with product development at Tropicana, his efforts to introduce citrus products into school food programs have also been lauded.
