= KDTD =

Radio station in Kansas City, Kansas

- Kansas City, Kansas; United States
- Broadcast area: Kansas City metropolitan area
- Frequency: 1340 kHz
- Branding: La Grande 1340 AM

Programming
- Format: Mexican Regional music

Ownership
- Owner: Edward Reyes; (Reyes Media Group, Inc.)
- Sister stations: KCZZ

History
- First air date: 1925
- Former call signs: WLBF (1925–1936); KCKN (1936–1982); KRKR (1982); KFKF (1982–1985); KCKM (1985–1987); KFKF (1987–1990); KNHN (1990–1997); KFEZ (1997–2000); KCKN (2000–2005)
- Former frequencies: 1420 kHz (1927); 1430 kHz (1927–1928); 1200 kHz (1928); 1420 kHz (1928–1936); 1310 kHz (1936–1941)

Technical information
- Licensing authority: FCC
- Facility ID: 33697
- Class: C
- Power: 1,000 watts unlimited 200 watts (experimental synchronous operation)
- Transmitter coordinates: 39°6′50″N 94°40′45″W; 38°16′1″N 94°30′59″W (experimental synchronous operation)

Links
- Public license information: Public file; LMS
- Webcast: Listen Live
- Website: www.lagrand1340kc.com

KDTD (1340 AM) is a radio station broadcasting a Mexican Regional music format. Licensed to Kansas City, Kansas, United States and serving the Kansas City metropolitan area, the station is currently owned by Edward Reyes, through licensee Reyes Media Group, Inc. The station's studios are located on South 55th Street in Kansas City, Kansas; and its transmitter is located on Ann Avenue behind the Midway Shopping Center.

== History ==
=== Establishment as WLBF ===
Entrepreneur and businessman Everett L. Dillard is the individual credited with putting the station on the air as WLBF. Dillard began broadcasting from his personal residence, with the original studio and transmitter being built at 32nd and Main streets in Kansas City, Missouri. The station moved across the river in 1928, when it began to occupy the 11th floor of the Elks Lodge Building (905 North 7th Street) in downtown Kansas City, Kansas. The building was last known as the Huron Building and was demolished in 1999. Like many early stations, WLBF moved around the dial in its early years; it started on 1420 kHz and relocated to 1430, where it broadcast with just 50 watts. In September 1928, it was allowed to move to 1200 kHz with 100 watts, only for a massive national radio reallocation (General Order 40) to send the station back to 1420 on November 11.

Dillard went bankrupt in the Great Depression, and in 1930, the station was placed into receivership. That June, the station was sold to Alexander Maitland and Herbert Hollister, doing business as the WLBF Broadcasting Company.

=== KCKN ===
==== Sale to Arthur Capper ====
On November 13, 1935, the station was sold to Kansas U.S. Senator Arthur A. Capper who also owned the Kansas City Kansan daily newspaper. Capper's other related properties were the Topeka Daily Capital, the Topeka State Journal and WIBW, all in Topeka. Capper purchased the radio station to promote the Kansan and to give him a piece of the growing Greater Kansas City advertising market. When Capper acquired the property, it operated at 1420 kHz.

The Capper organization moved the station one block west into the offices of the Kansan at 901 North 8th Street. A new, self-supporting 186-foot box-tower was erected atop the three-story building. While the call letters were officially changed on October 20, 1936, it was not until Thanksgiving Day, November 26, that the station formally made the change to KCKN, which was derived from the letters in the name of the newspaper and the initials of its city of license, and another change, a relocation to 1310 kHz that was approved earlier in the year and reduced interference.

In 1939, KCKN was authorized to increase its power to 250 watts. It was on the air daily between 7 a.m. and 9 p.m. The newspaper reported the station could be heard up to 300 miles away from Kansas City, Kansas, with the new broadcast equipment and a higher tower. In 1941, under the North American Regional Broadcasting Agreement, KCKN was moved to 1340 kHz, the frequency on which the station still remains.

KCKN became national news in the November 24, 1941, edition of Time magazine, after it broadcast a weeklong serial reading of journalist Clarence Streit's famous book, Union Now. Time referred to author Streit as a "level-headed zealot" for advocacy of the immediate federal union of the United States, England and other democratic states as a means of winning World War II. The consensus was that KCKN had broadcast the piece on orders from station owner and known isolationist Capper. In 1944, KCKN became a basic Mutual Broadcasting System affiliate; it had also reestablished a physical presence in Kansas City, Missouri, with additional offices in the Waltower Building.

==== KCKN after World War II ====
Changing American tastes and lifestyles along with new technology changed radio in the wake of World War II. Principal among the threats to radio was the emergence of television. As radio moved from local programming and network shows to playing recorded music, some things stayed the same. Among the carryovers on KCKN after the war included sports announcer Larry Ray, who continued to provide play-by-play of the Kansas City Blues minor league baseball team; he later moved to WHB and KCMO, called Kansas City Athletics games on the radio, and became an insurance executive.

KCKN also sought to enter the world of television. In 1948, it filed to build a station on channel 2. After the four-year freeze and reallocation, KCKN applied again, this time for channel 5, in an application mutually exclusive with that of the KCMO Broadcasting Company. On June 3, 1953, the FCC dismissed the KCKN application, clearing the way for KCMO-TV to launch.

In the early 1950s, KCKN emerged as a dominant station in the Kansas City radio market. Wayne Stitt was the popular host in the mornings, Joe Farrell shared middays with Frank Hassett, and in the evening it was Eddie Clarke from 9 to 11pm. Joe Story was station manager, while George Stump was the program director. Print (newspapers and magazines still dominated) ahead of radio and television was in its infancy. "Prom Magazine" was a weekly publication targeted at the high school and college audience. The station advertised in every edition and coordinated contests on the air and with retail merchants through the magazine.

In 1954, however, Kansas City radio was in for a major shake-up. An innovative and well-financed entrepreneur, Todd Storz, came from Omaha and purchased WHB across the river in Kansas City, Missouri. He pioneered a new concept of pop radio, which would come to be known as Top 40. Storz would survey record sales at retail outlets to determine the top 40 songs being purchased each week and then release WHB's "Top 40 Survey" every Friday afternoon. The survey songs then comprised the station's playlist. Storz knew that to make the new concept successful, he needed to hire the market's highest-rated DJ talent, who would bring their listeners along with them to WHB. Storz raided KCKN, starting by hiring away Stitt and Clarke. The Storz programming at WHB was a huge success, and it led him to develop a chain of stations, all using the same Top 40 format.

The loss of talent at KCKN led to a rapid decline in every aspect of the radio station. Longtime announcer Buddy Black went to WGN in Chicago, while Stump went across the river to KCMO in Kansas City. Soward left for Topeka's WIBW in Topeka, and Bicknell remained in the Kansas City area at KMBC. KCKN was to spend the next few years drifting with little creative focus and a much smaller listening audience.

==== Cy Blumenthal and "countrypolitan" radio ====
Arthur Capper died in December 1951, and in 1956, his estate sold Capper Publications to Stauffer Publications. Stauffer immediately put KCKN up for sale. It was purchased in 1957 by a well-financed country music operator who had been successful in several smaller markets in Virginia. Cy Blumenthal relished the opportunity to take ownership of KCKN in the same market where Storz had so successfully transformed WHB with the Top 40 format. KCKN would remain a low-powered, 250-watt AM signal at 1340 kHz, but the station was still a valuable asset: it operated 24 hours a day, the signal was non-directional, and the call letters were a brand name in the market. Blumenthal flipped the station to a country format, competing against daytimer KIMO. After a year of success, changes in country music, notably competition from rock and roll, hurt the station, and KCKN tried Top 40. While it did fine, other Blumenthal stations, some of them daytimers, did not fare as well, and Blumenthal decided to flip his entire chain back to country music. At KCKN, this entailed luring away Ted Cramer, then the program director of KIMO; Blumenthal appointed Glen M. George as general manager, a post he would hold for the next 16 months. In order to help shed perceptions about country radio and move beyond the "really barefoot sound" at most country stations of the time, Cramer installed a country format with Top 40-esque presentation, called "countrypolitan" radio. Cramer then took a job in West Virginia, and native Kansas Citian Harry Becker returned from Texas in 1961 to become program director. Becker brought "Uncle Don" Rhea with him to work the vital morning drive shift. In 1962, Blumenthal received FCC permission to operate full-time at 1,000 watts. Cramer returned from West Virginia to become program director, and Becker took a midday air shift.

As part of the Stauffers' spinning off of KCKN, the station had to be relocated out of The Kansas City Kansan's offices. The station purchased a three-story, wood-frame farm house on the edge of town, at 4121 Minnesota Avenue, and converted it into studios and offices. A new, 150-foot guy-wired tower was constructed at the rear of the property. The large, open acreage, accessible by an asphalt road, was named "Radio Park".

The kinds of changes that Blumenthal had found successful in the smaller markets with the country audience were put into practice at KCKN. On-air voices were more professional and with a higher energy level than the hokey, down-home approach used in earlier years. The broadcast equipment was new and production values were high. The dee-jays were tight, with no dead air or long pauses. These changes got the positive results Blumenthal wanted; despite an increasingly competitive radio market, KCKN's listenership grew steadily.

In March 1962, Blumenthal received the construction permit for an FM station at 94.1 MHz, with an effective radiated power of 20,000 watts. The FM antenna was added near the top of the tower built in 1957, and on May 28, 1963, KCKN-FM signed on, carrying a simulcast of its AM sister 50 percent of the day while originating its own country music format for the remainder. It had an effective signal for approximately 50 miles and was non-directional.

==== Becoming a country leader ====
One of the methods of attracting listeners and building loyalty for Storz and WHB was applied by program director Cramer. Each week, retailers at geographically even locations across the metropolitan area were surveyed to determine the lists of the best-selling songs. Then Cramer, using an intricate points system, determined the sales level 1 through 50 and the KCKN Fabulous 50 countdown survey was developed. This, along with the major-market sounding dee-jays, quality production values, reliable news, weather and traffic elements, were key reasons KCKN became a dominant station again in a much more competitive marketplace than it had in those early years of radio.

There were several other innovative and creative methods that were used in the 1960s and 1970s to enable the low-powered, 1,000-watt KCKN to get the most reach possible from its signal. Chief engineer Jim Jett was using several equalizing techniques to make the signal sound brighter, fuller and bigger than it was to the listener. Cramer came up with the concept that reverberation or reverb would give the AM signal a sound of more depth. Jett purchased a $10 reverb section from an old Hammond organ and integrated it into the transmitter's audio processing chain. This made the small signal sound huge for only 1,000 watts. A simple doorbell chime was installed and every time an on-air time check was given, the chime was rung. The chime gave AM and FM the most identifiable sounder in Kansas City radio, and it took positive advantage of the other enhancements made to the AM side.

In July 1965, Cy Blumenthal sold the radio stations to entertainer Danny Kaye and his business manager Lester Smith. He sold them the AM station, but gave them the FM station at no cost as a bonus. While many FM stations were going on the air, it would be another decade before the significant listener migration from AM to FM would begin in earnest. The new enterprise was known as Seattle, Portland and Spokane Radio—the names of the cities where Kaye and Smith owned other radio stations. With the Kansas City acquisition, the operation was renamed Kaye-Smith Radio, Inc., and was headquartered in Bellevue, Washington. Because of the success George and Cramer were having with the country music format, Kaye and Smith remained hands-off owners, and KCKN-AM-FM continued with the same on-air product.

The station remained successful, and Kaye-Smith invested heavily in studios, offices, and equipment, reflecting its status as a market and industry leader. In 1971, a new custom-designed building, built at a cost of $500,000, was constructed to the east of the old farmhouse, which was demolished. Kansas City, Kansas built a previously non-existent street, 41st Terrace, one-third of a mile from US 24-40 (State Avenue) to the station's parking lot, and adjacent property was sold to a company which built a big box store. Interstate 635 was built along the west side of the property, making the station facility easily accessible from the entire region. A new 460-foot (140 m) guy-wired tower was built in the summer of 1971 to replace the tower constructed in 1957. The additional height was necessary to allow KCKN-FM to increase its power to 100,000 watts. The AM station also moved to the new tower, retaining its existing power level.

KCKN's success in country music attracted national attention. When Time published a full-page article in 1972 on the growth of country music, it featured general manager George and program director Kramer. Cramer was also tapped by Kaye-Smith to revamp Cincinnati's WUBE-AM-FM along the lines of KCKN. One of the first promotional tools used on the street was a striking green Nash Metropolitan car, sporting the station call letters painted across each side and the rear in garish yellow and used as a mobile unit. It was equipped with a two-way radio to go on the air from the street and a speaker so people could hear what was on the air at promotional events. Later promotions built on this theme under PD Mike Shanin. The "Fun Spot" van (which cruised KC streets looking for bright yellow decals on vehicles) was driven by an attractive personality, K C Denim, who gave away prizes to listeners with the Fun Spot.

"Happy Harry" Becker held down the 9 a.m. to noon slot for more than 15 years. Harry attracted a following by interspersing "Becker's-Bargain-Basement" in five-minute segments during each hour of the three-hour show. Listeners could call in with one item to sell or buy, give a phone number and get right off. Becker was quick and the calls were tight, with no dead air. Following Becker's hemorrhoid surgery, he had to sit on an inflated plastic ring for several weeks, and a contest was created so that a listener would win a prize by guessing the day Harry no longer had to sit on the rubber ring. Becker's show ended each day at 11:58 with Kansas City, Kansas Deputy Fire Chief George Casey who would list the department's runs and the outcomes with his monotone voice: "Fire calls the past 24 hours in Kansas City, Kansas...".

George and Cramer established a growth pattern for the station with revenue being generated by the added FM signal, the audience gains generated by Rhea and Becker, and the goal that KCKN-AM-FM be "full-service" stations. In the news department, the much larger AP replaced the UPI radio news wire. The ABC Information Network audio service and a direct-line National Weather Service wire were added. Morning and afternoon drive time traffic reports were added with Kansas City, Missouri, police officer Steve Untriff. The local news staff was built up to four full-time people, who eventually produced 24-hour-a-day sponsored newscasts. Newscasts were seven minutes at the top of each hour with half-hour headlines during morning and afternoon drive time.

The Associated Press cited KCKN News for nationally breaking the news of former President Harry S. Truman's fatal illness in December 1972. The AP recognized the station's news department again in 1974 for "Best Weekend News Coverage - State of Kansas". KCKN became a widely respected radio station in every competitive aspect of the broadcast industry.

Other on-air DJs and newscasters included: Dave Estes (employed 1967–77), Doug Dillon (1966–1975), Bill Abbott (1967–72), Gary Brazeal (1968–73), Jim Beedle (1969–74), JB Carmicle (1972–77), "Moon" Mullins (1961–66, Country Music Hall of Fame inductee, 2009); Dave Morton (News 1965–83), Bill Freeman (ND 1966–1970), Jack Emmerson (ND 1970–72), Mike Shanin (ND 1972–1980), Joe Vaughan (1972–77), Jim Bowlin (1969–73), Pam Voreis, Neil Stempleman, Jim Clark, Tim Wallace, "Uncle" Don Rhea, Noel Scott (1977–1981), Rick Douglass, Dan Roberts, John Leslie, Don Perry, John Duncan, Roger Carson, "Cactus Jack" Call, Don Burley, Charlie Knight, Don Register, Wes Cunningham, Chris Collier, Bill Honeycutt, Jesse Sherwood, Jay Sanders, Bob Compton, Dan Crary, Jack Rudnay (Sports) and Lupe Quintana (one-hour weekly Spanish language program for more than 20 years).

Long-term DJ Jack Wesley "Cactus Jack" Call moved to KCMK a week before his death in a car crash on January 23, 1963, near U.S. Highway 40 and Sterling in Independence, Missouri. Six weeks later, on March 3, Patsy Cline along with numerous other stars sang at a Memorial Hall benefit for the family he left behind. After leaving from Fairfax Airport two days later, Cline, along with Hawkshaw Hawkins, Cowboy Copas and concert promoter/manager Randy Hughes were all killed in the 1963 Camden, TN Piper Comanche plane crash en route to Nashville.

In 2010, Cy Blumenthal was posthumously inducted into the Country Radio Hall of Fame, recognized as the first man to own a chain of large-market country music stations. Several of Blumenthal's former staffers, including Don Owens, Ted Cramer, Don Rhea, Joe Hoppel, Moon Mullins and Dale Carter (who would later work at KFKF), are enshrined in the Country Music DJ Hall of Fame.

=== Post-KCKN era ===
In 1980, Kaye-Smith began to sell its stations, and in late October, it sold KCKN-AM-FM to Allbritton Communications for $4 million. At the time, Allbritton owned three television stations and several newspapers but no radio stations.

In February 1982, Allbritton broke off the simulcast and changed both stations' call letters. On FM, KFKF-FM would continue to be Kansas City's country music station of record. 1340 AM became "KR 1340" KRKR with an album rock format. Late in 1983, Allbritton exited radio and sold KRKR and KFKF-FM to Sconnix Broadcasting, a group headed by Scott R. McQueen. Under the new ownership, 1340 became a partial simulcast of KFKF-FM with a country music format, taking on the KFKF calls for itself. In 1985, with the KCKN callsign having been claimed by a station in Roswell, New Mexico, 1340 became KCKM until 1987, when it became KFKF again.

=== Synchronous operation as KNHN ===
In 1991, the relationship between AM and FM was severed once and for all when KFKF was sold to KCBR-AM Limited Partnership, owned by Bill Johnson, and became KNHN, a news/talk station known as "CNN 1340". KNHN executed an ambitious and experimental plan to expand its coverage; in 1993, it bought another station on 1340, KSEK in Pittsburg, Kansas, and began synchronous operation with the station (which took on new KPHN call letters). In between the two facilities, KNHN received a construction permit to build a synchronous 200-watt booster at Amoret, Missouri. KNHN offered listeners news/talk programming, CNN Headline News audio overnights, and Kansas State University sports coverage.

In 1997, KCBR-AM Limited Partnership acquired 1190 KFEZ (now KDMR), a 5,000-watt station running an adult standards format. Ownership decided to relocate the news/talk format to the stronger 1190 signal, and on March 3, 1997, the talk programs moved to 1190 as KPHN and 1340 became KFEZ with the adult standards programming. Additionally, the Pittsburg 1340 station, which sported the KNHN calls after the swap, was spun off and returned to local operation as KSEK that August, unwinding the synchronous operation experiment (though KDTD continues to possess the authorization for the Amoret booster, it was dismantled).

=== The return to KCKN ===
In 2000, KCBR leased KFEZ to James Crystal Holdings, a religious broadcaster, with an option to buy. While Crystal's time programming 1340 AM with a contemporary Christian format would be short, running just 18 months, Crystal would take an unusual step. It bought KCKN in Roswell, New Mexico, for $2.5 million and changed its calls so that the Kansas City station could reclaim the call sign.

While Crystal had an option to buy the Kansas City station, they never exercised it. Instead, Miles Carter and the Carter Broadcast Group acquired KCKN in 2001, and new programming followed on November 15 when the station became sports-formatted "Fox Sports 1340". The station was sold to All Comedy Radio in 2004 and began running that network's programming.

=== KDTD and Spanish-language programming ===
Davidson Media Group, owner of 1480 KCZZ, acquired KCKN in 2005 and changed its call letters to KDTD on December 12. KCZZ had been running a hybrid sports/Regional Mexican format, and the Regional Mexican programming moved to 1340. (The KCKN calls returned to Roswell in 2006.) KDTD would be leased to Reyes Media Group, publisher of the Dos Mundos local Spanish-language newspaper, which operates KCZZ, KDTD and separately owned 1250 KYYS.

As KDTD, the station has occasionally had sports coverage, though sports events have since migrated to the other Reyes stations. KDTD was the former Spanish-language flagship of Sporting Kansas City, now heard on KCZZ, and until 2017, it was also the Spanish-language home of the Kansas City Chiefs (whose games moved to FM translator-bearing KCTO). In July 2015, the Kansas City Royals broadcast their first-ever game in Spanish on KDTD; they are now heard on KYYS.

In 2015, Davidson sold KDTD and KCZZ to TBLC Holdings, owned by Mahan M. Janbakhsh, in a transaction also involving stations in Virginia and North and South Carolina. The deal was consummated on November 9, 2015.

Effective March 24, 2020, TBLC Holdings sold KDTD and KCZZ to Edward Reyes' Reyes Media Group, Inc., for $600,000.
