= KSJQ =

- Savannah, Missouri; United States
- Broadcast area: St. Joseph - Maryville
- Frequency: 92.7 MHz
- Branding: Q Country 92.7

Programming
- Format: Country music

Ownership
- Owner: Eagle Communications, Inc.

History
- First air date: 1991

Technical information
- Licensing authority: FCC
- Facility ID: 59246
- Class: C2
- ERP: 50,000 watts
- HAAT: 150 meters (490 ft)
- Transmitter coordinates: 39°58′35″N 94°58′40″W

Links
- Public license information: Public file; LMS
- Webcast: Listen live
- Website: myqcountry.com

KSJQ (92.7 FM) is a commercial radio station licensed to Savannah, Missouri, and serving the St. Joseph and Maryville areas of Missouri. It airs a country music format and is owned by Eagle Communications, Inc.

== History ==
The station signed on in late 1991. It has always carried a country music format. Original license holder Sara Blann transferred control of the station to current owner Eagle Communications in 1993.

The station shares studios in St. Joseph with its sister stations KKJO, KFEQ, KESJ, and KYSJ.
