= KCMO (disambiguation) =

KCMO is the abbreviation for Kansas City, Missouri, informally.

KCMO may refer to:

- KCMO (AM), a radio station (710 AM) licensed to Kansas City, Missouri, United States
- KCMO-FM, a radio station (94.9 FM) licensed to Kansas City, Missouri, United States
- KCHZ, a radio station (95.7) licensed to Ottawa, Kansas simulcasting KCMO 710
- KCTV (TV), a television station (channel 5) licensed to Kansas City, Missouri, United States, which used the call signs KCMO and KCMO-TV until March 1983
