= Perpetual Peace: A Philosophical Sketch =

1795 book by Immanuel Kant

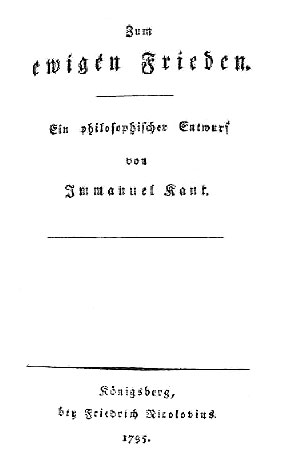
- Cover of the book
- Author: Immanuel Kant
- Original title: Zum ewigen Frieden. Ein philosophischer Entwurf
- Language: German
- Subject: Philosophy
- Set in: Konigsberg
- Publisher: F. Nicolovius
- Publication date: 1795
- Publication place: Germany
- Pages: 114
- Preceded by: Über den Gemeinspruch: Das mag in der Theorie richtig sein, taugt aber nicht für die Praxis (1793)
- Followed by: Metaphysik der Sitten (1797)

Perpetual Peace: A Philosophical Sketch (German: Zum ewigen Frieden. Ein philosophischer Entwurf) is a 1795 book authored by the German philosopher Immanuel Kant. In the book, Kant advances ideas that have subsequently been associated with democratic peace, commercial peace, and institutional peace.

== Summary ==
Kant proposed a peace program to be implemented by governments. The "Preliminary Articles" described these steps that should be taken immediately, or with all deliberate speed:

1. "No secret treaty of peace shall be held valid in which there is tacitly reserved matter for a future war"
2. "No independent states, large or small, shall come under the dominion of another state by inheritance, exchange, purchase, or donation"
3. "Standing armies shall in time be totally abolished"
4. "National debts shall not be contracted with a view to the external friction of states"
5. "No state shall by force interfere with the constitution or government of another state"
6. "No state shall, during war, permit such acts of hostility which would make mutual confidence in the subsequent peace impossible: such are the employment of assassins (percussores), poisoners (venefici), breach of capitulation, and incitement to treason (perduellio) in the opposing state"

Three Definitive Articles would provide not merely a cessation of hostilities but a foundation on which to build a peace.

I.—"The civil constitution of each state shall be republican."

II.—"The law of nations shall be founded on a federation of free states."

III.—"The rights of men, as citizens of the world, shall be limited to the conditions of universal hospitality."

Finally, Kant adds two supplements and an "Appendix" with two appendices:

First supplement: "Concerning the guarantee of perpetual peace"

Second supplement: "A secret article for perpetual peace"

Appendix I.—"On the disagreement between morals and politics with reference to perpetual peace"

Appendix II.—"Concerning the harmony of politics with morals according to the transcendental idea of public right"

Kant's essay in some ways resembles modern democratic peace theory. He speaks of republican, Republikanisch (not democratic) states, which he defines to have representative governments, in which the legislature is separated from the executive. Kant claims that the republics will be at peace with each other, as they will tend towards pacifism more so than other forms of government. The essay does not treat republican governments as sufficient by themselves to produce peace: universal hospitality (ius cosmopoliticum) and a federation of free states are necessary to consciously enact his six-point program.

Kant also specifies the rights universal hospitality affords strangers: to visit a foreign land under the presumption that they will be treated without hostility if presenting without malintent—as well as its limitations: "the nation may send [the visitor] away again, if this can be done without causing his death" and that it is "not a right to be treated as a guest to which the stranger can lay claim" —these rights being necessary to accomplish the ultimate goal of intercommunication and peaceful relations between nations.

Kant argued against a world government, arguing it would be prone to tyranny. The preferable solution to anarchy in the international system was to create a league of independent republican states.

== Legacy and influence ==
The general idea that popular and responsible governments would be more inclined to promote peace and commerce became one current in the stream of European thought and political practice. It was one element of the British foreign policy of George Canning and Lord Palmerston. It was also represented in the American liberal internationalism of Woodrow Wilson's Fourteen Points. Kant's recommendations were clearly represented in the 1940s in the United Nations.

In the early days of the First World War, H.G. Wells stated that it would be "the war to end war", on the grounds that, once Prussian militarism and autocracy was replaced by popular government, European nations would not ever go to war with each other, because militarism and armaments resulted from the German threat. This idea was much repeated and simplified over the next four years; at present, the idea that democracy by itself should prevent or minimize war is represented by various democratic peace theories.

In 1909, Norman Angell relied only upon the second leg, arguing that modern commerce made war necessarily unprofitable, even for the technically victorious country, and therefore the possibility of successful war was The Great Illusion. James Mill had described colonialism as outdoor relief for the upper classes; Joseph Schumpeter argued that capitalism made modern states inherently peaceful and opposed to conquest and imperialism, which economically favored the old aristocratic elites.

This theory has been well developed in recent years. Mansfield and Pollins, writing in the Journal of Conflict Resolution, summarize a large body of empirical work which, for the most part, supports the thesis. There are various exceptions and qualifications which seem to limit the circumstances under which economic interdependence results in conflict reduction. The third leg is the old idea that a confederation of peaceable princes could produce a perpetual peace. Kant had distinguished his league from a universal state; Clarence Streit proposed, in Union Now (1938), a union of the democratic states modelled after the Constitution of the United States. He argued that trade and the peaceable ways of democracy would keep this Union perpetual, and counted on the combined power of the Union to deter the Axis from war.

Jeremy Bentham proposed that disarmament, arbitration, and the renunciation of colonies would produce perpetual peace, thus relying merely on Kant's preliminary articles and on none of the three main points; contrary to the modern theorists, he relied on public opinion, even against the absolute monarchy in Sweden.

== Editions ==
- Immanuel Kant, To perpetual peace: a philosophical sketch, Hackett Publishing, 2003.
- Immanuel Kant, "5. Perpetual peace: a philosophical sketch" in Political Writings, Cambridge University Press, 1991.
- Immanuel Kant, "Toward perpetual peace" in Practical Philosophy, Cambridge University Press, 1999.

== See also ==
- 1795 in literature
- Immanuel Kant bibliography
- World peace
