= KFEQ =

- St. Joseph, Missouri; United States
- Broadcast area: Northwest Missouri
- Frequency: 680 kHz
- Branding: 680 KFEQ

Programming
- Format: News/talk/sports/farm
- Network: Fox News Radio
- Affiliations: Premiere Networks; Westwood One

Ownership
- Owner: Eagle Communications, Inc.
- Sister stations: KBCT; KESJ; KKJO-FM; KSJQ; KYSJ

History
- First air date: December 27, 1926

Technical information
- Licensing authority: FCC
- Facility ID: 34419
- Class: B
- Power: 5,000 watts
- Transmitter coordinates: 39°49′43″N 94°48′20.9″W
- Translator: 95.3 K237HF (St. Joseph)

Links
- Public license information: Public file; LMS
- Webcast: Listen live
- Website: www.680kfeq.com

KFEQ (680 kHz) is a commercial AM radio station in St. Joseph, Missouri. It is owned by Eagle Communications and airs a news-talk-sports-farm reports radio format. The studios and offices are on Country Lane in St. Joseph along with sister stations KKJO, KSJQ, KESJ, KYSJ, and KBCT.

KFEQ broadcasts at 5,000 watts using a directional antenna. The transmitter site is on Miller Road, near Interstate 29 in St. Joseph. Due to the station's low frequency, transmitter power, and northwest Missouri's high goundwave conductuity, it provides at least secondary coverage to portions of Missouri, Kansas, Nebraska and Iowa during the day, including Kansas City, Topeka and Omaha. At night, a four-tower array is used to protect Class A clear-channel station KNBR in San Francisco. KFEQ concentrates its nighttime signal toward the St. Joseph and Kansas City areas.

KFEQ is also heard on a 250-watt FM translator station, 95.3 K237HF.

KFEQ carries Mizzou football and basketball, as well as Kansas City Royals baseball and Kansas City Chiefs football. Most hours begin with reports from Fox News Radio.

== Notable personalities ==
Gene Millard, longtime host of AgriShop, retired from KFEQ in February 2020 after more than 50 years in broadcasting. His retirement marked the end of the long-running AgriShop program. Millard began his farm broadcasting career in the mid-1960s and joined KFEQ as Assistant Farm Director in 1964 after graduating from Colorado State University with a degree in General Agriculture. Over the decades, he became known for his leadership in the broadcasting industry, serving as President of the Missouri Broadcasters Association from 1983 to 1984, and chairing the NAFB Sales and Marketing Board. His work earned numerous awards and honors, including the NAFB Meritorious Service Award in 1990, induction into the NAFB Hall of Fame in 2010, the Missouri Broadcasters Association Hall of Fame in 2019, and the St. Joseph Chamber of Commerce Ag Hall of Fame in 2006. That same year, he received the Agricultural Business Council of Kansas City’s Jay B. Dillingham Award for Agricultural Leadership and Excellence.

Bob Orf, who began his career at KFEQ in 1975, served as program director and was the longtime Voice of the Griffons for Missouri Western State University sports, beginning football broadcasts in 1975, men's basketball in 1989, and women's basketball in 1992. He retired from KFEQ in 2013. Orf was inducted into the Missouri Western State University Hall of Fame in 2010, and the St. Joseph Sports Commission Hall of Fame in 2025.

Veteran news director Barry Birr, who also hosted The Hotline, a local weekday morning talk show, retired from KFEQ in early 2025 after 41 years with the station.

Tom Brand came to KFEQ in 1996 to serve as Farm Director from KMA in Shenandoah, Iowa. Brand also hosted The Mid-Day Farm Report weekdays and The Saturday Morning Get-Together. He left KFEQ in 2011 to become the Executive Director of the National Association of Farm Broadcasting.

== History ==
KFEQ was first licensed on March 16, 1923 to John L. Scroggin, head of the Scroggin & Co. Bank in Oak, Nebraska. The call letters were randomly assigned from an alphabetical list, and its original transmitting wavelength was 360 meters (833 kHz). In late 1926, the station moved from Oak to St. Joseph, and KFEQ made its St. Joseph debut broadcast on December 27, 1926, with an announced schedule of 8:30 until 11 p.m. The first broadcasts used a temporary transmitter and antenna in the Hotel Robidoux. Technical complications resulting from interaction with the steel building structure in the hotel knocked the station off the air for two weeks in January 1927, and prompted relocation of the transmitter and antenna to the Prospect Hill area at Poulin and Elwood Streets, near Huston Wyeth Park in northwest St. Joseph.

The main broadcast studios were initially located in a garage on St. Joseph Avenue, but were later re-located to the mezzanine level of the Hotel Robidoux in downtown St. Joseph. (There are conflicting reports as to the St. Joseph Avenue studio location as the first broadcast was reported as being from the Hotel, in the original 1926 newspaper reports.) The station was noted for its live remote daily broadcasts three times each day from the St. Joseph Stockyards and four times each day from the St. Joseph Grain Exchange.

Following a series of frequency changes, on November 11, 1928, under the provisions of the Federal Radio Commission's General Order 40, KFEQ was assigned to 560 kHz on a timesharing basis with WOI in Ames, Iowa. It was limited to daytime-only operation, with a power of 2,500 watts. On December 1, 1929, KFEQ moved from 560 kHz to its present frequency of 680 kHz and broadcast on a full daytime schedule. On February 10, 1938, the station moved its transmitter and tower to a location on Pickett Road, 3 miles east of the St. Joseph city limits.

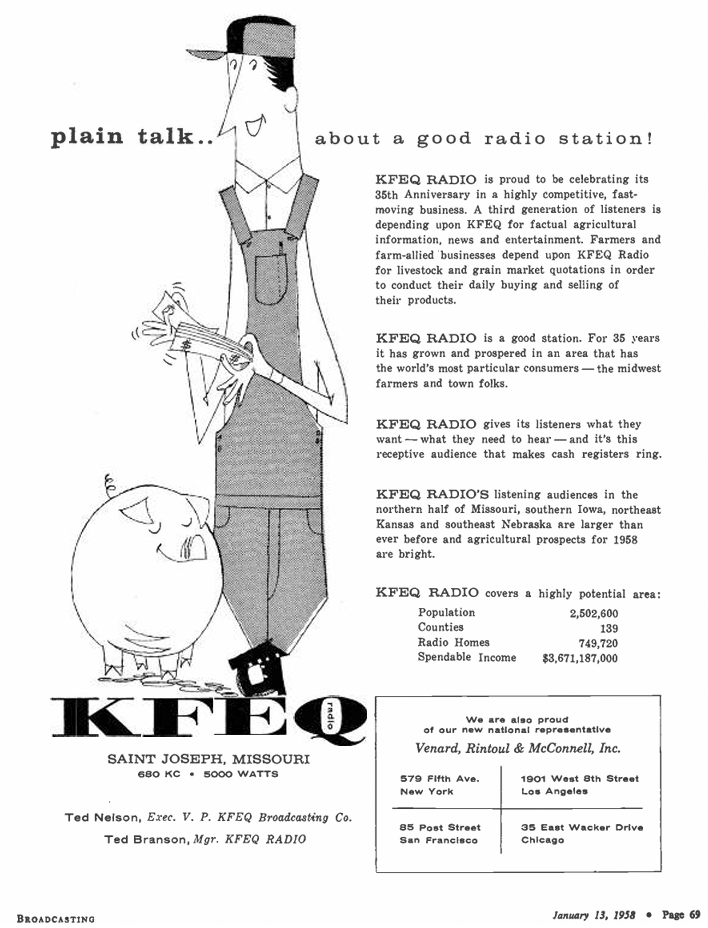
1958 station advertisement.

In 1943, the station was allowed to stay on the air around the clock with 5,000 watts. At that time in 1943, the transmitter site was moved to its present location just north of St.Joseph and the current directional antenna facility was installed. It was an affiliate of the NBC Blue Network, running its schedule of comedies, dramas, news and sports during the "Golden Age of Radio". The Blue Network became ABC in 1945.

KFEQ moved its main studios from the Hotel Robidoux to the third floor of the Schneider building in 1933, and then to the 4th and 5th floors of the KFEQ building (later named the Howitt Building) at 8th and Frederick in 1947. While at the KFEQ Building, on May 2, 1948, the station placed KFEQ-FM on the air for two years on 92.3 MHz. The FM broadcasts were discontinued in June 1950. In 1956, the main studios were relocated to the KFEQ-TV building at 40th and Faraon Street.

KFEQ also had a TV station for a time, KFEQ-TV (channel 2), which went on the air on September 27, 1953. Even though it was based in St. Joseph, KFEQ-TV took out an advertisement in the 1957-58 Telecasting Yearbook to boast of its effective radiated power of 100,000 watts and covered 37 counties, including part of the Kansas City media market. In 1955, KFEQ-AM-TV were sold to the Midland Broadcasting Company. Midland Broadcasting was part-owned by singer-actor Bing Crosby and previously owned KMBC-TV in Kansas City. During the years KFEQ radio was part of the KFEQ-TV organization, several local personalities performed dual roles in programs on both TV and radio, among them were Bill Foster, Ron Davis, and newsman Frank Smith.

In 1969, the two stations were sold to different owners. The TV station changed its call sign to KQTV. KFEQ kept its original callsign as it was acquired by Connie B. Gay Enterprises, using the title "KFEQ, Inc." As a result, the main studios were moved to the Frederick Towers building, located at 2400 Frederick Avenue, where they remained until 1976. In 1976, the main studios were relocated to the Provident Savings and Loan Building at 4305 Frederick Avenue.

Prior to 1974, KFEQ played easy listening, adult music and variety programs. From 1974 through the 1990s, the station played country music, in addition to its farm reports, sports and news. It called itself "Country Sunshine". It also broadcast St. Louis Cardinals baseball games. Through the 1990s, KFEQ added more talk programming and cut the amount of country music it was playing, until it made the transition to a full-time format of talk, news and farm reports. It was acquired by Eagle Communications in 1991.

One of the station's four towers was toppled in a farming accident on June 16, 2009. All four towers were rebuilt and placed into service in 2010.

Logo before translator sign on
