= KMXV =

Contemporary hit radio station in Kansas City

Coordinates: 39.016°N 94.507°W

- Kansas City, Missouri; United States
- Broadcast area: Kansas City metropolitan area
- Frequency: 93.3 MHz
- Branding: Mix 93.3

Programming
- Language: English
- Format: Contemporary hit radio

Ownership
- Owner: Steel City Media; (MGTF Media Company, LLC)
- Sister stations: KBEQ-FM, KCKC, KFKF-FM

History
- First air date: March 3, 1958
- Former call signs: KCMK (1958–1971); KWKI (1971–1982); KLSI (1982–1990)
- Call sign meaning: Mix, Variety

Technical information
- Licensing authority: FCC
- Facility ID: 2446
- Class: C0
- ERP: 100,000 watts
- HAAT: 325 meters (1,066 ft)

Links
- Public license information: Public file; LMS
- Webcast: Listen live; Listen live (via iHeartRadio)
- Website: mix93.com

KMXV (93.3 FM, "Mix 93.3") is a contemporary hit radio station licensed to Kansas City, Missouri, United States. Owned by Steel City Media, the station's studios are located at Westport Center in Midtown Kansas City, and the transmitter site is in the city's East Side.

== History ==
=== KCMK-FM (1958–1971) ===
The station signed on March 3, 1958, as KCMK-FM (Kansas City, Missouri/Kansas) with 35,000 watts of power. The station primarily aired classical music, with some other types of music thrown in.

In 1963, the station began airing a country music format. DJ Jack Wesley "Cactus Jack" Call was at the station (from KCKN) for one week when he was killed on January 25, 1963 in a car crash. Singer Patsy Cline sang at a benefit for him at Memorial Hall in Kansas City, Kansas on March 3, 1963. She was unable to leave Kansas City the next day because the airport was fogged in and was killed in a plane crash on March 5, 1963 en route from Fairfax Airport to Nashville.

For a brief period in mid-1965, KCMK called itself the "oasis in a musical desert", but would soon return to playing country. Starting in September 1969, the station aired an R&B format, competing against KPRS.

=== KWKI (1971–1982) ===
In 1971, the station changed call letters to KWKI and returned to a country music format. After a brief stint with a Top 40 format in 1973, KWKI became "The Rock of Kansas City" in 1974. With this format, it became the first true rock station in Kansas City. The station was initially popular with its progressive rock format, but lost steam with KYYS signing on with a more mainstream rock presentation later that year.

In 1978, the station was sold to Jimmy Swaggart Ministries. Religious programming began airing on December 11, 1978. In 1980, KWKI upgraded to 100,000 watts.

=== KLSI (1982–1991) ===
In 1982, Great Plains Radio bought KWKI. On May 20, KWKI changed formats to soft adult contemporary, and changed call letters to KLSI on July 4. The first song under the new format was "Kansas City Lights" by Steve Wariner. The station was initially referred to on air as "The New 93", but soon adopted the "Classy 93" moniker. By the late 1980s, KLSI dropped the "Classy" name, referring to itself by their call letters.

=== KMXV (1991–Present) ===
==== Hot AC (1991–1994) ====
Following the purchase of the station by Apollo Broadcasting in April 1990, the station rebranded as "Mix 93". In addition, their call letters were changed to KMXV (which were adopted on November 15, 1991), and the station shifted towards the growing hot AC format.

==== Top 40 (1994–Present) ====
In February 1993, longtime Top 40 outlet KBEQ flipped to country, leaving the Kansas City market with only one Top 40 station, KISF. However, KISF had a rimshot signal from the eastern part of the market (its transmitter was located near Odessa, Missouri at the time), while KMXV had a full-market, 100,000-watt signal, and a transmitter located within the city limits near the Truman Sports Complex, alongside most of the market's FM and TV stations. Taking advantage of the lack of a full-market signal for the format, KMXV began a slow transition to Top 40 from October 1993 through early 1994, shifting the adult contemporary format and personalities over to then-sister KUDL. On March 28, the change to "Mix 93.3" was complete. In the beginning, KMXV offered a heavily dance-leaning rhythmic Top 40 direction, but by January 1996, under the direction of new program director Jon Zellner, it had evolved to a more broad-based mainstream Top 40 which leaned at times towards adult/modern product in certain dayparts. By the Spring of 1997, Zellner led KMXV from 14th (a year earlier) to the #1 ranked radio station in Kansas City, a position it held three other times throughout the late 1990s and early 2000s.

During the 1990s, KMXV underwent many ownership changes. Regent Broadcasting bought the station in June 1995, with Jacor purchasing it in October 1996. Jacor then sold the station to American Radio Systems in July 1997. Westinghouse/CBS bought American Radio Systems' stations (including KMXV) on September 19, 1997. In June 1998, CBS split off the radio division under the revived Infinity Broadcasting name, which would be renamed CBS Radio in December 2005. KMXV was sold off by CBS to Wilks Broadcasting in November 2006 as part of a nationwide reduction of radio stations by CBS. On June 12, 2014, Wilks announced that it was selling its Kansas City cluster (of which KMXV is part of) to Pittsburgh-based Steel City Media. The sale was approved on September 26, and was consummated on September 30.

Despite being in competition with Top 40 station KKSW and rival KCHZ offering more rhythmic content than KMXV, KMXV maintained high ratings for years. However, this changed in late 2010, when KCHZ began overtaking them in the ratings. To combat this, KMXV began leaning more towards rhythmic content, while edging away from its long-time adult lean, and with sister station KCKC having relaunched its AC format with an upbeat approach in 2014, KMXV has moved more towards a current-based presentation in line with other Top 40/CHRs in the United States. (KCHZ's Top 40 format would move to sister KMJK (the former KISF) in October 2023) and later KCJK in 2026.

== Red, White and Boom ==
KMXV produces an annual, day-long concert every year with the title "Red White and Boom". Artists such as Ashlee Simpson, Def Leppard, Melissa Etheridge, Maroon 5, Kelly Clarkson, Jesse McCartney, Destiny's Child, Daughtry, P!NK, Nick Lachey, Bon Jovi, Jordin Sparks, and Lifehouse have performed. It has been running since 1996, when it starred the Spin Doctors, Dog's Eye View and Lisa Loeb.

The concert was staged at the Sandstone Amphitheater in Bonner Springs, Kansas, although in 2011, the venue was changed to Worlds of Fun in Kansas City, Missouri. In 2012, "Red White and Boom" was held at Starlight Theatre on June 23. The following year, it was also held at Starlight Theatre on July 5, where the show was headlined by Carly Rae Jepsen. In 2014, Fall Out Boy led another successful year for Red, White and Boom.
