= KSFT =

KSFT may refer to:

- KSFT-FM, a radio station (107.1 FM) licensed to South Sioux City, Nebraska, United States
- KESJ, a radio station (1550 AM) licensed to St. Joseph, Missouri, United States, which held the call sign KSFT from March 1989 to August 2009
