= The Kansan =

The Kansan may refer to:

- Kansas City Kansan, newspaper
- Newton Kansan, newspaper
- The Kansan (film)

== See also ==
- University Daily Kansan, student newspaper serving the University of Kansas, often referred to as The Kansan
