= KSJM =

KSJM may refer to:

- KSJM (FM), a radio station (89.1 FM) licensed to St. James, Minnesota, United States
- KWLS, a radio station (107.9 FM) licensed to Wichita, Kansas, United States, which held the call sign KSJM from 2000 to 2007
