= KCXM =

KCXM may refer to:

- KCXM-LP, a low-power radio station (95.1 FM) licensed to serve Kimberling City, Missouri, United States
- KLRX, a radio station (97.3 FM) licensed to serve Lee's Summit, Missouri, which held the call sign KCXM from 2005 to 2007
