= KMJK =

Adult hits radio station in Kansas City

- North Kansas City, Missouri; United States
- Broadcast area: Kansas City metropolitan area
- Frequency: 107.3 MHz
- Branding: 107.3/102.5 Jack FM

Programming
- Language: English
- Format: Adult hits

Ownership
- Owner: Cumulus Media, Inc.; (CMP Houston-KC, LLC)
- Sister stations: KCFX; KCHZ; KCJK; KCMO; KCMO-FM

History
- First air date: September 11, 1969
- Former call signs: KLEX-FM (1969–1976); KBEK-FM (1976–1984); KCAC (1984–1988); KCFM (1988–1992); KXXR (1992–1993); KISF (1993–1997); KCCX (1997–1998); KNRX (1998–2001)
- Former frequencies: 106.3 MHz (1969-1981)
- Call sign meaning: "Magic" (former moniker)

Technical information
- Licensing authority: FCC
- Facility ID: 33713
- Class: C1
- ERP: 100,000 watts
- HAAT: 299 meters (981 ft)
- Transmitter coordinates: 39.094°N 94.097°W
- Translator: 102.5 K273BZ (Bonner Springs) (relays KCMO-HD2)
- Repeater: 94.9 KCMO-HD2 (Shawnee)

Links
- Public license information: Public file; LMS
- Webcast: Listen live; Listen live; Listen live (via iHeartRadio)
- Website: www.jackfmkc.com

KMJK (107.3 FM "107.3/102.5 Jack FM"), is an adult hits station licensed to serve North Kansas City, Missouri. It is owned by Cumulus Media, with studios on Indian Creek Parkway near Interstate 435 in Overland Park, Kansas, and simulcasts on 102.5 K273BZ in Kansas City proper.

KMJK has an effective radiated power (ERP) of 100,000 watts, its transmitter is located off Pleasant Prairie Road at Doris Neer Road in Napoleon, Missouri.

== History ==
=== Early years ===
What is now KMJK started broadcasting on September 11, 1969, at 106.3 FM as KLEX-FM. The call sign represented the original city of license, Lexington, Missouri. The tower was just north of Odessa, Missouri. The format was country music. The station's call letters changed to KBEK-FM in 1976, and relocated to 107.3 FM in 1981 with a class C signal. The station was locally owned by Lexington Broadcasters, until being sold in September 1989.

In 1984, the station changed formats to satellite-fed adult contemporary music as KCAC. On December 1, 1988, the station flipped back to country music and changed its call sign to KCFM. The station was acquired by Meyer Communications in September 1989.

=== Top 40 KXXR and KISF ===
KCFM swapped formats and frequencies with Capitol Broadcasting's KXXR on February 16, 1992, at midnight. (KXXR was a Top 40 station at 106.5 FM, now WDAF-FM.) The first song played after the swap was "I'm Too Sexy" by Right Said Fred. Meyer continued to own the station, while being operated by Capitol via a local marketing agreement (LMA). The KXXR call letters officially moved to 107.3 FM on March 13, 1992. (106.5, meanwhile, adopted the KKCJ call letters four days earlier.) US Radio, led by Philadelphia attorney Ragan Henry who owned other radio stations across the country, bought the station in October 1992.

On February 4, 1993, after 24 hours of stunting with a loop of "Kiss" by Prince, the station changed call letters to KISF, and rebranded as "Kiss 107.3". After KBEQ's unannounced flip to Country later that month, KISF became the only Top 40 station in the Kansas City market. That changed when KMXV flipped from hot adult contemporary to Top 40 in March 1994. In addition, KMXV had a signal that covered the entire Kansas City metro. Despite KISF lacking full-market coverage, the station still received decent ratings.

=== Modern rock ===
During the mid-1990s, alternative rock was becoming the popular sound of the decade, while the Top 40 format was entering a period of decline. Management decided to follow the trend and compete against Lawrence, Kansas-based KLZR, which was seeing success with the format. KISF started evolving towards modern rock with a lean on 1980s new wave in late 1994, with the shift complete by January 1995, including a slight name change to "107.3 Kiss FM." (The station would later rebrand as simply "107.3".)

With the new format, the station initially had trouble gaining an audience, due in part because the station hung on to remnants of its former format, including imaging and presentation. In addition, the station shifted through several morning shows. Due to US Radio's financing balloon bank note becoming due, Henry was forced to sell his 49-station empire, with KISF being bought by Metropolitan Radio Group in April 1996. Syncom bought the station in May 1997.

The station rebranded as "107.3 The X" on March 16, 1997, and took the new call sign KCCX on June 25 of that year. Classic rock station KCFX nearly threatened to sue the station because the call letters were too similar. To remedy this, the call letters were changed to KNRX on March 1, 1998. During this time, the station started leaning towards the active rock route by playing harder-edged rock acts, to compete with KQRC. The station's airstaff during this period included Kansas City-native Mancow Muller syndicated from Chicago (who began airing in mornings on March 14, 1997). Other DJs included Jason Justice, "The Morning (and later, Afternoon) Headrush" with Jay Charles and Sammye Phelps, and Roach and Sumo (with The Fonz) hosting "The Midnight Moshpit". Specialty programming included "Off the Beaten Track" featuring a freeform format on Friday (and later, Sunday) nights, "Resurrection Sunday" and the syndicated "Out of Order Countdown" with Jed the Fish on weekends.

Likely because of the station's signal issues, and being one of two modern rock stations covering the Kansas City market, in addition to KLZR, the station's ratings were only modest during this time, usually in the mid-2 shares (12+). By the Fall of 1997, the station's ratings plummeted to 15th place with a 1.5 share (12+). Mancow's show was dropped on November 20, 1998.

=== Urban oldies ===
At 10:04 a.m. on January 5, 1999, without warning, KNRX dropped the modern rock format. Jason Justice played the final song on "The X", which was the acoustic version of "Plush" by Stone Temple Pilots. The station then began stunting with a ticking clock and a loop of "1999" by Prince. (On the same day, rival KOZN dropped its modern AC format.)

The following day at noon, KNRX flipped to urban oldies as "K-107, The Rhythm & Soul of Kansas City". K-107's first song was "Celebration" by Kool and The Gang. The station also picked up Tom Joyner for morning drive. The station's ratings began to improve after the flip. In the summer of 1999, "K-107" peaked at a 3.6 share (12+).

=== Urban AC ===
On February 1, 2001, the station's call letters changed to the current KMJK. During the summer of that year, the station moved towards an urban adult contemporary format with the new moniker "Majik 107.3". In October 2003, Cumulus Media purchased KMJK along with Radio 2000-owned KCHZ. In the Summer of 2004, KMJK altered its moniker to "Magic 107.3". In 2008, the station changed its city of license to North Kansas City, Missouri. The station also had an FCC construction permit to move its transmitter from Odessa to a site near Levasy, Missouri.

In 2011, with Cumulus Media's acquisition of Citadel Media, Cumulus announced that KMJK would be spun off and put into a trust called Volt Media, LLC, to meet FCC mandates on ownership limitations. This was despite Citadel not owning any stations in Kansas City. However, in October of the same year, Cumulus announced plans to reacquire the station.

Over the course of 2018, KMJK began dropping most classic soul and pre-1990s music from the playlist, and began adding more hip hop tracks, to better compete against KPRS. During the fall of 2019, the station also dropped the "Magic" moniker, rebranding to "107.3 KC's R&B and Hip Hop", and switching mostly from urban AC to mainstream urban contemporary. By 2023, KMJK's playlist focused primarily on 1990s to current R&B, along with some classic and current hip hop songs.

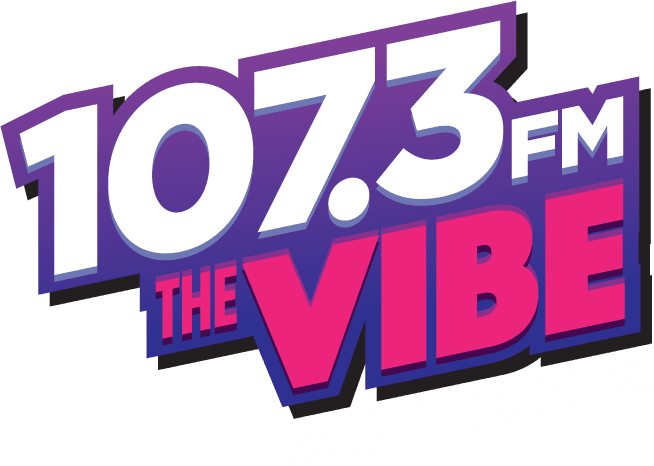
Station logo: 2023-2026

=== Top 40 ===
On September 28, 2023, at 4 pm, after playing "End of the Road" by Boyz II Men, KMJK's urban contemporary format moved to sister station KCJK, which rebranded as "Power 105.1". With the move, the R&B lean was dropped in favor of the inclusion of more hip hop songs. In addition, The D.L. Hughley Show was dropped from afternoons, as well as the weekday evening slow jam program 107.3 After Dark. Both KCJK and KMJK simulcasted until midnight on October 6; at that time, after playing "Turn Yo Clic Up" by Quavo and Future and a short commercial break, KMJK assumed KCHZ's Top 40/CHR format as "107.3 The Vibe". Both KMJK and KCHZ simulcasted until after midnight on October 12, when KCHZ flipped to a simulcast of KCMO's news/talk format.

=== Jack FM ===
On August 11, 2026, at midnight, after playing "Flowers" by Miley Cyrus (by coincidence, the same song that had signed off the "Vibe" format on KCHZ in 2023), the top 40 format moved to sister station KCJK as "Hits 105". Both KCJK and KMJK then simulcasted until August 25 at midnight, when, after playing "Party in the U.S.A." by Miley Cyrus as part of the syndicated Nightly with Jade & Tyler show (followed by the opening moments of "Ordinary" by Alex Warren, abruptly cut off in progress), KMJK flipped to adult hits as "107.3/102.5 Jack FM", joining in a simulcast with KCMO-FM-HD2/K273BZ (the format has aired on the latter two signals since it had itself moved from KCJK in June 2016). The first song as "Jack FM" was "Come Out and Play" by the Offspring.
