= KZPL =

KZPL may refer to:

- KZPL (FM), a radio station (105.1 FM) licensed to serve Encinal, Texas, United States
- KLRX, a radio station (97.3 FM) licensed to serve Lee's Summit, Missouri, United States, which held the call sign KZPL from 2003 to 2005
