= Gretz =

Gretz may refer to:

- Gretz-Armainvilliers, commune in the Île-de-France region, France
- Bob Gretz, American sportswriter and broadcaster
- Wayne Gretzky (born 1961), Canadian ice hockey player and coach
