= KWLS =

Coordinates: 37.263°N 96.895°W

- Winfield, Kansas; United States
- Broadcast area: Winfield-Arkansas City-Wichita, Kansas
- Frequency: 107.9 MHz
- Branding: US 107.9 - Real.American.Country

Programming
- Format: Classic country
- Affiliations: Compass Media Networks

Ownership
- Owner: Giddyup Radio, LLC; (KWLS Radio, LLC)

History
- First air date: 1980
- Former call signs: KSJM (7/12/00-12/31/07); KSOK-FM (6/30/95-7/12/00); KWKS (4/02/80-6/30/95); 790212AG (??-4/02/80)
- Call sign meaning: "Winfield Local Station"

Technical information
- Licensing authority: FCC
- Facility ID: 14239
- Class: C2
- ERP: 50,000 watts
- HAAT: 150 meters (490 ft)

Links
- Public license information: Public file; LMS
- Webcast: Listen Live
- Website: Official Website

KWLS (107.9 FM) is an American radio station that broadcasts a classic country format serving Wichita, Kansas, Winfield, Kansas, and northern Oklahoma.

== History ==
107.9 FM signed in 1980 as KWKS, an adult contemporary station licensed to and serving Winfield (as is stated in their call letters). It changed its call letters to KSOK-FM in 1995. The station was sold to Sherman Broadcasting, with hopes of bringing an urban-formatted station to Kansas and to compete against KDGS.

=== Hot 107.9 Jamz ===
The "Hot 107.9 Jamz" format debuted on July 1, 2000, with the call letters KSJM and an Urban AC format. The station's first song was "Got To Be Real" by Cheryl Lynn. The station was the Wichita affiliate of the Tom Joyner Morning Show. In 2002, the station started adding Jazz into its programming after the demise of Smooth Jazz station KWSJ (now News Talk KNSS-FM). The station's first studios were located in the Equity Bank building at Kellogg and Rock in East Wichita. A few years later, the station relocated its studios to the Carriage Parkway shopping center near Central and Edgemoor.

In 2004, KSJM added hip hop to the playlist, shifting towards an Urban Contemporary format. The station also picked up Doug Banks for morning drive. Banks' morning show was later replaced by a local morning show. In 2007, KSJM's local morning show was replaced by Steve Harvey.

In April 2004, Sherman Broadcasting announced they would enter a joint partnership with Carter Broadcast Group (owners of Kansas City urban station KPRS and gospel KPRT). The merger was approved by the FCC three months later.

Though the station was noted for serving a niche audience to the market near Wichita, the station had moderate to low ratings due to the location of its transmitter being situated near Winfield, which is over 50 miles from Wichita.

=== US 107.9 ===
On October 10, 2007, the two companies sold the station to Larry Steckline's AG Network Group due to declining financial revenues.

On January 15, 2008, AG Network flipped KSJM to Country as KWLS "US-107.9." KWLS got its call letters from an AM station in Pratt that was formerly owned by Steckline in the 1980s and 1990s.

In 2017, the station was sold to Mike and Tina Andra of Giddyup Radio, LLC, owners of the Wichita Union Stockyards, for a reported $2.125 million. The station in no way is any longer associated with Steckline.
