= KYSJ =

Radio station in St. Joseph, Missouri

- St. Joseph, Missouri; United States
- Frequency: 1270 kHz
- Branding: KY 102

Programming
- Format: Classic rock

Ownership
- Owner: Eagle Communications, Inc.

History
- First air date: November 7, 1955
- Former call signs: KUSN (1955–1981); KGNM (1981–2020)
- Call sign meaning: St. Joseph (reference to KYYS in Kansas City)

Technical information
- Licensing authority: FCC
- Facility ID: 50511
- Class: D
- Power: 1,000 watts day 36 watts night
- Transmitter coordinates: 39°44′39″N 94°47′16″W
- Translator: 102.5 K273BF (St. Joseph)

Links
- Public license information: Public file; LMS
- Webcast: Listen Live
- Website: KYSJ website

KYSJ (1270 AM) is a commercial radio station broadcasting a classic rock format. It is licensed to St. Joseph, Missouri, and is owned by Eagle Communications, Inc.

By day, KYSJ is powered at 1,000 watts. But to avoid interference to other stations on 1270 AM, power is greatly reduced at night to 36 watts. Programming is heard on FM translator K273BF at 102.5 MHz in St. Joseph. The station uses the FM dial position in its moniker "KY 102".

== History ==
Old station logo

=== KUSN ===
In 1955, Julius B. Spears, an Overland Park, Kansas real estate developer, obtained the construction permit from the Federal Communications Commission. He wanted to build a new AM station in St. Joseph. KUSN went on the air on November 7, 1955, on 1270 kHz with 1,000 watts. But it was a daytime only station, required to go off the air at night.

The initial lineup for the station consisted of Station Manager, Hal Hamilton; Assistant Station Manager and Promotions Director, Don Blue; Women's Programming and traffic manager, Eleanor Shepherd and disc jockeys Jay Bennett, Vic Kearns and Joe Killgore. The transmitter was at the present Leonard Road location, with studios at the historic Hotel Robidoux in downtown St. Joseph. The Robidoux studios were previously used by KFEQ radio, and KVAK (later KAIR in Atchison.) In January 1958, Spears sold the station to Kansas/Iowa broadcast group owners Wyman Schnepp and Fred Reynolds for $50K after being unable to make it financially viable. Schnepp sold the station only a few months later in October 1958 to Charles Norman, a St. Louis-area broadcaster for $90K. The studios moved to the fifth floor of the Howitt Building (also known as the KFEQ building) at 8th and Frederick Avenue, in studios also previously inhabited by KFEQ radio on January 2, 1959. Struggling to make the daytimer financially viable, the station was sold in July 1959 to Midland Broadcasters, a company of Fred Reynolds, who owned the facility until 1977. After the station's application to broadcast after sunset was denied by the FCC in 1960, the station launched an FM counterpart from the Howitt Building location, with 3 kW ERP on 105.1 MHz.

As an AM music format daytimer in the 1960s, the station struggled with ratings and competition from full-time AM, and later FM, stations in the St. Joseph and Kansas City markets. In September 1966, the station moved from a Top 40 sound to a middle of the road (MOR) format of adult music, with some news and sports. In November 1967, it flipped to country music. KUSN-FM simulcast the AM formats during much of the same period and also, for a time, ran a beautiful music format.

While the station was small, it had a strong impact on the market and was the launching pad for the early careers of many major market radio broadcasting personalities, including NBC sportscaster and WABC New York DJ George Michael, Skinny Bobby Harper (often attributed as the inspiration for the Dr. Johnny Fever character on "WKRP in Cincinnati") and Rich "Brother" Robbin (who would work in radio in San Diego and Arizona).

In 1972, the station moved its studios and the FM transmitter to the 2414 South Leonard Road transmitter site due to the Howitt Building studio location scheduled for demolition under the Urban Renewal program. In 1974, KUSN-FM was increased to an ERP of 27,500 watts, new call letters KSFT were assigned, and the station was programmed with the Schulke automated beautiful music format. The station was sold to Hunter Broadcasting Group from Jacksonville, Illinois, in 1977. Upon its sale in 1979 to Orama, the AM and FM combination was split up; the FM was sold to AM competitor KKJO at that time and became KKJO-FM, while KUSN became Christian radio KGNM in 1981 after Orama was acquired by Good News Ministries.

=== KGNM ===
From 1981 until 2013, KGNM was a Christian station. In 2013, Good News Ministries moved the religious programming to 91.1 FM and Orama installed a classic hits format on 1270. In May 2020, Orama agreed to sell KGNM and its translator to Eagle Communications, Inc., owner of St. Joseph's other four commercial stations (KFEQ, KKJO, KESJ, and KSJQ).

=== KYSJ ===
On June 15, 2020, KGNM changed its format to classic rock, branded as "KY 102". The "KY 102" branding was previously on KYYS (102.1 FM) in Kansas City from 1974 to 1997. The sale to Eagle Communications was consummated on September 24, 2020, at a price of $160,000. On October 15, 2020, KGNM changed call letters to KYSJ.
