= KKJO-FM =

Radio station in St. Joseph, Missouri

- St. Joseph, Missouri; United States
- Broadcast area: Northwest Missouri; Northeast Kansas
- Frequency: 105.5 MHz
- Branding: K-Jo 105-5

Programming
- Format: Contemporary hit radio

Ownership
- Owner: Eagle Communications

History
- First air date: September 1, 1962
- Former call signs: KUSN-FM (1960–1974); KSFT (1974–1989)
- Former frequencies: 105.1 MHz (1962–2000)
- Call sign meaning: St. Joseph

Technical information
- Licensing authority: FCC
- Facility ID: 8770
- Class: C1
- ERP: 100,000 watts
- HAAT: 299 meters (981 ft)
- Transmitter coordinates: 39.7097°N 95.0427°W

Links
- Public license information: Public file; LMS
- Webcast: Listen live
- Website: kjo1055.com

KKJO-FM (105.5 MHz) is a commercial radio station licensed to St. Joseph, Missouri, United States. It airs a contemporary hit radio format known as "K-Jo 105-5". It is owned by Eagle Communications, with studios and offices on Country Lane in St. Joseph.

The transmitter is on Ottumwa Road at 140th Road, southwest of Wathena, Kansas.

== History ==
=== KKJO-AM ===
An AM radio station in St. Joseph, with the call sign KRES, signed on the air on June 7, 1946. It broadcast at 1230 kilocycles and was powered at 250 watts. The KRES call letters were derived from last names of the four original station owners: local attorney/financier Basil Kaufmann, sportscaster Paul Roscoe, liquor distributor Joseph Epsten and pharmacist Al Shanin. Roscoe was the first station manager. The studios were located on the 2nd floor of the Commerce Loan Company, also owned by Kaufmann, at 7th and Edmond Streets in downtown St. Joseph. The transmitter was located on the Belt Highway near Pear Street. Dward A. Moore was the station's first program director. One of the first regularly scheduled programs on the station was a daily performance by Minor Clites, a blind piano player who lived in Saint Joseph.

In November 1951, the FCC authorized the station move to 1550 kHz with increased power of 5,000 watts. The KKJO call letters were adopted in 1961, and KRES today is used by a country station in Moberly, Missouri. The owner at the time was George Marti, a Texas broadcasting equipment manufacturer. While the KKJO call sign was a convenient reference to "St. Joe", in an interview published in Broadcasting magazine, Marti revealed that the actual choice of the call letters was an acknowledgement to his wife, Jo. The middle of the road (MOR) format was dropped in 1965 for Top 40. On air staff, in 1965, included Greg Everett, (program director), Mike Shannon, Roger Litz (News), and Jim Ream (weekends/vacation fill in) Calling the station "Tiger Radio," KKJO was St. Joseph's version of Top 40 radio similar to the pioneering sound at nearby WHB in Kansas City. As the 1970s passed, KKJO switched to an oldies format. In the 80s, it acquired more sports and talk programming.

=== 1960-1989: KUSN-FM ===
The FM counterpart to KKJO, originally at 105.1 MHz, debuted on September 1, 1962. KUSN-FM simulcast Top 40 hits with KUSN at 1270 kHz. In the wake of KKJO's success, KUSN-AM-FM switched to an easy listening format in 1966 and later to a modern country music format in 1967.

KUSN-FM's call letters were changed to KSFT (K-Soft) in 1974 to reflect a new automated beautiful music format provided by Schulke, a syndication company. The FM station's power was increased from 3,000 watts to 27,500 watts. KSFT also began broadcasting in FM stereo. In 1977, KSFT ended its beautiful music sound. The station became "T-105" and began an automated Top 40 format. It moved to Album-Oriented Rock (AOR) in 1978, and, when it was acquired from KUSN in 1979, was switched to country.

=== 1989-2000: KKJO "K-Jo 105" ===
KKJO swapped frequencies with KSFT on March 1, 1989, moving the country format to the AM, and KKJO (K-JO 105) shifted to Top 40/CHR. In 1992, in the wake of the growing presence of rhythmic tracks on Top-40, KKJO became hot adult contemporary, while KSFT 1270 started broadcasting satellite formats, first adult standards and later oldies. KKJO would switch to all-Christmas music in the final weeks of the year, approaching December 25.

=== 2000-Present KKJO "K-Jo 105-5" ===
On April 24, 2000, at 6 a.m., KKJO moved up the dial to 105.5 FM. This was done to allow Susquehanna Broadcasting to start a station at 105.1 in the Kansas City radio market. That station became '80s hits KFME, and is now contemporary hit radio KCJK, owned by Cumulus Media.

KKJO's last song played on 105.1 was also the first song the station played in 1989, "We Built This City" by Starship. The first song after the move to 105.5 was "Everything You Want" by Vertical Horizon.

On May 21, 2011, KKJO played "It's The End of the World As We Know It (And I Feel Fine)" by R.E.M. on a loop for several hours as a stunt related to the end times prediction by evangelist Harold Camping of Family Radio.

Today, KKJO has evolved back to a Top 40 (CHR) format. KKJO is currently programmed by Travis Dodge.
