= WHB =

- Kansas City, Missouri; United States
- Broadcast area: Kansas City metropolitan area
- Frequency: 810 kHz
- Branding: Sports Radio 810 WHB

Programming
- Format: Sports
- Network: ESPN Radio
- Affiliations: Kansas Jayhawks; Kansas City Current; Motor Racing Network; Sporting KC; Westwood One Sports

Ownership
- Owner: Union Broadcasting, Inc.
- Sister stations: KCTE; KKGQ; WHBE; WHBE-FM; WLCL

History
- First air date: May 10, 1922; 104 years ago
- Former frequencies: 710 kHz (1947–1998)
- Call sign meaning: Randomly assigned by the Department of Commerce

Technical information
- Licensing authority: FCC
- Facility ID: 6384
- Class: B
- Power: 50,000 watts day; 5,000 watts night
- Transmitter coordinates: 39°18′21″N 94°34′30.8″W
- Translator: 103.7 K279BI (Kansas City)
- Repeater: 101.1 KCFX-HD4 (Harrisonville)

Links
- Public license information: Public file; LMS
- Webcast: Listen live
- Website: www.810whb.com

WHB (810 AM) is a commercial radio station in Kansas City, Missouri, airing an all-sports radio format. Its studios are on West 121st Street in Overland Park, Kansas, also the headquarters of its owner, Union Broadcasting. For most of the 1950s through the 1970s, while it was broadcasting at 710 AM, WHB was one of the nation's most influential Top 40 outlets.

WHB is an affiliate of ESPN Radio. It also carries play-by-play games of Sporting Kansas City, the Kansas Jayhawks, UMKC Kangaroos athletics, and the Kansas City Mavericks of the ECHL. Union Broadcasting also owns KCTE, another all-sports station in the Kansas City metropolitan area. KCTE primarily carries ESPN Radio programming while WHB mainly airs local sports shows during the day. KCTE also carries some sporting events that WHB is unable to air due to other commitments.

By day, WHB operates at 50,000 watts, the maximum for AM stations. It uses a non-directional antenna. However, because AM 810 is a clear-channel frequency reserved for Class A stations KSFO in San Francisco and WGY in Schenectady, New York, at night WHB reduces power to 5,000 watts. It switches to a directional antenna with a five-tower array. The towers are off Northeast Cookingham Drive in the Nashua neighborhood of Northland, Kansas City, adjacent to Interstate 435. Programming is also heard on 250-watt FM translator K279BI at 103.7 MHz.

The station is noted for its large coverage area, as WHB can be heard as far north as the southern fringe of South Dakota, as far east as the Quad Cities, as far west as Garden City, Kansas, and as far south as Fayetteville, Arkansas. City-grade coverage can be achieved as far north as southwestern Iowa. It is the primary entry point station for Kansas and western Missouri in the Emergency Alert System.

== History ==
=== Early broadcasting years (1922–1954) ===
Established by Sam Adair and John T. Schilling, WHB started experimental broadcasts on April 10, 1922. It used the frequency 833 kHz. WHB is one of Kansas City's oldest radio stations, second only to KCSP which premiered on February 16 of that year, as WDAF. In the early days of radio broadcasting, the dividing line between call signs beginning with a "W" and those beginning with a "K" was at the western border of Kansas (today, the dividing line is the Mississippi River), which is the reason WHB is one of only a few stations in Missouri whose call letters start with a "W". Originally owned by the Sweeney Automobile School, the Cook Paint and Varnish Company purchased the station in 1930. The station jumped between 730 kHz and 850 kHz (860 kHz in 1938) before 1946, when the Federal Communications Commission (FCC) authorized the station to broadcast at 710 kHz.

The station published a quarterly magazine called Swing, keeping readers up to date with the Kansas City music scene, which had waned in the wake of the Pendergast Machine's downfall and World War II.

While owned by Cook, WHB expanded briefly into FM radio and television. It constructed a sister station, WHB-FM. In 1948, it began simulcasting WHB on the frequency 102.1 MHz. But management saw little opportunity for the station to become profitable and the station was taken dark in 1950. Today, 102.1 FM is KCKC, owned by Steel City Media. WHB was also involved in putting Channel 9 on the air in 1953, a joint venture with Midland Broadcasting. Today that station is KMBC-TV, owned by Hearst Television.

=== Todd Storz and "SEVENTY-ONEderful" (1954–1985) ===
Omaha entrepreneur Todd Storz and his Mid-Continent Broadcasting Company purchased WHB from Cook on June 10, 1954. Building on his successful attempts at increasing listenership at KOWH in Omaha and WTIX in New Orleans, Storz discontinued WHB's network programming and introduced a Top 40 format. WHB became the first station in the country to play Top 40 music 24 hours a day, and it became an instant hit in Kansas City, becoming the most popular station by the end of the year.

With 10,000 watts in the daytime, WHB became one of the most powerful Top 40 stations in North America, attracting programming directors and station owners from across the country to observe Storz's operations. One observer was Gordon McLendon, who went back to Dallas and introduced his version of Top 40 radio at KLIF. Rick Sklar also heard WHB and adapted elements of its format to build the Top 40 format in New York City. WABC became the most listened to radio station in North America during the 1970s. There is another New York connection. Ruth Meyer worked at WHB in the late 1950s, and went on to become the program director of WMCA, leading that station to the position of #1 pop music station in New York between 1963 and 1966.

Storz cultivated listenership numbers by one of his treasure hunts. One day in 1955, WHB broadcast clues telling listeners where they might find a prize worth $1,000. After leading listeners throughout the metropolitan area, the final clue resulted in traffic tie-ups outside Loose Park as listeners tried to be the first to find the station's logo painted on the back of a turtle. Although listenership soared to as much as 50 percent, Kansas City police chief Bernard Brannon suggested in the June 4, 1956, issue of Time magazine that Storz's treasure hunts should be banned. Storz continued to operate daily, weekly, and monthly cash promotions to maintain listenership.

WHB also was a pioneer in the talk radio format with the late-night program "NiteBeat". Using a multi-line system invented by WHB engineer Dale Moody, disc jockeys and hosts could field calls from across the Midwest as guests from all walks of life visited the studio. WHB also kept listeners informed with "News at 55" (at 55 minutes past each hour). That was followed by a world time check at the top of every hour, which the station claimed to be accurate "to 1/20000 of a second". In the 1950s, Moody also fashioned a unique programming idea for WHB during the overnight hours, "Silent Sam, the All-night Deejay Man". It was actually a jukebox programmed to play records one-after-another with a jingle and a pre-recorded public-service announcement broadcast every 15 minutes. As such, Moody is considered a pioneer in broadcast automation.

=== "Yours truly, WHB" ===
WHB used the melodic and catchy PAMS jingles to remind listeners which radio station they were hearing. Those jingles sometimes referred to WHB as the "World's Happiest Broadcasters" and "World's Hottest Broadcasters". The station limited the number of commercials per hour and maintained a tight playlist limited to only the biggest Top 40 hits.

WHB's popularity increased as songs on the Top 40 began to include rock and roll hits by Elvis Presley, Bobby Darin, and The Beatles. Months after the Beatles landed in the United States, Todd Storz died of a stroke at age 39. Despite Storz's death, WHB remained on top, as prolific DJs including Gene Woody, Johnny Dolan and Phil Jay commanded the WHB Air Force. As late as 1981, WHB's ratings remained in the double digits.

=== Decline of AM music ===
WHB, however, could not fend off the increasing competition from FM radio. Starting in 1973 with KBEQ-FM, WHB's listenership declined as more Kansas Citians listened to their favorite hits in FM stereo and with less interference common to AM broadcasting. While KBEQ and KUDL transitioned from their AM to FM frequencies, WHB never acquired an FM outlet, after giving up 102.1 FM in 1950. Ironically, the previous owners of WHB and KXOK in St. Louis were listed in 1950 as holding FM licenses: WHB-FM at 102.1 MHz and KXOK-FM at 94.7 MHz. However, both stations were sold before FM became a leading radio force. By the mid-1970s, these frequencies would become homes to KYYS (Kansas City) and KSHE (St. Louis), each filling the air with 100,000 watts of album-based progressive rock music.

=== Oldies (1985–1993) ===
In 1985, Storz Broadcasting, then led by Todd's father Robert, sold WHB to Shamrock Broadcasting, a group led by Roy Disney. WHB discontinued Top-40 in favor of an oldies format, capitalizing on the playlists the station had maintained in the past. In 1989, KCMO-FM became "Oldies 95" and quickly won over former WHB listeners. Once commanding 50% of Kansas City's 1.1 million radio listeners, WHB only attained a 1.2 rating in the winter of 1990.

=== "The Farm" (1993–1999) ===
Shamrock leased WHB in 1993 to Apollo Communications, who owned KMXV and KUDL at the time. Upon buying the station on September 24, Apollo sold the station to Kanza Communications of Carrollton, Missouri, with Mike Carter as President. Kanza announced they would flip WHB to a country music/farm format that was programmed on KMZU in Carrollton and KTRX in Tarkio on WHB. During the final days of the oldies format on WHB, the station aired promos directing listeners to KCMO-FM, who flipped to oldies in 1989. WHB made the switch to the new format on September 28. Dan Diamond, a lifelong friend of the Carter family, aired a Saturday morning request show and Wayne Combs headed up the News Department at WHB. A frequency swap with talk radio station KCMO on October 8, 1997, gave WHB one of the largest daytime coverage areas in the Midwest, providing at least secondary coverage to almost half of Missouri, almost half of Kansas (as far west as the Wichita suburbs), along with large slices of Nebraska and Iowa. Due to the way the frequency swap was structured, the FCC considers KCMO to have changed its call sign to WHB and the other way around.

=== Today: "Sportsradio" ===
In September 1999, Union Broadcasting purchased WHB from Kanza for $8 million, considered a high price for an AM radio station. Union Broadcasting was owned by banker Jerry Green, former Royals players Jeff Montgomery and Brian McRae, broadcasters Kevin Kietzman and Duke Frye, and Chad Boeger, owner of sports station KCTE in Independence, Missouri. Because KCTE could only broadcast in the daytime, Union transferred much of the sports radio format, including sports updates from ESPN Radio and games from the Westwood One radio network, to WHB. The new sports format launched on WHB at midnight on October 1, 1999.

In response, Entercom moved WDAF to FM in 2003 to make way for a rival sports station, KCSP. Jason Whitlock, Bill Maas, and Tim Grunhard, who were a part of the first years of WHB programming, were hired by KCSP. Soren Petro joined WHB in January 2004 after KMBZ ended its sports talk programming and moved it to KCSP.

WHB picked up broadcasting rights to Kansas City Royals baseball games in 2003, allowing its Arbitron ratings share to peak in the spring at 4.0. In 2007, WHB withdrew its bid to renew the rights and Entercom began broadcasting Royals games on KCSP in 2008. Even when the Royals were not playing, WHB's audience was smaller than KCSP. Between the Lines, hosted by Kevin Kietzman (former WDAF-TV sportscaster), from 2 to 7 PM, ranks among the top-rated sports shows in the city. Soren Petro hosts The Program from 10 AM to 2 PM. A mid-morning show, Crunch Time (9-11 AM), was originally hosted by Maas, Grunhard and Frank Boal until the first two broadcasters defected, leaving Boal to carry on with a series of rotating co-hosts, including Dave Stewart (also of Metro Sports and formerly of KMBC), George Brett, Kevin Harlan (CBS Sports), Lynn Dickey, and Joe Randa. Stewart took over the reins as primary host upon Boal's forced retirement in 2008, but the show was cancelled a few months later. Boal and Harlan continue to make regular weekly appearances on the remaining three scheduled shows. The morning drive time show, The Border Patrol, originally began with co-hosts Steven St. John and "Bulldog" Bob Fescoe. The premise emphasizes the border rivalry between the universities of Missouri and Kansas (St. John is a stalwart Missouri fan, while Fescoe is a KU alum). Fescoe left WHB in 2007 for St. Louis sports station 590 KFNS, and was replaced by Nate Bukaty (also a KU alum). Fescoe returned to the Kansas City market on rival KCSP in January 2009 to battle the Border Patrol with his own show, Fescoe in the Morning.

WHB carried Kansas City Brigade arena football games in 2006 and 2007. On January 4, 2007, sister station 97.3 FM KCXM became a full-time affiliate of ESPN Radio, allowing WHB to focus more on local sports talk. Days later, the family of Jerry Green, the majority shareholder in Union Broadcasting, filed suit against Boeger and Union Broadcasting, for the switch to sports talk on KCXM. Green, whose health had been declining, eventually sold his interest in Union Broadcasting and died on August 15, 2007, at the age of 77.

On December 1, 2007, WHB assumed the full ESPN Radio lineup when KCXM was sold to Educational Media Foundation, which operates the K-LOVE brand of contemporary Christian radio stations and changed KCXM to that format as KLRX. Due to the change of ownership on FM and the signal restrictions on AM, Union chose not to renew the Royals radio contract. The current Royals flagship station is KCSP, which held the rights for some years in the 1990s as WDAF.

During the 2014 and 2015 MLB postseason, WHB and KCSP aired simultaneous broadcasts of Royals games. WHB aired the ESPN Radio feed, while KCSP aired the Royals Radio Network. feed. Under Major League Baseball broadcast rules, KCSP was the only terrestrial station allowed to broadcast the Royals Radio Network feed; all other stations on the network (including former flagship WIBW in Topeka) had to carry the ESPN Radio feed.

WHB is currently the Kansas City radio home of Kansas Jayhawks football and men's basketball, and carries the weekly "Hawk Talk" program with coaches Bill Self and Lance Leipold.

On December 11, 2024, WHB began airing on 103.7 K279BI. This gave them presence on the FM dial to compete with KFNZ-FM. K279BI is a translator owned by Cumulus Media that is being leased by Union Broadcasting.

== Regular contributors ==
- Gary Barnett - former college football coach at Northwestern and Colorado
- Tim Grunhard - former center for the Kansas City Chiefs
- Mike MacFarlane - former catcher for the Kansas City Royals

== Notable former staff ==
- Bob Arbogast
- Walt Bodine
- Chickenman

== See also ==
- List of initial AM-band station grants in the United States
- List of three-letter broadcast call signs in the United States
