= KFKF-FM =

Country music radio station in Kansas City

Coordinates: 39.016°N 94.507°W

- Kansas City, Kansas; United States
- Broadcast area: Kansas City metropolitan area
- Frequency: 94.1 MHz
- Branding: Country 94.1 KFKF

Programming
- Language: English
- Format: Country music

Ownership
- Owner: Steel City Media; (MGTF Media Company, LLC)
- Sister stations: KBEQ; KCKC; KMXV

History
- First air date: May 28, 1963
- Former call signs: KCKN-FM (1963–1982)

Technical information
- Licensing authority: FCC
- Facility ID: 34431
- Class: C0
- ERP: 100,000 watts
- HAAT: 303 meters (994 ft)

Links
- Public license information: Public file; LMS
- Webcast: Listen Live
- Website: www.kfkf.com

KFKF-FM (94.1 FM) is a commercial radio station licensed to Kansas City, Kansas. It is owned by Steel City Media and airs a country music format. The studios and offices are on Pennsylvania Avenue at Westport Center in Midtown Kansas City, Missouri.

KFKF-FM has an effective radiated power (ERP) of 100,000 watts. The transmitter site is off East 63rd Street in Kansas City, Missouri, near Interstate 435.

== History ==
=== Early years as KCKN-FM ===
The station has been playing country music since it signed on the air on May 23, 1963. KCKN-FM was a simulcast of its AM counterpart, KCKN (1340 AM, now KDTD). The two stations were owned by Cy Blumenthal and the call sign represented Kansas City, Kansas. KCKN-FM was originally powered at 20,000 watts.

In 1965, KCKN-AM-FM was acquired by Kaye-Smith Broadcasting, which owned a number of stations in sizable markets, mostly in the West. By the 1970s, KCKN-FM's power was boosted to the current 100,000 watts, but the tower was only 460 feet tall, less than half its current height.

=== Switch to KFKF-FM ===
The simulcast ended in January 1982, when the AM station became KRKR, a mostly automated album rock station, while the FM station adopted the current KFKF-FM call letters. At first, it was Kansas City's only full-powered FM country station, though they would be in heavy competition with 610 WDAF's personality country format, which remained the top rated country outlet, years after many other AM country stations around the U.S. had switched formats.

Sconnix Broadcasting acquired KFKF in 1990. In 1993, KFKF gained an FM competitor, when KBEQ switched from contemporary hit radio to a younger-targeting country format.

In 1998, the station played its 4 millionth country song, Friends in Low Places by Garth Brooks.

=== Ownership changes ===
EZ Communications bought KFKF in 1995, then American Radio Systems in April 1997, and then Westinghouse/CBS in September. In June 1998, CBS split off the radio division under the revived Infinity Broadcasting name, which would be renamed CBS Radio in December 2005. In November 2006, Wilks Broadcasting purchased the station from CBS. Upon taking over the station, Wilks cut many long time staffers, including midday DJ Rusty Walker, night DJ Tim Peters, morning newscaster Randy Birch, and overnight host Joy.

Under Infinity ownership, KFKF became co-owned with its chief FM country competitor, KBEQ. KBEQ continued to aim at younger country fans, while KFKF appealed to more middle-aged listeners. In 2003, WDAF switched from AM 610 to FM 106.5, as the AM frequency flipped to sports talk as KCSP. The move gave Kansas City three country music stations on FM.

In 2011, with the market not having any adult contemporary stations airing full-time Christmas music (sister station KCKC flipped to album adult alternative, and KUDL flipped to a simulcast of KMBZ), Wilks announced that the station, for the first time in its history, would air round-the-clock Christmas music beginning November 25, 2011. The station started playing Christmas music again beginning November 20, 2012. However, when KCKC reverted to AC (and resumed their tradition of airing Christmas music during the holiday season) in 2014, KFKF stopped airing Christmas music.

KFKF Logo until 2005

On June 12, 2014, Wilks announced that it was selling its Kansas City cluster, including KFKF, to Pittsburgh-based Steel City Media. The sale was approved on September 26, and was consummated on September 30.
