= KCTE =

Radio station in Independence, Missouri

- Independence, Missouri; United States
- Broadcast area: Kansas City Metropolitan Area
- Frequency: 1510 kHz
- Branding: ESPN Kansas City 1510 AM and 94.5 FM

Programming
- Format: Sports
- Affiliations: Infinity Sports Network; ESPN Radio

Ownership
- Owner: Union Broadcasting
- Sister stations: WHB

History
- First air date: 1947
- Former call signs: KIMO (1947–1962); KCCV (1962–1989); KIDZ (1989–1993); KJLA (1993–1994)
- Call sign meaning: Kansas City's Team

Technical information
- Licensing authority: FCC
- Facility ID: 64637
- Class: D
- Power: 10,000 watts (days only)
- Transmitter coordinates: 39°4′14″N 94°26′58″W
- Translator: 94.5 K233DM (Raytown)

Links
- Public license information: Public file; LMS
- Webcast: Listen live
- Website: 1510.com

KCTE (1510 AM) is a commercial radio station licensed to Independence, Missouri, United States, and serving the Kansas City metropolitan area operates during the daytime hours only. Owned by Union Broadcasting, it features a sports radio format in conjunction with co-owned WHB. The studios are on West 121st Street in Overland Park.

KCTE's transmitter is sited off of Appleton Avenue at East 28th Street. Programming is heard around the clock on low-power FM translator K233DM on 94.5 MHz.

== History ==
The station signed on the air in 1947. The original call sign was KIMO, originally broadcasting with 250 watts on 1010 kilocycles. It has always been a daytime-only station. It later moved to 1510 kHz.

It was acquired in 1962 by Richard Bott and became the first of many Christian radio stations in his Bott Radio Network. The call letters were changed to KCCV (Kansas City's Christian Voice). In 1990, Bott it moved to a new frequency licensed for 24-hour broadcasting. Over the next several years, 1510 played rhythm and blues, oldies and later adult standards.

In 1994, new owners acquired the station and debuted KCTE (Spelling KC-Team), Kansas City's first sports talk station. Throughout the 1990s, KCTE grew in popularity, yet was constrained by the daytime-only operation. With the aid of Union Bank president Jerry Green, KCTE purchased the 50,000-watt WHB and moved its sports operations onto the 810 frequency on October 1, 1999.

After stints as a Latin music and later an alternative rock station (playing a repeating two-hour tape loop), a Hot Talk format debuted in 2001. KCTE's programming included Don Imus's morning show, Dennis Miller's talk show, and local shows hosted by personalities from KMBC-TV. The station also carried a large portion of ESPN Radio programming until that moved to sister station 97.3 KCXM. In 2007, KCXM was sold to a Christian broadcaster. ESPN network shows returned to 1510 KCTE, which resumed full-time sports programming.
