= KLRX =

K-Love radio station in Lee's Summit, Missouri

Coordinates: 39.091°N 94.472°W

- Lee's Summit, Missouri; United States
- Broadcast area: Kansas City Metropolitan Area
- Frequency: 97.3 MHz
- Branding: K-LOVE

Programming
- Format: Contemporary Christian

Ownership
- Owner: Educational Media Foundation

History
- First air date: April 6, 1998 (as KCSX)
- Former call signs: KCSX (1998–2003); KZPL (2003–2005); KCXM (2005–2007)

Technical information
- Licensing authority: FCC
- Facility ID: 4933
- Class: C1
- ERP: 55,000 watts
- HAAT: 357 meters (1,171 ft)

Links
- Public license information: Public file; LMS
- Webcast: Listen Live!
- Website: klove.com

KLRX (97.3 FM; "K-Love") is a radio station in the Kansas City, Missouri-Kansas City, Kansas area that plays contemporary Christian music. The station is licensed to Lee's Summit, and broadcasts at 55,000 watts with a transmitter located in east Kansas City, Missouri.

== History ==
=== KCSX (1998–2003) ===
KCSX was originally based in Moberly, Missouri, and featured a country music format. It was known at the time as "97.3 KICKS-FM", and was owned by Best Broadcasting, Inc., part of the Best Broadcast Group. Shortly after the station signed on the air with 25,000 watts of power, Best Broadcasting entered into an agreement to sell the station to First Broadcasting. That agreement was contingent on Best Broadcasting and First Broadcasting working together and obtaining FCC approval to relocate KCSX to the Kansas City market area and relicense the station to Lee's Summit. The relocation involved a total of 13 other stations that either changed frequencies, tower locations or some other change to existing operations. KCSX remained on the air with its country format until January 2003, when the station signed off the air and relocated to the Kansas City market. Some of the other stations that were involved in the relocation of KCSX were KRLI in Malta Bend, KCHI-FM in Chillicothe, Topeka, Kansas-based WIBW-FM, Junction City, Kansas station KJCK-FM, and several others. First Broadcasting had no actual ownership of 97.3 until the sale agreement with Best Broadcasting was consummated. A short time later, the involvement with Union Broadcasting was officially made public.

=== KZPL "The Planet" (2003–2005) ===
On January 20, 2003, the station dropped its country music format and began stunting by playing nothing but songs by The Beatles for one week, followed by similar daylong marathons of music from The Rolling Stones, Led Zeppelin, U2, Aerosmith, Van Halen, and Metallica. At Midnight on February 10, the new adult album alternative format known as "The Planet" debuted, with "The World I Know" by Collective Soul being the first song played. For the first month, all programming was fed via satellite from Dallas. Dubbed as "World Class Rock", KZPL gathered a small yet devoted following. However, it sat consistently near the bottom of most ratings charts throughout its two-year existence, namely due to numerous format tweaks. The station was a primary sponsor of the Wakarusa Music and Camping Festival in its initial years when based in nearby Lawrence, Kansas.

In Spring 2003, arguments between both ownership companies resulted in First Broadcasting taking Union Broadcasting to court, eventually leading to the full sale of the station to Union. The station served as the FM affiliate for the Kansas City Royals starting with the 2004 season, sharing duties with sister station WHB. KZPL aired games that began at 6:00 p.m. or later, when WHB's AM signal was harder to pick up.

Several of the programs and air personalities who aired on The Planet are now on similarly formatted KTBG.

=== KCXM "MAX-FM" (2005–2007) ===
On September 16, 2005, after playing "Last Goodbye" by Jeff Buckley, KZPL flipped to Album Rock as "97-3 Max FM", which started with "For Those About to Rock (We Salute You)" by AC/DC. The letters KCXM were implemented November 2, 2005. Since its sign-on, "Max FM" used the "Everything That Rocks" slogan. A few days after the sign-on, rival classic rocker KYYS began using exactly the same slogan, but quickly phased it out. KCXM was registered with Arbiton to use the slogan. As a rock station, KCXM never garnered the ratings Union had hoped for, and also struggled to make money. Shortly after the format change, program director Bryan Truta announced he was leaving for rival station KCJK.

"Max FM" competed against longtime FM rock stations KQRC, KYYS and KCFX. Kansas City native Erich "Mancow" Muller's Chicago-based morning show, Mancow's Morning Madhouse, aired weekdays from 5 a.m. to 10 a.m. The station added DJs in September 2006 as part of the celebration of the station being on air for one year. Murphy Wells (formerly of KQRC) did middays, Kenny Holland and Ozone did afternoons as "KAOS", and Scooter did nights. The station also added the syndicated program "Rockline" and retained "Little Steven's Underground Garage" from its AAA days. The station continued to air evening games of the Kansas City Royals until Union's contract expired and games moved to KCSP (AM).

=== "ESPN Radio 97.3" (2007) ===
On January 4, 2007, after playing "Selling the Drama" by Live, KCXM dropped the rock format and became "ESPN Radio 97.3," a full-time affiliate of ESPN Radio. The station dropped most local hosts at this time, but continued to air local games and play by play. KCXM complimented its sister station, WHB, which carries a mostly local sports talk format.

=== KLRX "K-Love" (2007–present) ===
On November 30, 2007, KCXM was sold to EMF Broadcasting for $16 million. At midnight on December 1, 2007, KCXM began broadcasting K-LOVE programming. Just before the launch of K-LOVE, 97.3 reverted to its AAA format as "The Planet" for a few hours, hosted by a former station DJ, Jason Justice. At midnight proper, after Justice gave a final sign-off message and signed off the micro-format, and effectively the station's live commercial run (as EMF converts all incoming affiliates to non-commercial status), with "Come to Jesus" by Mindy Smith, the move to K-Love took place, with the first song under the brand being "Everything Glorious" by the David Crowder Band.

On December 20, 2007, KCXM changed its callsign to KLRX, completing the transition. However, KLRX aired several sports events after the change to K-LOVE: a college basketball game between Kansas State and Oklahoma and at least one UMKC basketball game. It is likely that these games were "farmed out" from WHB, due to a schedule conflict. Once the sale was completed, the station ceased airing sporting events. EMF Broadcasting has its Kansas City office on the first floor of the Union Broadcasting Building in Overland Park, Kansas.
