= Scott Mayman =

Australian radio presenter

Scott Mayman is an Australian television and radio presenter. He has worked extensively in Australia and in the United States and has won a number of awards, including the best presenter award at the Gold Coast Media Awards.

== Early life ==
Mayman was born in 1969 in Australia.

== Career ==
Mayman began his career in Brisbane.

From 1985 to 1998, Mayman worked at various radio and TV stations in Australia. In 1998, he moved to the United States, where he worked for CBS Radio News for 24 years. He also operated the KCMO-AM newsroom in Kansas City, Missouri as a news director.

In 2005, after a car accident, Mayman moved back to Australia. He remained an Australian correspondent for CBS until he switched to ABC News.

From 2010 to 2014, he was a news director at Radio 4BC Brisbane. He is also former breakfast show host for FM104.1 Gold Coast, and Radio 97. In 2023, he joined the Australian Independent Radio News team.

As of September 2025, Mayman reads news for 2CC Canberra and 6iX Perth, operates the 4BC/101FM "ready reserve" program, works as an Australian correspondent for ABC News and NPR in the US, and is an opinion panellist with Sky News Australia. He is also an aviation writer for the Canberra City News publication.

== Awards and honours ==
Mayman has won a number of awards, including for:

- "Best Presenter Award" at the Gold Coast Media Awards in 2006;
- "Best Radio News Story" at the Gold Coast Media Awards in 2008 for Afternoons, "Night Watch";
- "Best Radio News Story" at the Gold Coast Media Awards in 2009 for Afternoons, "Qantas out of the Gold Coast".

== Personal life ==
In 2024, while travelling back to Australia after covering the 23rd anniversary of the September 11 attacks in New York City, Scott had a medical emergency at Sydney Airport while changing gates, Qantas staff attended to Mayman while waiting for the ambulance to arrive.
