= KMZU =

Radio station in Carrollton, Missouri

- Carrollton, Missouri; United States
- Broadcast area: Kansas City, Missouri
- Frequency: 100.7 MHz
- Branding: The Farm

Programming
- Format: Country

Ownership
- Owner: Miles Carter; (Carter Media LLC)
- Sister stations: KRLI, KROL

History
- First air date: July 13, 1962 (as KAOL at 101.1)
- Former call signs: KAOL (1962–1982)
- Former frequencies: 101.1 MHz (1962–1990)

Technical information
- Licensing authority: FCC
- Facility ID: 33386
- Class: C1
- ERP: 99,000 watts
- HAAT: 302 meters (990 feet)
- Transmitter coordinates: 39°21′59″N 93°24′12″W

Links
- Public license information: Public file; LMS
- Webcast: Listen live
- Website: kmzu.com

KMZU (100.7 FM) is a radio station broadcasting a country music format. Licensed to Carrollton, Missouri, United States. The station is currently owned by Carter Media LLC.

On September 8, 1990, KMZU swapped frequencies with KCFX. At that time, KMZU moved from 101.1 FM to 100.7 FM.
