= Bob Gretz =

American sportswriter and broadcaster

Bob Gretz is an American sportswriter and broadcaster. Gretz began covering sports in his hometown of Punxsutawney, Pennsylvania for The Punxsutawney Spirit newspaper. He moved on to Johnstown, Pennsylvania, where he worked for The Tribune-Democrat and covered the Pittsburgh Steelers on a daily basis. In 1981 Gretz started covering the Kansas City Chiefs as the Kansas City Star beat writer. His writing has been honored by the Associated Press Sports Editors (APSE) and the Pro Football Writers of America (PFWA). He joined the Chiefs Radio Network broadcast team in 1990 and was the pre-game host and sideline reporter until 2008. He is also the Kansas City representative on the Pro Football Hall of Fame selection committee. He graduated from Point Park College. He now has his own website, bobgretz.com, that covers the Chiefs, the NFL and the NFL draft each year.
