= KRLI =

- Malta Bend, Missouri; United States
- Broadcast area: Kansas City, Missouri
- Frequency: 103.9 MHz
- Branding: KRLI Country

Programming
- Format: Classic Country

Ownership
- Owner: Miles Carter; (Carter Media LLC)
- Sister stations: KROL, KMZU

Technical information
- Licensing authority: FCC
- Facility ID: 42384
- Class: C2
- ERP: 12,000 watts
- HAAT: 284 meters
- Transmitter coordinates: 39°21′59″N 93°24′12″W

Links
- Public license information: Public file; LMS
- Webcast: Listen live
- Website: krlicountry.com

KRLI (103.9 FM) is a radio station broadcasting a Classic Country format. Licensed to Malta Bend, Missouri, United States, the station is currently owned by Miles Carter, through licensee Carter Media LLC.

During the 2000s, the station carried a Middle of the Road/Oldies format. In June 2012, the station changed from Adult Standards to Contemporary Hit Radio and branded itself "103.9 The Grenade". On June 16, 2013, KRLI changed their format from Contemporary Hit Radio to Classic country.
