= KROL =

- Carrollton, Missouri; United States
- Frequency: 1430 kHz
- Branding: The Best In News Talk and Classic Rock

Programming
- Format: CHR
- Affiliations: ABC Radio; Westwood One

Ownership
- Owner: Miles Carter; (Carter Media LLC)
- Sister stations: KRLI

History
- First air date: April 18, 1959
- Former call signs: KAOL (1959–2019)

Technical information
- Licensing authority: FCC
- Facility ID: 33387
- Class: D
- Power: 500 watts day 27 watts night
- Transmitter coordinates: 39°19′58.00″N 93°32′15.00″W
- Translator: 101.3 K267BN (Bosworth)

Links
- Public license information: Public file; LMS
- Webcast: Listen live
- Website: krolradio.com

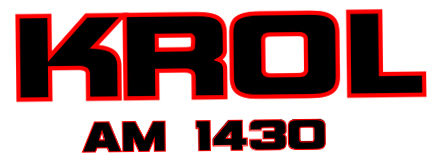

KROL (1430 AM) is a radio station which recently changed from classic country to a CHR format. It is licensed to Carrollton, Missouri, United States. The station is currently owned by Miles Carter, through licensee Carter Media LLC. KROL is re-broadcast by an FM translator (K267BN, Bosworth, Missouri, 101.3 MHz).

On June 16, 2013, the then-KAOL changed their format from classic country to Contemporary Hit Radio (as "The Grenade"). Classic country moved to sister station KRLI 103.9 FM (Malta Bend, Missouri), which had started with a nostalgia/variety format and later switched to Contemporary Hit Radio.

KAOL had previously run a sports format until May 2011.
