= Kansas City Kansan =

- Type: News site
- Format: Web-only (formerly broadsheet)
- Owner(s): Nick Sloan
- Publisher: Nick Sloan
- Founded: 1921
- Headquarters: 7735 Washington Avenue; Kansas City, Kansas 66112; United States
- Website: www.kckansan.com

The Kansas City Kansan is an online newspaper that serves Kansas City and other communities in Wyandotte County, Kansas, United States.

== History ==
Arthur Capper started the newspaper on January 31, 1921, when Kansas City, Kansas, did not have a daily newspaper while neighboring Kansas City, Missouri, had three dailies—the Kansas City Journal-Post, Kansas City Times and Kansas City Star.

At its peak in the 1960s, the daily paid circulation topped 34,000. It also operated KCKN radio between 1936 and 1957.

It was published daily except Sundays, Mondays and major holidays. Towards the end of its print publication, the paper converted from a daily to a twice-weekly publication. Since January 10, 2009, the Kansan has been an online-only publication.

On September 19, 2009, Nick Sloan, a resident of Kansas City, Kansas, purchased the Kansan and is now the independent owner of the publication.
