= KPRS =

Radio station in Kansas City, Missouri

Coordinates: 39°00′57″N 94°30′24″W

- Kansas City, Missouri; United States
- Broadcast area: Kansas City metropolitan area
- Frequency: 103.3 MHz (HD Radio)
- Branding: Hot 103 Jamz

Programming
- Format: Urban contemporary
- Subchannels: HD2: Urban oldies

Ownership
- Owner: Carter Broadcast Group
- Sister stations: KPRT

History
- First air date: 1963
- Former call signs: KPRS-FM (1963–1974)
- Call sign meaning: Kansas City's Peoples Radio Station

Technical information
- Licensing authority: FCC
- Facility ID: 35495
- Class: C
- ERP: 100,000 watts
- HAAT: 303 meters (994 ft)
- Translator: HD2: 106.9 K295CH (Kansas City, KS)

Links
- Public license information: Public file; LMS
- Webcast: Listen live; Listen live (HD2)
- Website: kprs.com; rnb1069.com (HD2)

KPRS (103.3 FM) is a commercial radio station licensed to Kansas City, Missouri, United States, owned by the Carter Broadcast Group. It airs an urban contemporary format, including hip-hop, R&B and Sunday morning urban gospel music. According to the Federal Communications Commission (FCC), it has been continually owned by an African American family longer than any other radio station.

KPRS's studios and transmitter are both located in South Kansas City. The station also broadcasts in HD Radio; urban oldies is heard on its HD2 subchannel, which feeds low-power FM translator K295CH at 106.9 MHz.

== History ==
=== Historic black station ===
In 1950, Andrew "Skip" Carter began operating KPRS as the nation's first radio station west of the Mississippi River programmed for black listeners. Its transmitter was donated by former Kansas governor Alf Landon. KPRS debuted as a 500-watt daytimer at 1590 AM, with a playlist of R&B and soul music along with news and talk of interest to African-Americans. The call letters were chosen to represent the "People's Radio Station." In 1951, KPRS opened its first studio at 12th and Walnut Street in Kansas City. By 1952, Carter and Ed and Psyche Pate became business partners and purchased the station for $40,000 from the Johnson County Broadcasting Corporation. They moved KPRS to a new site at 2814 East 23rd Street in Kansas City.

KPRS applied for an FM license on May 22, 1961, which was granted on December 20, 1961. KPRS-FM received its first license on May 16, 1963, and went on the air later that year. While most people did not yet own FM receivers in 1963, the FM band was gaining in popularity.

=== Switch to FM ===
In 1969, the Carter Family had controlling interest in the station. In 1971, KPRS (AM) moved its programming to the 103.3 frequency under the KPRS-FM call letters and moniker “K103” (which would later be rebranded as "Hot 103 Jamz" in the 1990s). The 1590 frequency became an urban gospel-formatted station. The studios and offices moved to the Crown Center and the Carters moved to Florida to open a new corporate headquarters.

KPRS-FM dropped the -FM suffix on October 15, 1974, when its sister AM station changed its call sign to KPRT that same day. In 1975, KPRS became one of the first fully automated radio stations in the Midwest. DJs such as Chris King and Freddie Bell read news updates, while also announcing songs. (Bell called himself "Frederick" during newscasts.)

=== Family business ===
Ensuring the business would remain a family-run entity, Michael Carter, Andrew's grandson, was named president of the company. One of his first moves was to take both stations back to "live" formats with less reliance on automation. Michael Carter, who made his radio debut at age 8 on KPRS, also programmed KPRS for 24-hour a day service.

In January 1988, original station owner Andrew Carter died at his Florida home. To honor the black radio pioneer's legacy, the KPRS Broadcasting Corporation changed its name to the Carter Broadcast Group in 1993. His widow, Mildred Carter, became chairperson of the board. The stations continued to serve the African-American community with outreach programs and charitable promotions. In 1990, KPRS jumped from 8th to 5th in the Kansas City market, according to Arbitron ratings. Also in the 1990s, KPRS stopped playing what it perceived as negative hip-hop or gangsta rap along with explicit and overtly sexual lyrics. In 1995, KPRS won the "Crystal Award" from the National Association of Broadcasters. As the Carter Broadcast Group celebrated its 45th anniversary in 1995, KPRS had its highest ratings ever, reaching number one that year. In 2000, the company celebrated its 50th anniversary. In 2005, the station began carrying the Steve Harvey Morning Show.

The Carter Broadcast Group, owners of KPRS and KPRT, along with The Sherman Broadcast Group, were co-owners of an Urban Contemporary station known as KSJM, “107-9 Jamz”, in Wichita, Kansas. In late 2007, the two groups sold KSJM to The Ag Network Group, which dropped the Urban format for Country as KWLS "US-107.9" on January 19, 2008.

In fall 2009, KPRS added more rhythmic/pop crossover titles from artists like Justin Bieber, Miley Cyrus, Iyaz, Kesha, Katy Perry, and Jason DeRulo. This was most likely due to the implementation of Portable People Meters (PPM) in the Kansas City Arbitron ratings. This caused significant controversy, as the only black-owned Hip Hop/R&B station in the Kansas City market was, in the eyes of many of its long-time listeners, attempting to appeal to a new audience. The station has since ended this tactic.

In August 2010, the station dropped Steve Harvey, replacing him with "More Music In The Mornings" with J.T. Quick. In April 2011, management made a change within the programming department by replacing operations manager Andre Carson with longtime music director Myron Fears.

In July 2011, KPRS repositioned its DJ lineup to help improve its ratings. The morning show changed from "More Music In the Mornings" to "The Morning Jam", and was now hosted by station veterans Tony G and Sean Tyler. Julee Jonez hosts the mid-day show, while J.T. Quick moved from morning drive to afternoon drive, and the night show is rotated by Brian B. Shynin', Brooklyn Martino and Playmaker. In June 2012, KPRS returned to the #1 position in the Kansas City Arbitron ratings.

In 2023, KPRS received direct competition when KCJK, owned by Cumulus Media, flipped to urban contemporary as "Power 105.1." This has caused a drop in ratings for KPRS, although it usually leads KCJK.

== HD Radio ==
In 2016, KPRS launched an HD2 digital subchannel, which aired a classic hip hop and old-school R&B format as "K-103.3 HD-2".

On May 15, 2023, KPRS-HD2 shifted to urban adult contemporary as "RNB 106.9", and began simulcasting on FM translator K295CH (106.9 FM).

== Station management ==
- Operations Manager Myron Fears
- Community Relations/Public Affairs Director Rich McCauley
- Station Voice Pat Garrett
