= KPRT (AM) =

Kansas City, Missouri; United States
- Broadcast area: Kansas City Metropolitan Area
- Frequency: 1590 kHz
- Branding: Gospel 1590 KPRT

Programming
- Format: Urban gospel

Ownership
- Owner: Carter Broadcast Group
- Sister stations: KPRS

History
- First air date: August 11, 1949 (date first licensed)
- Call sign meaning: a sequential variation of KPRS

Technical information
- Licensing authority: FCC
- Class: D
- Power: 1,000 watts (daytime); 500 watts (twilight); 47 watts (nighttime)
- Transmitter coordinates: 39°04′05″N 94°32′10″W
- Translator: 106.1 K291CN (Kansas City)

Links
- Public license information: Public file; LMS
- Website: http://www.kprt.com/

KPRT (1590 AM) is an Urban Gospel music-formatted radio station that broadcasts from Kansas City. It is owned by Carter Broadcast Group, owner of sister station and flagship KPRS ("Hot 103 Jamz"). The station's studios are located in South Kansas City, and the transmitter is in the city's East Side.

== History ==
KPRT began operations as KPRS in 1949. The Johnson County Broadcasting Group applied for a license for 1590 kHz on July 1, 1948. In 1949, they sought to move to 1550 kHz with 1,000 watts, but retracted the frequency change request. It would try again to change frequency & boost its power in 1951, to 1380 kHz with 1,000 watts.

Andrew "Skip" Carter began operating KPRS as the nation's first Black radio station west of the Mississippi River although it was still owned by former Kansas governor, Alf Landon. KPRS/1590 debuted as a 500-watt daytimer with a playlist that consisted of R&B and soul. In 1951, KPRS opened its first studio at 12th and Walnut street, Kansas City, Missouri. By 1952, Carter and Ed and Psyche Pate became business partners and purchased the station for $40,000 from the Johnson County Broadcasting Corporation. They moved KPRS to a new site at 2814 East 23rd Street in Kansas City.

In 1969, the Carters had controlling interest in the station. In 1971, KPRS moved its programming to the 103.3 frequency on the FM dial and became KPRS-FM, "Hot 103 Jamz" and the 1590 frequency became KPRT, "Gospel 1590, The Gospel Source" an urban gospel-formatted station. The studios and offices moved to the Crown Center and the Carters moved to Florida to open a new corporate headquarters. Four years later in 1975, KPRS Broadcasting Corporation, later renamed Carter Broadcasting Group, became one of the first fully automated radio stations in the Midwest. Now as KPRT, the station's playlist mostly consists of contemporary gospel music 24 hours a day.

== Translator ==
In 2017 KPRT began rebroadcasting on FM translator K291CN.

Broadcast translator for KPRT
Call sign	Frequency	City of license	FID	ERP (W)	HAAT	Class	Transmitter coordinates	FCC info
K291CN	106.1 FM	Kansas City, Missouri	142032	95	0 m (0 ft)	D	39°4′5″N 94°32′10″W	LMS
