= KCMO-FM =

- Shawnee, Kansas; United States
- Broadcast area: Kansas City Metropolitan Area
- Frequency: 94.9 MHz (HD Radio)
- Branding: 94.9 KCMO

Programming
- Language: English
- Format: Classic hits
- Subchannels: HD2: KMJK simulcast "107.3/102.5 Jack FM" (Adult hits)
- Affiliations: United Stations Radio Networks

Ownership
- Owner: Cumulus Media; (CMP Houston-KC, LLC)
- Sister stations: KCFX; KCHZ; KCJK; KCMO; KMJK

History
- First air date: February 1948 (as KCFM)
- Former call signs: KCFM (1948–1950); KCMO-FM (1950–1968); KFMU (1968–1974); KCEZ (1974–1983); KCMO-FM (1983–1985); KBKC (1985–1986); KCPW (1986–1989)
- Call sign meaning: Kansas City, Missouri

Technical information
- Facility ID: 6385
- Class: C0
- ERP: 100,000 watts
- HAAT: 341.1 meters (1,119 ft)
- Transmitter coordinates: 39°5′26″N 94°28′18.8″W
- Translator: HD2: 102.5 K273BZ (Bonner Springs)

Links
- Webcast: Listen live; Listen live; Listen live (via iHeartRadio); HD2: Listen live
- Website: www.949kcmo.com; HD2: www.jackfmkc.com

KCMO-FM (94.9 MHz, "94-9 KCMO") is a commercial radio station licensed to Shawnee, Kansas, and serving the Kansas City metropolitan area. The station is owned by Cumulus Broadcasting and airs a classic hits radio format, switching to all-Christmas music from mid-November to December 25. KCMO-FM's studios and offices are located in the Corporate Woods area in Overland Park, Kansas. The transmitter is off Menown Avenue in Independence, Missouri.

KCMO-FM broadcasts in the HD Radio format, with its HD2 signal airing an adult hits format, known as "102.5 Jack FM", which is simulcast on 250 watt translator K273BZ at 102.5 MHz.

== History ==
=== Early years ===
One of the first FM stations in Kansas City, KCMO-FM signed on as KCFM in February 1948. It was a simulcast of KCMO (AM), then at 810 AM. During the "Golden Age of Radio", the stations aired ABC Radio Network dramas, comedies, news, sports, game shows, soap operas and big band broadcasts. The KCMO-FM call sign was granted in 1950, the first of several times the station would go by that call sign.

The Meredith Corporation bought KCMO-AM-FM in 1953. On July 23, 1959, as the days of network programming ended, KCMO-AM-FM adopted a full service, middle of the road (MOR) personality format.

=== Beautiful music ===
On March 16, 1968, KCMO-FM separated its programming from 810 AM, and began airing a mostly instrumental beautiful music format as KFMU. In 1974, the station began adding a few vocals to the format and switched its call letters to KCEZ, "EZ 95".

In 1983, the Meredith Corporation sold KCMO-AM-FM to Richard Fairbanks, a one-time owner of what is now WXIA-TV in Atlanta, Georgia, and the head of Fairbanks Broadcasting.

=== Country and Top 40 ===
On October 10, 1983, the station adopted a country music format as "KC 95". The KCMO-FM call sign returned in 1984. The station gained attention when one of its billboards appeared in a Psychedelic Furs music video. Fairbanks sold both stations in 1985 to the Summit Communications Group. Summit changed KCMO-FM to a dance-leaning Top 40 format as KBKC, "B95", on July 26, 1985. The first song as "B95" was "Start Me Up" by The Rolling Stones.

The Gannett Company bought the station in 1986, and shifted the station to a more adult-friendly mainstream Top 40 format as "Power 95” KCPW, on August 25 of that year. During this period, Dick Wilson began as the morning host. Wilson would continue to host mornings on the frequency until 2017.

=== Switch to oldies ===
On July 28, 1989, at 5 p.m., after playing "Don't Wanna Lose You" by Gloria Estefan, KCPW flipped to an oldies format as "Oldies 95", with the third use of the KCMO-FM call sign acquired days before the switch. The first song on "Oldies 95" was "Kansas City" by Wilbert Harrison.

Another oldies station serving Kansas City, WHB (then at 710 AM), saw most of its listeners switch over to KCMO-FM in a matter of months, prompting that station's conversion to farm radio.

KCMO-FM logo used from the mid-1990s-2005

In 1993, Gannett sold KCMO-AM-FM to Bonneville International, which also owned KMBZ and KLTH (now KZPT). Four years later, Bonneville sold all four of its Kansas City stations together with three radio stations in Seattle to Entercom Communications.

Susquehanna Radio bought KCMO-AM-FM from Entercom in 2000, as Entercom was forced to sell the KCMO stations after its purchase of Sinclair Broadcast Group's radio stations KQRC, KXTR and KCIY, which left Entercom with two stations over the Federal Communications Commission's single-market ownership limit. Susquehanna subsequently merged with Cumulus Media in mid-2006.

=== Classic hits ===
KCMO-FM logo used under previous slogan and format

KCMO-FM enjoyed strong ratings throughout the 1990s and early 2000s. In 2005, management became concerned that the name "oldies" appealed to older listeners, less attractive to advertisers. Ratings were not an issue, as the station was often in the top 10. The station dropped its "oldies" moniker in April 2005 and shifted to its current classic hits format, playing only music from the mid-1960s to the early-1980s.

In the mid-2010s, KCMO began playing hits from the early 1990s, and scaled back on music recorded before the 1970s. Today, the station's playlist focuses mainly on music from the 1980s.

== KCMO-FM HD2 ==
On February 14, 2011, the station turned on its HD2 sub-channel and launched an all-comedy format branded as "Funny 102.5". It is also heard on translator station K273BZ (102.5 FM), hence the 102.5 in the moniker. On January 2, 2013, 102.5 FM flipped to sports talk as an affiliate of CBS Sports Radio, branded as "102.5 The Fan".

On August 15, 2014, at 3 p.m., the station abruptly dropped the sports format in the middle of a sports update, and began a 7-minute countdown. After the countdown, 102.5/94.9-HD2 became one of the first network affiliates of the new Cumulus-owned "Nash Icon" format as 102.5 Nash Icon, playing country hits from the 1980s, 90s and early 2000s. "Nash Icon" began with "Wagon Wheel" by Darius Rucker.

On November 2, 2015, at midnight, after playing "You Ain't Much Fun" by Toby Keith, 102.5/94.9-HD2 changed its format to alternative rock, branded as "102.5 The Underground", beginning with "Kansas City" by The New Basement Tapes. With the change, 102.5/94.9-HD2 became the first Nash/Nash Icon station to drop the format.

On June 15, 2016, at 7:30 a.m., after playing "Up&Up" by Coldplay, 102.5/94.9-HD2 swapped formats with co-owned KCJK, adopting that station's adult hits format, and rebranded as "102.5 Jack FM", while the alternative format moved to KCJK. The first song after the move was "Start Me Up" by The Rolling Stones. The format would prove successful enough under the circumstances to spark a retaliatory flip of KCKC to the format in December 2024; as that proved to be successful market competition for the format, it was thus promoted to a full-fledged signal once more when Cumulus chose to simulcast it on KMJK, albeit still as an intentional simulcast with 102.5 FM, with the move officially occurring on August 25, 2026.
