= KCHZ =

Simulcast of KCMO, Kansas City, MO
- Ottawa, Kansas; United States
- Broadcast area: Kansas City metropolitan area; Topeka metropolitan area
- Frequency: 95.7 MHz
- Branding: KCMO Talk Radio

Programming
- Format: Conservative talk
- Network: Fox News Radio
- Affiliations: Westwood One; KCTV (weather)

Ownership
- Owner: Cumulus Media, Inc.; (CMP Houston-KC, LLC)
- Sister stations: KCFX; KCJK; KCMO; KCMO-FM; KMJK

History
- First air date: March 1, 1962
- Former call signs: KOFO-FM (1962–1978); KKKX (1978–1986); KHUM-FM (1986); KHUM (1986–1992); KZTO (1992–1996)
- Call sign meaning: Former "Channel Z" brand

Technical information
- Licensing authority: FCC
- Facility ID: 33332
- Class: C1
- ERP: 98,000 watts
- HAAT: 299 meters (981 ft)
- Transmitter coordinates: 39°0′45″N 95°1′46.9″W

Links
- Public license information: Public file; LMS
- Webcast: Listen live
- Website: kcmotalkradio.com

KCHZ (95.7 FM) is a commercial radio station licensed to Ottawa, Kansas, United States, and serving the Kansas City metropolitan area. Owned by Cumulus Media, it carries a conservative talk format in a simulcast with KCMO (710 AM), with studios located on Indian Creek Parkway in Overland Park, Kansas.

KCHZ's transmitter is sited off 198th Street near Stranger Creek in Linwood, Kansas.

== History ==
=== Early years ===
The station first began broadcasting as KOFO-FM, an FM simulcast for sister station KOFO (1220 AM). The station signed on the air on March 1, 1962. It was only powered at 6,700 watts and could only be heard in and around Ottawa, Kansas, not in the larger Kansas City metropolitan area.

In 1978, the station stopped simulcasting its AM sister station. It was automated, playing a mix of Top 40 and album-oriented rock (AOR) as "96X", with the call sign KKKX.

In 1986, the station flipped to easy listening/adult contemporary, branded as "96 HUM", and changed its call sign to KHUM. The station relocated its transmitter from its original site near Ottawa to a site near Overbrook. It upgraded its power to 100,000 watts, and relocated its studios, first to Lawrence, then to Topeka. In 1991, the station went silent.

In 1993, the station signed back on as adult contemporary KZTO, branded as "Z96". The studios were in Lawrence, near 25th and Iowa, with a transmitter located southeast of the city. In January 1994, the station went silent again.

=== Channel Z 95 ===
The 95.7 frequency signed back on under the control of Radio 2000, Inc. on January 21, 1997, initially by stunting with all-1980s music and a heartbeat sound effect for about a week, before flipping to a modern adult contemporary format as "Channel Z95" under the KCHZ calls. The name would be inspired by sister station WCHZ in Augusta, GA. This was the frequency's first attempt to target the Kansas City area. During this time, the station used the slogan "Kansas City's Superstation". KCHZ would gain a competitor in September 1997, when KYYS flipped to modern AC. In early 1998, KCHZ relocated its transmitter to its current location near Linwood to improve coverage within the Kansas City metropolitan area, particularly in Missouri.

=== Z95.7 ===
By January 1998, KCHZ shifted to Top 40/CHR, then to rhythmic contemporary by 1999. During this period, KCHZ called itself "Z95.7 - Kansas City's Hottest Hits".

The station was sold to Syncom Radio in 1999, and Syncom continued to adjust the station's image. KCHZ shifted back to mainstream Top 40/CHR in 2000, back to rhythmic CHR by 2002, then back to a mainstream CHR by late 2003, when Cumulus Broadcasting bought the station.

=== The Vibe ===
By November 2005, after years of confusing listeners over what direction the station was taking, Cumulus decided that 95.7 needed a complete overhaul. To bring attention to the changeover, KCHZ began stunting with all-Christmas music at noon on November 1, 2005, as "Jingle 95.7", jumping the gun a week before KUDL or KCKC would even start broadcasting Christmas music. However, by the next day, the station shifted its stunting to a loop of "Swans Splashdown" by Jean-Jacques Perrey and "Lonesome Road" by Dean Elliot & His Big Band.

At 5 p.m. on November 3, KCHZ shifted to rhythmic CHR for a third time as "95-7 The Vibe, The Beat of Kansas City", with The Black Eyed Peas' "My Humps" being the first song played. During its tenure as a Rhythmic station, KCHZ aired a few syndicated shows, including "The Weekend Top 30 Countdown" with Hollywood Hamilton, as well as "Sunday Night Slow Jams" with R.Dub.

On January 27, 2009, KCHZ adjusted their format to feature more mainstream top 40 hits and dropped the majority of its old school and hip hop hits, but still maintained its rhythmic format somewhat. KCHZ continued to report to R&R/Nielsen BDS Rhythmic Airplay panel.

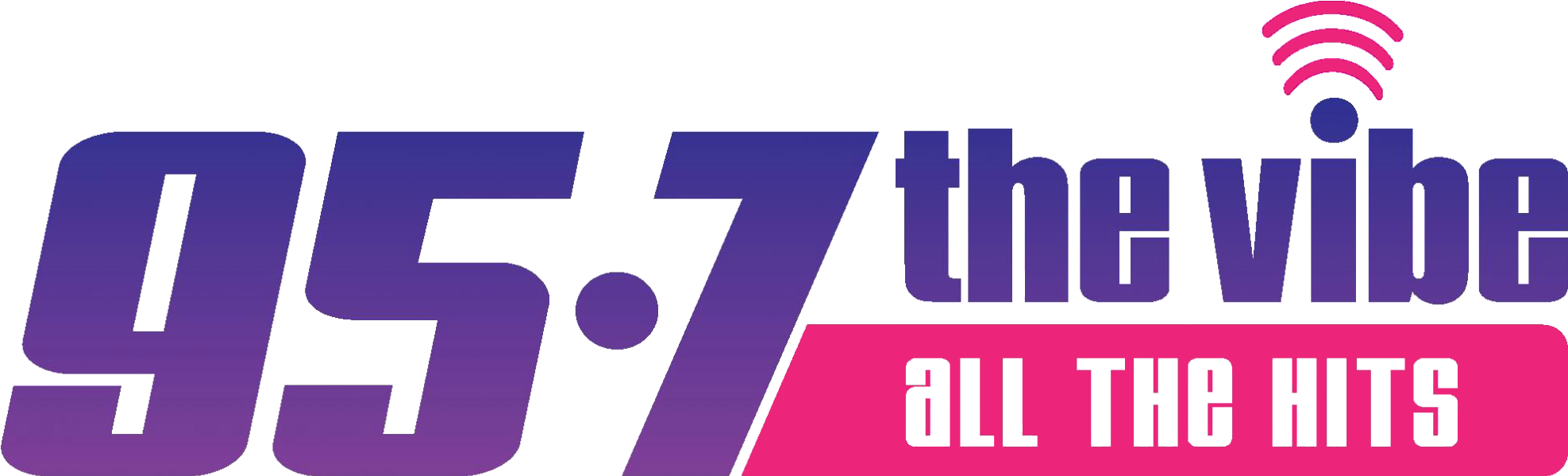
KCHZ logo (2009-2023)

By October 2009, KCHZ fully shifted back to mainstream Top 40. This was part of Cumulus' plan to launch mainstream Top 40 stations in major markets across the country. With the change, morning hosts "Shorty & the Boyz", who had hosted mornings since 2005, were let go. In 2018, KCHZ began airing "The Bert Show" in mornings, syndicated from sister station WWWQ in Atlanta.

=== KCMO simulcast ===
On October 6, 2023, at midnight, after playing "Flowers" by Miley Cyrus, Cumulus moved KCHZ's top 40/CHR format and "Vibe" branding to sister station KMJK. This was part of a multi-station move among Cumulus' Kansas City stations; KMJK's urban format moved to KCJK the previous week. Both stations simulcast until just after midnight on October 12, when, after playing "Greedy" by Tate McRae and a short commercial break, KCHZ flipped to a simulcast of news/talk-formatted KCMO. On June 8, 2026, Topeka sister station KTOP-FM began simulcasting KCMO/KCHZ.

== Programming ==
Local personalities on KCHZ/KCMO include Pete Mundo and Kevin Keitzman; the rest of the schedule is nationally syndicated conservative talk shows.
