= Union Now =

Book by Clarence Streit

- Front cover of the postwar edition of Clarence Streit's Union Now.
- Author: Clarence Streit
- Publication date: 1939

Union Now is a book by journalist Clarence Streit calling for a federal union of fifteen of the world's major democracies. The first edition of the book was published in 1939. The book attracted public attention to world federalist and Atlanticist ideas and helped lay the groundwork for the efforts of Streit's organization Federal Union, Inc. (which later became the Association to Unite the Democracies).

== Background ==
As a New York Times correspondent at the League of Nations, Streit was disturbed by the democracies' apparent inability to deal with such crises as the Japanese invasion of Manchuria and the rise of Nazism. He came to the conclusion that at the root of the League's problems were nationalism and the democracies' ignorance of their own share of the world's economic and military power. Streit began work on his proposal for a union of democracies in 1933. In 1938, with world war appearing increasingly likely, the book was accepted for publication by Harper & Brothers.

== Summary ==
Streit proposed a "nucleus" of fifteen nations that he regarded as relatively mature democracies: The United States, the United Kingdom, Canada, Australia, New Zealand, South Africa, Ireland, France, Belgium, the Netherlands, Switzerland, Denmark, Norway, Sweden and Finland. This union was to be organized roughly along the lines of the federal system of the United States: while some power would be ceded to the newly established central authority, each nation would retain some measure of sovereignty. Nations that the federation deemed worthy of membership would be added subsequently on the basis of their commitment to democracy, with the hope that the union would eventually come to encompass the entire globe.

== Reception and legacy ==
Writing in the New York Times, historian James Truslow Adams offered cautious praise for Streit's proposal, stating that "[s]ome day, in the kind of world we live in, with space annihilated and interdependence between nations complete, something like what Mr. Streit suggests will have to come to pass." Philip Kerr, 11th Marquess of Lothian also praised the book, describing Streit's plan as a democratic, peaceful alternative to the ideological visions provided by fascism and communism.

However, it was partly in response to Union Now that George Orwell wrote his famous essay "Not Counting Niggers", in which he called the 'democratic' character of Streit's proposed union into doubt. While writing that Streit had "an essentially decent cast of mind," Orwell expressed pessimism about Streit's mission:

[O]ne begins to see what would really be happening if Mr Streit's scheme were put into operation. The British and French empires, with their six hundred million disenfranchised human beings, would simply be receiving fresh police forces; the huge strength of the USA would be behind the robbery of India and Africa. Mr Streit is letting cats out of bags, but all phrases like 'Peace Bloc', 'Peace Front', etc contain some such implication; all imply a tightening-up of the existing structure.
