= KCMO (AM) =

- Kansas City, Missouri; United States
- Broadcast area: Kansas City Metropolitan Area
- Frequency: 710 kHz
- Branding: KCMO Talk Radio

Programming
- Format: Talk
- Network: Fox News Radio
- Affiliations: Westwood One; KCTV (weather)

Ownership
- Owner: Cumulus Media; (CMP Houston-KC, LLC)
- Sister stations: KCHZ; KCFX; KCJK; KCMO-FM; KMJK

History
- First air date: 1925
- Former call signs: KWKC (1925–1936)
- Former frequencies: 1370 kHz (1925–1939); 1450 kHz (1939–1941); 1480 kHz (1941–1947); 810 kHz (1947–1998)
- Call sign meaning: Kansas City, Missouri

Technical information
- Licensing authority: FCC
- Facility ID: 33391
- Class: B
- Power: 10,000 watts day; 5,000 watts night
- Transmitter coordinates: 39°19′8″N 94°29′48.8″W
- Repeaters: 95.7 KCHZ (Ottawa, Kansas); 102.9 KTOP-FM (St. Marys, Kansas); 101.1 KCFX-HD2 (Harrisonville)

Links
- Public license information: Public file; LMS
- Webcast: Listen live; Listen live (via iHeartRadio)
- Website: www.kcmotalkradio.com

KCMO (710 kHz) is a commercial AM radio station licensed to Kansas City, Missouri. Owned by Cumulus Media, the station airs a talk radio format. The studios and offices are on Indian Creek Parkway in Overland Park, Kansas. KCMO is also heard on KCHZ (95.7 FM) in Ottawa, Kansas, on KTOP-FM (102.9 FM) in St. Marys, Kansas, and on the second HD Radio channel of co-owned KCFX (101.1) in Harrisonville, Missouri.

The AM transmitter is off North Eastern Road, near Interstate 435, on Kansas City's Northeast side. KCMO broadcasts with 10,000 watts by day and 5,000 watts at night, using a directional antenna at all times. The station is heard around the Kansas City metropolitan area, in sections of Missouri and Kansas. With a good radio, the signal can also be heard in parts of Iowa, Oklahoma, Illinois, Arkansas and Nebraska. Due to KCMO's low transmitting frequency, plus Kansas's flat terrain and excellent ground conductivity, the station has an unusually large daytime coverage area, reaching a population area of nearly 12 million people.

== Programming ==
Weekdays begin with a local news and information show hosted by Pete Mundo, followed by a local talk show with Kevin Keitzman. Nationally syndicated conservative talk shows make up the rest of the weekday schedule. Hosts include Vince Coglianese, Guy Benson, Mark Levin, Will Cain, Bill O'Reilly, Dave Ramsey and Red Eye Radio. Weekends feature shows on money, health, religion, cooking, travel and the outdoors, some of which are brokered programming. Syndicated weekend hosts include Rich Valdes and Chris Plante.

At various times in its history, KCMO has carried hourly newscasts from either CBS Radio News or Fox News Radio. At the beginning of 2015, KCMO and most Cumulus Media talk stations switched to Westwood One News, a Cumulus network. When that service ended in 2020, KCMO returned to hourly updates from Fox.

== History ==
=== Early years ===
The station started in 1925 by Wilson Duncan Broadcasting as KWKC on AM 1370. In 1936, it changed its call letters to KCMO (Kansas City, Missouri). In 1939, it moved to 1450 AM and then 1480 AM in 1941. In November 1947, KCMO moved to 810 AM, where it stayed for more than half a century. During much of that time, KCMO was affiliated with the CBS Radio Network, carrying its line up of dramas, comedies, news, sports, soap operas, game shows and big band broadcasts during the "Golden Age of Radio".

Walter Cronkite was a sports announcer at the station in 1936 with the on air name of "Walter Wilcox". While at KCMO, Cronkite met his wife, Mary Elizabeth Maxwell, and later left to become a reporter for United Press International, before becoming a long-time TV anchor for CBS News.

=== Acquisition by Meredith Corp. ===
In 1953, television station KCMO-TV was launched. The Meredith Corporation acquired both the radio and television stations in October 1953, less than a month after the television station went on the air. Meredith later acquired what became KCMO-FM (94.9). In 1955, it switched network affiliations to CBS Radio, swapping network affiliations with KMBC, as part of a group deal that Meredith saw a radio and TV affiliation deal with CBS in three cities for five stations

In 1978 Meredith built a new facility for its broadcasting stations in Fairway, Kansas. The radio stations were spun off from the television station in 1983, and the TV station changed its call letters to KCTV. (Meredith continued to own KCTV until 2021, when its television stations were acquired by Gray Television.) That year, Richard Fairbanks bought both KCMO and KCMO-FM.

The stations were then sold to the Summit Communications Group in 1985, then to the Gannett Company in 1986. Bonneville International, which already owned rival stations KMBZ (the former KMBC) and KLTH (now KZPT), acquired both KCMO stations in 1993.

=== Sale to Entercom and switch to AM 710 ===
In 1997, Bonneville sold its entire Kansas City cluster plus three radio stations in Seattle to Entercom Communications. On October 8, 1997, shortly after Entercom assumed control of the KCMO stations, KCMO swapped frequencies with WHB, with KCMO moving to its present-day dial position of 710 AM and WHB relocating to 810 AM. Due to the way the switch was structured, the Federal Communications Commission (FCC) considers KCMO to be legally the same station as the old WHB.

In 2000, Entercom was forced to sell both KCMO stations to Susquehanna Radio after its purchase of Sinclair Broadcasting's Kansas City properties, KQRC-FM, KXTR-FM and KCIY-FM. The acquisition left Entercom two stations over the FCC's single-market ownership limit. Cumulus Media became the owner of both KCMO and its FM sister station in 2006 with its acquisition of Susquehanna.

=== Changes under Cumulus ownership ===
When Cumulus assumed control of the station in mid-2006, local morning host Van Patrick quit on air, apparently upset over the firing of his producer as well as others in the building, during a national layoff of Cumulus employees. On September 12, the station began a new morning show, hosted by Chris Stigall. Stigall has since left the station, being replaced by Rob Carson. Carson was later replaced by Gregg Knapp as morning host. Pete Mundo is the latest morning drive time personality.

Previous logo

On April 30, 2012, KCMO began simulcasting on FM translator 103.7 K279BI via KCFX-HD2.

On October 12, 2023, at midnight, KCMO began simulcasting on sister station KCHZ. This was part of a multi-station move among Cumulus' Kansas City stations, with KMJK's urban format moving to KCJK two weeks prior, followed by the move of KCHZ's Top 40/CHR format to KMJK.

On December 11, 2024, the station stopped simulcasting on 103.7 FM, as Cumulus leased the signal to Union Broadcasting, who uses it to simulcast WHB.

On June 8, 2026, Topeka sister station KTOP-FM began simulcasting KCMO/KCHZ.

=== Controversy ===
In light of Michael Savage's controversial remarks concerning Islam, a group of 70 representatives from various local religious groups including Christianity, Buddhism, Judaism and Islam, gathered in a May 2008 interfaith meeting against alleged bigotry and urged KCMO to drop Savage's program. Savage's show, "The Savage Nation," was syndicated by Westwood One, co-owned with KCMO, and heard afternoons on AM 710.

== Notable former hosts ==
- Chris Baker
- Conrad Dobler
- Harold Ensley
- Al Eschbach
- Kevin Harlan
- Don Harrison
- Rusty Humphries
- Claudia Lamb
- Wayne Larrivee
- Scott Mayman
- Rick Roberts

== See also ==
- Right Between the Ears
