= KCJK =

- Garden City, Missouri; United States
- Broadcast area: Kansas City Metropolitan Area
- Frequency: 105.1 MHz (HD Radio)
- Branding: Hits 105

Programming
- Format: Contemporary hit radio
- Subchannels: HD2: Adult standards "Music of your Life"

Ownership
- Owner: Cumulus Media; (CMP Houston-KC, LLC)
- Sister stations: KCFX; KCHZ; KCMO; KCMO-FM; KMJK

History
- First air date: June 18, 2001
- Former call signs: KFME-FM (2001-2004)
- Call sign meaning: "Kansas City's Jack FM" (former format)

Technical information
- Licensing authority: FCC
- Facility ID: 87565
- Class: C1
- ERP: 72,000 watts
- HAAT: 346 meters (1,135 ft)
- Transmitter coordinates: 39.091°N 94.472°W

Links
- Public license information: Public file; LMS
- Webcast: Listen live
- Website: www.hits105.com

KCJK (105.1 FM, "Hits 105") is a radio station licensed to serve Garden City, Missouri. Owned by Cumulus Media, it broadcasts a contemporary hit radio format. The station's studios are located in Overland Park, Kansas, while its transmitter is located in Independence, Missouri.

== History ==
=== e105 ===
In 1999, Jesscom began the process to move KGAR from Garden City, Missouri (45 miles southeast) to the Kansas City metro. This would require KKJO-FM in St. Joseph, Missouri to move from 105.1 to 105.5 FM, which happened on April 24, 2000.

On June 18, 2001, at 2:00 pm, 105.1 debuted in Kansas City as "e105-1.fm". (Intending to emphasize the modernity of the new station in hopes of gathering a relevant audience, it deliberately co-branded with its website address, the ".fm" portion literally pronounced in sweepers on-air, with the name inspired by the then-growing popularity of the E- prefix in the digital community.) The station would change its call letters to KFME and air a 1980s hits/hot AC-hybrid format. "You Get What You Give" by the New Radicals was the first song played. The station's general manager admitted that an Active rock format had been considered, but would be difficult to sell to advertisers. The station was initially owned by Jesscom and Susquehanna Broadcasting as part of a joint ownership venture. By 2002, the station evolved to a traditional Hot adult contemporary format, using the branding "e105: From Retro to Right Now." The station had modest results and earned an NAB Crystal Award for Public Service in 2003.

=== Jack FM ===
After Susquehanna assumed full ownership, KFME flipped to adult hits, and rebranded as "105-1 Jack FM", on October 7, 2004, at Noon. e105's final song was "Don't Speak" by No Doubt, while Jack FM's first song was "Dancing Queen" by ABBA. KFME would later change call letters to KCJK. Jack FM initially debuted with considerable success. Like other Jack stations, KCJK was mostly jockless and stuck to a computerized playlist, highlighted by segments that include the "No-Request Nooner" and liners chastising drivers who slow down to see accidents in the opposite set of freeway lanes.

KCJK and Susquehanna's properties were acquired by Cumulus Media in May 2006. Upon taking over the station, Cumulus added live disc jockeys, a rare move for an adult hits outlet. Most of the station's air talent were let go in 2013, and KCJK returned to being automated and jockless.

=== Alternative rock ===
On June 15, 2016, at 7:30 am, after playing a block of "end"-themed songs (including "Enjoy the Silence" by Depeche Mode, "In the End" by Linkin Park, "Should I Stay or Should I Go" by The Clash, "Come Sail Away" by Styx, and "Closing Time" by Semisonic, which then culminated with "The Final Countdown" by Europe), KCJK swapped formats with K273BZ/KCMO-FM-HD2, adopted their alternative rock format, and rebranded as "X 105.1." The first song on "X" was "Uprising" by Muse. KCJK competed with Entercom's KRBZ, who was ranked 6th with a 4.6 in the April 2016 Nielsen ratings report for the Kansas City market (KCJK was ranked 13th with a 3.6 share). The format swap marked the third time a station in the Kansas City market used the "X" moniker, the first being KXXR from June 1990 to June 1991, and KCCX/KNRX from March 1997 to January 1999. Much of the programming originated from other markets, including The Woody Show in morning drive from Los Angeles. The midday and evening shifts were voice-tracked by DJs at WKQX in Chicago.

On February 7, 2019, Afentra, formerly of KRBZ, joined KCJK for afternoons. Eight months later, Afentra left the station.

=== Active rock ===
On October 10, 2019, at Midnight, after playing "Helena" by My Chemical Romance, KCJK relaunched as 105.1 The X, shifting toward a hybrid format with an active rock-leaning presentation that continued to feature an emphasis on alternative rock content alongside other hard rock hits (dubbed "rockternative", with examples spanning from Disturbed, AC/DC and Mötley Crüe, to Pearl Jam, Tool and Panic! at the Disco). The first song after the relaunch was "Plush" by Stone Temple Pilots. The station continued to air the syndicated Woody Show in morning drive, while other dayparts were held by local DJs.

=== Urban contemporary ===
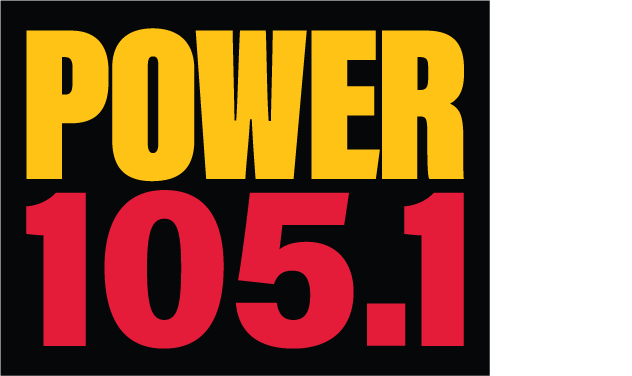
"Power 105.1" logo (2023-2026)

On September 28, 2023, KCJK announced that the "X" format would end later that day, with assistant program director/managing director/midday host Joel Weiss and afternoon host Jaye Powers hosting farewell shows. At 4 p.m. that day, after playing "Touch, Peel and Stand" by Days of the New (which would be abruptly cut off near the end; the last full song played was "Wherever I May Roam" by Metallica), KCJK adopted sister station KMJK's urban contemporary format, and rebranded as "Power 105.1". The first song on "Power" was "SkeeYee" by Sexyy Red. Both KCJK and KMJK simulcasted until midnight on October 6, when KMJK adopted KCHZ's Top 40/CHR format as "107.3 The Vibe."

=== Contemporary hit radio ===
On August 10, 2026, the entirety of KCJK's airstaff was let go as part of a series of company-wide layoffs initiated by Cumulus ahead of a format change. The next day at midnight, after playing "Ah Ha" by Cardi B, KCJK assumed KMJK's contemporary hit radio format as "Hits 105." To promote the move (which began with "Dracula" by Tame Impala), KMJK and KCJK both began simulcasting the format. The simulcast ran until August 25 at midnight, when KMJK flipped to a simulcast of KCMO-FM-HD2's adult hits format as "Jack FM".
