= Clarence Streit =

American journalist (1896–1986)

- Born: Clarence Kirshman Streit; January 21, 1896; California, Missouri
- Died: July 6, 1986 (aged 90); Washington, D.C.
- Education: University of Montana; The Sorbonne; Oxford University
- Occupation: War correspondent
- Spouse: Jeanne DeFrance
- Relatives: Felix Rohatyn (former son-in-law)
- Writing career
- Notable work: Union Now

Clarence Kirschman Streit (German pronunciation: [ʃtʀaɪ̯t]; January 21, 1896 – July 6, 1986) was an American journalist who played a prominent role in the Atlanticist and world federalist movements.

== Life and career ==
Streit was born in California, Missouri, the son of Louis Leland Streit and Emma (Kirschman) Streit. Of Palatine German origin, he relocated with his family to Missoula, Montana, in 1911. In Missoula, he founded the Konah, a high school newspaper that is now one of the oldest in the United States in continuous publication. While a student at Montana State University (now the University of Montana), he volunteered for military service during World War I, serving in an Intelligence unit in France and assisting the American delegation at the Conference of Versailles. He was a Rhodes scholar at University of Oxford during 1920. He married Jeanne Defrance in Paris in 1921, after which he became a foreign correspondent for The New York Times.

In 1929, he was assigned to cover the League of Nations in Switzerland, where he witnessed the League's slow disintegration. That experience, coupled with the development of totalitarian regimes in Europe, convinced him that mankind's best hope was a federal union of democracies, modeled on American federalism. This caused him to write Union Now, a book advocating the political integration of the democracies of Western Europe (including their colonies) and the other English-speaking countries at that time (the United States, Canada, Australia, New Zealand, and South Africa). The book was published in 1939, just prior to World War II. It had sold more than 300,000 copies by 1972.

After the book's publication, Streit founded Federal Union, Inc. (later renamed the Association to Unite the Democracies) to promote his idea. Seeking what he described as "a man of national stature" to help publicize his efforts, he was able to secure the endorsement of Supreme Court Justice Owen Roberts, who would be a friend and collaborator during the years subsequent. In 1949, Streit joined the board of the Roberts-directed Atlantic Union Committee, which advocated a federation of democratic states.

The Streit Council, a successor organization to the Association to Unite the Democracies, was named for him.

== Personal life ==
He was married to Jeanne DeFrance of Lille, France, niece of French jurist Fernand Payen, known for defending Maréchal Pétain in his trial for treason. They met at a bus stop at the Place de l'Opéra in 1920. His daughter, Jeanette Streit (1924-2012), married Felix Rohatyn in 1956; they divorced in 1979.

== Publications ==
- "Where Iron is, there is the Fatherland!" New York: B. W. Huebsch (1920).

"A note on the relation of privilege and monopoly to war."

- Union Now: A Proposal for an Atlantic Federal Union of the Free. England: Butler & Tanner (1939). Full text.
- Freedom Against Itself. New York: Harper (1954).
- Clarence K. Streit's The Unknown Turks: Mustafa Kemal Paşa, Nationalist Ankara and Daily Life in Anatolia, January–March 1921, revised, edited, and annotated by Heath W. Lowry. Istanbul: Bahçeşehir University Press (2011).
