= KCFX =

Radio station in Harrisonville–Kansas City, Missouri

- Harrisonville, Missouri; United States
- Broadcast area: Kansas City Metropolitan Area
- Frequency: 101.1 MHz (HD Radio)
- Branding: 101 The Fox

Programming
- Format: Classic rock
- Subchannels: HD2: KCMO simulcast (News/talk); HD3: Air1 (Worship music); HD4: WHB simulcast (Sports radio)
- Affiliations: Westwood One

Ownership
- Owner: Cumulus Media; (Radio License Holding SRC LLC)
- Sister stations: KCHZ, KCJK, KCMO, KCMO-FM, KMJK

History
- First air date: 1974 (as KIEE at 100.7)
- Former call signs: KIEE (1974-1983)
- Former frequencies: 100.7 MHz (1974-1990)
- Call sign meaning: Kansas City's The FoX

Technical information
- Facility ID: 27021
- Class: C0
- ERP: 100,000 watts
- HAAT: 335 meters (1,099 ft)
- Transmitter coordinates: 39°1′20.00″N 94°30′49.00″W
- Translators: HD3: 107.9 K300CH (Lee's Summit); HD4: 103.7 K279BI (Kansas City)

Links
- Webcast: Listen Live or Listen Live iHeart
- Website: 101thefox.net

KCFX (101.1 FM, "101 The Fox") is a radio station broadcasting a classic rock format. Licensed to the suburb of Harrisonville, Missouri, it serves the Kansas City Metropolitan Area. The station is currently owned by Cumulus Media. The station's studios are located in Overland Park, Kansas, and the transmitter is in Kansas City’s East Side.

== History ==
Playing country and MOR since its inception in 1974, the original call sign was KIEE until changing to KCFX on December 21, 1983. The new album rock format coincided with a signal improvement to 100 kW. In 1985, KCFX developed the current "Fox" format, becoming one of the first classic rock stations in the country. On September 8, 1990, KCFX swapped frequencies with KMZU in Carrollton, jumping from 100.7 MHz to 101.1 in order to provide a stronger signal to cover the Kansas City area. They played a blend of artists from the late 1960s, 1970s, and 1980s. In recent years they have started playing some hits from the 1990s by artists like Bruce Springsteen and Scorpions, as well as Collective Soul, Stone Temple Pilots, and Metallica, among others. This comes after years of billing themselves as only playing 1970s rock with some 1960s and 1980s. As the years wore on, they added more 1980s. The station carried The Bob & Tom Show from March 13, 2006 to February 9, 2007 as its morning drive program. A new local morning show featuring former KYYS voices Larry Moffit and Frankie (formerly middays) replaced that show. On January 11, 2008, longtime rival rocker KYYS changed formats (and call letters to KBLV), prompting KCFX to change its slogan to "Kansas City's Only Classic Rock Station."

In October 2008, Cumulus Media had massive layoffs to its stations across the country. Among those released were KCFX morning team Moffit and Frankie. In March 2009, Slacker, longtime heritage Classic Rock DJ from Kansas City, was installed as the KCFX morning show weekdays from 5 am to 9 am. Program Director Chris Hoffman took over at middays from 9 am to 2 pm, and longtime heritage Classic Rock DJ Skid Roadie aired on the drive home evenings from 2 pm to 7 pm. In 2013, Dan McClintock replaced Chris Hoffman as Program Director. In 2020, Dave Hill became the program director.

In May 2021, longtime afternoon host Skid Roadie retired.

Beginning with the 1990 NFL season, KCFX was the longtime flagship station for the Kansas City Chiefs of the National Football League, one of the first broadcast agreements where an NFL team associated with an FM station rather than a traditional AM radio station. On December 5, 2019, it was announced that Entercom's WDAF-FM (106.5) would become the new flagship of the Chiefs radio network with the start of the 2020 season, ending KCFX's 30-year association with the team. The last game broadcast by KCFX was the team's victory in Super Bowl LIV.

In April 2024, longtime host Brian "Slacker" Adams died from acute myeloid leukemia. He would be replaced by his longtime friend (and former colleague) Doug Medlock.

== KCFX-HD2 ==
On March 18, 2010, KCFX-HD2 signed on with mainstream rock as "103.7 The Dam" (in reference to new FM translator K279BI 103.7 FM). On April 29, 2012, KCFX-HD2 and K279BI changed formats to a simulcast of news/talk-formatted KCMO 710 AM. On December 3, 2024, K279BI changed from relaying KCFX-HD2 to KCFX-HD4.

== KCFX-HD3 ==
KCFX-HD3 is an affiliate of the Educational Media Foundation's Air1 Christian radio network. Prior to May 2019, the station was previously known as "107.9 The Fountain" (in reference to FM translator K300CH 107.9 FM).

== KCFX-HD4 ==
On December 3, 2024, Union Broadcasting began leasing KCFX-HD4 and K279BI from Cumulus to simulcast WHB, putting the station on equal ground with Audacy's KFNZ and KFNZ-FM. It was announced on December 11 that the simulcast would officially begin at 6 a.m. the next day.
