= KESJ =

Radio station in St. Joseph, Missouri

- St. Joseph, Missouri; United States
- Broadcast area: St. Joseph metropolitan area
- Frequency: 1550 kHz
- Branding: JoeTown 107.5

Programming
- Format: Classic hits

Ownership
- Owner: Eagle Communications, Inc.

History
- First air date: June 7, 1946
- Former call signs: KRES (1946–1961); KKJO (1961–1988); KSFT (1988–2009)

Technical information
- Licensing authority: FCC
- Facility ID: 8767
- Class: B
- Power: 2,500 watts (day); 500 watts (night)
- Transmitter coordinates: 39°49′39″N 94°48′39.9″W
- Translator: 107.5 K298DA (St. Joseph)

Links
- Public license information: Public file; LMS
- Webcast: Listen live
- Website: joetown1075.com

KESJ (1550 AM) is a radio station broadcasting a classic hits format, licensed to St. Joseph, Missouri. The station is owned by Eagle Communications, Inc.

== History ==
Former Logo

KESJ came on air on June 7, 1946, as KRES, and was initially on 1230 kHz broadcasting from 113 S. 7th Street. The 1550 frequency debuted as KRES in 1953. Missouri Valley Broadcasting owned the station. KRES used AP News. In 1961, the station was assigned the call letters "KKJO", and it began airing a middle of the road (MOR) format. In 1966, the station adopted a Top 40 format, using a slogan "Tiger Radio". The studios for the station moved to 1101 South Belt Highway. In 1980, the station acquired an FM counterpart on 105.1, from its competitor KUSN. In 1981, the station transitioned from top 40 to adult contemporary and middle of the road programming. In 1988, KKJO and KSFT swapped callsigns, with KSFT landing on the AM frequency. At that time, format was satellite-fed adult standards. In 1999, the station transitioned to 1950s through 1960s Oldies music. It was known as "Oldies 1550". On August 24, 2009, the station changed call letters to KESJ and began airing ESPN Radio. It was an affiliate of the St. Louis Cardinals, Missouri Tigers, and Northwest Missouri State University sports. An FM translator came on air in 2019 on 107.5 MHz.

The station adopted its current format and branding on August 22, 2019. The station primarily airs classic hits from the 1980s through 1990s. It gained the slogan "JoeTown 107-5", using the translator dial position. The station airs much of the music previously heard on sister-station KKJO. It also features former KKJO staples DJ Gregg Lynn and "Super 70s Saturday Night."

== Previous logo ==
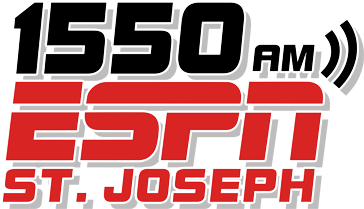
