= Mass media in Kansas City, Missouri =

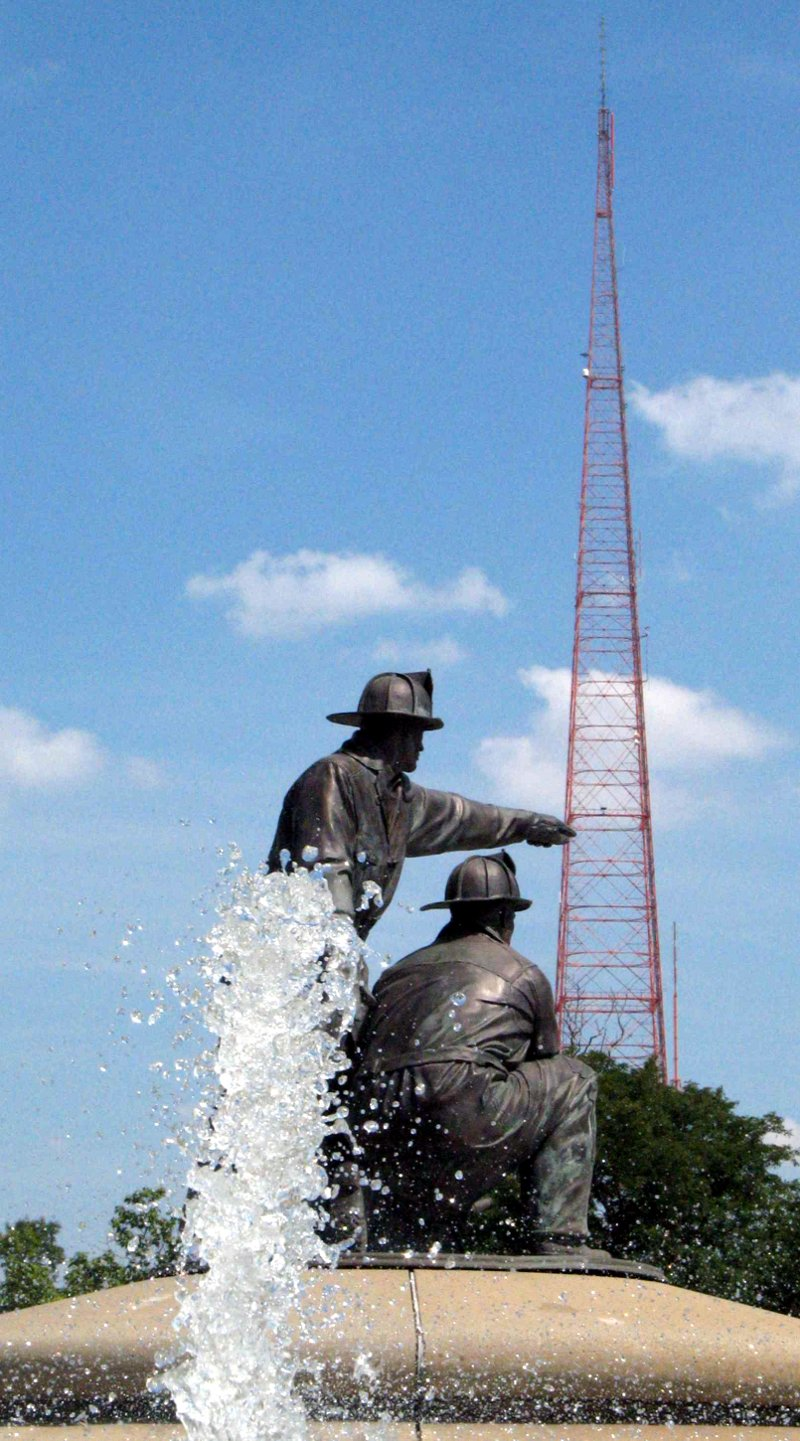
Landmark KCTV-TV tower on 31st Street on Union Hill, with the Firefighters Fountain in foreground

The following media outlets serve Kansas City, Missouri and the surrounding Kansas City metropolitan area.

== Print ==
=== Magazines ===
- Camp Magazine, local LGBT news, monthly
- The Independent (1899—present), Kansas City, Kansas magazine
- Ingram's Magazine, local business news, monthly
- Our Health Matters, health and wellness, bi-monthly
- Spaces Kansas City, lifestyle and entertainment, bi-monthly

=== Newspapers ===
The Kansas City Star is the city's primary newspaper, published daily.

Other papers published in the city include:

- The Call, local African-American news, weekly
- Kansas City Business Journal, business news, weekly
- The Kansas City Globe, local African-American news, weekly
- Kansas City Hispanic News, local Hispanic news, weekly
- Metro Voice Newspaper, local Christian digital news
- National Catholic Reporter, Roman Catholic news, bi-weekly
- Northeast News, Northeast Kansas City neighborhood news, weekly
- The Pitch, alternative newspaper, weekly
- University News, University of Missouri–Kansas City student newspaper, weekly

== TV ==
Kansas City is the second largest television media market in the state of Missouri after St. Louis, and, as ranked by population by Arbitron, the 32nd largest market in the United States.

The following is a list of television stations that broadcast from and/or are licensed to Kansas City, Missouri.

=== Full-power ===
- 4 WDAF-TV Kansas City (Fox)
- 5 KCTV Kansas City (CBS)
- 9 KMBC-TV Kansas City (ABC)
- 19 KCPT Kansas City (PBS)
- 29 KCWE Kansas City (The CW)
- 38 KMCI-TV Lawrence (Independent)
- 41 KSHB-TV Kansas City (NBC)
- 50 KPXE-TV Kansas City (Ion Television)
- 62 KSMO-TV Kansas City (MyNetworkTV)

=== Low-power ===
- 20 KUKC-LD Kansas City (Univision)
- 25 KMJC-LD Louisburg, Kansas (Buzzr)
- 43 KCDN-LD Kansas City (Daystar)*
- 45 K15MB-D Kansas City (HSN)

=== Cable ===
- FanDuel Sports Network Kansas City
- Spectrum News 1 Kansas City

== Radio ==
Kansas City is the 32nd largest radio market (as determined by Arbitron). As of 2024, Kansas City is the largest radio market without any radio stations owned or operated by iHeartMedia. Several radio stations cover the Kansas City area, including:

=== FM ===
- 88.5 KJNW Kansas City (Contemporary Christian)*
- 89.3 KCUR-FM Kansas City (NPR)*
- 90.1 KKFI Kansas City (Variety)*
- 90.7 KJHK Lawrence, Kansas (Campus/variety/alternative)*
- 90.9 KTBG Warrensburg (NPR/alternative)*
- 91.5 KANU Lawrence (NPR/classical)*
- 91.9 KWJC Liberty (Classical music)*
- 92.3 KCCV Olathe, Kansas (Bott Radio)*
- 93.3 KMXV Kansas City (Contemporary hits)
- 94.1 KFKF-FM Kansas City, Kansas (Country)
- 95.7 KCHZ Ottawa, Kansas (Talk radio)
- 96.1 KLRQ Clinton (K-Love)*
- 96.5 KFNZ-FM Kansas City (Sports)
- 97.3 KLRX Lee's Summit (K-Love)*
- 97.7 KPOW-FM La Monte (Classic hits)
- 98.1 KMBZ-FM Kansas City (Talk radio)
- 98.9 KQRC-FM Leavenworth, Kansas (Rock)
- 99.7 KZPT Kansas City (Adult contemporary)
- 100.1 KKWK Cameron (Adult contemporary)
- 100.3 KDVV Topeka, Kansas (Album-oriented rock)
- 100.7 KMZU Carrollton (Country)
- 101.1 KCFX Harrisonville (Classic rock)
- 102.1 KCKC Kansas City (Adult hits)
- 103.3 KPRS Kansas City (Urban contemporary)
- 103.9 KRLI Malta Bend (Classic country)
- 104.3 KBEQ-FM Kansas City (Country)
- 105.1 KCJK Garden City (Urban Contemporary)
- 105.5 KKJO-FM St. Joseph (Adult contemporary)
- 105.9 KKSW Lawrence, Kansas (Contemporary hits)
- 106.5 WDAF-FM Liberty (Country)
- 107.3 KMJK North Kansas City (Urban adult contemporary)
- 107.7 KMAJ Shawnee, Kansas (Adult contemporary)

=== AM ===
- 580 WIBW Topeka, Kansas (Talk)
- 610 KFNZ Kansas City (Sports)
- 680 KFEQ St. Joseph (Talk)
- 710 KCMO Kansas City (Talk)
- 760 KCCV Kansas City (Bott Radio)
- 810 WHB Kansas City (Sports)
- 890 KMVG Gladstone (EWTN Radio)*
- 980 KMBZ Kansas City (Talk)
- 1030 KCWJ Blue Springs (Classic country)
- 1090 KEXS Excelsior Springs (EWTN Radio)*
- 1140 KCXL Liberty (Talk/brokered/Radio Sputnik)
- 1160 KCTO Cleveland (Spanish Christian)
- 1190 KDMR Kansas City (EWTN Radio)*
- 1250 KYYS Kansas City, Kansas (Regional Mexican)
- 1340 KDTD Kansas City, Kansas (Regional Mexican)
- 1380 KCNW Fairway, Kansas (Christian)
- 1410 KKLO Leavenworth, Kansas (Talk)
- 1480 KCZZ Mission, Kansas (Regional Mexican)
- 1510 KCTE Independence (Sports)
- 1550 KESJ St. Joseph (Classic hits)
- 1590 KPRT Kansas City (Urban contemporary gospel)
- 1660 KWOD Kansas City, Kansas (Sports)

== Notable personalities ==
- Walt Bodine
- Walter Cronkite
- Harris Faulkner
- Rush Limbaugh
- Mancow Muller
