= WDAF =

WDAF may refer to:

- WDAF-TV, a television station (channel 4) licensed to Kansas City, Missouri, United States
- WDAF-FM, a radio station (106.5 FM) licensed to Liberty, Missouri, United States
- KCKC, a radio station (102.1 FM) licensed to Kansas City, Missouri, United States, used WDAF-FM callsign from 1961 to 1974
- KFNZ (AM), a radio station (610 AM) licensed to Kansas City, Missouri, United States, used WDAF callsign from 1922 to 2003
- KWOD, a radio station (1660 AM) licensed to Kansas City, Kansas, United States, briefly used WDAF callsign in 2007
