= KUDL (disambiguation) =

KUDL is a radio station (106.5 FM) in Sacramento, California.

KUDL may also refer to:

- KWOD, a radio station (1660 AM) licensed to Kansas City, Kansas, United States, known as KUDL from 2011 to 2014
- KMBZ-FM, a radio station (98.1 FM) licensed to Kansas City, Kansas, United States, known as KUDL-FM and KUDL from 1969 to 2011
- KCNW, a radio station (1380 AM) licensed to Fairway, Kansas, United States, known as KUDL from 1953 to 1975
