= KMBZ =

KMBZ may refer to:

- KMBZ (AM), a radio station (980 AM) licensed to Kansas City, Missouri, United States
- KMBZ-FM, a radio station (98.1 FM) licensed to Kansas City, Kansas, United States
