= KFNZ =

KFNZ may refer to:

- KFNZ (AM), a radio station (610 AM) licensed to serve Kansas City, Missouri, United States
- KFNZ-FM, a radio station (96.5 FM) licensed to serve Kansas City, Missouri, United States
- KJHF, a radio station (103.1 FM) licensed to serve Kualapuu, Hawaii, United States, which held the call sign KFNZ from 2018 to 2019
- KNIT (AM), a radio station (1320 AM) licensed to serve Salt Lake City, Utah, United States, which held the call sign KFNZ from 1996 to 2017
