= KBEQ-FM =

Country music radio station in Kansas City

Coordinates: 39.083°N 94.481°W

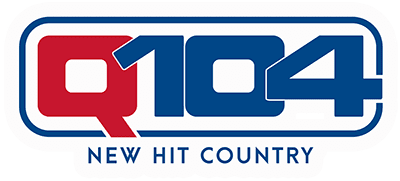
- Kansas City, Missouri; United States
- Broadcast area: Kansas City metropolitan area
- Frequency: 104.3 MHz
- Branding: Q104

Programming
- Language: English
- Format: Country music

Ownership
- Owner: Steel City Media; (MGTF Media Company, LLC)
- Sister stations: KCKC; KFKF-FM; KMXV

History
- First air date: November 1960 (as KBEY); August 15, 1973 (as KBEQ)
- Former call signs: KBEY (1960–1973)
- Call sign meaning: KBE = KBEY and KBEA; Q = used in Q104 branding

Technical information
- Licensing authority: FCC
- Facility ID: 48961
- Class: C0
- ERP: 99,000 watts (100,000 with beam tilt)
- HAAT: 301 meters (988 ft)

Links
- Public license information: Public file; LMS
- Webcast: Listen Live
- Website: q104kc.com

KBEQ-FM (104.3 FM, "Q104") is a commercial radio station in Kansas City, Missouri, serving the Kansas City metropolitan area market. It is owned by Steel City Media and airs a country music format. The station's studios and offices are located on Mill Street at Westport Center in Midtown Kansas City.

The transmitter site is on the East Side of Kansas City, off Stark Avenue and 23rd Street South. KBEQ has an effective radiated power (ERP) of 99,000 watts (100,000 with beam tilt).

== History ==
=== Early years (1960–1973) ===
In November 1960, the station signed on the air as KBEY, the FM counterpart to AM station KBEA (1480 AM, now KCZZ) in nearby Mission, Kansas. It had an effective radiated power of 17,500 watts. KBEY played big band and easy listening music, running a no-announcer broadcast automation system.

In 1970, KBEY was acquired by Intermedia, Inc., a division of Interstate Securities Corp. The division was managed by Mark Wodlinger, former manager of KMBC-TV, where he convinced Len Dawson to do TV sports. In 1972, Intermedia decided to divest itself from the radio business and keep only its main asset, KQTV in St. Joseph. Bob Ingram bought KBEA, while KBEY was purchased by Mark and Connie Wodlinger.

KBEY switched to "underground" rock in August 1970, playing cuts from albums including blues music, folk music and rock, with some classical music and jazz. Another FM station, KUDL's sister FM KCJC, had recently ended its underground format, so KBEY decided to fill the void. One of KCJC's longtime DJs, "Little Willie", was part of the first KBEY air staff. KBEY's progressive rock format began with 20 hours of music played on the old automation system, and four hours live each evening with Bill Scott, until an air staff could be assembled. Unfortunately, in Scott's previous job, he was a DJ using the name "Robert W. Walker" ("El Walkero") on KUDL and he had a non-compete clause in his previous contract. He assumed this restriction was for the character while KUDL asserted it was for him, personally. Within a few weeks, KUDL sued and he was forced to leave the job on KBEY.

KBEY became an ABC FM network affiliate to fulfill most of its news obligation, but devoted minimum time to news and talk, focusing on new, unique, and classic music. In 1971, KBEY devoted the midnight to 6 am time slot to jazz, hosted by Bobby Kline, which developed a sizable following over the next couple of years. The progressive format was more successful than is often assumed. There was networking among similar stations, like KSHE St. Louis, and KSAN San Francisco, sharing programming content. The "format" evolved over three years and consistently claimed 8-12% of the KC audience, a respectable share in a market with around thirty stations. Eventually, though, progressive radio found itself fading at the same moment that San Diego's "Super Q" format was sweeping the country. Mark Wodlinger knew it would hit Kansas City soon, and whatever station adopted the format would likely be #1 in the ratings for at least a couple of years. He arranged the deal, made the announcement, and began a two-month KBEY-KBEQ transition process to bring in the new format with its new air staff, with the progressive rock/jazz experiment ending in August, like it started.

=== Top 40 (1973–1993) ===
On August 15, 1973, with the growing popularity of FM radio, KBEY ended the progressive rock format and switched to contemporary hit radio as "Super-Q, Q-104". It was modeled after San Diego Top 40 station KCBQ's "Super Q" format, a format that was growing across the country at the time. KBEY's call sign changed to KBEQ, and adopted the slogan "Super-Q Plays Favorites". Q-104 gradually chipped away at Kansas City's powerhouse AM Top 40 station, WHB. Public service announcements were called "Q Tips".

A "Super-Q" phone-in contest had become popular in San Diego, tying up the city's telephone network (a dangerous problem the station publicized wildly). It was replicated on a smaller scale in Kansas City. The large number of listeners hurriedly dialing the station's number for the contest would create many wrong numbers. That prompted Southwestern Bell in Kansas City to respond in the same way as other cities, by creating a new phone exchange just for radio, TV and other entities that might suddenly get large numbers of calls. The three-number exchange was unique, so there would be few or no wrong numbers. KBEQ jammed the lines with its "Treasure Hunt" contest. So Southwestern Bell assigned KBEQ Kansas City's first 576-7xxx number. It was (816) 576-7104, but the 576-7xxx system worked in the 913 area code too, covering both Missouri and Kansas-based stations in the Kansas City metro area.

Previously, the only way many FM radio station owners could make a profit was to lease 10% of the signal out for a subsidiary communications authority (SCA) channel. Muzak was a huge customer, using FM stations to broadcast "elevator music" to banks, restaurants and stores. Mark Wodlinger recognized the value of this service, and brought AgReports to Kansas City, using the 103.3 subcarrier of KPRS by contract. Up to 80 miles away, a grain elevator would hoist an antenna to the roof and pick up a constant stream of up-to-the minute commodity prices. At first, reports came by voice on a McMartin SCA table radio, with formatted note pads included to jot prices on. Soon, the stream went digital and the output was a TV screen full of scrolling prices. Then, Wodlinger brought in a medical radio network, free to doctors, with ad-supported medical talk radio all day, broadcast on KBEQ's own SCA channel.

After about five years, the Wodlingers sold KBEQ. They later bought an FM station in Leavenworth, Kansas on 98.9, moving the transmitter to Basehor and raising the power so it would cover the Kansas City radio market. (This would later become active rock station KQRC). Mariner Communications bought KBEQ in 1977.

Initially, Q-104's studios were in Kansas City, Kansas, at 55th and Metropolitan, then at River Quay, then at PennTower (31st and Broadway in Kansas City, Missouri) and eventually at Country Club Plaza. Some of the DJs during this era included Pat McKay, Bill Bailey (formerly of WLS Chicago), Mike O'Brien (one of the original Q staff, on the air on day one), Steve Garrett, Johnny Rockin' Rowlands, Bobby Ocean, Young Bobby Day, Chuck Nasty (known as Charmin' Chuck Harmon), Johnny Dare, Doug Billings, Jim (the Boomer) Cambron - the day one overnight DJ, and Randy Miller. Many came from other cities for the job and stayed in the market. Former KBEY DJs Bobby Kline and Art Hadley (Arthur Lee) eventually joined the airstaff. WHB eventually ended its Top 40 format, turning to oldies in 1985, while KBKC/KCPW, which were both located on 94.9 FM, would also flip to oldies itself in 1989. By the end of the decade, KBEQ was Kansas City's only Top 40 station.

In the 1980s, KBEQ's power had increased to 50,000 watts. By the 1990s, it was increased again, to its current 100,000 watts.

In October 1987, Noble Broadcasting acquired KBEQ-FM.

In 1992, KBEQ began airing alternative rock during the evening hours under the name "Planet Q". The show was hosted by Steve Barnes, who would later move to WNNX in Atlanta during its successful alternative format.

=== Country (1993–present) ===
During its run as a Top 40 station, KBEQ became one of the market's most popular stations throughout the 1970s and 1980s. In the summer of 1987, KBEQ was the top-rated station in the market; in the fall of 1989, the station attracted more than 10 percent of all radio listening in the Kansas City market.

By the early 1990s, however, country music's popularity increased in Kansas City and throughout the nation, while the Top 40 format was in a state of decline. In addition, rimshot station KXXR flipped to a Top 40/CHR format in 1990, pulling younger listeners away from KBEQ. From the spring of 1990 to the spring of 1992, KBEQ lost 60 percent of its audience; in the Fall 1992 ratings for the market, KBEQ would sink to 12th place (6+). On February 1, 1993, KBEQ began running a promotion called "20 years in 20 days", playing music that was popular in their Top 40 heyday. At 5 p.m. on February 19, after playing "End of the Road" by Boyz II Men, KBEQ abruptly flipped to country as "Young Country 104". The first song under the new format was "Young Country" by Hank Williams, Jr. This left Kansas City without a full city-grade Top 40 station until the following year, when future-sister station KMXV flipped from hot adult contemporary to Top 40. In March 1995, EZ Communications, the same company that owned competitor KFKF, bought KBEQ.

By July 1996, KBEQ rebranded as "Young Country Q104" as a nod to the station's previous Top 40 legacy. In April 1997, KBEQ was acquired by American Radio Systems. Westinghouse/CBS bought American Radio Systems' stations (including KBEQ) on September 19, 1997. In June 1998, CBS split off the radio division under the revived Infinity Broadcasting name, which would be renamed CBS Radio in December 2005.

In 2001, KBEQ dropped the "Young Country" portion of its branding and began simply using the moniker "Q104". The station also changed its logo to mirror its former Top 40 logo.

In 2019, KBEQ introduced a new morning show for the first time in over 20 years, launching "The Morning Drive" with Mike Kellar and Jenny Matthews. Kellar was on the previous morning show alongside Zeke Montana and Jillian Gregg, while Matthews joined from sister station KMXV. Since the debut, KBEQ has seen its highest ratings in over 10 years.

=== Wilks and Steel City ownership ===
In November 2006, CBS sold KBEQ to Wilks Broadcasting as part of a nationwide reduction of radio stations by CBS. On June 12, 2014, Wilks announced that they would be selling its Kansas City cluster, including KBEQ, to Pittsburgh-based Steel City Media. The sale was approved on September 26, and was consummated on September 30.

Steel City owns two Kansas City country stations: the younger-appealing KBEQ and the more mainstream KFKF.
