= KMBC (disambiguation) =

KMBC may refer to:

- KMBC-TV, a television station (virtual channel 9) licensed to Kansas City, Missouri, United States
- KMBZ (AM), a radio station (980 AM) licensed to Kansas City, Missouri, which held the call sign KMBC from 1928 to 1967
- KZPT (FM), a radio station (99.7 FM) licensed to Kansas City, Missouri, which held the call sign KMBC-FM from 1962 to 1967
- Kentucky Mountain Bible College
- Knowsley Metropolitan Borough Council
