= List of Kansas City Chiefs broadcasters =

The following is a synopsis of radio and television broadcast outlets for the Kansas City Chiefs, a franchise from the National Football League.

== Radio ==
Kansas City Chiefs radio play-by-play announcers
1960–1962	Charlie Jones
1963	Merle Harmon
1964–1970	Tom Hedrick
1971–1973	Dick Carlson
1974–1975	Ray Scott
1976	Al Wisk
1977	Tom Hopkins
1978–1984	Wayne Larrivee
1985–1993	Kevin Harlan
1994–present	Mitch Holthus

From the team’s arrival in Kansas City in 1963 until 1989, KCMO (then at 810 AM) served as the Chiefs’ flagship. From 1989 until the end of the 2019 season, Cumulus Media's KCFX (101.1), a.k.a. "101 The Fox", broadcast all Chiefs games on FM radio under the moniker of The Chiefs Fox Football Radio Network, one of the earliest deals where an FM station served as the flagship station of a team radio network. Since 1994, Mitch Holthus has served as play-by-play announcer. Former Chiefs quarterback Len Dawson served alongside Holthus for color commentary but starting in the 2016 season, Dawson's role was slowly minimized as he announced his retirement from broadcasting, with Kendall Gammon succeeding him as the color analyst. The Chiefs and KCFX was the longest-lasting FM radio broadcast partnering tenure in the NFL.

With the start of the 2020 season, WDAF-FM (106.5 FM) became the flagship of the Chiefs network, with sister station KCSP (610 AM) carrying surrounding analysis and team interview programming as well as selected simulcasts of live games, and the Audacy app streaming coverage of all games online on desktops/laptops only. Danan Hughes replaced Gammon as the color analyst alongside Holthus, with Josh Klingler serving as sideline reporter. Games are available via the app, but only within the Chiefs' market which is western Missouri and eastern Kansas. Games are also available outside of the team market, as with all 32 teams, through a subscription to SiriusXM (satellite radio or Internet) or NFL+. The network's personnel, outside those exclusively contracted to Cumulus, were expected to be retained with the new Entercom contract. Beginning with the 2024 season, Chiefs games are broadcast on KFNZ (AM) and KFNZ-FM, also known as 610 and 96.5 The Fan. WDAF-FM simulcast Chiefs games during the 2024 season.

=== Radio affiliates ===
Chiefs games are primarily broadcast in Missouri and Kansas, where most of the team's fans are located. Games are broadcast in a total of 13 states, including Colorado, Illinois, Iowa, Kentucky, Louisiana, Oklahoma, Nebraska, New Mexico, Arkansas, Texas, and South Dakota. In total, 63 cities outside of Missouri and Kansas broadcast games. In accordance with NFL exclusivity rules surrounding Westwood One broadcasts, all AFC Championship and Super Bowl broadcasts are not syndicated outside of KFNZ-AM and KFNZ-FM. Stations in major cities are listed below.

City	Call sign	Frequency
Kansas City, Missouri	KFNZ-FM; KFNZ	96.5 FM; 610 AM
St. Louis, Missouri	KMOX	1120 AM/104.1 FM
Jefferson City, Missouri	KCMQ	96.7 FM
Springfield, Missouri	KKLH	104.7 FM
Springfield, Missouri	KGMY	1400 AM
Joplin, Missouri / Pittsburg, Kansas	KKOW	860 AM
Manhattan, Kansas	KMAN	1350 AM
Salina, Kansas	KINA	910 AM/107.5 FM
Salina, Kansas	KSKG	99.9 FM
Topeka, Kansas	WIBW	580 AM/104.9 FM
Wichita, Kansas	KNSS	98.7 FM
Hutchinson, Kansas	KWBW	1450 AM/98.5 FM
Emporia, Kansas	KVOE-FM	101.7 FM
Des Moines, Iowa	KBGG	1700 AM
Omaha, Nebraska	KXSP	590 AM
Lubbock, Texas	KKCL-FM	98.1 FM

== Television ==
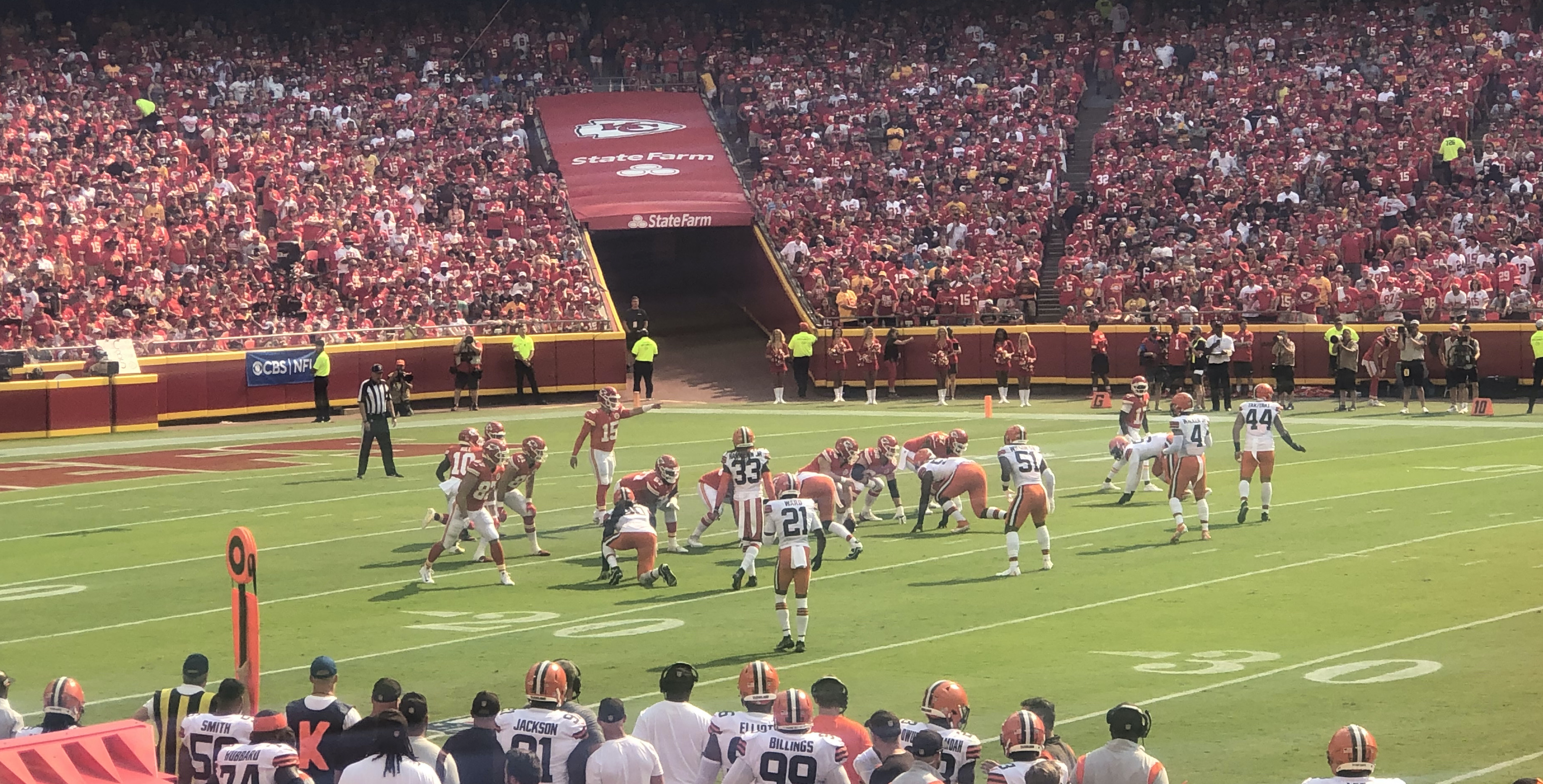
The Chiefs hosting the Browns in the 2021 season opener. The NFL on CBS banner hangs in view of the broadcast cameras, on the sideline.

CBS and Fox are the main stations that broadcast Chiefs games that aren't primetime. The team's primary markets outside of Kansas City include the metropolitan areas of Wichita and Omaha.

Prior to the 1994 season, WDAF was the primary station for the Chiefs as an NBC affiliate (they aired on KMBC when ABC had the AFL package through 1964), since NBC had the AFC package. The inter-conference home games aired on KCTV starting in 1973 (when the NFL allowed local telecasts of home games). After week one of the 1994 season, WDAF switched to Fox (which got the NFC package), and has aired the Chiefs' inter-conference home games since. The bulk of the team's games moved to KSHB through the end of the 1997 season. Since that time, they have aired on KCTV, save for the 2015 Week 17 game vs. the Oakland Raiders, which aired on WDAF when the NFL cross-flexed the game from CBS to FOX.

=== Preseason game affiliates ===
Preseason games are broadcast throughout the majority of the states of Missouri and Kansas, as well as portions of Nebraska, Iowa, Oklahoma and Arkansas. Nearby major cities besides Kansas City with broadcasts include Wichita, Des Moines, Tulsa, and Lincoln.

Metro area	Call sign	Affiliation
Kansas City metro	KSHB-TV	NBC
Columbia, Missouri; Jefferson City, Missouri	KMIZ / KQFX / KZOU	ABC / FOX / MyTV
Des Moines, Iowa; Ames, Iowa	KDSM	FOX
Ft. Smith, Arkansas; Fayetteville, Arkansas; Springdale, Arkansas; Rogers, Arkansas	KNWA / KFTA	NBC / FOX
Joplin, Missouri; Pittsburg, Kansas	KODE / KSNF	ABC / NBC
Lincoln, Nebraska; Hastings, Nebraska; Kearney, Nebraska	KFXL / KHGI	FOX / ABC
Ottumwa, Iowa; Kirksville, Missouri	KTVO / KTVO 3.2	CBS / ABC
Springfield, Missouri	KOLR / KOZL	CBS / Indy
St. Joseph, Missouri	KQTV	ABC
Topeka, Kansas	WIBW / EIBW	CBS / MyTV
Tulsa, Oklahoma	KOTV / KQCW	CBS / CW
Wichita metro Ensign, Kansas; Hays, Kansas; Goodland, Kansas	KWCH / KSCW-DT / KDCU	CBS / CW / Univision
