= KFKU =

Radio station of the University of Kansas (1924–1987)

- Lawrence, Kansas; United States
- Frequency: 1250 kHz

Ownership
- Owner: University of Kansas

History
- First air date: December 15, 1924
- Last air date: September 2, 1987
- Former frequencies: 1090 kHz (1924–1927); 1180 kHz (1927–1928); 1220 kHz (1928–1940)
- Call sign meaning: "Kansas University"

Technical information
- Facility ID: 66569
- Power: 5,000 watts

KFKU was a Lawrence, Kansas AM radio station. It was licensed to the University of Kansas from its founding in 1924, until its suspension of operations in 1987 and deletion in 1996.

== History ==
KFKU was first licensed on December 18, 1924, to the University of Kansas at Lawrence, for 500 watts on 1090 kHz. Its establishment was financed by a $20,000 grant from the engineering faculty. The station's debut broadcast on December 15 coincided with the "third annual radio night", and featured a concert by the KU band and a speech by Chancellor Ernest Lindley.

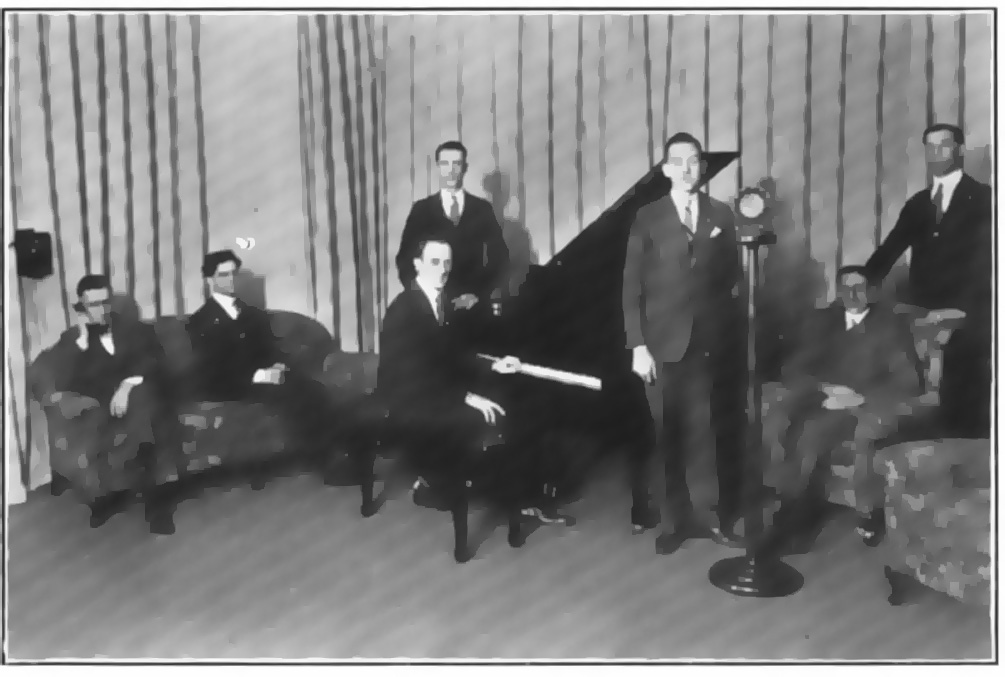
University's radio program committee, photographed in the KFKU studio (1925)

Initial programming ran on Monday and Thursday nights and included lectures complementing correspondence courses in areas such as philosophy and Spanish, as well as special events such as commencement and basketball games.

In mid-1927, KFKU was assigned to share its frequency with recently licensed WREN, also located in Lawrence, which had been set up to promote Jenny Wren flour. This had been proposed by R. C. Jackman, the founder of WREN, which was initially assigned to share time with WIBW in Topeka. Jackman suggested that KFKU was a more logical timeshare partner, as both stations were located in the same community. KFKU and WREN were moved to 1180 on a timesharing basis on June 1. Although KFKU was licensed for 500 watts, it broadcast at 1,000 using WREN's transmission equipment, originally located in the storage room of the Bowersock Mills and Power Company.

Frequency reallocations moved KFKU and WREN to 1220 kHz in 1928, under the provisions of the Federal Radio Commission's General Order 40, and to 1250 kHz with the 1941 implementation of the North American Regional Broadcasting Agreement by the Federal Communications Commission. By 1935, KFKU and WREN were broadcasting during the day with 5,000 watts. A nighttime power increase followed in 1948, using a directional antenna to protect WMAW in Milwaukee.

By the late 1940s, the KFKU-WREN time sharing agreement was described as "not a happy one"; KFKU broadcast for just an hour daily. A defunct FM station in Hutchinson donated its equipment to the university, and in 1952, the sign-on of KANU created a new primary outlet for KU's radio programming. Ultimately, KFKU's broadcasts were diminished to an hour, and later thirty minutes, with WREN operating at all other times. After 1959, KFKU's programs were simulcasts of KANU. WREN was unwilling to give the university more airtime, on the grounds that KFKU's broadcasts resulted in ratings drops for WREN.

KFKU relied on WREN's broadcasting equipment to transmit for almost all of its history, effectively making it a phantom radio station. Therefore, shared-time operation was suspended after more than 60 years, when financial difficulties temporarily silenced WREN, beginning on September 2, 1987. WREN resumed broadcasting the next year, but KFKU remained off the air. The university indicated at the time that it intended to return to the air alongside WREN, though there was little internal interest in taking over the facility on a full-time basis. On December 9, 1991, WREN returned to the air alone on 1250 kHz.

In 1996, owing to the length of silence and the university's failure to respond to FCC letters, potentially thinking it had already surrendered the station, KFKU's license was designated for hearing and ultimately canceled.

In 2006, one of the last physical vestiges of KFKU, the tower behind Marvin Hall used for early transmissions and later to transmit student-run KJHK, was damaged by a wind storm that bent some of the tower's supports and damaged the feed line to KJHK. KJHK's antenna was relocated, and the university dismantled the tower as a result of the damage sustained.
