= Walt Bodine =

American radio and television broadcaster

- Born: August 27, 1920; Kansas City, Missouri
- Died: March 24, 2013 (aged 92); Prairie Village, Kansas
- Occupation(s): Radio and television broadcaster Author
- Years active: 1940–2012
- Spouse: Bernadine (died 2003)
- Children: Five

Walton Marshall Bodine (August 27, 1920 – March 24, 2013) was an American broadcaster and author most notable for his career in Kansas City, Missouri. Better known as Walt, he was a fixture in Kansas City broadcasting for seven decades. Still broadcasting into his nineties, Bodine hosted the talk radio show The Walt Bodine Show on KCUR, the Kansas City area's NPR member station from 1983 to 2012. His final broadcast was April 27, 2012.

== Early life ==
Walt Bodine was born in Kansas City, Missouri, the only child of Walton Martin and Mary Ethyl (née Gilmore) Bodine. His father was a pharmacist, prompting the family to move several times around the Kansas City area in Walt's youth until settling in the neighborhood around Linwood and Troost streets. He began working at his father's pharmacy as a teenager, a business that served the neighborhood as well as the famous and the notorious. Comedian Red Skelton was a customer, as was Kansas City gangster Johnny Lazia, the latter on the same evening he was assassinated in 1934. Walt Bodine's first experience with broadcasting came as a child when he appeared on a Kansas City radio station at age eight, performing a novelty song with his aunt. Bodine attended Westport High School, graduating in 1938. While there he participated in drama classes, learning skills that would prove valuable in his later broadcasting career. After high school he attended Jewish Community Center's Resident Theater, intending to become an actor. However the school closed after he had attended just one year.

== Career ==
With his dreams of an acting career dashed by the closure of his theater school, friends suggested Walt Bodine consider a job in radio. A neighbor, Guy Ruyon, worked in radio already and became Bodine's mentor. In 1940 his first job in broadcasting came at KDRO, a new low-power AM station in Sedalia, Missouri. The job in Sedalia didn't last long however as Bodine was fired within a few months for mispronouncing the name of baseball player Joe DiMaggio during a sportscast. Bodine next moved on to KVAK in Atchison, Kansas. After almost a year in Atchison Walt Bodine took a position with KCKN, a station in Kansas City, Kansas owned by the Kansas City Kansan newspaper. By this time the United States was involved in World War II and Walt Bodine answered Uncle Sam's call to do his part. Bodine joined the U.S. Maritime Service. Stationed in Port Arthur, Texas, Walt Bodine still managed to stay busy in radio during off duty hours by working part-time at KPAC. Returning home to Kansas City after the war, he resumed his career at KCKN before receiving an offer for another station in town, WDAF.

Walt Bodine spent nearly twenty years at WDAF, working on both the radio and television station (WDAF-TV), as a news anchor, host, and eventually news director. He left WDAF in 1965, moving to WHB radio, hosting the popular "Night Beat" call-in and interview program from 1965 to 1974, and also becoming news director at television station KCIT from 1969 until 1971. In the 1970s Bodine moved into the advertising business for a short time, working in sales for the Fremerman-Papin agency. He soon returned to his first love, broadcasting. On KBMA television, he was host of "Bodine's Beat" and "41 Thirty" from the mid-1970s until the mid-1980s. The first incarnation of the long-running Walt Bodine Show began on KMBZ radio in 1978 and remained there through 1982. Bodine began working for KMBC-TV in 1982 and remained there as a commentator through 2001. Kansas City's National Public Radio station, KCUR, became Walt's final radio home in 1983 as he broadcast there until his retirement on April 27, 2012.

Walt Bodine was an eyewitness to and voice of information through many notable events in Kansas City history. Among them the 1951 Kansas City flood, the 1957 Ruskin Heights tornado, the race riot of 1968, and the 1981 Hyatt Regency skywalk collapse. Many Kansas Citians remember how on the night of the Hyatt Skywalk disaster Bodine stayed on the air all night providing news updates and taking calls from grief-stricken citizens. Given several chances to move on to larger broadcasting markets like St. Louis, Missouri and Los Angeles, California he always eschewed them in favor of remaining in his hometown.

In addition to broadcasting, Walt Bodine wrote frequent newspaper columns or Op-Ed piece for The Squire newspaper through the years on a multitude of subjects. He also authored or co-wrote several books including Right Here in River City: A portrait of Kansas City with Tracy Thomas in 1976(ISBN 0385007132), What Do You Say To That?, published in 1989, and 2003's My Times, My Town.(ISBN 0974601241).

In My Times, My Town Bodine commented on the philosophy behind the stories he has covered during his career:

For too long news directors have operated on the theory, 'If it bleeds, it leads.' Maybe they should consider that the audience requires something more than blood and gore and sex. Can it really be that the only thing that interests us is human misbehavior? ...Emphasis put on the daily bucket of blood does nothing to answer the broad array of serious problems facing the nation, the states and the city.

== Final years ==
Walt Bodine's broadcasting career was increasingly affected by poor health in the first decade of the 21st century. Retinitis pigmentosa left him blind and worn out knees confined him to a wheelchair. In his final years, he also suffered memory loss. Bodine had scaled back his radio show appearances since 2010, hosting the show only on Fridays. Finally in April, 2012 he made final radio broadcast and sign-off. His wife Bernadine died in 2003. Bodine spent his final days at an assisted living center in Prairie Village, Kansas. Walt Bodine died at the assisted living center on March 24, 2013. His body was donated to the University of Kansas Medical Center for use in scientific research.

== Awards ==
Bodine has received several awards, including:

- Truman Community Service Award for 2005 from the city of Independence, Missouri
- Bishop John J. Sullivan Award for Communications from Catholic Charities of Kansas City-Saint Joseph
- Kansas City Spirit Award for 1987
- "Outstanding Kansas Citian of the Year - 1990" from the Native Sons and Daughters of Greater Kansas City
