= KQRC-FM =

- Leavenworth, Kansas; United States
- Broadcast area: Kansas City metropolitan area
- Frequency: 98.9 MHz (HD Radio)
- Branding: 98.9 The Rock!

Programming
- Language: English
- Format: Active rock
- Affiliations: Compass Media Networks; United Stations Radio Networks

Ownership
- Owner: Audacy, Inc.; (Audacy License, LLC)
- Sister stations: KFNZ; KFNZ-FM; KMBZ; KMBZ-FM; KWOD; KYYS; KZPT; WDAF-FM

History
- First air date: 1962; 64 years ago
- Former call signs: KCLO-FM (1962–1979); KTRO (1979–1982); KZZC (1982–1987); KCWV (1987–1989); KRVK (1989–1992)
- Call sign meaning: "Rock"

Technical information
- Licensing authority: FCC
- Facility ID: 74101
- Class: C0
- ERP: 100,000 watts
- HAAT: 335 meters (1,099 ft)
- Transmitter coordinates: 39.022°N 94.514°W

Links
- Public license information: Public file; LMS
- Webcast: Listen live (via Audacy)
- Website: www.audacy.com/989therock

KQRC-FM (98.9 MHz, "98-9 The Rock") is a radio station licensed to Leavenworth, Kansas and serving the Kansas City metropolitan area. Its studios are located in Mission, Kansas, and its transmitter site is in South Kansas City. The station is owned by Audacy, Inc.

== History ==
=== 1962–1979: KCLO-FM ===
The 98.9 MHz frequency shuffled between formats when it first went on the air in 1962. Licensed to Leavenworth, the station began as KCLO-FM, a religious-MOR outlet simulcasting with its AM sister station on 1410.

=== 1979–1982: KTRO ===
In 1979, it became a country station as KTRO.

=== 1982–1986: KZZC ===
Mark and Connie Wodlinger, the former owners of Top 40 outlet KBEQ-FM, bought KTRO in late 1982. In December of that year, KTRO began targeting the larger Kansas City market by flipping to a Top 40 format as "ZZ 99", KZZC. KZZC competed heavily against KBEQ by emphasizing on newer music in comparison to KBEQ's oldies lean. The station also was home to Kansas City legendary DJ Randy Miller in morning drive. During this time, the station's transmitter was relocated to a site near Basehor in Wyandotte County to improve coverage. On August 25, 1986, due to financial trouble, the station flipped to a syndicated oldies outlet as "98.9 Gold" with the KZZC call letters still in place. In August 1987, the station's transmitter moved again, this time to the KCTV Tower.

=== 1987–1989: KCWV ===
On September 24, 1987, at noon, "98.9 The Wave" debuted with a new age (a precursor to the smooth jazz format) and easy listening format, competing with a multitude of AC stations. The call letters were also changed to KCWV. In May 1989, Wodlinger Broadcasting sold the station to Journal Broadcast Group for $6 million.

=== 1989–1992: KRVK ===
On October 27, 1989, at 5:37 p.m., the station flipped to soft rock as KRVK, "98.9 The River". The station featured a talented line up on-air personalities who were compelled to speak in a laid-back, low-key restrained manner. The "River" format was the failed concept of radio consultant Eldon Karl Foulks Jr. (from E. Karl Broadcast Consulting) and Doug Kiel, Vice-Chairman and CEO of the Journal Broadcast Group. Dismal ratings plagued the station during its brief run.

=== 1992–present: KQRC ===
On April 3, 1992, at 5 p.m., after playing "The River" by Garth Brooks, the station flipped to its current format as "98.9 The Rock", which debuted with Kansas City band Shooting Star's "Hang On For Your Life". The current KQRC call letters were adopted on April 20, 1992.

The Rock has lived up to its name in the stability of its format, surviving a rock format shuffle in 1997 that claimed Kansas City's (then) longest-surviving (23 years) FM rock station, KYYS. Many stations tried (and failed) to achieve success over the years by copying the music and style of KYYS. KQRC took a different approach by targeting young adult males and playing bands that KYYS mainly ignored, like Metallica, Guns N' Roses, and Ozzy Osbourne. As grunge and alternative rock gained popularity through the 1990s, and without an alternative station that could be fully heard in Kansas City, KQRC regularly played artists like Nirvana, Green Day, and Soundgarden.

When the original version of KYYS abruptly changed formats in September 1997, KQRC and sister-station KCFX simulcasted a farewell show featuring the KYYS staff. Just one month later, KYYS would be resurrected by a different owner on a new frequency. However, this version would focus solely on classic rock, further distancing itself from KQRC. It was around this time that KQRC changed its slogan from "Kansas City's Pure Rock" to "Kansas City's Rock Station," which it still uses today.

Previous logo

Journal sold KQRC to Sinclair Broadcast Group in 1997, with Entercom buying the station in 2000. This made KQRC sister-stations with the second iteration of KYYS.

In 2002, the station's transmitter would be relocated to its current location near East 56th Street and Bennington Avenue in South Kansas City.

In May 2024, longtime afternoon DJ Jason Nivens was laid off. After sister station KRBZ announced it would end its alternative rock format in August 2024, KQRC would pick up their former afternoon program, The Church of Lazlo, in the same timeslot; as a means of transition, the two stations would simulcast the show until KRBZ's flip to a sports talk format as "The Fan" took place.

For 32 years, KQRC's morning show was primarily hosted by Johnny Dare. On March 6, 2025, the station announced that the show would come to an end the following day as a result of nationwide layoffs at Audacy.

On May 1, 2025, the station debuted a new lineup with the Church of Lazlo moving to the vacant morning slot and Ashley O taking over afternoons. The station also unveiled a new logo, replacing its long-time one.

== Rockfest ==
For many years, KQRC hosted Rockfest, the largest single-day music festival in North America. Past headliners include Disturbed, Godsmack, Staind, Seether, Stone Temple Pilots, and Korn.
