= KYYS =

Radio station in Kansas City, Kansas

- Kansas City, Kansas; United States
- Broadcast area: Kansas City metropolitan area
- Frequency: 1250 kHz
- Branding: La X 1250 AM

Programming
- Format: Regional Mexican

Ownership
- Owner: Audacy, Inc.; (Audacy License, LLC)
- Operator: Reyes Media Group
- Sister stations: KFNZ; KFNZ-FM; KMBZ; KMBZ-FM; KQRC-FM; KWOD; KZPT; WDAF-FM

History
- First air date: 1927
- Former call signs: WREN (1927–1999); KKGM (1999–2000); KXTR (2000–2001); KWSJ (2001–2002); KKHK (2002–2008)
- Call sign meaning: "Parked" from the current KZPT

Technical information
- Licensing authority: FCC
- Facility ID: 73938
- Class: B
- Power: 25,000 watts day; 3,700 watts night
- Transmitter coordinates: 39°11′06″N 94°27′28″W

Links
- Public license information: Public file; LMS
- Webcast: Listen live
- Website: x1250.com

KYYS (1250 AM) is a commercial radio station broadcasting a Regional Mexican format. It is licensed to Kansas City, Kansas. While it is owned by Audacy, Inc., the operations are under a local marketing agreement (LMA) with Reyes Media Group.

KYYS transmits with 25,000 watts daytime & 3,700 watts nighttime. In order to protect other stations from interference on 1250 kHz, it uses a directional antenna with a four-tower array at all times.

== History ==
=== In Lawrence and Topeka ===
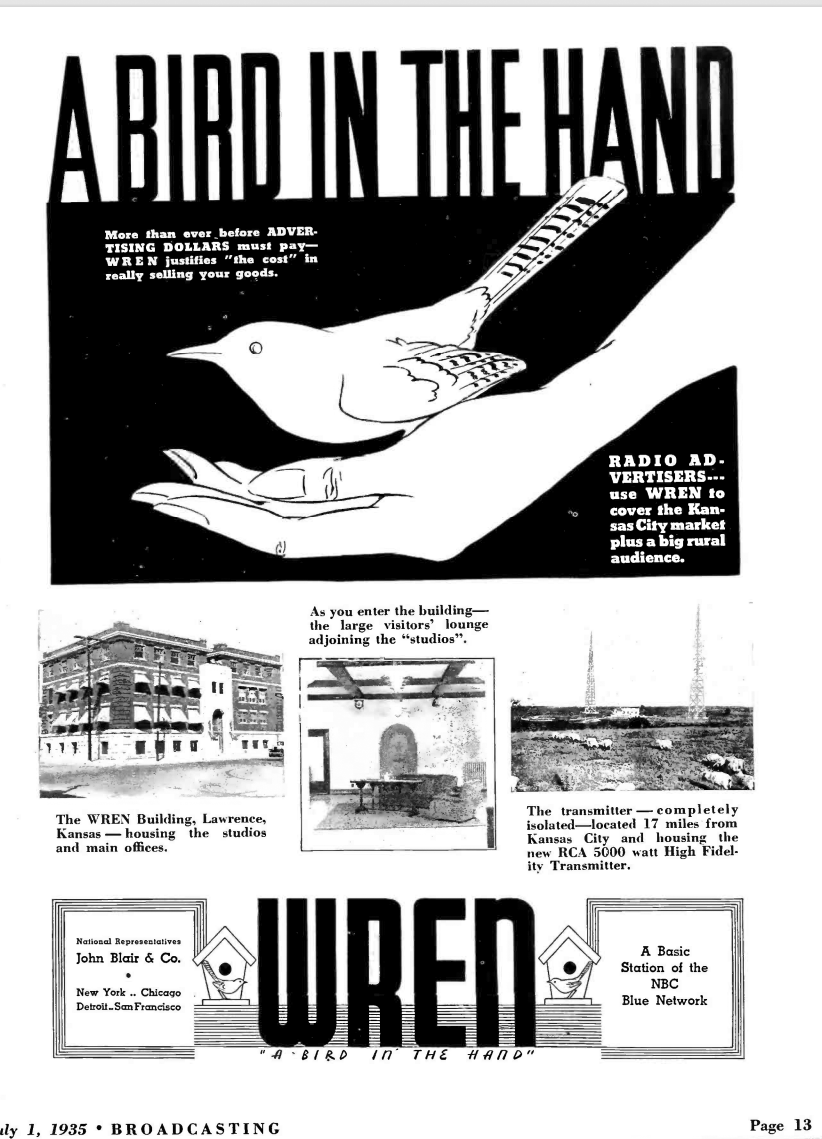
1935 station advertisement.

The station was first authorized, by telegram on April 27, 1927, as WREN, to the Jenny Wren flour company in Lawrence, Kansas. It operated at 1090 kHz for its first months and then used 1180 kHz, shared with KFKU, the radio station of the University of Kansas. On November 11, 1928, as part of the implementation of the Federal Radio Commission's General Order 40, WREN and KFRU were moved to 1220 kHz. In March 1941, under the provisions of the North American Regional Broadcasting Agreement, the stations on 1220 kHz, including WREN and KFRU, moved to 1250 kHz. KFKU, which shared time with WREN between 1927 and 1987, used its transmission facilities as well. WREN's transmitter was located in the storage room of the Bowersock Mills and Power Company, with the microphone sitting atop empty flour sacks.

In 1947, WREN moved to Topeka and placed its transmitter a mile east of Grantville, Kansas, on US Highway 24. The station also created the world's largest wren, today installed in the median of a Topeka street, that topped the station's studios. In 1952, former Governor Alf Landon and his family bought WREN, owning it until a 1982 sale to the Kassebaum Radio Group.

December 21, 1987, saw WREN go silent as the station fell on hard financial times, thanks to unpaid salaries, wire service bills, income and Social Security taxes, and other lawsuits. Additionally, KFKU, which had no transmitter of its own, fell silent for good. It would not be until December 9, 1991, after nearly four years without broadcasting, that WREN would return to the air with a satellite-fed gospel music format.

=== In Kansas City ===
In 1995, WREN applied with the Federal Communications Commission (FCC) to move into Kansas City, exchanging its 5,000-watt Topeka facility for 15,000 watts day and 3,700 watts night from a new transmitter in Kansas City, Missouri. This move was approved in January 1997, and was followed by a sale to the Mortenson Broadcasting Company of Canton, a Christian broadcaster, in 1997.

=== Expanded Band assignment ===
On March 17, 1997, the FCC announced that eighty-eight stations had been given permission to move to newly available "Expanded Band" transmitting frequencies, ranging from 1610 to 1700 kHz, with WREN authorized to move from 1250 to 1660 kHz.

On August 10, 1998, the new expanded band station on 1660 AM was assigned the call letters KBJC. The FCC's initial policy was that both the original station and its expanded band counterpart could operate simultaneously for up to five years, after which owners would have to turn in one of the two licenses, depending on whether they preferred the new assignment or elected to remain on the original frequency. However, this deadline has been extended multiple times, and both stations have remained authorized. One restriction is that the FCC has generally required paired original and expanded band stations to remain under common ownership.

=== Later history ===
Entercom acquired WREN in 1998, and the next year dropped the heritage WREN call sign used for 72 years in favor of KKGM, to complement a sports format, "1250 the Game". This began a run of four callsign changes in four consecutive years, as the station became KXTR in 2000 with classical music moved from 96.5 FM (having been affected by the move of its sports competitor to a better frequency), KWSJ in 2001, and KKHK in 2002. It was under the latter two callsigns that 1250 began broadcasting in Spanish for the first time, initially under the moniker "La Súper X".

KYYS was the longtime call-sign for a rock format station, first located at 102.1 MHz (now KCKC-FM) and, until January 2008, at 99.7 MHz (now KZPT). The calls were transferred to retain presence within the media market, yet has no ties to either of its predecessors.
