= KZPT =

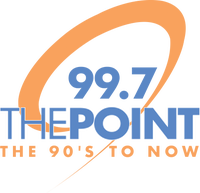
- Kansas City, Missouri; United States
- Broadcast area: Kansas City, MO-KS
- Frequency: 99.7 MHz (HD Radio)
- Branding: 99.7 The Point

Programming
- Language: English
- Format: Hot adult contemporary
- Subchannels: HD2: Channel Q

Ownership
- Owner: Audacy, Inc.; (Audacy License, LLC)
- Sister stations: KFNZ; KFNZ-FM; KMBZ; KMBZ-FM; KQRC-FM; KWOD; KYYS; WDAF-FM

History
- First air date: October 1962
- Former call signs: KMBC-FM (1962–67); KMBR (1967–91); KLTH (1991–98); KYYS (1998–2008); KBLV (2008–09); KKSN (2009–10); KGEX (2010–11)
- Call sign meaning: "Kansas Point"

Technical information
- Licensing authority: FCC
- Facility ID: 6379
- Class: C0
- ERP: 100,000 watts
- HAAT: 335 meters (1,099 ft)
- Transmitter coordinates: 39°1′20″N 94°30′49.8″W

Links
- Public license information: Public file; LMS
- Webcast: Listen live (via Audacy)
- Website: www.audacy.com/997thepoint

KZPT (99.7 FM) is a hot adult contemporary radio station licensed to and serving the Kansas City metropolitan area. The station is owned by Audacy, Inc. Its transmitter is located in east Kansas City, and studios are located in Mission, Kansas.

== History ==
=== Early years ===
The station's historic roots go back to an experimental station, W9XER, which began as an "Apex" high-frequency station owned by the Midland Broadcasting Company in Kansas City. In 1937, it was operating on 31.6 MHz, and by 1940 was transmitting on 42.46 MHz. In late 1941, W9XER was converted into one of the earliest FM stations, now transmitting on 46.5 MHz. In 1944 the station received a commercial license as KMBC-FM, and began daily broadcasts that June. In 1946, it moved to 97.9 FM. For two more years, KMBC-FM broadcast on 100.5 FM, until the station was deleted in December 1949.

Metromedia later revived the KMBC-FM call letters, when the station signed on at its permanent 99.7 FM location on October 15, 1962, with middle of the road music. KMBC-FM initially broadcast at 4,300 watts, but would upgrade to 98,000 watts in 1966. Bonneville bought the station in 1967 and requested new call letters to separate the station from its original AM and TV counterparts. That became reality on July 18, 1967, when the station changed call letters to KMBR, and began airing an easy listening format. KMBR was a steady presence in the market, lasting for around 25 years. In June 1990, KMBR would evolve to soft AC; by May 1991, the format shift was complete when KMBR rebranded as "Lite 99.7". The station also changed their call letters to KLTH on October 16, 1991. KLTH and KUDL competed strongly against one another for the dominant "at-work station" throughout the mid-1990s. However, KUDL's parent company Entercom bought KLTH in 1997, putting an end to the competition.

=== Revival of KY ===
KYYS logo from 1997 to 2006.

KYYS logo from 2006 to 2008.

On October 20, 1997, at 6 a.m., after playing "Same Old Lang Syne" by Dan Fogelberg, KLTH flipped to classic rock, branded as "The New 99-7 KY", picking up the former "KY" moniker, some of their former airstaff, and, on January 23, 1998, the KYYS call letters, all from the original KYYS on 102.1 FM. The first song on the revived "KY" was "Back in Black" by AC/DC.

In 2000, KYYS announced it would become the FM radio home of the Kansas City Chiefs. However, the Department of Justice blocked the move because Entercom would have too much revenue of the Kansas City radio market. The Chiefs would remain on rival station KCFX until 2020.

KYYS started airing the syndicated "Nights with Alice Cooper" in 2005. At the same time, the station shifted to a harder classic rock format with a new rival rock station (97.3 KCXM) challenging its sister station KQRC. Both KYYS and KCXM would use the slogan "Everything That Rocks" for a period. However, this format altering led to a decline in ratings, resulting in many listeners jumping ship to KCFX. KYYS would eventually shift back toward a traditional classic rock playlist using the slogan "Kansas City's Original Rock Station."

In 2007, KYYS made headlines for entering the Guinness World Records for having over 1,680 guitar players simultaneously play the same song, Smoke on the Water by Deep Purple.

=== 99-7 The Boulevard ===
With ratings on the decline, and failing to effectively compete against KCFX, KYYS was ended for a second time. On January 18, 2008, at 1 p.m., after playing "In the Dark" by Billy Squier (followed immediately afterward by a message announcing the end of the "KY" format, ending with a playing of the famous final chord of The Beatles' "A Day in the Life"), KYYS flipped to AAA, branded as "99-7 The Boulevard, Kansas City's Quality Rock". The first song on "The Boulevard" was "Boulevard" by Jackson Browne. On the same day as the flip, KYYS changed call letters to KBLV to match the "Boulevard" moniker. The station was mostly automated during this time. Mornings were hosted by Mo Lewis, afternoons were hosted by Jennifer Simon, and evenings were hosted by Operations Manager Greg Bergen. Ratings for the station sunk even further than they were in the final years of KYYS. Initially, the station featured a mix of classic rock artists (like Elton John, The Beatles, and Fleetwood Mac) with newer artists (like Sheryl Crow, Dave Matthews Band, and Jack Johnson). Over time, the playlist shifted to a more traditional classic rock format.

=== 99-7 Kiss FM ===
99-7 Kiss FM logo from 2009 to 2010.

Just 367 days after the debut of "The Boulevard", on January 13, 2009, at 3 p.m., after playing "Touch Me" by The Doors, KBLV began stunting with music from past "American Idol" contestants. One hour later, KBLV flipped to Hot AC, branded as "99-7 Kiss FM." The first song on "Kiss" was "Light On" by David Cook. On January 20, 2009, KBLV changed its call letters to KKSN. Almost all of the station's programming was syndicated: Kidd Kraddick in the Morning, On-Air with Ryan Seacrest in afternoons, and Kim Iversen at night. With the exception of Michelle Nichols in middays from March to June, middays were jockless. Kelly Urich, longtime personality at rival KMXV, joined the station in afternoons on November 9 of that year as the station's only local talent, moving Seacrest to middays. Ratings improved slightly when the station flipped to "Kiss", but still remained near the middle or bottom of Kansas City Arbitron ratings reports.

=== Gen X Radio 99-7 ===
KKSN logo during transition from "Kiss" to "Gen X."

On April 16, 2010, at 10 a.m., after playing "Just Dance" by Lady Gaga, KKSN flipped to 80s/90s Hits, rebranded as "Gen X Radio 99-7 Kiss FM". The first song on "Gen X" was "To Be With You" by Mr. Big. KKSN dropped Kraddick and Iversen from the lineup at this time, with Seacrest remaining as the lone syndicated holdover from the previous format. On May 27, the station dropped "Kiss FM" from their branding, and rebranded as "Gen X Radio 99-7". The next day, the station changed their call letters to KGEX. During its time as "Gen X", the station added a full-time local airstaff. Throughout its time as "Gen X", ratings for the station remained anemic.

=== 99-7 The Point ===
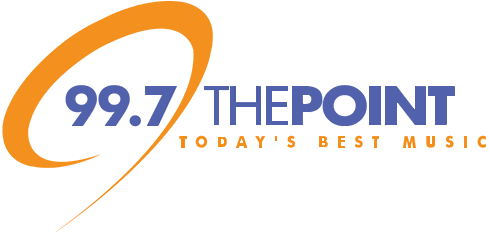
"99.7 The Point" logo under previous slogan

On March 23, 2011, at Noon, the station flipped back to hot adult contemporary, this time as "99-7 The Point". The last few songs on "Gen X Radio" were "Closer to Free" by BoDeans, "Closing Time" by Semisonic, "1, 2, 3, 4 (Sumpin' New)" by Coolio, "A Change Would Do You Good" by Sheryl Crow, "Bye Bye Bye" by NSYNC, and "Good Riddance (Time of Your Life)" by Green Day (the last song being preceded by a special signoff sweeper following a legal station identification to trigger the move). The first song on "The Point" was "Get the Party Started" by Pink. The new format was designed to combine the audience split between KGEX, KUDL and KCKC. On March 28, KUDL began simulcasting KGEX as part of a transition period to shift KUDL's audience over to the new format, as KUDL announced that they would be ending their adult contemporary format after 34 years and flip to a simulcast of KMBZ. On March 30, 2011, the simulcast between the two stations ended; on the same day, KGEX changed their call sign to the current KZPT.

KZPT's staff, in the beginning, included Urich (moved from afternoons) in morning drive, Tony Lorino in middays (Seacrest's show was dropped with the flip to "The Point"), Tanna Guthrie (formerly of KYYS and KUDL) in afternoons, and Matt Gapske at night. During its tenure as "The Point", the station's ratings have dramatically improved, with the station now typically ranked within the top 10 most listened-to stations in the market. Several years after the flip to "The Point", KZPT dropped most 1980s and 1990s hits and shifted back to an adult top 40 format. In 2022, the station shifted back to hot AC, using the slogan "The 90s to Now".

KZPT won "Station of the Year" from the Missouri Broadcasters Association (MBA) in June 2017. They also won first place in "Station Sponsored Community Event".

In 2018, the station launched the local "Ponch & Nikki" morning show. In 2023, the show began airing in afternoons on sister station KYKY in St. Louis. The next year, KZPT would begin airing The Bret Mega Show, KYKY's morning show, on delay in afternoons. In March 2025, the Ponch & Nikki show ended, as both hosts were let go in a round of corporate-wide layoffs. In June, Audacy announced that The Bret Mega Show would move to mornings.
