= KWOD =

Sports radio station in Kansas City

- Kansas City, Kansas; United States
- Broadcast area: Kansas City metropolitan area/Topeka, Kansas
- Frequency: 1660 kHz
- Branding: The Bet KC

Programming
- Language: English
- Format: Sports gambling
- Affiliations: BetMGM Network; Westwood One Sports

Ownership
- Owner: Audacy, Inc.; (Audacy License, LLC)
- Sister stations: KFNZ; KFNZ-FM; KMBZ; KMBZ-FM; KQRC-FM; KYYS; KZPT; WDAF-FM

History
- First air date: June 13, 2001 (as KXTR)
- Former call signs: KBJC (1998–2000); KWSJ (2000–2001); KXTR (2001–2007); WDAF (2007); KXTR (2007–2011); KUDL (2011–2014)
- Call sign meaning: "Parked" from the current KUDL in Sacramento

Technical information
- Licensing authority: FCC
- Facility ID: 87143
- Class: B
- Power: 10,000 watts day; 1,000 watts night
- Transmitter coordinates: 39°4′19″N 94°40′58.9″W

Links
- Public license information: Public file; LMS
- Webcast: Listen live (via Audacy)
- Website: www.audacy.com/thebetkc

KWOD (1660 AM) is a sports gambling radio station that broadcasts in the Kansas City Metropolitan Area. KWOD is owned by Audacy, Inc. Its transmitter is in Westwood, Kansas, and studios are located in Mission, Kansas.

== History ==
KWOD originated as the expanded band "twin" of an existing station on the standard AM band. On March 17, 1997, the Federal Communications Commission (FCC) announced that eighty-eight stations had been given permission to move to newly available "Expanded Band" transmitting frequencies, ranging from 1610 to 1700 kHz, with then-WREN in Kansas City, Kansas authorized to move from 1250 to 1660 kHz.

On August 10, 1998, the new expanded band station on 1660 AM was assigned the call letters KBJC. The FCC's initial policy was that both the original station and its expanded band counterpart could operate simultaneously for up to five years, after which owners would have to turn in one of the two licenses, depending on whether they preferred the new assignment or elected to remain on the original frequency. However, this deadline has been extended multiple times, and both stations have remained authorized. One restriction is that the FCC has generally required paired original and expanded band stations to remain under common ownership.

On August 17, 2000, the call sign on 1660 kHz was changed to KWSJ. That same day, Entercom (forerunner to Audacy) moved the KXTR call sign to 1250 AM, to establish a new pop station, KRBZ, which has since shifted to an alternative rock format. On June 6, 2001, the KXTR call sign was moved from 1250 AM to 1660 AM. The classical music format adopted at this time had started in September 1959 on the original KXTR, at 96.5 FM. As FM became the preferred band for popular music, revenue declined.

For a brief period in 2007, the station used the calls WDAF, which formerly belonged to AM sister KCSP. During the 2009 and 2010 summer months, KXTR played Motor Racing Network coverage of NASCAR Sprint cup night events, which may have been a simulcast from sister station KCSP, which already carried both Motor Racing Network and the Performance Racing Network. (Rival WHB had announced it would air MRN races in 2011.) KXTR is also the home of the Kansas City T-Bones, an independent minor league baseball team in Kansas City, Kansas.

The call letters were changed to KUDL on March 31, 2011; the call letters were transferred from what is now KMBZ-FM. KRBZ's HD2 channel offered a simulcast of KUDL's programming; as KXTR, this was offered on (the previous) KUDL. In addition, the station rebranded as "Radio Bach".

The classical format ended at 11 a.m. on March 1, 2012 (4 days earlier than originally announced), in favor of an all-business format, including programming from Bloomberg Radio and Wall Street Journal Radio Network. With the flip, the station adopted the branding "The KMBZ Business Channel," serving as a brand extension of KMBZ (980 AM and 98.1 FM); the two stations also began to share resources. KUDL's music library was then donated to Kansas Public Radio, based in nearby Lawrence. On April 7, 2014, as part of another warehousing move, Entercom swapped the KUDL call letters with sister station KWOD in Sacramento.

On September 8, 2015, KWOD flipped to sports talk, branded as "1660 The Score". KWOD aired Fox Sports Radio during the day and CBS Sports Radio at night, and served as a national complement to locally focused sister KCSP.

On June 21, 2021, KWOD changed their format to sports gambling, branded as "The Bet KC", with programming from the BetQL Network (now BetMGM Network). Programming from CBS Sports Radio (now Infinity Sports Network) was retained in certain timeslots.
