= WDAF-FM =

- Liberty, Missouri; United States
- Broadcast area: Kansas City metropolitan area
- Frequency: 106.5 MHz (HD Radio)
- Branding: 106.5 The Wolf

Programming
- Language: English
- Format: Country music

Ownership
- Owner: Audacy, Inc.; (Audacy License, LLC)
- Sister stations: KFNZ; KFNZ-FM; KMBZ; KMBZ-FM; KQRC-FM; KWOD; KYYS; KZPT

History
- First air date: May 8, 1978
- Former call signs: KFIX (1978–1979); KSAS (1979–1983); KKCI (1983–1986); KLTY (1986–1988); KXXR (1988–1992); KKCJ (1992–1995); KCIY (1995–2003)
- Call sign meaning: Carried over from the former WDAF (610 AM); now KFNZ

Technical information
- Licensing authority: FCC
- Facility ID: 8609
- Class: C1
- ERP: 100,000 watts
- HAAT: 299 meters (981 ft)
- Transmitter coordinates: 39.073°N 94.485°W

Links
- Public license information: Public file; LMS
- Webcast: Listen live (via Audacy)
- Website: www.audacy.com/1065thewolf

WDAF-FM (106.5 FM) is a commercial radio station licensed to Liberty, Missouri, United States, and serving the Kansas City metropolitan area. Owned by Audacy, Inc., the station airs a country music format branded as "106.5 The Wolf". Studios and offices are located on Squibb Road in Mission, Kansas.

WDAF-FM's transmitter is located on Wallace Avenue in east Kansas City, Missouri, near Interstate 435. WDAF-FM broadcasts in the HD Radio format.

== History ==
=== Early years ===
The station signed on the air on May 8, 1978, as KFIX-FM, the FM counterpart to KFIX (1140 AM, now KCXL), and was owned by Investments, Inc. KFIX-FM aired an adult Top 40 format, with news updates from the NBC Radio Network. Prior to the official sign-on, test transmissions carried the call sign KSAB (standing for "Strauss-Abernathy Broadcasting").

SW Radio Enterprises took over in 1979, flipping the format on November 19, changing call letters to KSAS, branded as "SAS 106 1/2". KSAS was a progressive rock station, in contrast to the more mainstream album rock format of top rock station KYYS (now KCKC). Golden East Broadcasting bought the station in March 1982.

In March 1983, the station decided to take KYYS head-on, flipping to album rock, and changing the call letters to KKCI. The station used the name "106 KCI", a reference to the Kansas City International Airport. Longtime Kansas City DJ Randy Miller made his first market appearance at KKCI. Transcolumbia bought the station in 1985.

On January 10, 1986, after failing to compete against KYYS, KKCI went off the air. Three weeks later, the station signed back on and flipped to a soft adult contemporary format, branded as "K-Lite", and changing the call letters to KLTY. KLTY tried to compete in a crowded AC field. In November 1987, Olympia Broadcasting bought the station.

=== KXXR ===
On July 29, 1988, at 2 p.m., after stunting for three days with a loop of "Kansas City" by The Beatles, KLTY flipped back to album rock, changing call letters to KXXR. Scout Broadcasting, subsidiary of Olympia, owned the station around the time of the flip. The first song under the new rock format (and also the song that ultimately ended the format nearly two years later) was "Roll With It" by Steve Winwood. The format, dubbed "Today's Rock and Roll", was a combination of rock-friendly CHR hits, hard rock and modern rock.

However, like the first time with the format, the second attempt as a rock station could not compete with KYYS. At 4 p.m. on June 15, 1990, KXXR flipped to a rhythmic contemporary format, branded as "X-106". The first song on "X" was "Me So Horny" by 2 Live Crew. Capitol Broadcasting bought the station on March 15, 1991, for $2.6 million. By June 1991, the station moved towards a more mainstream Top 40 direction and rebranded to using their call letters once again.

Due to low ratings, the station was about to change formats to country, but Capitol decided to change course: country-formatted KCFM (107.3 FM), owned by Meyer Communications, offered to swap frequencies. On February 16, 1992, at midnight, after playing "2 Legit 2 Quit" by MC Hammer, the frequency swap between the two stations took place, with KXXR moving to 107.3 FM, and KCFM’s country format moving to 106.5.

=== First country era ===
After the frequency swap, 106.5 FM stunted with all-Garth Brooks music for 16 days, then changed its call sign to KKCJ (instituted on March 9) and moniker to "CJ-106". ("CJ" stood for "Country Junction".) Capitol continued to own the station, while Sconnix, which owned country music rival KFKF, entered into a local marketing agreement (LMA) to run KKCJ as well. KKCJ was meant to be a younger-audience complement to KFKF, which targeted a more middle-aged audience. At first, KKCJ aired programming from the Satellite Music Network's "Country Coast to Coast" format, based in Dallas; on March 29, 1993, KKCJ began airing local programming. However, the station could not compete against WDAF and KBEQ (which flipped from Top 40 in February 1993). In addition, Sconnix’s LMA with KKCJ would end as EZ Communications purchased both KFKF and KBEQ, with a stipulation that KKCJ would change formats to avoid competition.

=== Smooth jazz ===
On March 10, 1995, at 6 p.m., after Heritage Media bought KKCJ, the station began stunting with simulcasts of KFKF and KBEQ, then a loop of liners redirecting listeners to both stations, before transitioning to all-polka and Hootie & The Blowfish music on March 20. The station also interspersed modern rock music during the stunting. On March 30, at 10 a.m., the station flipped to a smooth jazz format, branded as "106.5 The City". The first song on "The City" was "Smooth Operator" by Sade. On April 21, the station changed call letters to KCIY, to better fit the "City" moniker.

Sinclair Broadcast Group bought the station in 1997, with Entercom taking over in 2000. KCIY became the top soft music station in the market around this time. However, it came at the expense of co-owned KUDL, which aired a mainstream adult contemporary format.

=== Second country era ===
In the summer of 2003, Entercom announced it would start a sports talk format on 610 AM. This came after the signing of rival WHB sports hosts Jason Whitlock, Bill Maas, and Tim Grunhard. To make room for the new sports station, longtime country station “61 Country” would be moved to an FM frequency.

After a lengthy decision over which radio station to put the AM's country format (which involved sister station KRBZ almost being killed off for it, only to have an executive order issued by Entercom corporate management in response to overwhelming listener turnout halting that), it was announced that KCIY would flip back to country. At noon on August 10, 2003, after a 6-hour farewell show (and playing "Neither One of Us" by Gladys Knight & the Pips), WDAF began simulcasting on both 610 AM and 106.5 FM, for a one-month period until the sports talk format on 610 AM finally debuted on September 10. The new "Country 106.5 WDAF" initially featured the same longtime personalities of "61 Country" and a mostly gold-based country playlist. The WDAF call letters were officially moved over to 106.5 FM on August 22. (There had been a previous WDAF-FM in Kansas City from 1961 to 1974, at 102.1 MHz, now KCKC).

On January 10, 2007, WDAF-FM rebranded as "106.5 the Wolf". WDAF-FM continues in Kansas City's three-way country radio station battle, along with KFKF and KBEQ, both owned by Steel City Media. With the change to "The Wolf", the station shifted to a modern country format, which targeted younger listeners. Most of the longtime "61 Country" DJs were gone by that point.

Logo as the Kansas City Chiefs flagship station

On December 5, 2019, it was announced that WDAF-FM would become the flagship radio station of the Kansas City Chiefs with the start of the 2020 season, directly off their win in Super Bowl LIV, after the expiration of a 30-year deal with Cumulus Media's KCFX (101.1). Sister station KCSP carried wrap-around coaches and players programming and also simulcasts select games. The Audacy app carried coverage of the game on desktops/laptops only. On August 8, 2024, Audacy announced that, as part of the move of KCSP's programming to KRBZ as KFNZ-FM "96.5 the Fan", both KFNZ (AM) and KFNZ-FM are officially the new flagship stations of the Chiefs; WDAF-FM simulcast Chiefs games for the 2024 season.

In 2025, the station dismissed longtime hosts Zeke Montana, Codie Allen and Jeff ‘Shotgun’ Jaxon. A new morning show, “Jenny & Jagger” with Jenny Matthews and Mike ‘Jagger’ Thomas, was launched. The afternoon shift was taken over by Scotty Kay, voice-tracked from sister station WUSN in Chicago.

== See also ==
- WDAF (AM)
- Entercom
