= Westwood, Kansas =

- City
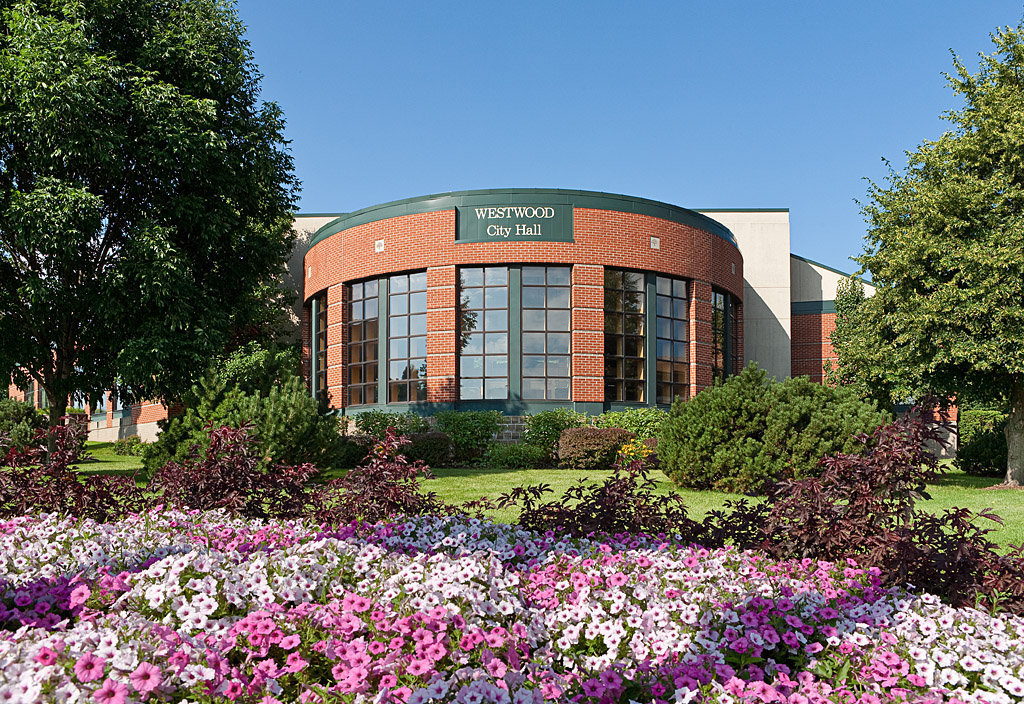
- Westwood City Hall (2011)

- Location within Johnson County and Kansas
- Interactive map of Westwood, Kansas
- Coordinates: 39°02′22″N 94°36′56″W
- Country: United States
- State: Kansas
- County: Johnson
- Incorporated: 1949

Government
  - Type: Mayor–Council
  - Mayor: David E. Waters

Area
  - Total: 0.41 sq mi (1.07 km^{2})
  - Land: 0.41 sq mi (1.07 km^{2})
  - Water: 0 sq mi (0.00 km^{2})
- Elevation: 955 ft (291 m)

Population (2020)
  - Total: 1,750
  - Density: 4,240/sq mi (1,640/km^{2})
- Time zone: UTC-6 (CST)
  - Summer (DST): UTC-5 (CDT)
- ZIP Code: 66205
- Area code: 913
- FIPS code: 20-77500
- GNIS ID: 485660
- Website: westwoodks.org

Westwood is a city in northeastern Johnson County, Kansas, United States. As of the 2020 census, the population of the city was 1,750. It is the second most densely populated city in the Kansas City Metropolitan Area.

== History ==
The land where Westwood is located was originally occupied by the Kansa and Pawnee Indians. However, beginning in the 1830s, Captain Joseph Parks, then Head Chief of the Shawnee, worked with the U.S. Government to remove the Shawnee tribes from Ohio to the newly opened reservations in northeastern Kansas. In exchange for his services, the government awarded Parks 1,290 acres of land straddling what is now Johnson and Wyandotte counties as part of an 1854 treaty with the Shawnee. In 1859, Parks died without leaving a will stating what should happen to the land. His heirs spent the next 60 years disputing how the land should be divided. The land that would eventually become Westwood was ultimately awarded to Parks' granddaughter and her husband, Catherine and John Swatzell. In 1898, the Swatzells built a stone home. That home is still located at 4958 Rainbow and is considered the beginnings of the community that would eventually become Westwood.

Following World War II, the land around the Swatzells' residence began to be seriously developed as a suburb of Kansas City. Residents originally formed the Hudson Mission Homes Association as a loose group who worked to bring streets and utilities to the area. Westwood was formally incorporated as a city in 1949. The name "Westwood" was chosen for the city because immediately to the East of Westwood there was Westwood, Missouri, which was already a thriving neighborhood. The name Westwood, moreover, already appeared in several area subdivisions and the elementary school which was already in existence was called Westwood View.

The Westwood Neighborhood Association was formed in 1987 for the purpose of hosting community events. Its first president was Tom Shanks, a sixteen-year-old resident. The association's first event was Oktoberfest, held in the park located at 50th and Rainbow. It is an event that still takes place in the community annually.

Westwood maintains its own police department, which serves the public.

== Geography ==
According to the United States Census Bureau, the city has a total area of 0.41 square miles (1.06 km^{2}), all land. The original boundaries of the city were 47th Street to the north, Rainbow Boulevard to the east, Shawnee Mission Parkway and the rear property line of the homes on 51st Terrace to the south, and Mission Road to the west. In 1960, the city also annexed Westport Annex and Westport View, extending the boundaries of the city to include 47th Place, 47th Terrace, and 48th Street from Rainbow Boulevard to State Line Road. In a 1973 vote, the city declined to consolidate with the neighboring city of Westwood Hills.

== Demographics ==
Historical population
Census	Pop.	Note	%±
1950	1,581		—
1960	2,040		29.0%
1970	2,383		16.8%
1980	1,783		−25.2%
1990	1,772		−0.6%
2000	1,533		−13.5%
2010	1,506		−1.8%
2020	1,750		16.2%
U.S. Decennial Census

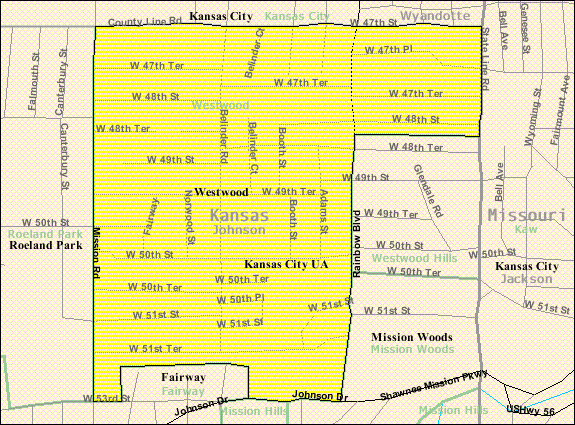
Detailed map of Westwood

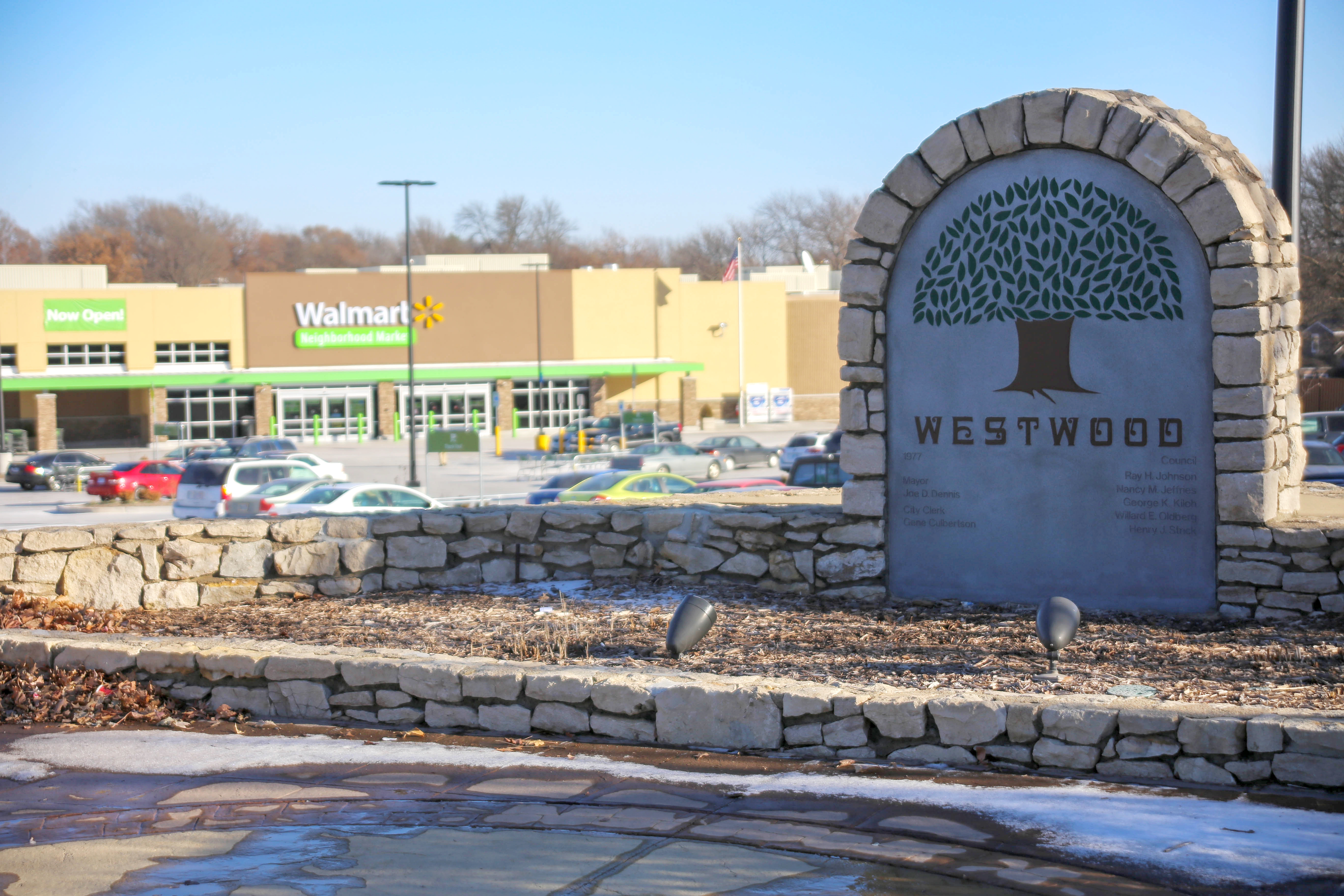
Entering Westwood along West 47th Street

=== Racial and ethnic composition ===
Westwood city, Kansas – Racial and ethnic composition Note: the US Census treats Hispanic/Latino as an ethnic category. This table excludes Latinos from the racial categories and assigns them to a separate category. Hispanics/Latinos may be of any race.
Race / Ethnicity (NH = Non-Hispanic)	Pop 2000	Pop 2010	Pop 2020	% 2000	% 2010	% 2020
White alone (NH)	1,409	1,320	1,469	91.91%	87.65%	83.94%
Black or African American alone (NH)	5	13	12	0.33%	0.86%	0.69%
Native American or Alaska Native alone (NH)	4	2	0	0.26%	0.13%	0.00%
Asian alone (NH)	26	27	53	1.70%	1.79%	3.03%
Native Hawaiian or Pacific Islander alone (NH)	0	2	0	0.00%	0.13%	0.00%
Other race alone (NH)	0	0	4	0.00%	0.00%	0.23%
Mixed race or Multiracial (NH)	11	26	63	0.72%	1.73%	3.60%
Hispanic or Latino (any race)	78	116	149	5.09%	7.70%	8.51%
Total	1,533	1,506	1,750	100.00%	100.00%	100.00%

=== 2020 census ===
As of the 2020 census, Westwood had a population of 1,750. The population density was 4,268.3 inhabitants per square mile (1,648.0/km^{2}). The median age was 37.4 years. 20.8% of residents were under the age of 18 and 13.9% were 65 years of age or older. For every 100 females there were 98.2 males, and for every 100 females age 18 and over there were 95.8 males age 18 and over.

There were 770 households, of which 30.3% had children under the age of 18 living in them. Of all households, 46.5% were married-couple households, 18.8% were households with a male householder and no spouse or partner present, and 26.5% were households with a female householder and no spouse or partner present. About 30.7% of all households were made up of individuals and 10.4% had someone living alone who was 65 years of age or older. There were 825 housing units, of which 6.7% were vacant. The homeowner vacancy rate was 1.5% and the rental vacancy rate was 9.6%.

100.0% of residents lived in urban areas, while 0.0% lived in rural areas.

Racial composition as of the 2020 census
Race	Number	Percent
White	1,509	86.2%
Black or African American	12	0.7%
American Indian and Alaska Native	5	0.3%
Asian	53	3.0%
Native Hawaiian and Other Pacific Islander	0	0.0%
Some other race	30	1.7%
Two or more races	141	8.1%

=== Income and poverty ===
The median income for a household in the city was $79,955 and the median income for a family was $106,250. About 4.8% of the population were below the poverty line, including 3.2% of those under age 18 and 4.7% of those age 65 and older.

=== 2010 census ===
As of the census of 2010, there were 1,506 people, 693 households, and 386 families living in the city. The population density was 3,673.2 inhabitants per square mile (1,418.2/km^{2}). There were 732 housing units at an average density of 1,785.4 per square mile (689.3/km^{2}). The racial makeup of the city was 94.6% White, 0.9% African American, 0.3% Native American, 1.8% Asian, 0.1% Pacific Islander, 0.5% from other races, and 1.9% from two or more races. Hispanic or Latino of any race were 7.7% of the population.

There were 693 households, of which 28.3% had children under the age of 18 living with them, 45.0% were married couples living together, 7.6% had a female householder with no husband present, 3.0% had a male householder with no wife present, and 44.3% were non-families. 34.8% of all households were made up of individuals, and 11.2% had someone living alone who was 65 years of age or older. The average household size was 2.17 and the average family size was 2.88.

The median age in the city was 38.8 years. 21.2% of residents were under the age of 18; 4.6% were between the ages of 18 and 24; 34.1% were from 25 to 44; 25.1% were from 45 to 64; and 14.8% were 65 years of age or older. The gender makeup of the city was 48.0% male and 52.0% female.

=== 2000 census ===
As of the census of 2000, there were 1,533 people, 711 households, and 418 families living in the city. The population density was 3,791.5 inhabitants per square mile (1,463.9/km^{2}). There were 731 housing units at an average density of 1,808.0 per square mile (698.1/km^{2}). The racial makeup of the city was 95.83% White, 0.33% African American, 0.26% Native American, 1.70% Asian, 0.91% from other races, and 0.98% from two or more races. Hispanic or Latino of any race were 5.09% of the population.

There were 711 households, out of which 24.6% had children under the age of 18 living with them, 48.8% were married couples living together, 7.2% had a female householder with no husband present, and 41.1% were non-families. 35.3% of all households were made up of individuals, and 12.2% had someone living alone who was 65 years of age or older. The average household size was 2.16 and the average family size was 2.82.

In the city, the population was spread out, with 20.5% under the age of 18, 4.2% from 18 to 24, 35.1% from 25 to 44, 22.8% from 45 to 64, and 17.3% who were 65 years of age or older. The median age was 39 years. For every 100 females, there were 88.8 males. For every 100 females age 18 and over, there were 83.7 males.

The median income for a household in the city was $49,185, and the median income for a family was $66,765. Males had a median income of $49,167 versus $35,898 for females. The per capita income for the city was $31,048. About 2.6% of families and 4.2% of the population were below the poverty line, including 6.2% of those under age 18 and 3.5% of those age 65 or over.
