= KMBZ-FM =

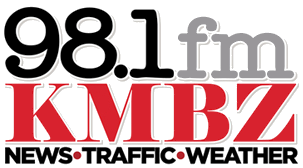
- Kansas City, Kansas; United States
- Broadcast area: Kansas City metropolitan area
- Frequency: 98.1 MHz (HD Radio)
- Branding: 98.1 KMBZ

Programming
- Format: News/talk
- Subchannels: HD2: Talk radio (KMBZ)
- Network: ABC News Radio
- Affiliations: Compass Media Networks; Premiere Networks; KMBC-TV

Ownership
- Owner: Audacy, Inc.; (Audacy License, LLC)
- Sister stations: KFNZ; KFNZ-FM; KMBZ; KQRC-FM; KWOD; KYYS; KZPT; WDAF-FM

History
- First air date: December 9, 1959
- Former call signs: KCJC (1959–1971); KUDL (1971–2011)
- Call sign meaning: Taken from sister station KMBZ

Technical information
- Licensing authority: FCC
- Facility ID: 2449
- Class: C0
- ERP: 100,000 watts
- HAAT: 335 meters (1,099 ft)
- Transmitter coordinates: 39.022°N 94.514°W

Links
- Public license information: Public file; LMS
- Webcast: Listen live (via Audacy)
- Website: www.audacy.com/kmbz

KMBZ-FM (98.1 MHz) is a commercial radio station licensed to Kansas City, Kansas. Owned by Audacy, Inc., KMBZ-FM airs a news/talk radio format. Its studios and offices are on Squibb Road in Mission, Kansas.

KMBZ-FM broadcasts at 100,000 watts, the maximum for most FM stations in the U.S. The transmitter is located on East 56th Street near Bennington Avenue in Kansas City, Missouri.

== Programming ==
KMBZ-FM's schedule is mostly local talk shows, while its sister station, KMBZ (980 AM), carries mostly nationally syndicated hosts. Weekdays on KMBZ-FM begin with Kansas City's Morning News, followed by talk shows hosted by Jonathan Weir and Jayme Monacelli, and Dana Wright and Scott Parks. Nights feature syndicated shows including Armstrong & Getty, Our American Stories with Lee Habeeb, Coast to Coast AM with George Noory and This Morning, America's First News with Gordon Deal.

On weekends, shows on money, health, gardening, law and technology are heard, some of which are paid brokered programming. Syndicated programs on weekends include The Kim Komando Show, Bill Handel on the Law and Walter Sterling on Sundays. Most hours begin with an update from ABC News Radio.

== History ==
=== 1959-1969: KCJC ===
The station first signed on the air on December 9, 1959, as KCJC. It was owned by Futura Music, Inc. and had studios on Rock Creek Lane in Mission, Kansas. The format varied from middle of the road to progressive rock over time.

In 1967, Starr Broadcasting acquired both KCJC and KUDL (1380 AM, now KCNW) in nearby Fairway, Kansas.

=== 1969-2011: KUDL ===
KCJC began to simulcast the Top 40 format on KUDL and switched its call sign to KUDL-FM in 1971. The Top 40 hits gave way briefly to a progressive rock format. Then in 1972, the station became Kansas City's second FM station targeting the African-American community, after KPRS-FM, and aired an R&B/soul music format.

In 1973, KUDL switched back to a progressive rock format until 1975, when it reverted to Top 40. The following year, it began calling itself "Disco 98" with a disco music format.

In 1977, KUDL switched to their long running soft rock format. The format lasted through the 1980s and early 1990s, although modified to a soft adult contemporary format, which would later transition to a more upbeat direction by 2000.

In 1978, KUDL and AM 1380, which aired an all-news format, would separate, as the latter was sold to new owners.

In 1993, Apollo Broadcasting bought KUDL and WHB from Shamrock Broadcasting. Apollo then sold WHB to local broadcaster Kanza, Inc., on the same day. In June 1995, Regent Communications bought the station, then Jacor in October 1996, and finally to Entercom in October 1997. These changes resulted in KUDL's top competitor, KLTH "Lite 99.7" becoming its sister station. In October 1997, KLTH changed formats and directed its listeners to KUDL.

In 2003, Entercom dropped the smooth jazz format of KCIY, moving that station to country music. However, KUDL continued airing smooth jazz on Sunday mornings, 7 to 11 am, hosted by Taylor Scott. In 2010, KUDL changed its positioning slogan from "98-1 KUDL" to "Soft Rock 98-1".

For many years, KUDL and rival station "Star 102" aired all-Christmas music during the holiday season. The stations became very competitive as to which station would begin playing Christmas music first each year.

=== 2011–present: KMBZ-FM ===
On March 23, 2011, sister station KGEX flipped to a more modern-leaning adult contemporary format as "99-7 The Point" that contained some overlap with KUDL. One hour after "The Point" launched, KUDL announced that they would drop their adult contemporary format after 34 years and flip to a simulcast of sister station KMBZ. The move came likely due to KUDL's mediocre ratings, holding a relatively low 3.4 share in the February 2011 Kansas City Arbitron ratings report, as well as a likely negative connection to the call letters KUDL, which likely turned away younger demographics. Coincidentally, KUDL's primary rival, "Star 102", changed formats just two months prior. After the announcement was made, KUDL then began running liners redirecting listeners to KGEX, who would change call letters to KZPT. KUDL morning host Tanna Guthrie moved to afternoons on KZPT, and afternoon host Roger Carson moved to mornings on sister station WDAF-FM, where he replaced Blake Powers. The station held a two-hour farewell show on March 28, before KUDL closed out its heritage format at 8 a.m. that day with "Hold On to the Nights" by Richard Marx. Following the show, KUDL began simulcasting KZPT for three days, as another way to redirect listeners to the frequency.

On March 30, at 2 p.m., after playing "Something to Talk About" by Bonnie Raitt, KUDL broke from the simulcast and became KMBZ-FM. In addition, KMBZ-FM replaced its classical music format on its HD2 subchannel. Currently, KMBZ-FM-HD2 carries a simulcast of KMBZ (AM).

The simulcast of KMBZ and KMBZ-FM was split on January 5, 2015, with the AM adopting a mostly syndicated talk format as "Talk 980", while the FM revamped its schedule by airing a more locally oriented talk line up. KMBZ and KMBZ-FM continue to simulcast the morning news block, "Kansas City's Morning News", on both stations.
