= KFNZ-FM =

Sports radio station in Mission–Kansas City, Kansas

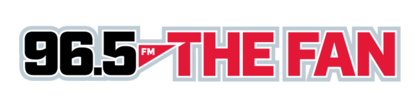
- Kansas City, Missouri; United States
- Broadcast area: Kansas City metropolitan area
- Frequency: 96.5 MHz (HD Radio)
- Branding: 96.5 The Fan

Programming
- Language: English
- Format: Sports talk
- Subchannels: HD2: KFNZ simulcast
- Affiliations: Fox Sports Radio; Kansas City Royals Radio Network; Kansas City Chiefs Radio Network

Ownership
- Owner: Audacy, Inc.; (Audacy License, LLC)
- Sister stations: KFNZ; KMBZ; KMBZ-FM; KQRC-FM; KWOD; KYYS; KZPT; WDAF-FM

History
- First air date: September 3, 1959; 67 years ago
- Former call signs: KXTR (1959–2000); KRBZ (2000-2024)
- Call sign meaning: "Fans"

Technical information
- Licensing authority: FCC
- Facility ID: 57119
- Class: C0
- ERP: 100,000 watts
- HAAT: 335 meters (1,099 ft)
- Transmitter coordinates: 39.022°N 94.514°W
- Repeater: 610 KFNZ (Kansas City)

Links
- Public license information: Public file; LMS
- Webcast: Listen live (via Audacy)
- Website: www.audacy.com/965thefan

KFNZ-FM (96.5 MHz) is a commercial radio station in Kansas City, Missouri. It simulcasts a sports radio format with sister station KFNZ (610 AM), except during conflicting sports programming. The stations are owned by Audacy, Inc., with studios on Squibb Road in Mission, Kansas. KFNZ-AM-FM air local sports shows on weekdays, with Fox Sports Radio programming heard nights and weekends. They are the flagship radio stations for the Kansas City Chiefs and the Kansas City Royals.

KFNZ-FM is a Class C0 station, and has an effective radiated power (ERP) of 100,000 watts. The station's transmitter is off East 56th Street near Bennington Avenue in Kansas City. KFNZ-FM broadcasts using HD Radio technology.

== History ==
=== Classical KXTR ===
The station began broadcasting on September 3, 1959. For four decades, it was classical music station KXTR, first owned by Telesound Broadcasting, and initially operating at 58,500 watts. Stereo Broadcasters, Inc. bought the station in 1962, and Senthesound Broadcasting bought it three years later. Robert Ingram took over the station in 1976, and KXTR upgraded to 100,000 watts in 1981.

Ingram sold the station to Heritage Media (and then Sinclair Broadcast Group) in 1997. Sinclair then sold it to Entercom (the forerunner to the present-day Audacy) in 2000. By the mid-1990s, KXTR replaced much of its live, local air staff with satellite-fed national programming. Only mornings were local, as well as "Night on the Town" on Saturdays (which would become syndicated).

In the spring of 2000, KXTR's ratings were tied for 12th place, with a 3.8 share of the market. (It was ranked even lower in the 25-54 demographic, though ranked 9th in the 35-64 demographic.)

=== 96.5 The Buzz ===
On August 17, 2000, at 10 a.m., KXTR was moved to 1250 AM, displacing sports talk station KKGM (now Regional Mexican station KYYS). At that point, 96.5 began stunting with a ticking clock. At noon, 96.5 flipped to a Top 40 format that emphasized modern rock hits (sometimes called "Rock 40"), taking aim at rival contemporary station KMXV, and was branded as "96.5 The Buzz". The first song played on "The Buzz" was "Learn To Fly" by Foo Fighters. The call sign changed to KRBZ on August 25, 2000.

By 2002, KRBZ moved towards a hot adult contemporary format. However, the move failed, as the station fell to a 3.1 share of the market (15th place) by the spring of 2002.

On April 1, 2002, the station stunted as "K-Gay 96.5", playing mostly dance music. (Note: In 2019, KRBZ's HD Radio subchannel would take on Entercom's Channel Q network, which more appropriately targets an LGBTQ audience.) The next day, it refocused as a modern AC station, as well as introducing a new morning show, "The Kenny & Afentra Showgram". Scott Geiger, known on the radio as Lazlo, was also hired in September 2002 to work nights, and would soon be promoted to afternoons. "The Kenny & Afentra Showgram" morning show lasted until July 2003, when Kenny Holland was let go, and the show was re-branded as "Afentra's Big Fat Morning Buzz."

==== Alternative rock ====
By September 2003, the station completely shifted to a full-fledged alternative rock format, returning the format to the market for the first time since 1999, when KLZR shifted to Top 40/CHR and when KNRX dropped its alternative format for urban oldies.

Also in 2003, KRBZ was nearly pulled off the air when plans for sports station KCSP forced longtime country music station WDAF to look for an FM home. Fans gathered to "Save The Buzz", showing a huge turnout and solidifying the station's alternative format. Instead, WDAF moved to 106.5 FM, displacing KCIY, a smooth jazz station.

==== Staff changes ====
On June 1, 2006, afternoon host/program director Lazlo announced he was leaving the station to become program director of sister station KNDD in Seattle. His then-wife, Afentra, host of morning show "Afentra's Big Fat Morning Buzz," worked her last day from the studios in Kansas City on August 4, but continued to host mornings at KRBZ via satellite from her home in Seattle until November. Her co-hosts remained in Kansas City. Operations Manager Greg Bergen took over as program director in the wake of Lazlo's exit. On September 8, morning co-host Danny Boi announced plans to leave the show and the station. He was replaced as co-host by Slimfast.

On November 10, 2006, it was announced that Lazlo, Afentra, and Slimfast would reunite on-air for "The Church of Lazlo", which broadcast from Seattle on KNDD and simulcast on KRBZ. On February 12, 2007, "The Dick Dale Show with Jessica Chase" debuted as the station's new morning show. Less than a month later, Chase quietly departed the station, ultimately being replaced by Kevin Quinn. On July 9, 2008, the morning show was disbanded with Dick Dale being let go from the station.

On July 17, 2008, Lazlo, Afentra, and Slimfast announced plans to end The Church of Lazlo's run on KNDD. This came shortly after the announcement that former KRBZ Program Director Mike Kaplan would take over programming duties at KNDD.

On August 25, 2008, both "Afentra's Big Fat Morning Buzz" and "The Church of Lazlo" returned live to Kansas City.

==== Morning show controversy ====
In 2014, the station was forced to pay $1 million in a defamation lawsuit that spawned from comments made on the morning show.

Afentra abruptly left the station on August 1, 2018, due to her contract not being renewed. Her co-hosts, Danny Boi and Mark Van Sickle, continued the morning show as "Danny and Mark in the Morning". In 2022, Afentra would file an Equal Pay and Discrimination lawsuit against KRBZ for her termination.

On September 24, 2018, Jordin Silver joined Danny Boi and Mark on the morning show, and it was renamed "Mornings with Jordin Silver and Friends". Silver previously worked at KYSR in Los Angeles and KNDD. Danny Boi and Mark eventually left the station.

=== Alt 96.5 ===
On September 14, 2020, KRBZ rebranded as "Alt 96.5." The move came after Entercom initiated airstaff cuts at their country and alternative formatted stations nationwide, which included morning host Jordin Silver (who would return to the station in April 2022 to host middays remotely from Los Angeles) and night host/"The Church of Lazlo" producer Hartzell Gray (who has since returned to Audacy) being let go. KRBZ began airing Stryker & Klein (later renamed Klein & Ally) and Megan Holiday from sister KROQ in Los Angeles for mornings and middays, and Kevan Kenney and Bryce Segall from WNYL in New York City for nights and overnights, respectively. In addition, "The Church of Lazlo" remained in afternoons, though it would be syndicated to sister stations in Dallas, Detroit, and Las Vegas; also, former midday host Jeriney became a co-host (she has since left the station, and has been replaced by former "Church of Lazlo" co-host Snowcone). In addition, longtime specialty programs such as "Homegrown Buzz", "Resurrection Sunday", "Lazlo's Hardrive", and "Sonic Spectrum" were dropped.

On November 15, 2021, KRBZ dropped Klein & Ally, as the show ended syndication to focus on their local audience in Los Angeles. Mornings would run jockless until January 3, 2022, when KRBZ became an affiliate for Elliot in the Morning, based at Washington, D.C.'s WWDC. In August 2022, "The Church of Lazlo" stopped airing in syndication, but continued to air in afternoons on KRBZ. At the end of 2022, KRBZ dropped Elliot in the Morning; mornings would remain jockless for the remainder of the alternative format's run.

=== 96.5 The Fan ===
On August 8, 2024, at 10 a.m., Audacy announced that KRBZ would flip to a simulcast of co-owned sports talk AM station KCSP, and rebrand as “96.5 The Fan”, beginning August 15. Concurrent with the flip, KRBZ would take on new call sign KFNZ-FM. (In addition, KCSP would also adopt the KFNZ call letters to match.) With the move, KFNZ-FM became the exclusive FM home of the Kansas City Royals and would add the Kansas City Chiefs, which had been on WDAF-FM. WDAF-FM would continue to air Chiefs games during the 2024 season, and some Royals games would remain solely on KFNZ (AM). The Church of Lazlo would immediately move to co-owned KQRC, with the show airing on both stations in the interim week as a transitionary move.

At 6 p.m. on August 14, following the end of that day's Lazlo broadcast (and after playing "Last Goodbye" by Jeff Buckley; the last song under the alternative format prior to the Lazlo simulcast was Weezer's "Say It Ain't So"),"KRBZ 96.5 Kansas City, MO End Of Alt 96.5 14 August 2024". both KRBZ and KCSP began stunting, running announcements teasing the new format and running podcast-style monologues on notable teams in Kansas City sports history, beginning and ending with the 2023 Chiefs winning Super Bowl LVIII. "The Fan" officially launched at 6 a.m. on August 15 on both 96.5 FM and 610 AM; in addition, the KFNZ-FM call sign went into effect.

== See also ==
- List of Kansas City Chiefs broadcasters
