= KCKC =

Adult hits radio station in Kansas City

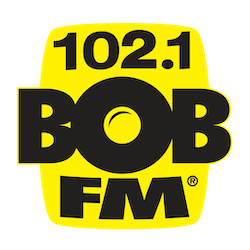
- Kansas City, Missouri; United States
- Broadcast area: Kansas City metropolitan area
- Frequency: 102.1 MHz
- Branding: 102.1 Bob FM

Programming
- Format: Adult hits

Ownership
- Owner: Steel City Media; (MGTF Media Company, LLC)
- Sister stations: KBEQ-FM, KFKF-FM, KMXV

History
- First air date: March 5, 1961
- Former call signs: WDAF-FM (1961–1974); KYYS (1974–1998); KOZN (1998–1999); KSRC (1999–2006)
- Call sign meaning: Kansas City repeated

Technical information
- Licensing authority: FCC
- Facility ID: 11279
- Class: C0
- ERP: 100,000 watts
- HAAT: 341 meters (1,119 ft)
- Transmitter coordinates: 39.091°N 94.472°W

Links
- Public license information: Public file; LMS
- Webcast: Listen live
- Website: www.1021bobfm.com

KCKC (102.1 FM) is an adult hits radio station based in Kansas City, Missouri, that operates with an ERP of 100 kW. It is licensed to and operated by Steel City Media. The studios are at Westport Center in Midtown Kansas City and the transmitter is in Independence, Missouri.

== History ==
=== Early years ===
The first station on the frequency, WHB-FM, signed on in 1948, as a simulcast for WHB (then at 710 AM). Cook Paint and Varnish Company owned the station. This would only last for about two years, as FM radio was still in its infancy. The company turned in the license in 1950.

Transcontinent Television signed on WDAF-FM on March 5, 1961, as a simulcast partner to WDAF (610 AM). WDAF-FM was an NBC Radio affiliate, with 36,000 watts of power. Taft Broadcasting purchased the WDAF stations in 1964.

In 1967, WDAF-FM departed from the AM simulcast in afternoons and evenings with a top 40 format. The FM then moved to middle of the road on January 15, 1968, referring to themselves as "Popular 102". The station upgraded to 100,000 watts on New Year's Day, 1971. Also that year, WDAF-FM flipped to oldies, the first time an FM station in Kansas City had attempted at the format. It began with Drake-Chenault's syndicated The History of Rock and Roll. Drake did not actually call it oldies; they referred to the automated programming as "Vintage Top 40". WDAF-FM returned to Top 40 just four months later in May 1971. By 1974, WDAF-FM was leaning middle of the road again, and completely automated.

=== KY 102 ===
On July 1, 1974, one of Kansas City's legendary radio stations signed on, when WDAF-FM flipped to album-oriented rock, branded as "KY 102", and changed call sign to KYYS (the "KY" in the slogan refers to the first and last sign in "Kansas City"). The first (and ultimately, last) song on "KY 102" was "Too Many People" by Paul McCartney. KYYS became the most successful AOR station in Kansas City, hitting #1 in the ratings in 1979 when acts like Bad Company, Styx, REO Speedwagon, Bob Seger, Kiss and Journey were popular, along with legendary personality Max Floyd's anti-disco speeches under the name "The Rock and Roll Army." KYYS expanded and contracted the playlist over the years as the music dictated, sometimes leaning heavily on gold material, and sometimes being more adventurous with new music. For many years, the station went without meaningful competition. Many of the personalities spent a long time at the station, including Max Floyd, who was on the air the day the format started in 1974, and the day it ended in 1997. Great American Broadcasting (later Citicasters) bought the station in 1987.

KYYS, for a time, competed with KSAS, KKCI or KXXR (all located on 106.5 FM, now the current incarnation of WDAF-FM). In April 1992, KRVK flipped from adult contemporary to active rock as KQRC. This began the end of KY's long dominance in the ratings, as KQRC took away many listeners with new hard and modern rock that KYYS generally ignored. When KY finally started playing acts such as Pearl Jam and Red Hot Chili Peppers, it was too late, and their ratings never recovered. The station also tended to avoid playing Metallica and similar heavy metal bands. By 1997, KYYS leaned very heavily on new music, playing as much of it as they could from artists like Dave Matthews Band, The Wallflowers, Sheryl Crow, and Collective Soul.

=== The Zone ===
In September 1996, after the passage of the sweeping Telecommunications Act of 1996, Citicasters merged with Jacor Communications. In June 1997, KYYS was sold off to American Radio Systems, and then to Westinghouse/CBS in September (their AM sister station, WDAF, would be sold to Entercom in October). On September 19, 1997, at 12:01 a.m., KYYS flipped to modern adult contemporary, branded as "102.1 The Zone". The first song on "The Zone" was "A Change Would Do You Good" by Sheryl Crow. KYYS' staff barely had a chance to set up the final hour of music and to say goodbye to listeners; in addition, the airstaff was let go barely an hour before the change. (In fact, the official goodbye came a week after the format change, when KYYS staff members held a midday interview simulcast on KQRC and KCFX, which were then owned by the same company). On January 16, 1998, the station's call sign changed to KOZN. The station's ratings plummeted even further, as the station's playlist sounded quite similar to sister station KMXV, which airs a Top 40/CHR format that, at the time, leaned heavily on modern rock. In addition, KYYS was revived on former adult contemporary station KLTH about a month after 102.1's flip, this time as a classic rock station featuring many of KY's earlier personalities. (Since June 2020, KYSJ in St. Joseph has broadcast a classic rock format using the "KY 102" branding).

In June 1998, CBS split off the radio division under the revived Infinity Broadcasting name, which would be renamed CBS Radio in December 2005.

=== Star 102 ===
On January 4, 1999, at 5 p.m., after playing "Ants Marching" by Dave Matthews Band, KOZN began stunting with ocean sounds, as well as liners redirecting listeners to KMXV, and to listen at 9 a.m. the following day for something new on 102.1. At the promised time, KOZN flipped to adult contemporary, branded as "Star 102”, under new Program Director Jon Zellner (who continued to program KMXV). The first song on "Star" was "Nothing's Gonna Stop Us Now" by Starship. On February 1, KOZN changed their call sign to KSRC. "Star" primarily competed with Entercom's KUDL and KCIY. The station also aired Christmas music during the holiday season to compete with KUDL, a tradition that began in November 1999. (A few times, the two stations would flip to Christmas music within hours of each other, and on occasion, KSRC/KCKC would be the first station to go all-Christmas in the United States). It would only take a year for KSRC to beat KUDL in the ratings. Zellner left the station in 2004. In 2005, KSRC changed to a more upbeat image, dropping most soft-sounding music, with John Tesh's syndicated "Intelligence For Your Life" added to the evening schedule in the later part of the year.

On January 24, 2006, the station changed its call sign to KCKC as CBS anticipated success with its post-Howard Stern formatted hot talk stations under the "Free FM" branding and intended to convert KCKC to the same format. The plan was quickly nixed as Free FM became one of the most notorious format flops of the 2000s, and the station retained its format, though Tesh's show was temporarily set aside as CBS Radio figured out what to do with the station. In November 2006, CBS sold the station to Wilks Broadcasting to focus on larger markets. John Tesh's show soon returned to nights, and eventually, replays from the previous night aired in afternoons.

While popular for many years, both KUDL and KCKC began to decline in the Arbitron ratings after the introduction of the Portable People Meter in early 2009. KUDL, though, usually had the upper hand compared to KCKC, most likely due to that station's heritage in the market, as they had been in the format since 1977. In addition, most adult contemporary stations across the country were declining in ratings during this time period, due to challenges while attempting to attract a younger audience.

=== Alice 102 ===
During the station's annual Christmas music run on December 22, 2010, KCKC began promoting "a new sound coming" on January 3, 2011. In addition, the station's website displayed a countdown clock to the announcement, which would take place that day at Noon. At that time, after playing "Same Old Lang Syne" by Dan Fogelberg, KCKC flipped to AAA, branded as "Alice 102". The first song on "Alice" was "The One I Love" by R.E.M. Initially, the format had a precise gold lean to it, mostly concentrating on rock music from the 1980s, and a wide library, with less of a focus on personalities. As the year progressed, with several music festivals hosted in the city throughout the year (especially the popular "Kanrocksas" festival at Kansas Speedway), the station added more current music. "Alice" competed with Entercom's modern rock KRBZ, Cumulus Media's classic rocker KCFX, and non-commercial AAA-formatted KTBG. During the station’s tenure as “Alice", KCKC's ratings would hang around the 2.5 share range (#15-16) of the market.

=== KC 102.1 ===
On January 27, 2014, Wilks registered the domain "KC1021.com", possibly signaling another format change or altering for the second time in three years. Three days later, Wilks registered "Alt102.com." On February 4, at 6 p.m., after playing Semisonic's "Closing Time", KCKC began stunting with a countdown to 3 p.m. the following afternoon, when the station flipped back to adult contemporary, branded as "KC 102.1". The first song on "KC" was "Get The Party Started" by P!nk. When the station relaunched its AC format, it featured the "More Music, More Variety, More Fun" slogan, as well as an emphasis on songs from the 1980s, including "Totally ‘80s Weekends" airing every weekend. The station also began to air all-Christmas music again, replacing sister station KFKF, who continued the tradition after the demise of "Star 102" three years prior.

On June 12, 2014, Wilks announced that it would sell its Kansas City cluster (including KCKC) to Pittsburgh-based Steel City Media. The sale was approved on September 26, 2014, and was consummated on September 30. Shortly after the sale was approved, KCKC dropped the all-80s weekends, and began including more currents/recurrents in their playlist. In addition, KCKC changed their slogan to "Today's Best Variety." Since then, KCKC has broadened their library to include hits from the 1970s to the present day.

=== 102.1 Bob FM ===
During the station's annual Christmas music run in December 2024, KCKC began teasing a change to come December 26. On that day, at 9 a.m., after playing "All I Want for Christmas is You" by Mariah Carey, KCKC flipped to adult hits, branded as "102.1 Bob FM"; the move mirrors a national network of the format, but more relevantly mirrors a similarly operated station, WRRK in Pittsburgh, operated by Steel City. The first song on "Bob" was "Girl You Know It's True" by Milli Vanilli. While the format would launch completely jockless, the entirety of the KC airstaff was announced by Steel City to retain their positions under the new format, with airstaff returning on January 13, 2025. In winter 2025, the station declined to air non-stop Christmas music, instead mixing some holiday tunes in with its regular playlist.
