= KMBZ (AM) =

News/talk radio station in Kansas City, Missouri

- Kansas City, Missouri; United States
- Broadcast area: Kansas City metropolitan area
- Frequency: 980 kHz
- Branding: Talk 980

Programming
- Format: Talk radio
- Affiliations: ABC News Radio; Compass Media Networks; KMBC-TV; Premiere Networks; Radio America

Ownership
- Owner: Audacy, Inc.; (Audacy License, LLC)
- Sister stations: KFNZ; KFNZ-FM; KMBZ-FM; KQRC-FM; KWOD; KYYS; KZPT; WDAF-FM

History
- First air date: April 5, 1922
- Former call signs: WPE (1922–1923 (deleted)); KFIX (1923 (relicensed)–1925); KLDS (1925–1927); KLDS–KMBC (1927–1929); KMBC (1929–1967); (Additional call sign KMJP (1926–1927))
- Call sign meaning: Derived from former KMBC call sign (station was formerly owned by Midland Broadcasting Company)

Technical information
- Licensing authority: FCC
- Facility ID: 6382
- Class: B
- Power: 9,000 watts (day); 5,000 watts (night)
- Transmitter coordinates: 39°2′25.02″N 94°30′30.83″W
- Repeater: 98.1 KMBZ-FM HD2 (Kansas City)

Links
- Public license information: Public file; LMS
- Webcast: Listen live (via Audacy)
- Website: www.audacy.com/talk980am

KMBZ (980 kHz) is a commercial AM radio station licensed to serve Kansas City, Missouri, owned by Audacy, Inc. KMBZ airs a talk radio format. Its studios and transmitter site are in suburban Mission, Kansas, at separate locations.

By day, KMBZ operates at 9,000 watts with a non-directional antenna. At night, it reduces power to 5,000 watts and uses a directional antenna to protect other stations on 980 AM from interference.

== History ==
KMBZ is the oldest surviving station in Kansas City, tracing its history to its debut as a broadcasting station on April 5, 1922, with the call sign WPE. It is also the third oldest radio station in Missouri, behind only KTRS and WEW. It has been owned by two rival branches of the Latter Day Saint movement, though it currently has no church affiliation.

The station was first licensed, with the randomly issued call letters WPE, on April 5, 1922, to the Central Radio Company in Kansas City, Missouri. It moved to Independence in early 1923. WPE was deleted on June 18, 1923, however, the station was relicensed a few days later, as KFIX in Independence, to the Reorganized Church of Jesus Christ of Latter Day Saints (RLDS Church). The KFIX call letters were randomly assigned from a sequential list of available call signs, and changed to KLDS in early 1925.

In 1926, the station was authorized to also operate as KMJP, "When this station is operating under the auspices of the Kansas City Journal-Post". The KMJP authorization was ended the next year.

In 1927, Midland Broadcasting began an association with the station. The call sign KMBC was added, under the provision that "Call signal KMBC assigned in addition to KLDS, which is to be used when programs are broadcast by the Midland Broadcasting Co." Program director Arthur B. Church reported broadcasting over an amateur station beginning on April 5, 1921, so this date is sometimes reported as the station's start. After being licensed for a time with the dual call sign KLDS-KMBC, in 1929 the KLDS call letters were dropped, and the station became just KMBC.

In 1953, Midland put KMBC-TV on the air as a shared time arrangement with another local radio station owner. Cook Paint and Varnish Company bought the Midland holdings in 1954. KMBC-AM-TV operated out of the Lyric Theatre.

In 1961, Cook sold the radio and television stations to Metromedia. In 1962, Metromedia signed on KMBC-FM (later KMBR and KLTH, now KZPT). In 1967, Metromedia sold both radio stations to Bonneville International but kept the television station. Bonneville is owned by the Church of Jesus Christ of Latter-day Saints (LDS Church) based in Salt Lake City, marking the second time the station was owned by an LDS Church organization. Since Metromedia held the rights to the KMBC call letters, Bonneville changed the AM station's call letters to KMBZ. The choice was deliberate; "Z" rhymes with "C", allowing Bonneville to continue trading on the old call letters. In the 1970s and early 1980s, the station's nickname was "Z-98". During those years, the station aired a full service middle of the road music format.

In 1997, Bonneville sold its entire Kansas City cluster, which by then consisted of KMBZ, KLTH, and KCMO-AM-FM, to Entercom Communications (now Audacy).

Paul Henning, who created The Beverly Hillbillies, was a writer, actor, disc jockey and newsreader at the station early in his career.

After having worked as Director of Promotion for the Kansas City Royals baseball team, Rush Limbaugh got his start in political commentary on the station in 1983. He continued to be heard on KMBZ, through his syndicated talk show, until his death in 2021. For many years KMBZ also repeated Limbaugh's show overnight.

KMBZ was the Royals flagship station for some time. For a time in the 1980s, it ceded flagship status to WIBW in Topeka, Kansas. Also, flagship status switched to WHB, a Kansas City all-sports station, from 2003 through 2007. In 2008, Royals games switched to co-owned sports radio station KCSP. Beginning in 2009, some Royals games returned to KMBZ, when KCSP is committed to another sporting event. KMBZ is also the Kansas City affiliate for the Missouri Tigers radio network, broadcasting football, men's and women's basketball and the "Tiger Talk" coach's show.

In 2009, KMBZ began simulcasting its programming on the HD3 subchannel of sister station KUDL. On March 24, 2011, Entercom announced that on March 30, KUDL's analog FM broadcasts would become a full-time simulcast of KMBZ as KMBZ-FM. On December 24, 2014, Entercom announced that the KMBZ simulcast would split on January 5, 2015; on that date, KMBZ became "Talk 980", carrying mostly syndicated shows, while KMBZ-FM began airing a mostly locally-oriented programming schedule.

On January 14, 2015, KMBZ was granted an FCC construction permit to move to the KCCV transmitter site and increase the daytime power.

== Notable former hosts ==
- Jack Cashill
- Rush Limbaugh
- Charles Wheeler
