= KFNZ (AM) =

Sports radio station in Kansas City, Missouri

Semi-simulcast of KFNZ-FM Kansas City
- Kansas City, Missouri; United States
- Broadcast area: Kansas City metropolitan area
- Frequency: 610 kHz
- Branding: The Fan AM 610

Programming
- Format: Sports
- Network: Fox Sports Radio
- Affiliations: Kansas City Chiefs; Kansas City Royals; Kansas State Wildcats

Ownership
- Owner: Audacy, Inc.; (Audacy License, LLC)
- Sister stations: KFNZ-FM; KMBZ; KMBZ-FM; KQRC-FM; KWOD; KYYS; KZPT; WDAF-FM

History
- First air date: June 5, 1922
- Former call signs: WDAF (1922–2003); KCSP (2003–2024)
- Call sign meaning: "Fans"

Technical information
- Licensing authority: FCC
- Facility ID: 11270
- Class: B
- Power: 5,000 watts
- Transmitter coordinates: 38°59′3.02″N 94°37′42.85″W
- Repeater: 96.5 KFNZ-FM HD2 (Kansas City)

Links
- Public license information: Public file; LMS
- Webcast: Listen live (via Audacy)
- Website: www.audacy.com/thefanam610

KFNZ (610 AM) is a broadcast radio station in the United States. Licensed to Kansas City, Missouri, KFNZ broadcasts a sports radio format simulcasting much of KFNZ-FM; both stations are owned by Audacy, Inc. Programming includes local sports talk shows, the Fox Sports Radio network, and live coverage of Kansas City Chiefs football, Kansas City Royals baseball, and Kansas State University football and basketball.

The station was first licensed in 1922 with call sign WDAF, founded by The Kansas City Star. It became an NBC Red Network affiliate. In 1957, the Star sold WDAF to National Theatres in order to settle an antitrust lawsuit; WDAF would later be bought by Transcontinental Television in 1960 and Taft Broadcasting in 1964. Beginning in the 1960s, the station had a pop standards music format, followed by country music from 1977 to 2003. With personalities including Bob "Hoolihan" Wells and Walt Bodine, WDAF had been among the most popular radio stations in Kansas City from the 1960s to 1990s, ranked as high as no. 1 in Arbitron local ratings in the 1980s and early 1990s; in 1983, the station was even ranked among the top 25 nationally in morning drive ratings by Radio & Records.

In 2003, WDAF changed its call sign to KCSP and picked up its current sports format, with Jason Whitlock among its inaugural hosts. In 2024, KCSP changed to KFNZ and a simulcast of KFNZ-FM.

== History ==
=== The Kansas City Star years (1922–1957) ===
Effective December 1, 1921, the Department of Commerce, which regulated radio at this time, adopted regulations setting aside two wavelengths for use by broadcasting stations: 360 meters (833 kHz) for "entertainment" programs, and 485 meters (619 kHz) for "market and weather" reports.

The station was first licensed on May 16, 1922, as WDAF, to The Kansas City Star, for operation on 360 meters. The WDAF call sign was randomly assigned from a sequential list of available call letters. Currently most stations west of the Mississippi River have call letters beginning with "K". However, WDAF was licensed before the government changed the dividing line between W and K call signs. Prior to the January 1923 establishment of the Mississippi River as the boundary, call letters beginning with "W" were generally assigned to stations east of an irregular line formed by the western state borders from North Dakota south to Texas, with calls beginning with "K" going only to stations in states west of that line.

WDAF made its debut broadcast on June 5, 1922. It bounced around various frequencies, including 750, 730, 680, 820 and 810 kHz. It moved to 610 kHz in 1928, splitting time with station WOQ, and became the sole occupant of 610 AM in Kansas City the next year when WOQ switched to 1300 kHz. WDAF carried programs from both the NBC Red Network and the Blue Network until becoming a primary NBC Red affiliate in 1930.

WDAF increased power to 5,000 watts daytime in 1935, and 5,000 watts nighttime in 1939. In 1948, the Star obtained a construction permit to create a WDAF TV station on channel 4. WDAF-TV first broadcast on October 16, 1949.

=== National Theatres, Transcontinent, and Taft ownership (1957–1977) ===
Following an antitrust lawsuit, the Kansas City Star Company signed a consent decree in November 1957 to sell WDAF-AM-TV. This lawsuit stemmed from "combination advertising and subscription rates for both morning and afternoon newspapers in a 'monopoly' newspaper market," explained Broadcasting magazine on December 9, 1957. The Star Company eventually sold the WDAF stations for $7.6 million to National Theatres Inc. through licensee National-Missouri TV in December 1957. WDAF added Bob "Hoolihan" Wells from KOCY in Oklahoma City in 1959 to host on Saturday mornings.

In 1960, National-Missouri TV sold the WDAF stations to Transcontinent Television Corporation for $9.7 million combined. Transcontinent then launched WDAF-FM on 102.1 MHz in 1961.

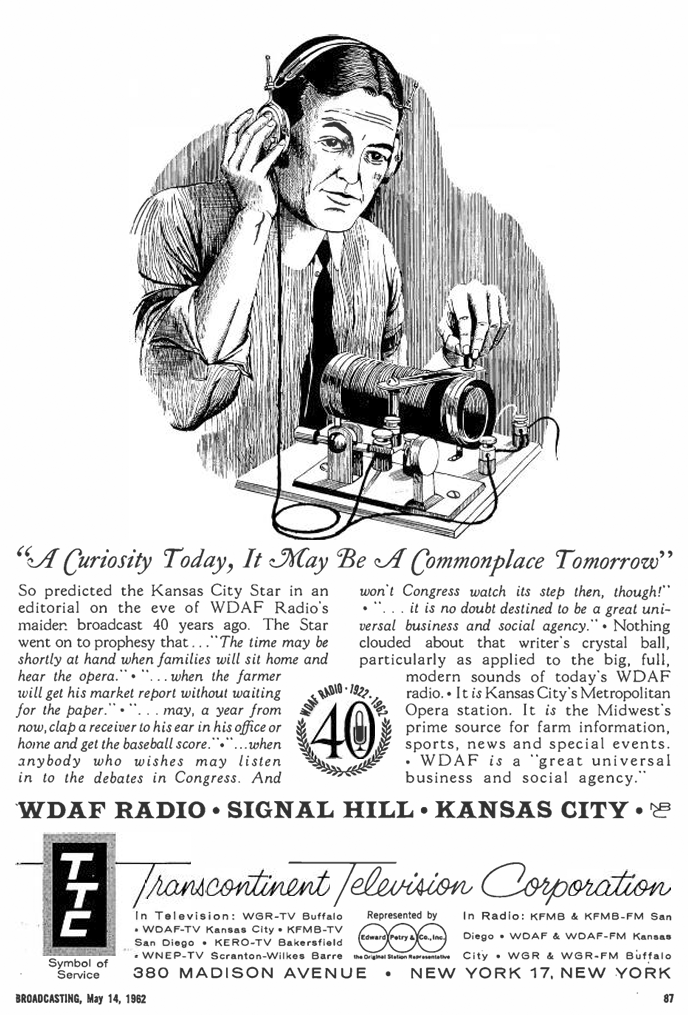
A 1962 advertisement, as WDAF, included an illustration of a 1922 listener using a crystal receiver.

Transcontinent sold off many of its TV and radio stations in 1964. WDAF-AM-FM-TV was part of a multi-market, $26.9 million purchase of stations by Taft Broadcasting. On February 19 that year, WDAF AM's broadcast license was transferred to Taft effective April 1. Taft programmed a pop standards format for WDAF, with personalities including Walt Bodine. Beginning December 13, 1964, WDAF expanded its broadcast schedule to 24 hours a day.

Through its WDAF Radio Records label, in June 1965 WDAF released WDAF Radio Presents Kansas City Jazz, a live concert album featuring Count Basie, Clare Fischer, and other jazz musicians. The AM and FM WDAF stations had initially simulcast, but beginning October 11, 1965, WDAF-FM broke away in afternoons to play contemporary pop albums following an FCC order for radio stations to separate at least 50 percent of AM and FM programming.

In February 1966, Billboard named WDAF among the most popular easy listening stations in the U.S. for a 25.3 weekday morning audience share leading the Hooper survey for Kansas City for December 1965 and January 1966. Subsequently in June 1966, Billboard observed that pop standards comprised nearly three quarters of the music on WDAF with the remainder dedicated to current hits.

=== 61 Country (1977–2003) ===
Beginning February 14, 1977, WDAF changed its format to country music and brand to "61 Country", with Randy Michaels as new operations manager. At the time, no other AM station in Kansas City had a country format. WDAF enjoyed strong ratings as a country station in the 1970s and 1980s as measured by Radio & Records surveys. In October and November 1978, WDAF was the most popular station among listeners aged 25 to 54. In spring 1983, WDAF not only topped the Kansas City ratings but also tied for 17th out of the top 25 morning drive shows nationally and fourth out of the top 25 country stations in AQH share.

In the Arbitron spring 1987 radio survey, WDAF led the Kansas City ratings with nearly 30,000 listeners per quarter hour. Later in 1987, Great American Communications bought Taft and its stations, including WDAF AM and TV, through a hostile takeover. WDAF again led the Arbitron surveys in Kansas City for spring 1988 and spring 1989.

The 1990s had multiple changes in programming, ratings, and ownership. For winter 1992, WDAF returned to the top of the Arbitron Kansas City ratings after briefly trailing FM rival KFKF. Then in 1994, following a Chapter 11 bankruptcy, Great American Communications was renamed Citicasters. WDAF again was no. 1 in winter 1993 and winter 1994. But WDAF fell to third, with KFKF taking over the no. 1 spot in spring 1995. WDAF returned to no. 1 for winter 1995 and spring 1996. However, spring 1996 would be the last time WDAF ranked no. 1; WDAF remained a top-five station but trailed KFKF and other FM competitors like KPRS for much of 1996 and 1997. In the fall 1999 Arbitron ratings, WDAF had a 6.6 share, fourth overall but best among four country stations.

From 1992 to 1994, WDAF was the flagship station for the Kansas City Royals radio network, before KMBZ regained the Royals broadcast rights beginning in 1995. A Kansas City Star writer criticized WDAF's Royals postgame talk show as the "worst call-in show" on local sports radio.

In 1994, the WDAF stations separated, when New World Communications purchased WDAF-TV and three other Great American Communications TV stations for a combined $350 million. Jacor purchased WDAF and other Citicasters stations in 1996. WDAF AM was purchased twice in 1997, first by American Radio Systems in June, then Entercom in October. Following the purchase, the station's newroom was combined with that of sister stations KMBZ and KCMO. WDAF and other Entercom stations broadcast out of a studio on Belinder Road in Westwood, Kansas; in 2016, the Shawnee Mission School District purchased the Belinder Road Entercom building, and the building was demolished in 2021 in preparation for a new elementary school funded by a voter-approved bond measure.

In 2002, WDAF signed a contract with the University of Missouri's Tiger Radio Network to broadcast football and Missouri Tigers men's basketball games and weekly talk shows. In spring 2003, WDAF ranked fourth in the Arbitron Kansas City ratings with a 5.4 share.

=== 610 Sports (2003–2024) ===
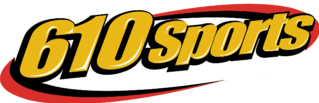
Logo as "610 Sports"

In 2003, Entercom announced it would move WDAF to 106.5 on the FM dial, and would flip AM 610 to sports talk to compete against WHB. At 2 p.m. on September 10, 2003, the station became KCSP, "61 Sports" (later "610 Sports"). Jason Whitlock was among its inaugural local hosts, and The Jim Rome Show would move to KCSP from WHB effective December 8.

With the format change did some an initial ratings drop, with WDAF's rating share going down from 5.6 in summer 2003 to 2.8 in fall 2003; KCSP's first full quarter returned a 2.2 in winter 2004. By fall 2004, KCSP began overtaking WHB in some ratings surveys, but WHB jumped far ahead by the winter, with some shows beating KCSP by five or more points among men aged 25 to 54.

Kansas Jayhawk sports moved to KCSP in September 2006. Kansas City Royals baseball began airing on KCSP in the 2008 season. In 2012, KCSP dropped The Jim Rome Show in favor of expanding its local programming.

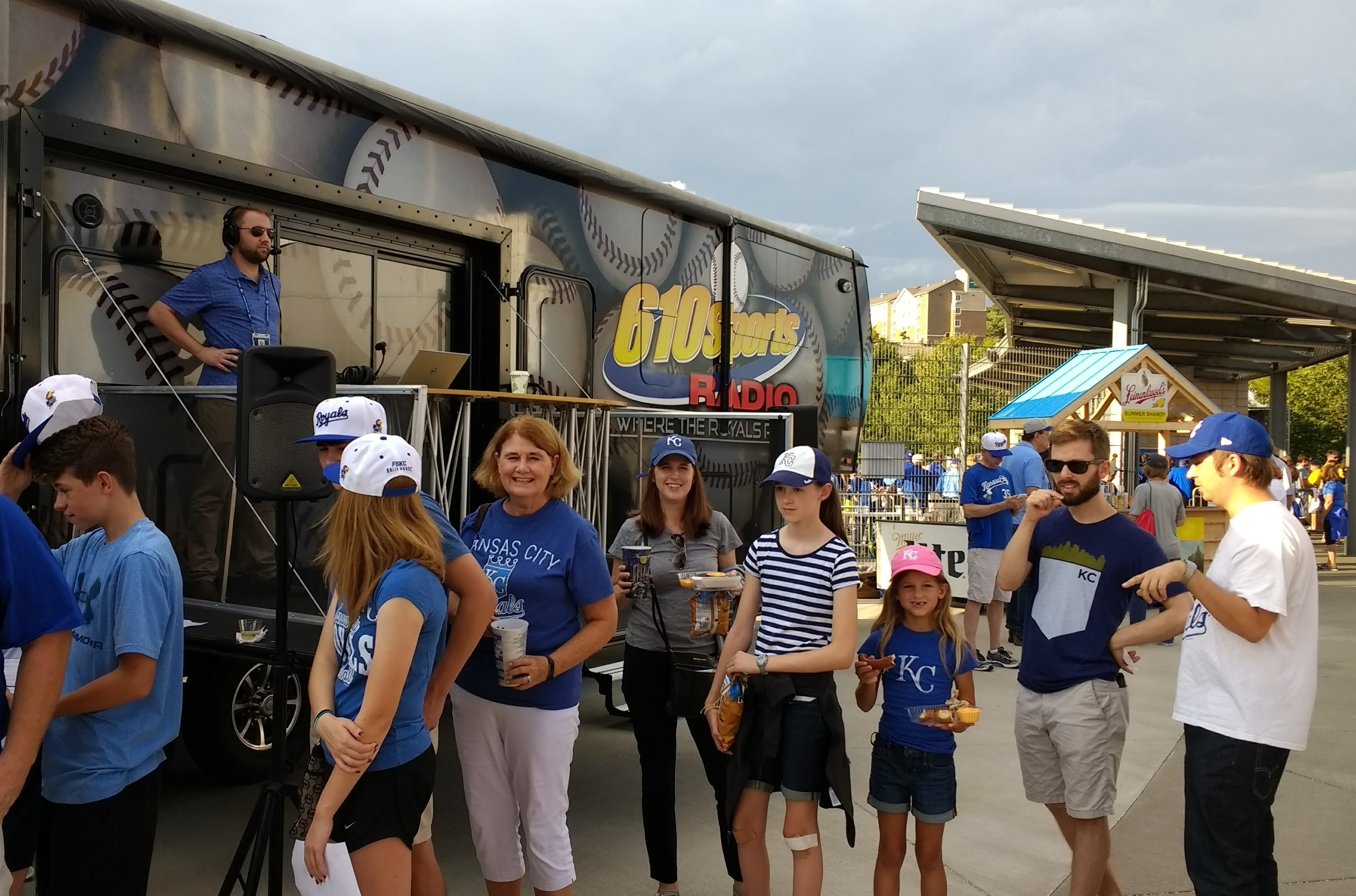
610 Sports hosts a remote broadcast at Kauffman Stadium in 2017.

Beginning with the 2020 season, KCSP joined the Kansas City Chiefs radio network to provide live coverage of news conferences with head coach Andy Reid and quarterback Patrick Mahomes, in addition to the weekly Chiefs Kingdom Radio Show; Chiefs games would be on sister station WDAF-FM.

=== 96.5 The Fan (2024–present) ===
On August 8, 2024, at 10 a.m., KCSP announced that it would begin simulcasting on FM sister station KRBZ beginning August 15, and rebrand as "96.5 The Fan". The FM side, which adopted the KFNZ-FM callsign, would become the new flagship station for the Kansas City Chiefs (which had been on WDAF-FM) and the Royals with the move. In case of event conflicts, some Royals games would remain solely on 610 AM, which would also take on the KFNZ call sign.

== Technical information ==
KFNZ is a Class B regional station, with a power of 5,000 watts, both the daytime and nighttime, using a non-directional antenna on one tower. The transmitter is off Mission Road in Prairie Village, Kansas. Programming is also heard on the HD2 subchannel of KFNZ-FM.

== See also ==
- List of initial AM-band station grants in the United States
