= KCNW =

- Fairway, Kansas; United States
- Broadcast area: Kansas City, Missouri
- Frequency: 1380 kHz

Programming
- Format: Christian radio
- Affiliations: Salem Communications

Ownership
- Owner: Wilkins Communication Network, Inc.; (Kansas City Radio, Inc.)

Technical information
- Licensing authority: FCC
- Facility ID: 10826
- Class: D
- Power: 2,500 watts day 29 watts night
- Transmitter coordinates: 39°4′19″N 94°40′58″W
- Translators: K241CU (96.1 MHz, Fairway)

Links
- Public license information: Public file; LMS
- Website: wilkinsradio.com

KCNW (1380 AM) is an American radio station licensed to serve the community of Fairway, Kansas. The station broadcasts a religious radio format to the Kansas City metropolitan area with a 2,500-watt daytime and 29-watt nighttime signal. KCNW is owned by Wilkins Communication Network and the broadcast license is held by Kansas City Radio, Inc.

== History ==
The 1380 AM frequency was a prominent part of the Kansas City radio market for two decades under the call sign KUDL. The station operated as KUDL from approximately 1953 to 1975. In the 1960s, KUDL was the home to a popular Top 40 station. During this time, it was a high-energy competitor to WHB's dominant format, known for its streamlined style referred to as "Boss Radio" and nicknamed "the Big 1380".

In 1967, Starr Broadcasting acquired both KUDL (1380 AM) and its sister FM station, KCJC. The FM station would eventually adopt the KUDL-FM call sign and initially simulcast the popular AM Top 40 format In 1973, the Top-40 format jumped to FM and eventually became a soft adult contemporary station, while 1380 housed an oldies format for two years. The KCNW letters (Kansas City's News World) were adopted shortly after a news format debuted with programming from the short-lived "News and Information Service" based at NBC Radio. Although following the lead of other AM stations dumping music for talk (notable KQV in Pittsburgh the same year), the news format didn't last long in Kansas City.

In 1978, KCNW started broadcasting religious programming, yielding the acronym Kansas City's New Way. Today it is a satellite station owned by Wilkins Communication Network of Spartanburg, South Carolina, which specializes in syndicating programs devised by individual churches and airs national shows such as Sid Roth, Irvin Baxter Jr. and Noah Hutchings.
