= Mission, Kansas =

- City
- Location within Johnson County and Kansas
- Interactive map of Mission, Kansas
- Coordinates: 39°01′37″N 94°39′25″W
- Country: United States
- State: Kansas
- County: Johnson
- Incorporated: 1951

Government
  - Mayor: Sollie Flora

Area
  - Total: 2.68 sq mi (6.93 km^{2})
  - Land: 2.67 sq mi (6.91 km^{2})
  - Water: 0.0077 sq mi (0.02 km^{2})
- Elevation: 1,004 ft (306 m)

Population (2020)
  - Total: 9,954
  - Density: 3,730/sq mi (1,440/km^{2})
- Time zone: UTC-6 (CST)
  - Summer (DST): UTC-5 (CDT)
- ZIP Codes: 66201, 66202, 66205, 66222
- Area code: 913
- FIPS code: 20-47225
- GNIS ID: 485623
- Website: missionks.org

Mission is a city in Johnson County, Kansas, United States, and part of the Kansas City Metropolitan Area. As of the 2020 census, the population of the city was 9,954.

== History ==
An Indian mission was established in 1829 at the town's site, hence the name of the later settlement.

Today, the town is broken into lots, with small houses of different designs on large lots.

== Geography ==
According to the United States Census Bureau, the city has a total area of 2.68 square miles (6.94 km^{2}), of which 2.67 square miles (6.92 km^{2}) is land and 0.01 square miles (0.03 km^{2}) is water.

== Demographics ==
Historical population
Census	Pop.	Note	%±
1960	4,626		—
1970	8,376		81.1%
1980	8,643		3.2%
1990	9,504		10.0%
2000	9,727		2.3%
2010	9,323		−4.2%
2020	9,954		6.8%
U.S. Decennial Census; 2010-2020

=== Racial and ethnic composition ===
Mission city, Kansas – Racial and ethnic composition Note: the US Census treats Hispanic/Latino as an ethnic category. This table excludes Latinos from the racial categories and assigns them to a separate category. Hispanics/Latinos may be of any race.
Race / Ethnicity (NH = Non-Hispanic)	Pop 2000	Pop 2010	Pop 2020	% 2000	% 2010	% 2020
White alone (NH)	8,417	7,440	7,359	86.53%	79.80%	73.93%
Black or African American alone (NH)	355	490	461	3.65%	5.26%	4.63%
Native American or Alaska Native alone (NH)	31	33	19	0.32%	0.35%	0.19%
Asian alone (NH)	268	363	400	2.76%	3.89%	4.02%
Native Hawaiian or Pacific Islander alone (NH)	1	2	10	0.01%	0.02%	0.10%
Other race alone (NH)	16	12	41	0.16%	0.13%	0.41%
Mixed race or Multiracial (NH)	161	216	526	1.66%	2.32%	5.28%
Hispanic or Latino (any race)	478	767	1,138	4.91%	8.23%	11.43%
Total	9,727	9,323	9,954	100.00%	100.00%	100.00%

=== 2020 census ===
As of the 2020 census, Mission had a population of 9,954. The census counted 5,295 households and 2,240 families. The median age was 35.6 years. 14.1% of residents were under the age of 18 and 17.6% were 65 years of age or older. For every 100 females there were 92.3 males, and for every 100 females age 18 and over there were 90.4 males age 18 and over.

100.0% of residents lived in urban areas, while 0.0% lived in rural areas.

There were 5,295 households, of which 17.0% had children under the age of 18 living in them. Of all households, 30.2% were married-couple households, 27.3% were households with a male householder and no spouse or partner present, and 34.5% were households with a female householder and no spouse or partner present. About 46.3% of all households were made up of individuals and 12.8% had someone living alone who was 65 years of age or older.

There were 5,641 housing units, of which 6.1% were vacant. The homeowner vacancy rate was 1.3% and the rental vacancy rate was 7.3%. The population density was 3,730.9 per square mile (1,440.5/km^{2}), and there were 2,114.3 housing units per square mile (816.3/km^{2}).

Racial composition as of the 2020 census
Race	Number	Percent
White	7,693	77.3%
Black or African American	479	4.8%
American Indian and Alaska Native	36	0.4%
Asian	401	4.0%
Native Hawaiian and Other Pacific Islander	10	0.1%
Some other race	321	3.2%
Two or more races	1,014	10.2%

=== Demographic estimates ===
The percent of those with a bachelor's degree or higher was estimated to be 46.1% of the population. The average household size was 2.0 and the average family size was 2.6.

=== Income and poverty ===
The 2016–2020 5-year American Community Survey estimates show that the median household income was $64,703 (with a margin of error of +/- $8,080) and the median family income was $85,794 (+/- $6,041). Males had a median income of $48,004 (+/- $2,808) versus $32,500 (+/- $3,458) for females. The median income for those above 16 years old was $40,964 (+/- $2,424). Approximately, 3.9% of families and 9.5% of the population were below the poverty line, including 8.9% of those under the age of 18 and 2.9% of those ages 65 or over.

=== 2010 census ===
As of the census of 2010, there were 9,323 people, 5,000 households, and 2,130 families living in the city. The population density was 3,491.8 inhabitants per square mile (1,348.2/km^{2}). There were 5,477 housing units at an average density of 2,051.3 per square mile (792.0/km^{2}). The racial makeup of the city was 84.6% White, 5.5% African American, 0.4% Native American, 3.9% Asian, 2.6% from other races, and 3.0% from two or more races. Hispanic or Latino of any race were 8.2% of the population.

There were 5,000 households, of which 18.3% had children under the age of 18 living with them, 31.0% were married couples living together, 8.6% had a female householder with no husband present, 3.0% had a male householder with no wife present, and 57.4% were non-families. 46.8% of all households were made up of individuals, and 10% had someone living alone who was 65 years of age or older. The average household size was 1.86 and the average family size was 2.69.

The median age in the city was 35.2 years. 16.1% of residents were under the age of 18; 10% were between the ages of 18 and 24; 36.6% were from 25 to 44; 23.9% were from 45 to 64; and 13.4% were 65 years of age or older. The gender makeup of the city was 47.5% male and 52.5% female.

== Economy ==
The agricultural and transport company Seaboard Corporation has corporate offices located just to the west of Mission in the city of Merriam. The United States Postal Service lumps many addresses in the Johnson County, KS suburbs under the combined name of "Shawnee Mission, Kansas", although this refers to a historical mission, Shawnee Methodist Mission. Shawnee is considerably larger than Mission and the postal name of Shawnee Mission applies to a far larger area and population than the combined total of just those two incorporated cities. The postal address of Seaboard's offices is "Shawnee Mission".

Radio station clusters owned by Cumulus Media and Entercom have their studios in Mission.

== Government ==
The City of Mission offers several assistance programs to help residents maintain the exteriors of their homes. These programs include Mission Possible, an effort to help elderly and disabled individuals remove dilapidated structures, physical barriers, and make basic repairs to their homes and property. The city also provides free paint and primer to low income residents to maintain the aesthetics of their homes.

Mission is a member of the national Mayors Climate Protection Agreement, an effort encouraging cities to reduce greenhouse emissions.

== Libraries ==
The Johnson County Library serves the residents of Johnson County, KS, including Mission, KS. It has thirteen locations county wide. JCL's Antioch Road location in Merriam, KS is just to the west and the Cedar Roe location in Roeland Park, Kansas is just to the north. However, the library does not have a location in Mission proper.

== Notable people ==
Notable individuals who were born in and/or have lived in Mission include:

- Bart Evans (1947– ), polo player
- Earl Eugene O'Connor (1922–1998), U.S. federal judge
- James B. Pearson (1920–2009), U.S. Senator from Kansas
- Michael Sull (1949– ), calligrapher
- Grant Wahl (1974–2022), sports journalist
