= School District 207 =

School District 207 may refer to:

- Maine Township High School District 207
- Fort Leavenworth Unified School District 207
- Peotone School District 207-U
