= Leavenworth, Kansas =

City and county seat in Kansas, United States

- City and County seat
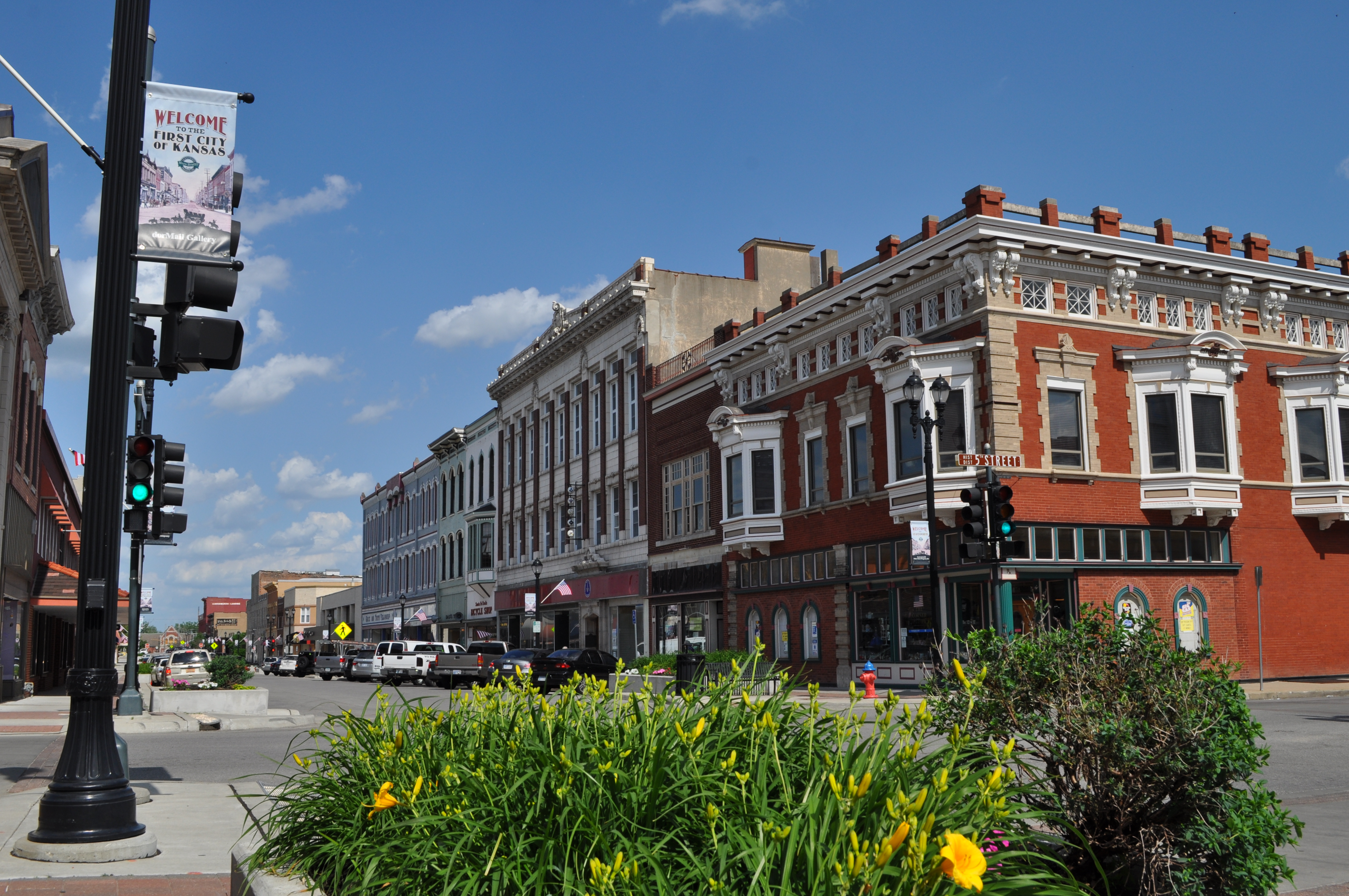
- Downtown Leavenworth (2014)

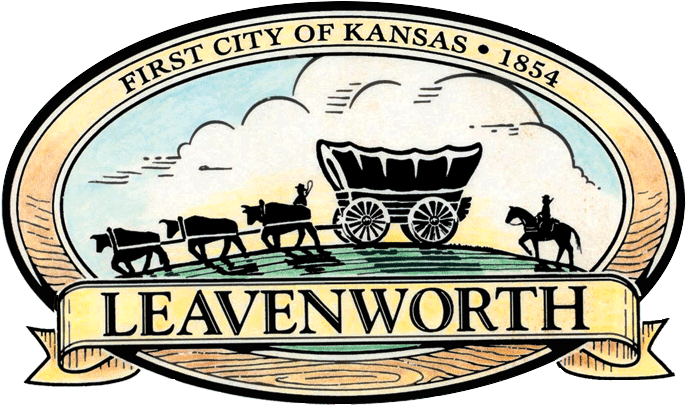
- Seal
- Motto: First City of Kansas
- Location within Leavenworth County and Kansas

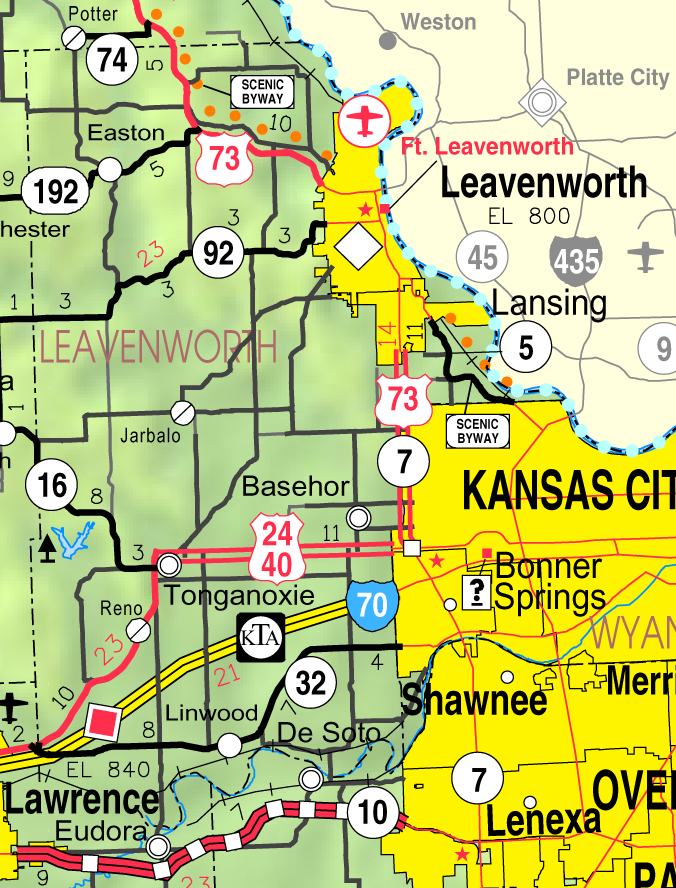
- KDOT map of Leavenworth County (legend)
- Coordinates: 39°19′22″N 94°55′27″W
- Country: United States
- State: Kansas
- County: Leavenworth
- Founded: 1854
- Incorporated: 1855

Government
  - Type: Commission-Manager
  - Mayor: Nancy Bauder
  - City Manager: Scott Peterson

Area
  - Total: 24.31 sq mi (62.95 km^{2})
  - Land: 24.24 sq mi (62.79 km^{2})
  - Water: 0.062 sq mi (0.16 km^{2})
- Elevation: 840 ft (260 m)

Population (2020)
  - Total: 37,351
  - Density: 1,541/sq mi (594.9/km^{2})
- Time zone: UTC-6 (CST)
  - Summer (DST): UTC-5 (CDT)
- ZIP Codes: 66043, 66048
- Area code: 913
- GNIS ID: 485610
- Website: www.leavenworthks.gov

Leavenworth (/ˈlɛvənˌwɜːrθ/) is the county seat of and the largest city in Leavenworth County, Kansas, United States. Part of the Kansas City metropolitan area, Leavenworth is located on the west bank of the Missouri River, on the site of Fort Leavenworth, built in 1827. The city became known in American history for its role as a key supply base in the settlement of the American West. During the Civil War, many volunteers joined the Union Army from Leavenworth. The city has been notable as the location of several prisons, particularly the United States Disciplinary Barracks and United States Penitentiary, Leavenworth. As of the 2020 census, the population of the city was 37,351.

== History ==
Leavenworth, founded in 1854, was the first city incorporated in the territory of Kansas. The city developed south of Fort Leavenworth, which was established as Cantonment Leavenworth in 1827 by Colonel Henry Leavenworth. Its location on the Missouri River attracted refugee African-American slaves in the antebellum years, who were seeking freedom from the slave state of Missouri across the river. Abolition supporters helped them find refuge. In the years before the Civil War, Leavenworth was a hotbed of anti-slavery and pro-slavery agitation, often leading to open physical confrontations on the street and in public meetings.

On April 3, 1858, the "Leavenworth Constitution" for the state of Kansas was adopted here. Although the federal government never approved this early version of the state constitution, it was considered one of the most radical of the four constitutions drafted for the new territory because it recognized freed black people as citizens.

Refugee African Americans continued to settle in the city during the war. By 1865, it had attracted nearly one-fifth of the 12,000 black people in the state. In 1866, the 10th Regiment of Cavalry, an all-black unit within the U.S. Army, was stood up at Fort Leavenworth. Charles Henry Langston was an African-American leader from Ohio who worked and lived in Leavenworth and northeastern Kansas in the Reconstruction era and afterward. In Kansas, Langston worked for black suffrage and the right of African Americans to sit on juries, testify in court, and have their children educated in common schools. African Americans gained suffrage in 1870 after passage of the federal 15th constitutional amendment, and the legislature voted for their right to sit on juries in 1874.

African Americans continued to migrate to the state of Kansas after the war. There were a total of 17,108 African Americans in Kansas in 1870, with 43,107 in 1880, and 52,003 by 1900, most of whom lived in urban areas.

=== 20th century to present ===
Fred Alexander, a 22-year-old black veteran of the Spanish–American War, was arrested on circumstantial evidence following months of assaults on young white women in late 1900. Witnesses had identified a "large white man" and a "slight black man" as having been seen in the vicinity of the attacks, Police moved him to the penitentiary during questioning, but a lynch mob was forming in Leavenworth. The sheriff needed to bring him to Leavenworth for arraignment at the county court. He refused the governor's offer of state militia, and was unable to protect the prisoner. On January 15, 1901, Alexander was taken from jail by a mob of 5,000 people and to the site of the murder of Pearl Forbes, where he was brutally lynched: burned alive. He protested his innocence to the end. An inquest concluded he had been killed by "persons unknown".

His family refused to claim his body for burial. His father Alfred Alexander, an exoduster, said "The people have mutilated him, now let them bury him." The city arranged burial. African Americans in the region were horrified at Alexander's murder by the mob and created the first state chapter of the Afro-American Council, then the only national organization working for civil rights. (The National Association for the Advancement of Colored People (NAACP) was founded a few years later, and absorbed most members of the AAC.)

In 1972 Benjamin Day became the city's first African-American mayor. Day had been elected to the City Commission one year earlier. Leavenworth appoints its mayor from among the members of the commission, and Day was named mayor in 1971. Day was a former educator and principal in Leavenworth.

Fort Leavenworth was located outside the city limits until its territory was annexed by the city on April 12, 1977.

In 2008, an underground series of "vaults" was found in the city, apparently built during the late 19th century.

== Geography ==
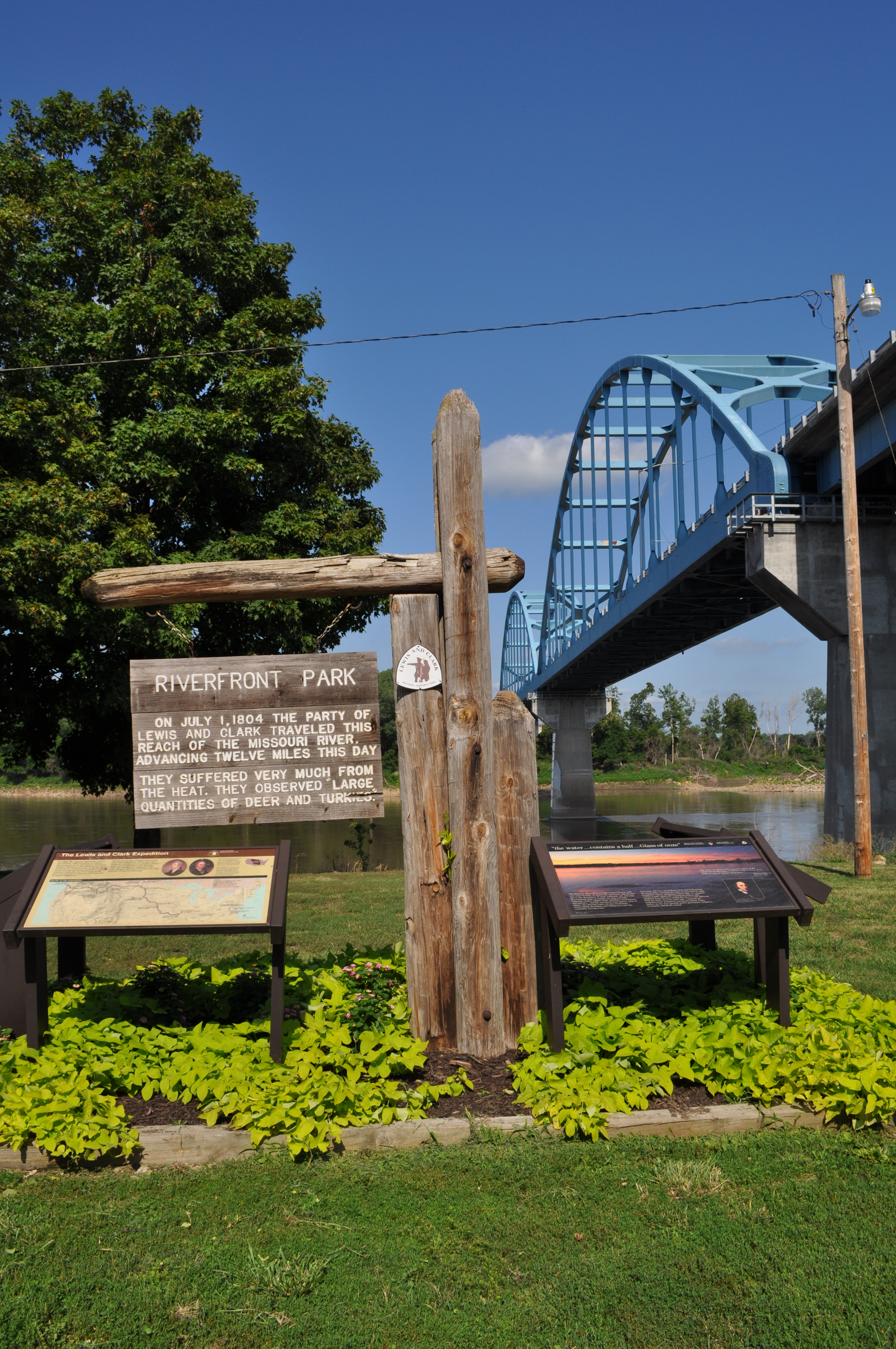
Leavenworth is on the west bank of the Missouri River

Leavenworth is located in northeastern Kansas at the junction of U.S. Route 73 and Kansas Highway 92 (K-92), Leavenworth is 25 mi (40 km) northwest of downtown Kansas City, 145 mi (233 km) south-southeast of Omaha, and 165 mi (266 km) northeast of Wichita.

The city lies on the west bank of the Missouri River in the Dissected Till Plains region of North America's Central Lowlands. Four small tributaries of the river flow generally east through the city. From north to south, these are Quarry Creek, Corral Creek, Three Mile Creek, and Five Mile Creek.

According to the United States Census Bureau, the city has a total area of 24.06 square miles (62.32 km^{2}), of which 24.04 square miles (62.26 km^{2}) is land and 0.02 square miles (0.05 km^{2}) is water. Fort Leavenworth occupies the northern half of the city's area.

Leavenworth, along with the rest of Leavenworth County, lies within the Kansas City metropolitan area. Lansing is located to the south.

=== Climate ===
Leavenworth experiences a humid continental climate (Köppen Dfa), with hot, humid summers and cold, drier winters. On average, January is the coldest month, July is the hottest month, and June is the wettest month.

Climate data for Leavenworth, Kansas, 1991–2020 normals, extremes 1891–present
Month	Jan	Feb	Mar	Apr	May	Jun	Jul	Aug	Sep	Oct	Nov	Dec	Year
Record high °F (°C)	74 (23)	84 (29)	90 (32)	95 (35)	103 (39)	106 (41)	110 (43)	114 (46)	111 (44)	98 (37)	85 (29)	75 (24)	114 (46)
Mean maximum °F (°C)	61.5 (16.4)	66.9 (19.4)	78.3 (25.7)	85.0 (29.4)	89.1 (31.7)	94.5 (34.7)	98.4 (36.9)	98.0 (36.7)	91.7 (33.2)	86.6 (30.3)	72.1 (22.3)	62.3 (16.8)	100.4 (38.0)
Mean daily maximum °F (°C)	39.3 (4.1)	44.8 (7.1)	56.6 (13.7)	67.0 (19.4)	76.9 (24.9)	86.2 (30.1)	90.5 (32.5)	88.7 (31.5)	80.5 (26.9)	68.0 (20.0)	54.1 (12.3)	42.9 (6.1)	66.3 (19.1)
Daily mean °F (°C)	30.0 (−1.1)	34.6 (1.4)	45.0 (7.2)	55.6 (13.1)	66.1 (18.9)	75.4 (24.1)	79.9 (26.6)	78.3 (25.7)	69.4 (20.8)	57.2 (14.0)	44.2 (6.8)	33.9 (1.1)	55.8 (13.2)
Mean daily minimum °F (°C)	20.7 (−6.3)	24.3 (−4.3)	33.5 (0.8)	44.2 (6.8)	55.3 (12.9)	64.6 (18.1)	69.2 (20.7)	68.0 (20.0)	58.3 (14.6)	46.4 (8.0)	34.2 (1.2)	24.9 (−3.9)	45.3 (7.4)
Mean minimum °F (°C)	−0.6 (−18.1)	5.6 (−14.7)	14.5 (−9.7)	27.1 (−2.7)	39.3 (4.1)	52.0 (11.1)	58.5 (14.7)	55.0 (12.8)	41.7 (5.4)	29.3 (−1.5)	17.0 (−8.3)	5.8 (−14.6)	−3.9 (−19.9)
Record low °F (°C)	−22 (−30)	−21 (−29)	−10 (−23)	4 (−16)	27 (−3)	42 (6)	45 (7)	41 (5)	27 (−3)	16 (−9)	−2 (−19)	−27 (−33)	−27 (−33)
Average precipitation inches (mm)	1.05 (27)	1.58 (40)	2.36 (60)	4.11 (104)	5.24 (133)	5.49 (139)	4.32 (110)	5.30 (135)	4.58 (116)	3.56 (90)	1.98 (50)	1.70 (43)	41.27 (1,047)
Average snowfall inches (cm)	4.8 (12)	5.6 (14)	1.5 (3.8)	0.0 (0.0)	0.0 (0.0)	0.0 (0.0)	0.0 (0.0)	0.0 (0.0)	0.0 (0.0)	0.4 (1.0)	1.0 (2.5)	5.5 (14)	18.8 (47.3)
Average precipitation days (≥ 0.01 in)	4.6	5.1	7.3	9.5	10.8	10.1	8.3	7.2	7.5	7.5	5.8	4.9	88.6
Average snowy days (≥ 0.1 in)	2.5	2.1	0.9	0.0	0.0	0.0	0.0	0.0	0.0	0.1	0.6	2.5	8.7
Source: NOAA

== Demographics ==
Historical population
Census	Pop.	Note	%±
1860	7,429		—
1870	17,873		140.6%
1880	16,546		−7.4%
1890	19,768		19.5%
1900	20,735		4.9%
1910	19,363		−6.6%
1920	16,912		−12.7%
1930	17,466		3.3%
1940	19,220		10.0%
1950	20,579		7.1%
1960	22,052		7.2%
1970	25,147		14.0%
1980	33,656		33.8%
1990	38,495		14.4%
2000	35,420		−8.0%
2010	35,251		−0.5%
2020	37,351		6.0%
2023 (est.)	37,034		−0.8%
U.S. Decennial Census; 2010-2020

Leavenworth is the 10th most populated city in the Kansas City metropolitan area.

=== Racial and ethnic composition ===
Leavenworth city, Kansas – Racial and ethnic composition Note: the US Census treats Hispanic/Latino as an ethnic category. This table excludes Latinos from the racial categories and assigns them to a separate category. Hispanics/Latinos may be of any race.
Race / Ethnicity (NH = Non-Hispanic)	Pop 2000	Pop 2010	Pop 2020	% 2000	% 2010	% 2020
White alone (NH)	26,230	24,872	25,130	74.05%	70.56%	67.28%
Black or African American alone (NH)	5,656	5,215	4,993	15.97%	14.79%	13.37%
Native American or Alaska Native alone (NH)	242	267	346	0.68%	0.76%	0.93%
Asian alone (NH)	518	612	642	1.46%	1.74%	1.72%
Native Hawaiian or Pacific Islander alone (NH)	57	73	109	0.16%	0.21%	0.29%
Other race alone (NH)	99	42	148	0.28%	0.12%	0.40%
Mixed race or Multiracial (NH)	818	1,303	2,689	2.31%	3.70%	7.20%
Hispanic or Latino (any race)	1,800	2,867	3,294	5.08%	8.13%	8.82%
Total	35,420	35,251	37,351	100.00%	100.00%	100.00%

=== 2020 census ===
As of the 2020 census, Leavenworth had a population of 37,351, 13,143 households, and 8,369 families. The population density was 1,540.7 per square mile (594.9/km^{2}). There were 14,756 housing units at an average density of 608.7 per square mile (235.0/km^{2}).

The median age was 35.4 years; 24.6% of residents were under the age of 18, 9.0% were from 18 to 24, 31.1% were from 25 to 44, 22.2% were from 45 to 64, and 12.9% were 65 years of age or older. For every 100 females there were 117.8 males, and for every 100 females age 18 and over there were 120.3 males.

98.9% of residents lived in urban areas, while 1.1% lived in rural areas.

Of the 13,143 households, 34.0% had children under the age of 18 living in them. Of all households, 45.6% were married-couple households, 21.2% were households with a male householder and no spouse or partner present, and 26.8% were households with a female householder and no spouse or partner present. About 31.0% of all households were made up of individuals and 11.1% had someone living alone who was 65 years of age or older. The average household size was 2.5 and the average family size was 3.1.

Of the housing units, 10.9% were vacant. The homeowner vacancy rate was 2.0% and the rental vacancy rate was 11.7%.

Racial composition as of the 2020 census
Race	Number	Percent
White	26,523	71.0%
Black or African American	5,145	13.8%
American Indian and Alaska Native	405	1.1%
Asian	666	1.8%
Native Hawaiian and Other Pacific Islander	117	0.3%
Some other race	742	2.0%
Two or more races	3,753	10.0%

=== Education ===
The percent of those with a bachelor's degree or higher was estimated to be 22.7% of the population.

=== Income and poverty ===
The 2016–2020 5-year American Community Survey estimates show that the median household income was $60,870 (with a margin of error of +/- $3,391) and the median family income was $81,133 (+/- $5,077). Males had a median income of $36,795 (+/- $4,066) versus $25,100 (+/- $2,878) for females. The median income for those above 16 years old was $31,027 (+/- $2,275). Approximately, 7.7% of families and 12.2% of the population were below the poverty line, including 13.7% of those under the age of 18 and 6.4% of those ages 65 or over.

=== 2010 census ===
As of the 2010 United States census, there were 35,251 people, 12,256 households, and 8,129 families residing in the city. The population density was 1,466 inhabitants per square mile (566/km^{2}). There were 13,670 housing units at an average density of 568.6 per square mile (219.5/km^{2}). The racial makeup of the city was 75.4% White, 15.1% African American, 0.9% American Indian, 1.8% Asian, 0.2% Pacific Islander, 2.0% from other races, and 4.6% from two or more races. Hispanics and Latinos of any race were 8.1% of the population.

There were 12,256 households, of which 34.6% had children under the age of 18 living with them, 48.7% were married couples living together, 13.2% had a female householder with no husband present, 4.4% had a male householder with no wife present, and 33.7% were non-families. 28.7% of all households were made up of individuals, and 9.5% had someone living alone who was 65 years of age or older. The average household size was 2.55, and the average family size was 3.15.

The median age in the city was 34.8 years. 26% of residents were under the age of 18; 8.5% were between the ages of 18 and 24; 31.6% were from 25 to 44; 23.9% were from 45 to 64; and 10% were 65 years of age or older. The gender makeup of the city was 53.9% male and 46.1% female.

The median income for a household in the city was $49,823, and the median income for a family was $61,576. Males had a median income of $49,693 versus $30,888 for females. The per capita income for the city was $23,102. About 9.8% of families and 12.9% of the population were below the poverty line, including 16.4% of those under age 18 and 10.0% of those age 65 or over.

=== Religion ===
Leavenworth contains a number of religious traditions stemming from its history and international military population. In the mid to late 19th century, Leavenworth had one of the largest Jewish communities in Kansas, made up of immigrants from Europe. Leavenworth had multiple Orthodox congregations by 1870. Over generations many Jews ultimately intermarried and their descendants became Christian.

There are two United Methodist Churches, the First United Methodist Church and Trinity United Methodist Church. Other Protestant churches include Lutheran, Episcopal, Southern Baptist, American Baptist, African Methodist Episcopal, United Church of Christ, Presbyterian, Community Church of Christ, Church of the Nazarene, Grace and Truth Fellowship, Assemblies of God, and Seventh-Day Adventist. Other religious institutions include a Church of Jesus Christ of Latter-day Saints and the Islamic Center of Leavenworth, A few churches conduct services in Hangul.

Leavenworth is part of the Archdiocese of Kansas City, Kansas, with two Roman Catholic parishes in the city. Leavenworth was originally the Roman Catholic Diocese of the Indian Territory. It stretched some 600 miles from the West bank of the Missouri River to the summit of the Rockies, and about three times that distance from the Canadian border on the North to the Red River on the South. John Baptist Miège was the first Bishop of the Leavenworth Archdiocese, and erected the Cathedral of the Immaculate Conception, completed in 1854 and dedicated on December 8, 1854, on the Feast of the Immaculate Conception. It remained the cathedral until Bishop George Donnelly moved the see city of the Diocese to Kansas City Kansas in 1947.

== Economy ==
As of 2010, 58.6% of the population over the age of 16 was in the labor force. 7.8% was in the armed forces, and 50.8% was in the civilian labor force with 47.0% being employed and 3.8% unemployed. The composition, by occupation, of the employed civilian labor force was: 34.5% in management, business, science, and arts; 22.8% in sales and office occupations; 23.2% in service occupations; 8.4% in natural resources, construction, and maintenance; 11.0% in production, transportation, and material moving. The three industries employing the largest percentages of the working civilian labor force were: educational services, health care, and social assistance (22.7%); public administration (15.6%); and retail trade (13.0%). The U.S. military at Fort Leavenworth is the city's largest employer, employing roughly 5,600 people, followed by Leavenworth Public Schools and the Department of Veterans Affairs Eastern Kansas Health Care System.

The cost of living in Leavenworth is below average; compared to a U.S. average of 100, the cost of living index for the city is 87.1. As of 2010, the median home value in the city was $124,200, the median selected monthly owner cost was $1,282 for housing units with a mortgage and $428 for those without, and the median gross rent was $762.

=== Top employers ===
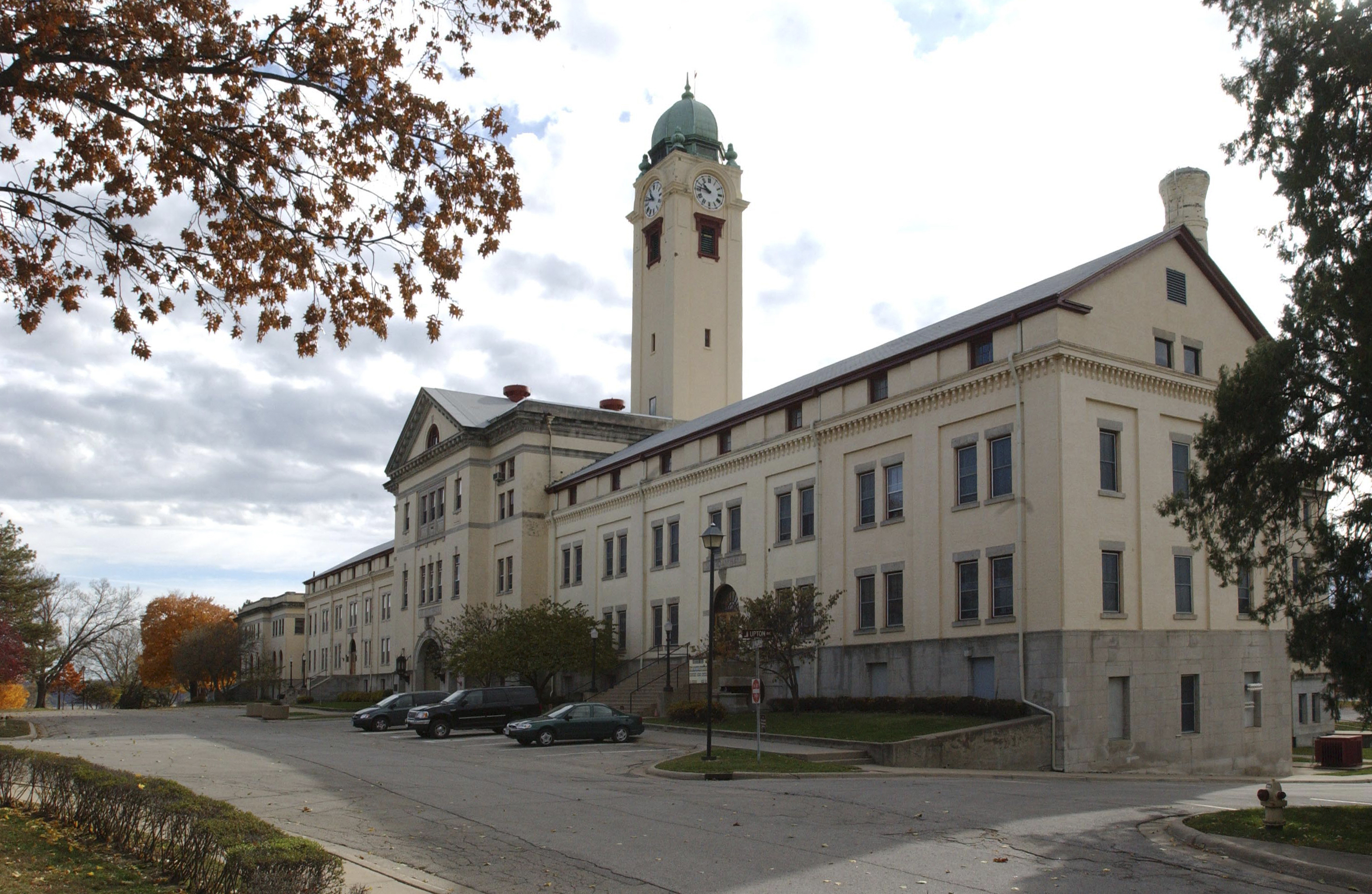
Grant Hall, the symbol of Fort Leavenworth and headquarters of the U.S. Army Combined Arms Center

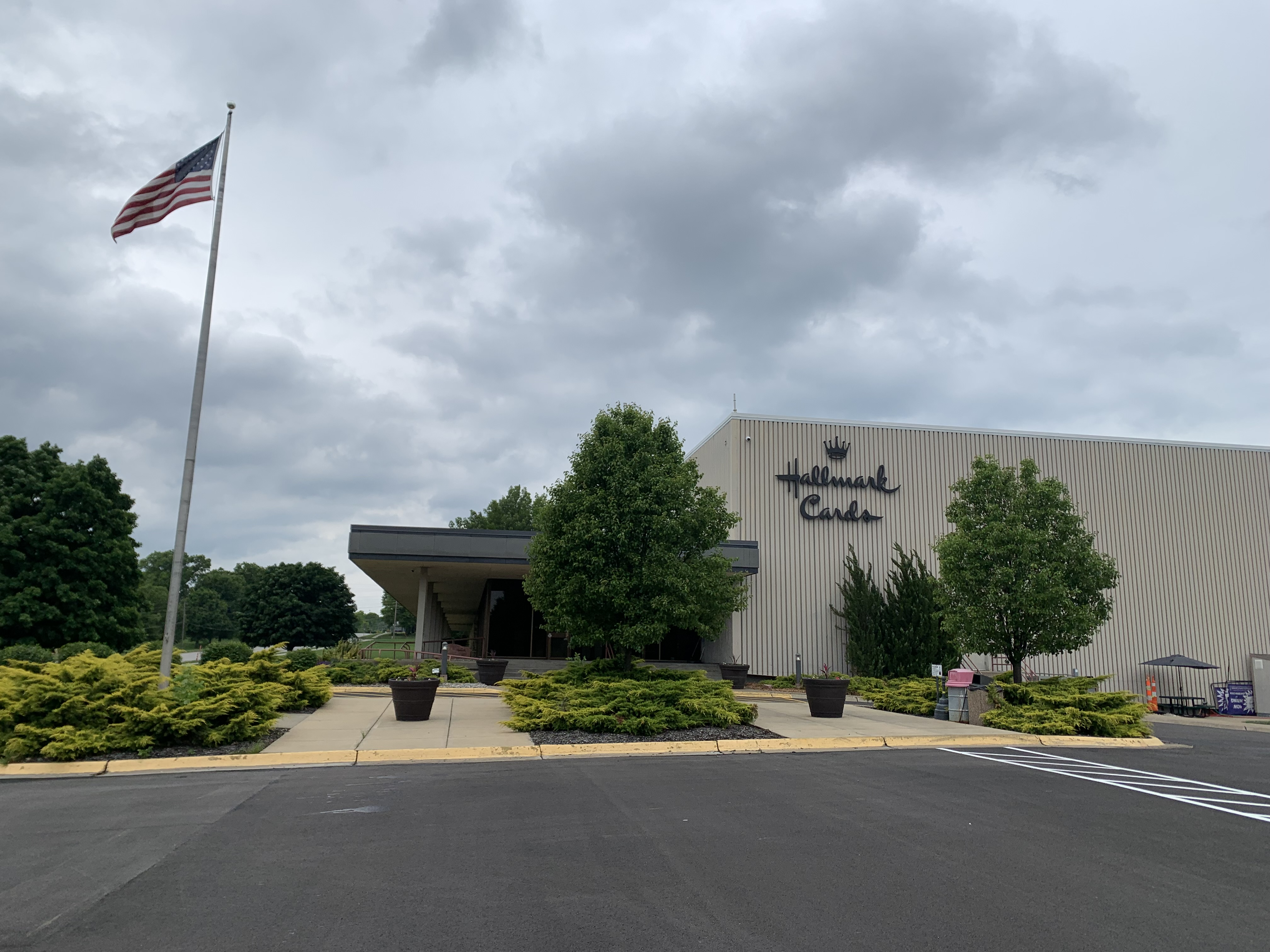
Hallmark Cards factory in Leavenworth

According to the town's 2015 Comprehensive Annual Financial Report, the top employers in the city are:

#	Employer	# of Employees
1	Fort Leavenworth	4,185
2	U.S.D. 453	996
3	Dwight D. Eisenhower Veterans Affairs Medical Center	700
4	Northrop Grumman	700
5	Central Plains Consolidated Accounts	400
6	Cubic Defense Applications Group	390
7	Leavenworth Federal Penitentiary	380
8	Leavenworth County	352
9	Walmart Supercenter	350
10	Hallmark Cards, Inc	260

== Arts and culture ==
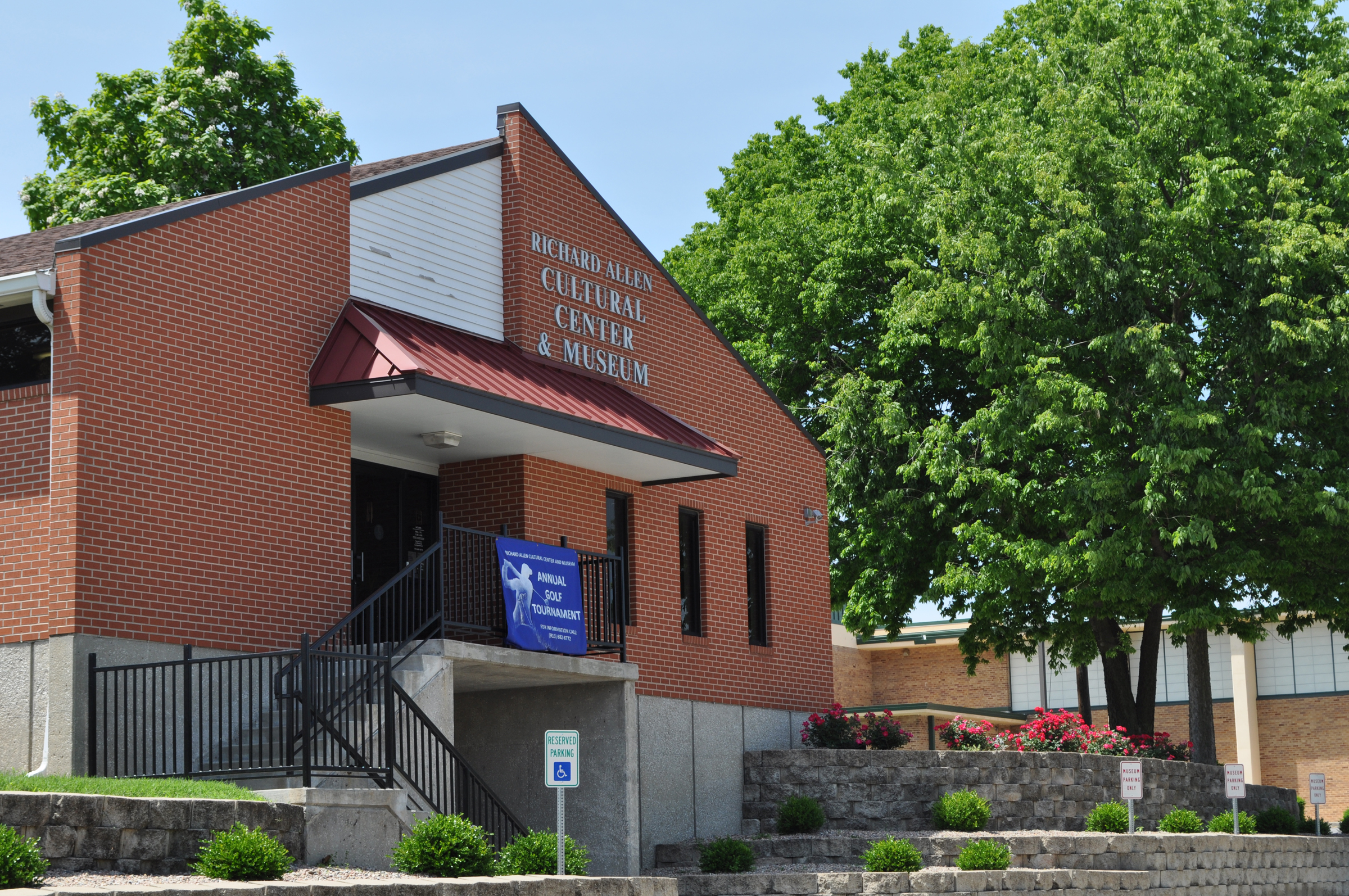
The Richard Allen Cultural Center in Leavenworth is a museum that includes the home of a former black U.S. Army soldier. The museum shares the histories of African Americans living on the Kansas frontier during pioneer days to the present, especially those serving in the U.S. Army.

=== Museums ===
The C.W. Parker Carousel Museum is listed as one of the "8 Wonders of Kansas Customs" by the Kansas Sampler Foundation.

The Fred Harvey Museum, owned and operated by the Leavenworth Historical Museum Association, offers insights into the Harvey family and information about the chain of Harvey Houses in the American Southwest. Also owned and operated by Leavenworth Historical Museum Association, First City Museum tells the rich history of Leavenworth. Displays include famous citizens, businesses, Indian tribes, the prison industry, the military, large collection of horse-drawn vehicles and a 17th-century dugout canoe.

The Leavenworth County Historical Society maintains a museum at the Edward Carroll House, a Victorian-era mansion that is open to the public for touring.

The Richard Allen Cultural Center and Museum contains items and artifacts from African-American pioneers and members of the military, including the "Black Dignity" collection of 1870s-1920s photographs from the Mary Everhard Collection.

=== Events ===
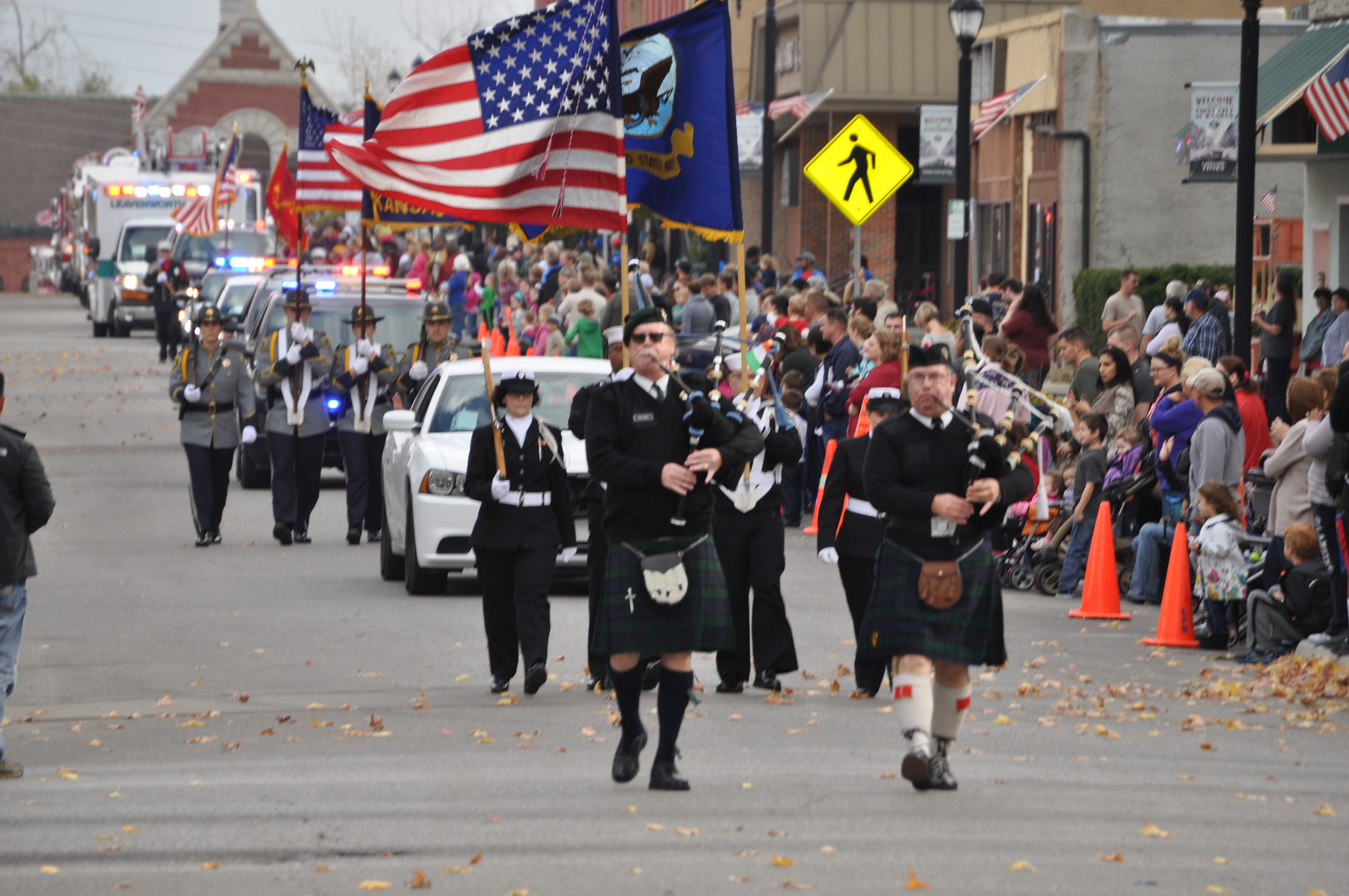
Leavenworth County Veterans Day Parade takes place every year in downtown Leavenworth

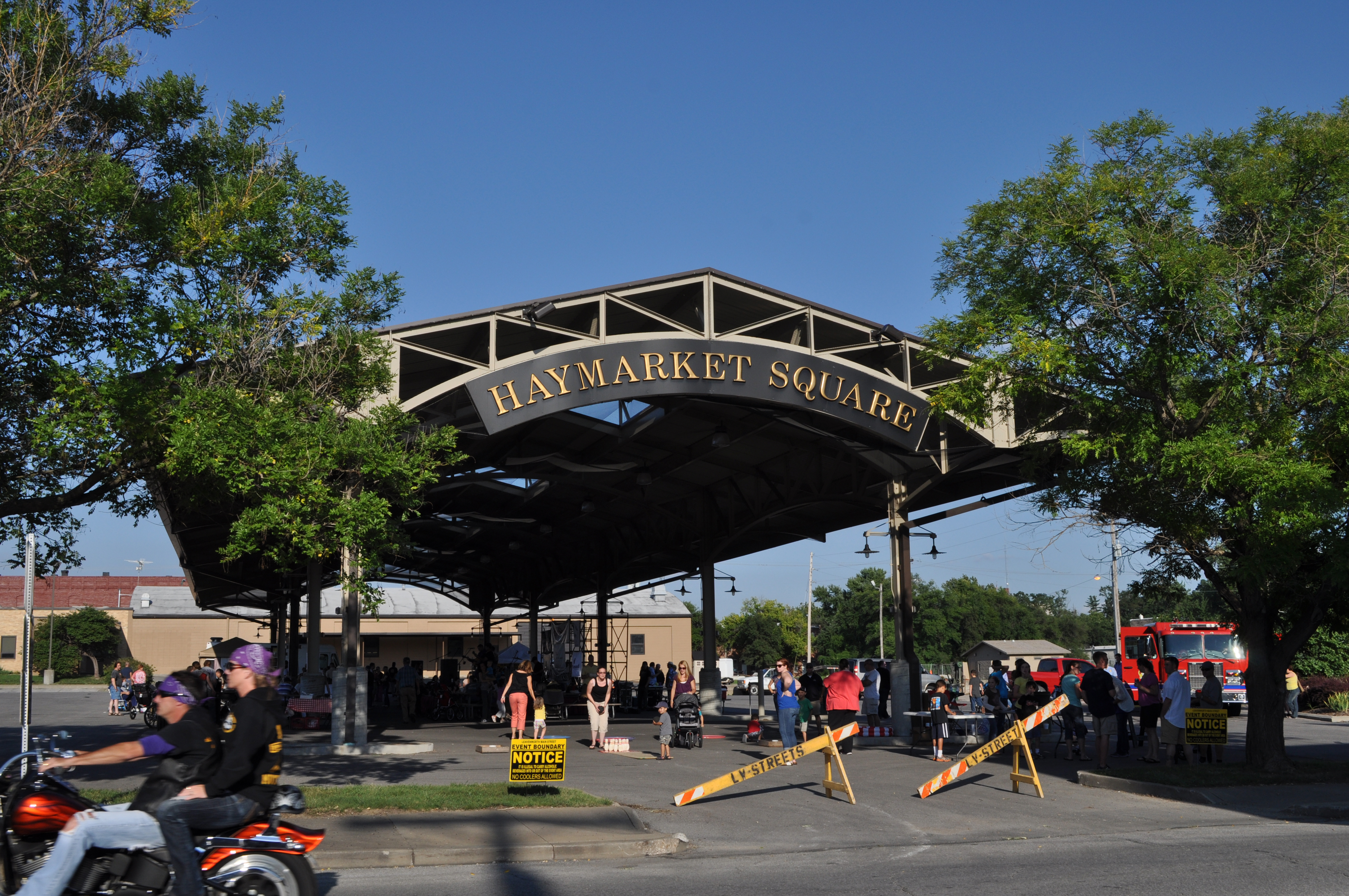
Haymarket Square (2013)

Leavenworth enjoys year-round plays and musicals performed by a community theater group, the River City Community Players.

The Annual Saint Patrick's Day Parade is held each year since 1984 on March 17 at 12 noon in downtown Leavenworth. The day begins with a 9:00 a.m. Roman Catholic Mass at the Church of the Immaculate Conception, "The Old Cathedral": ancestral home of the Irish of Leavenworth. Various fraternal and civic clubs and restaurants host events; monies raised above Parade costs are donated to local charities.

=== Military ===
A parade is held each year on Veterans' Day in downtown Leavenworth to honor veterans. Leavenworth has an active Byron H. Mehl American Legion Post #23 and Veterans of Foreign Wars George Edward White Post 56. Leavenworth High School boasts the very first Junior Reserve Officer Training Corps in the country.

=== Points of interest ===
Leavenworth has a 28-block historic shopping district, which includes antique shops, restaurants, a brewery and a variety of artisan gift shops.

Haymarket Square is a covered lot where a local farmer's market takes place from May to October.

== Parks and recreation ==
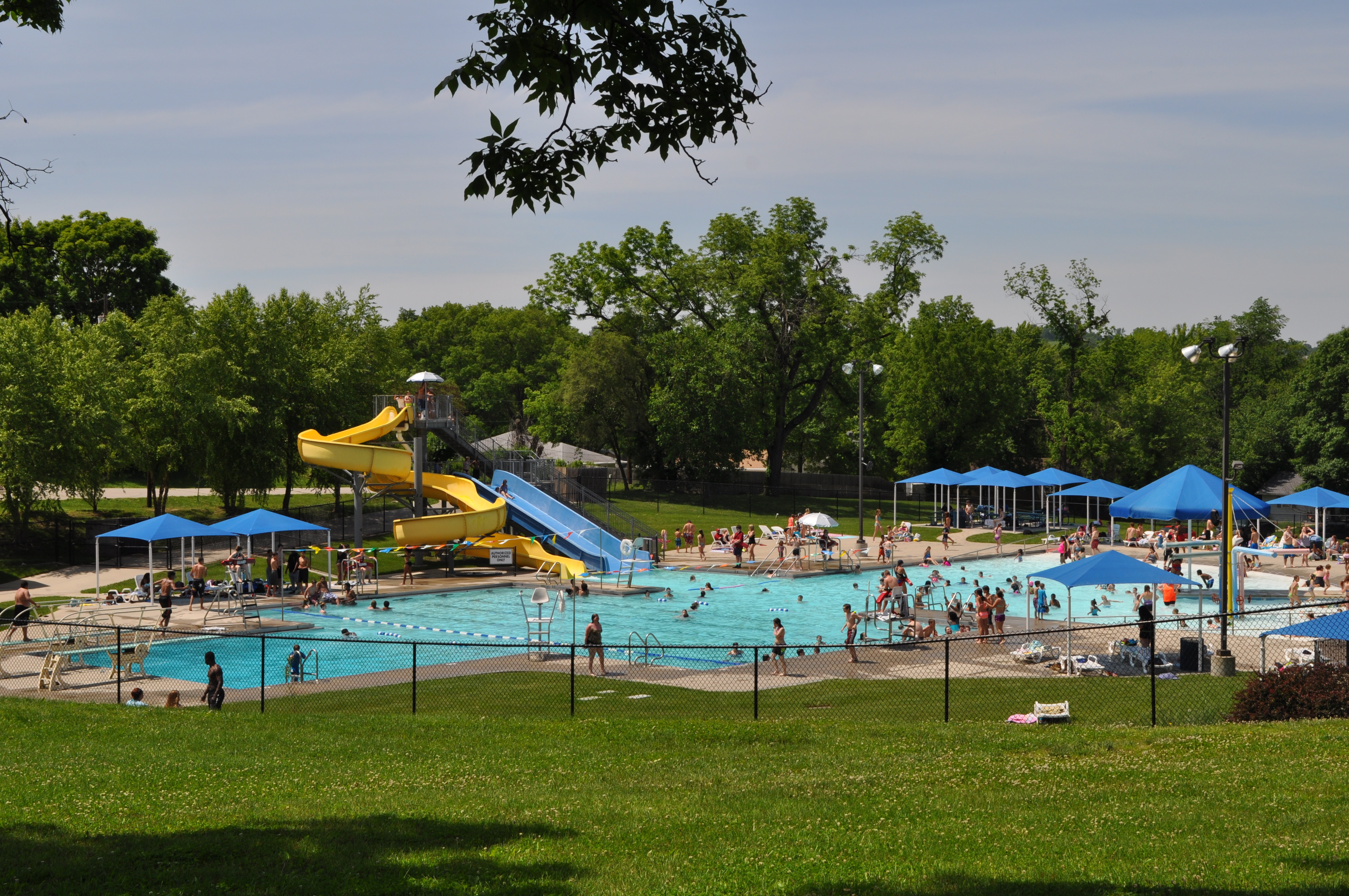
Wollman Aquatic Center at 13th and Shawnee streets in Leavenworth

The Leavenworth Parks and Recreation Department maintains a system of more than 25 public parks as well as Riverfront Community Center, which includes an indoor cardio room and pool, and Wollman Aquatic Center. An off-leash dog park near the Dwight D. Eisenhower Veterans Affairs Medical Center was built with public donations in 2010.

== Government ==
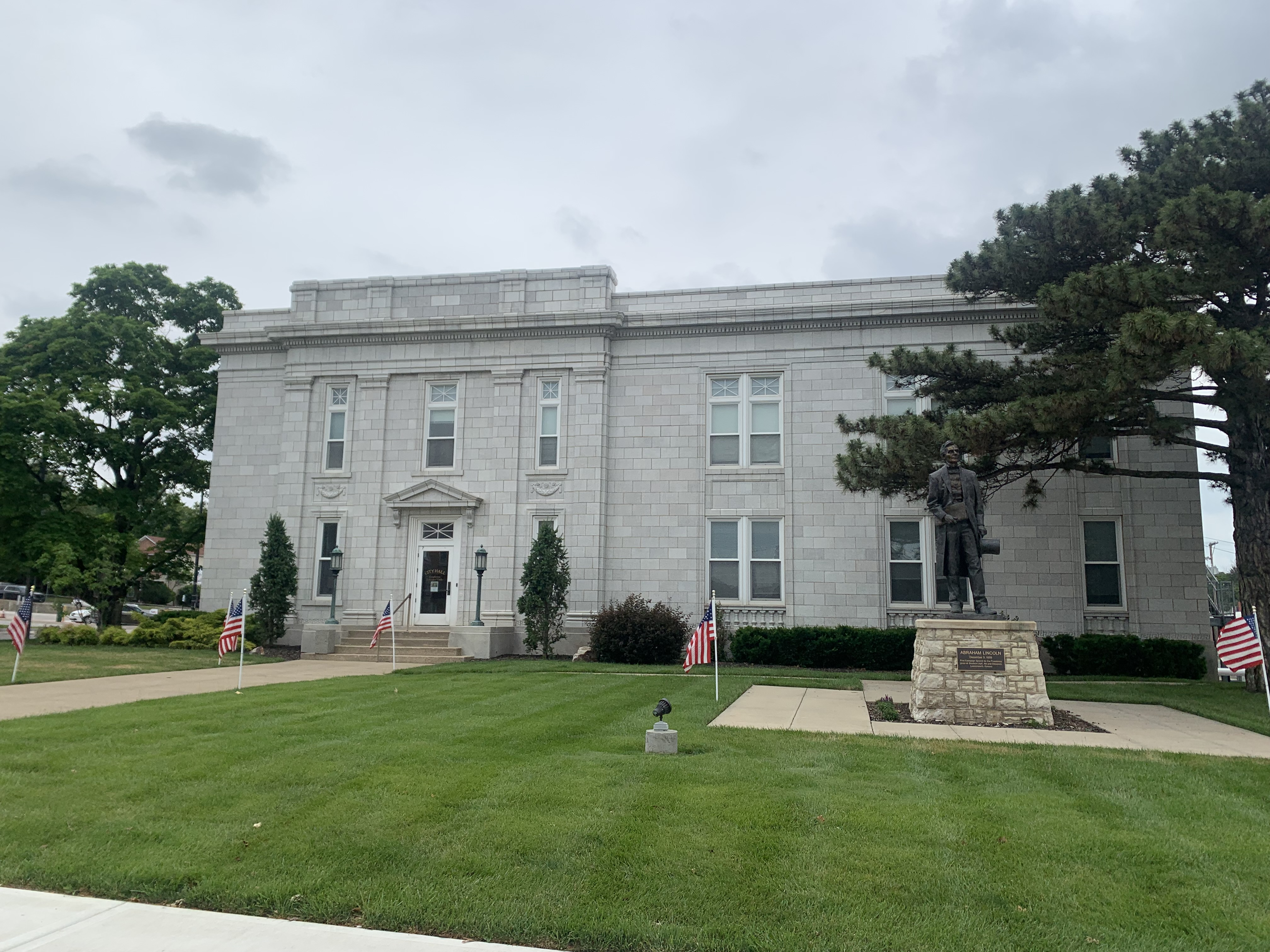
Leavenworth City Hall in downtown Leavenworth

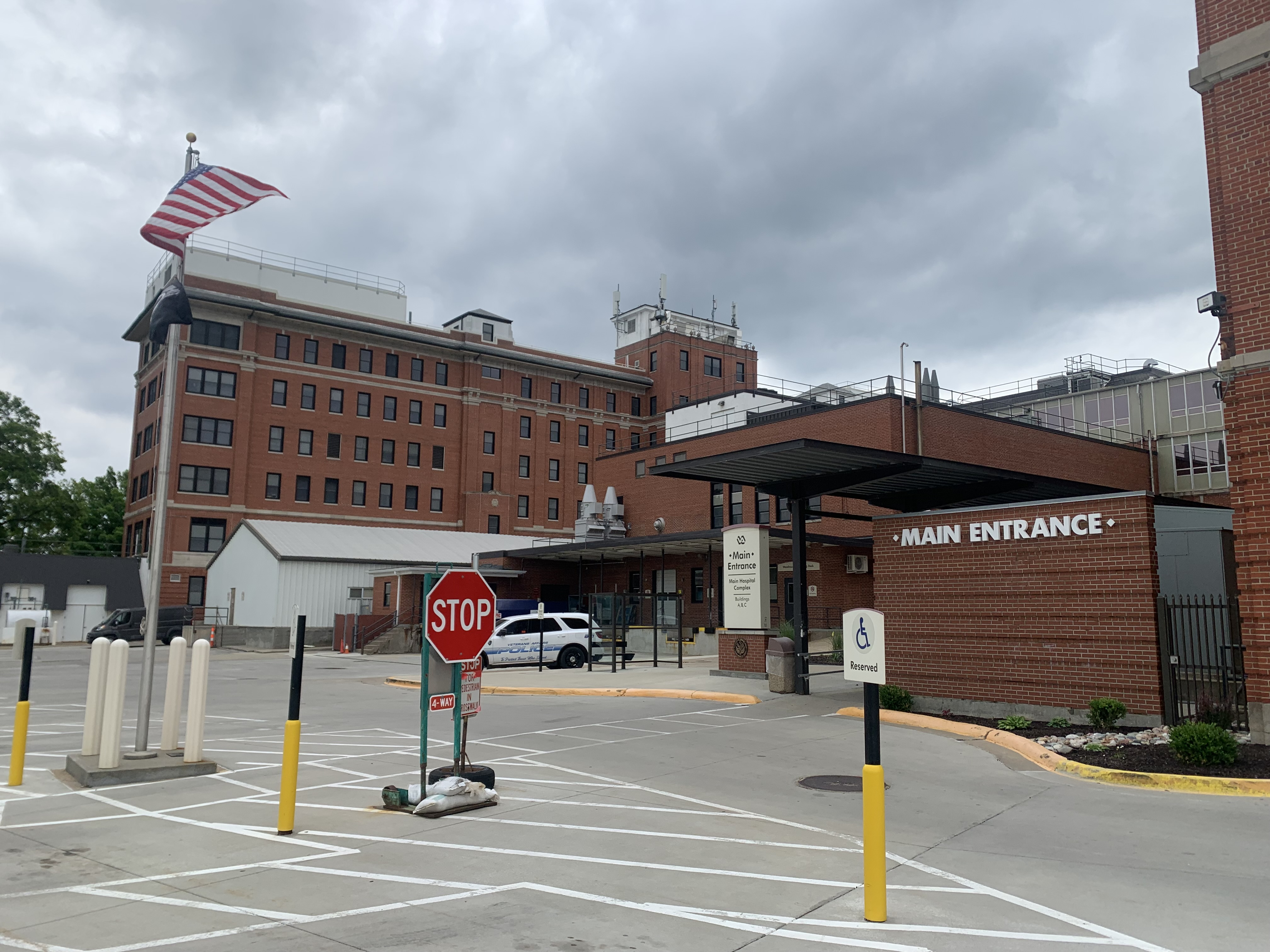
Dwight D. Eisenhower VA Medical Center in Leavenworth

Leavenworth is a city of the first class with a commission-manager form of government. The city commission is the city's governing body and consists of five members, including the mayor and the mayor pro-tem. It sets city policies, adopts the city government's annual operating budget, and appoints city boards, commissions, and officials, including the city manager. Commissioners are elected to either four-year or two-year terms; one is appointed to serve as mayor, and another to serve as mayor pro-tem. The commission meets on the second and fourth Tuesday of each month. The city manager is the city's chief executive, responsible for the day-to-day administration of the city government. The manager supervises all city government departments and employees, prepares and proposes the annual operating budget, and recommends policies to the city commission.

As the county seat, Leavenworth is the administrative center of Leavenworth County. The county courthouse is located south of downtown at 4th and Walnut streets, and all departments of the county government base their operations in the city.

Leavenworth lies within Kansas's 2nd U.S. Congressional District. For the purposes of representation in the Kansas Legislature, the city is in the 5th district of the Kansas Senate and the 40th, 41st, and 42nd districts of the Kansas House of Representatives.

The United States Department of Veterans Affairs operates the Dwight D. Eisenhower Veterans Affairs Medical Center in Leavenworth as part of its Eastern Kansas Health Care System. The Medical Center includes a Consolidated Mail Outpatient Pharmacy (CMOP), part of an initiative to provide mail-order prescriptions to veterans using automated systems at strategic locations throughout the United States, as well as the Central Plains Consolidated Patient Account Center (CPAC), a billing and collection agency.

=== Fort Leavenworth ===
Fort Leavenworth, known as the "Intellectual Center of the Army", is home to the U.S. Army Combined Arms Center. It is also home to the U.S. Army Command and General Staff College, School of Advanced Military Studies, the Center for Army Leadership, the Combat Studies Institute, the Combined Arms Doctrine Directorate, the Center for Army Lessons Learned and the Mission Command Center of Excellence.

=== Prisons ===
Leavenworth is the location of several federal and state detention centers and prisons:

- United States Penitentiary, Leavenworth (USP) constructed in 1903, and its satellite prison camp, operated by the Federal Bureau of Prisons
- United States Disciplinary Barracks, the U.S. military's only maximum-security facility
- Midwest Joint Regional Correctional Facility, another U.S. military facility
- Leavenworth Detention Center, operator by for-profit prison corporation, CoreCivic for the United States Marshals Service

== Education ==
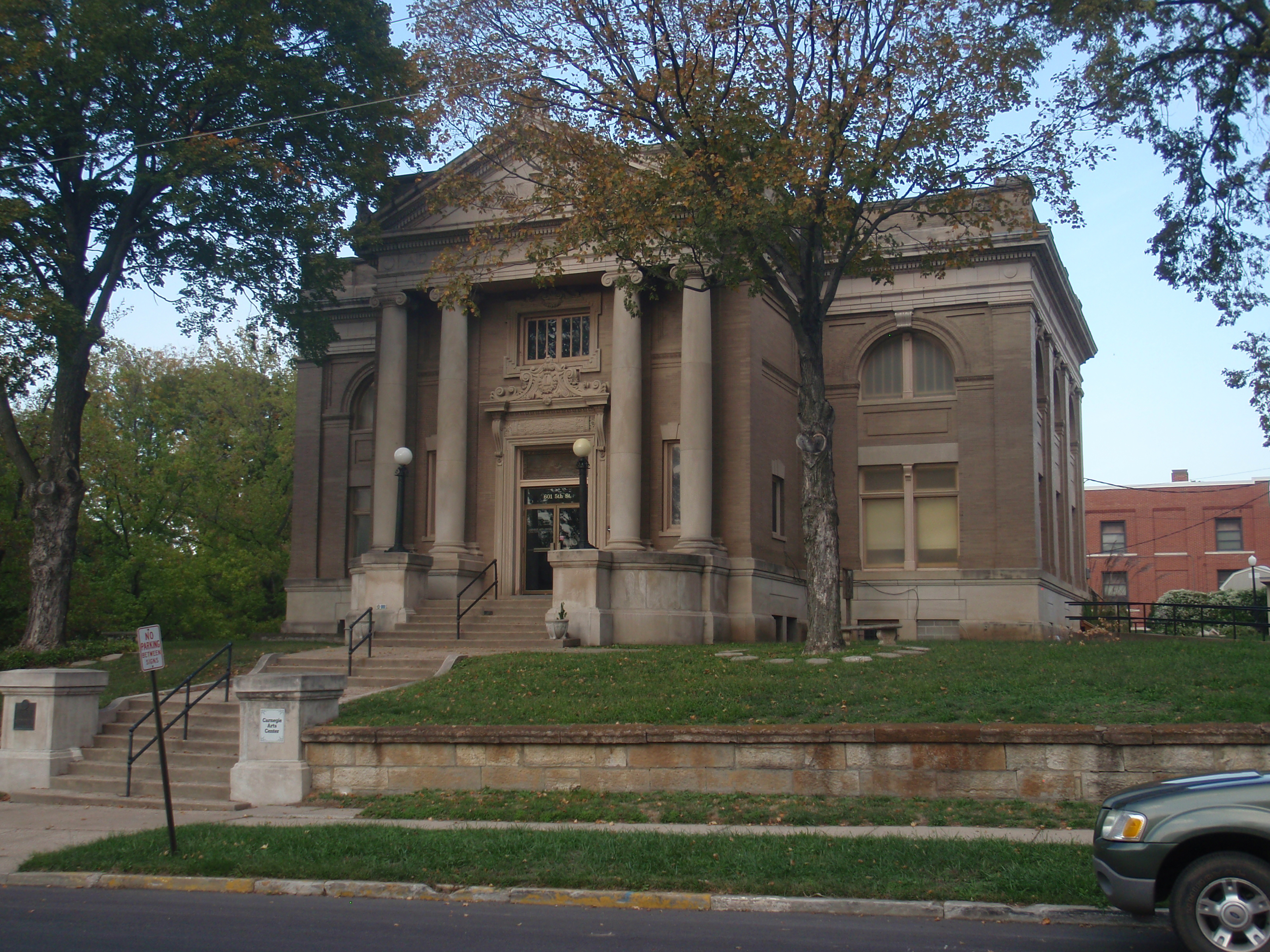
Former Leavenworth Carnegie Library (2012)

=== Primary and secondary education ===
Two public school districts serve the city. The majority of the city lies within Leavenworth USD 453, which operates six schools: four elementary schools, one middle school, and Leavenworth High School. USD 453 also operates Leavenworth Virtual School, an Internet-based school for students from grades Kindergarten through eighth grade. Senior high school students from Fort Leavenworth attend Leavenworth High School. 5th and 6th graders attend Richard Warren Middle School, which recently completed construction of a technology extension to the original building. Fort Leavenworth USD 207 encompasses Fort Leavenworth, and operates three elementary schools and one junior high school. A small portion of southern Leavenworth is in Lansing USD 469. Residents of this district are zoned to Lansing High School.

There are also two private schools in Leavenworth, and formerly there was a private high school. The Roman Catholic Archdiocese of Kansas City in Kansas oversees one Catholic school, Xavier Elementary School (Grades Pre-K-8). Immaculata High School (Kansas) closed at the end of the 2016–2017 school year. The Lutheran Church–Missouri Synod operates one Lutheran school, St. Paul Lutheran School (Pre-K-8).

=== Colleges and universities ===
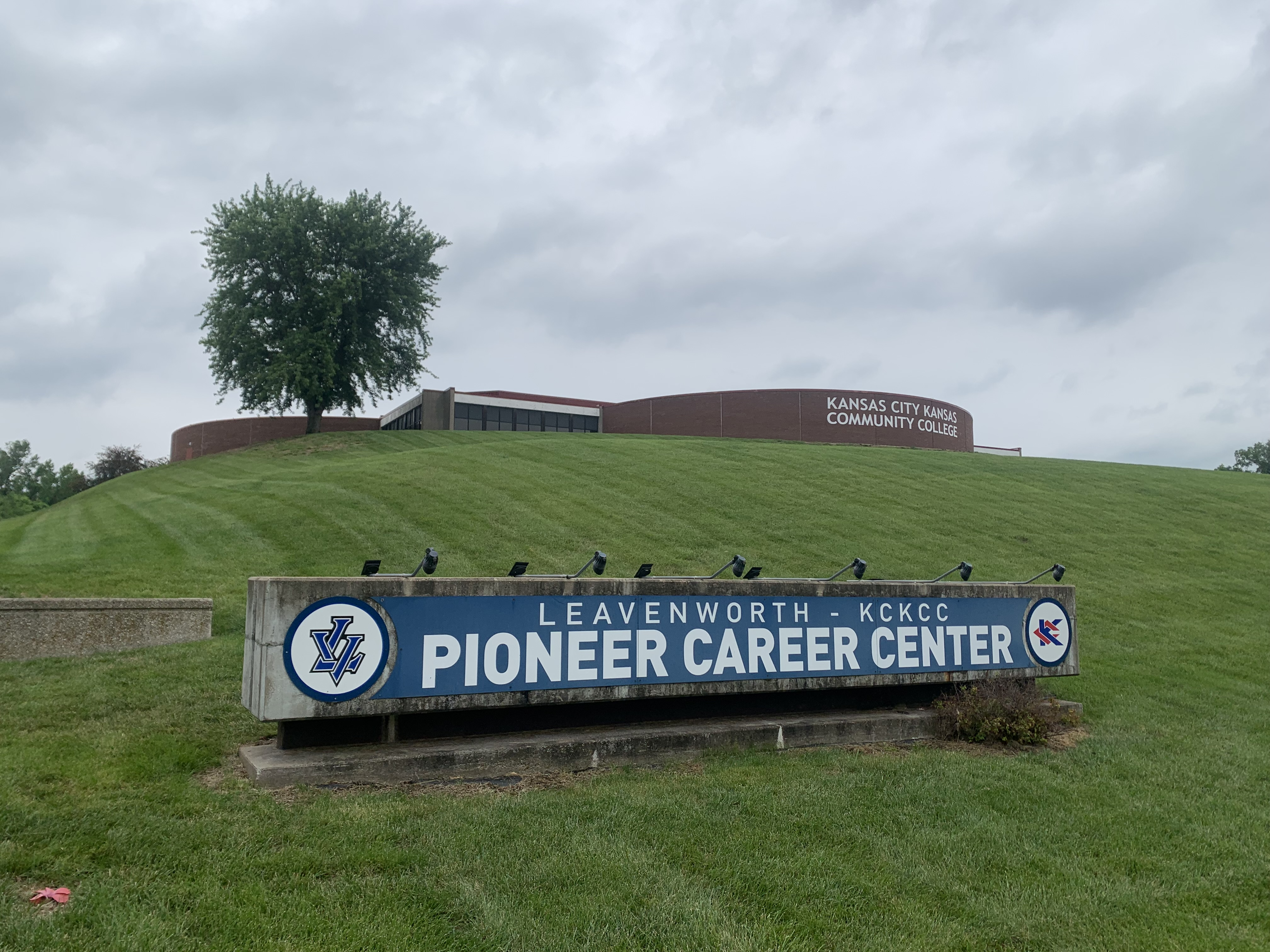
Pioneer Career Center of Kansas City Kansas Community College in Leavenworth

The main campus of University of Saint Mary, a four-year, private Catholic university, is in Leavenworth. In addition, Kansas City Kansas Community College operates a satellite campus in the city.

== Media ==
The Leavenworth Times, published by CherryRoad Media is the city's daily newspaper. CherryRoad Media also publishes The Fort Leavenworth Lamp, a weekly newspaper covering local military news, on contract with the U.S. Army.

Leavenworth is in the Kansas City radio and television markets. Two radio stations are licensed in the city: KKLO broadcasts from Leavenworth on 1410 AM, a Fox News affiliate; KQRC-FM broadcasts from Mission, Kansas on 98.9 FM, playing a Rock format. The major regional newspaper is the Kansas City Star.

== Transportation ==
In April 2023, RideLV began to provide on-demand transit service within the city using a mobile software app. The service is operated by The Guidance Center in partnership with the Kansas City Area Transportation Authority. However, Leavenworth remains the largest city in Kansas without fixed-route public transit service.

The nearest intercity transit services are located in Kansas City, Missouri. Kansas City Union Station serves Amtrak's Southwest Chief and Missouri River Runner. The Kansas City Bus Station serves Greyhound Lines and Jefferson Lines.

== In popular culture ==
Leavenworth is the setting for "Hurt People", a 2009 novel by Cote Smith.

== Notable people ==
Political activist Charles Henry Langston lived and worked here (1863–1870), assisting African-American refugees from slave states and, after the Civil War, working for black suffrage and equal rights of blacks in the West; he moved to Lawrence for the remainder of his life. General of the Army and 34th President of the United States Dwight D. Eisenhower once served at Fort Leavenworth. Both Buffalo Bill Cody and Wild Bill Hickok lived and worked in Leavenworth during its Old West frontier period.

Other notable individuals who were born in and/or have lived in Leavenworth include rock musician Melissa Etheridge, restaurant entrepreneur Fred Harvey, Broadway producer and Tony Awards founder Brock Pemberton, U.S. Supreme Court justice David Josiah Brewer, author Sanora Babb, and former NBA player, Wayne Anthony Simien.

== Sister cities ==
- Wagga Wagga, New South Wales, Australia
- Ōmihachiman, Japan

== Gallery ==
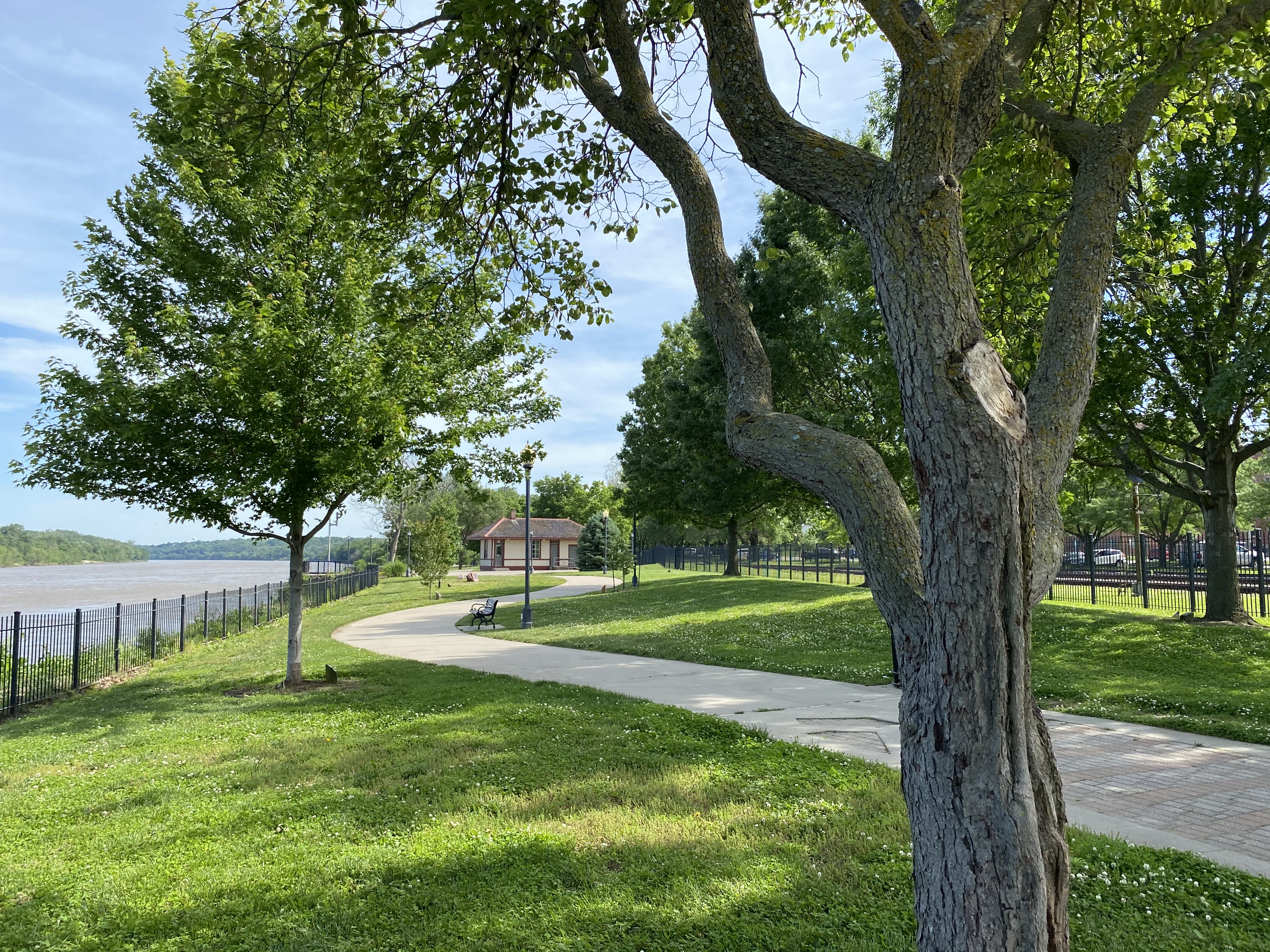
Leavenworth Landing Park along the Missouri River in Leavenworth.

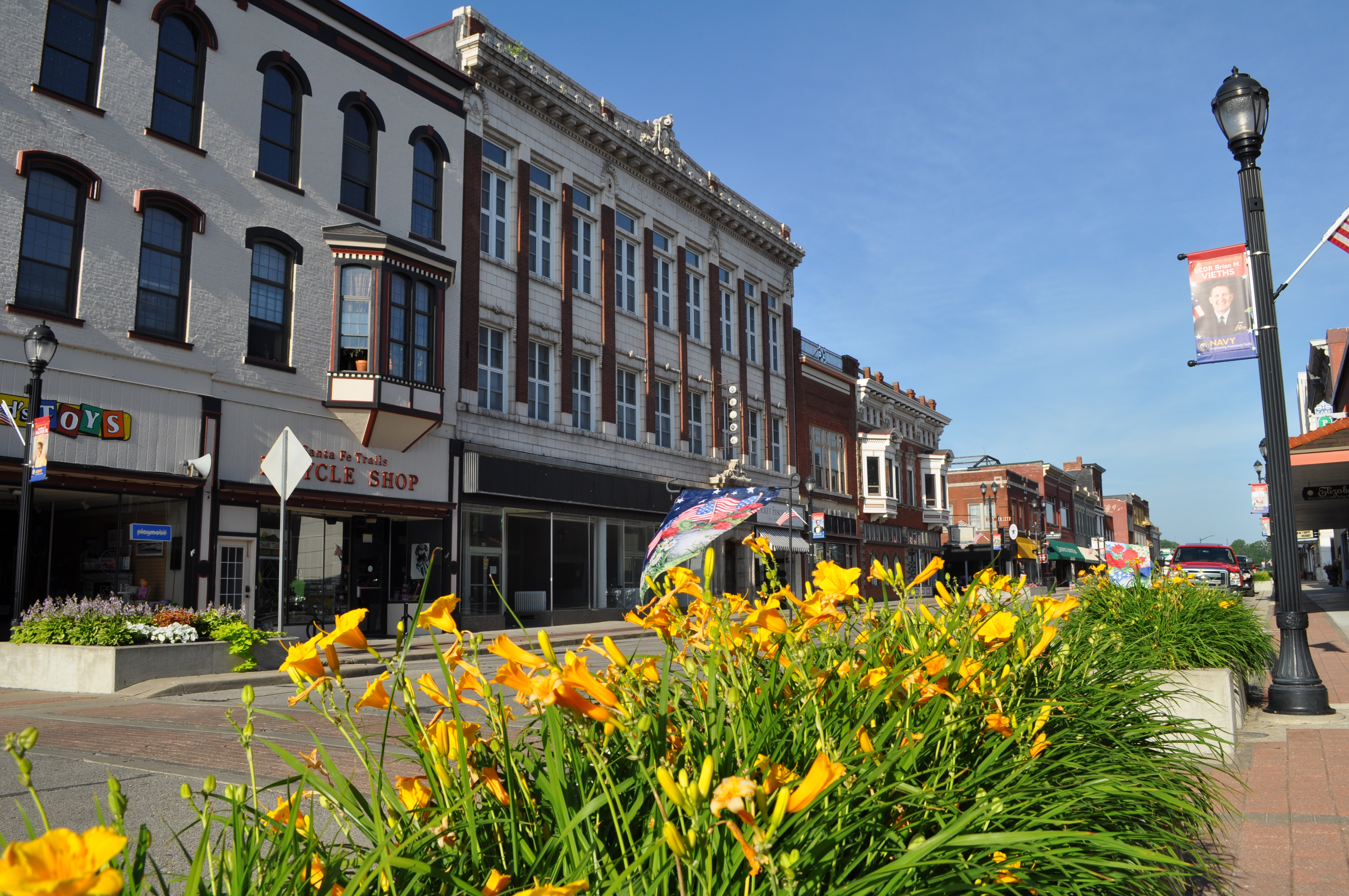
Downtown Leavenworth, Kansas along Delaware Street facing south.

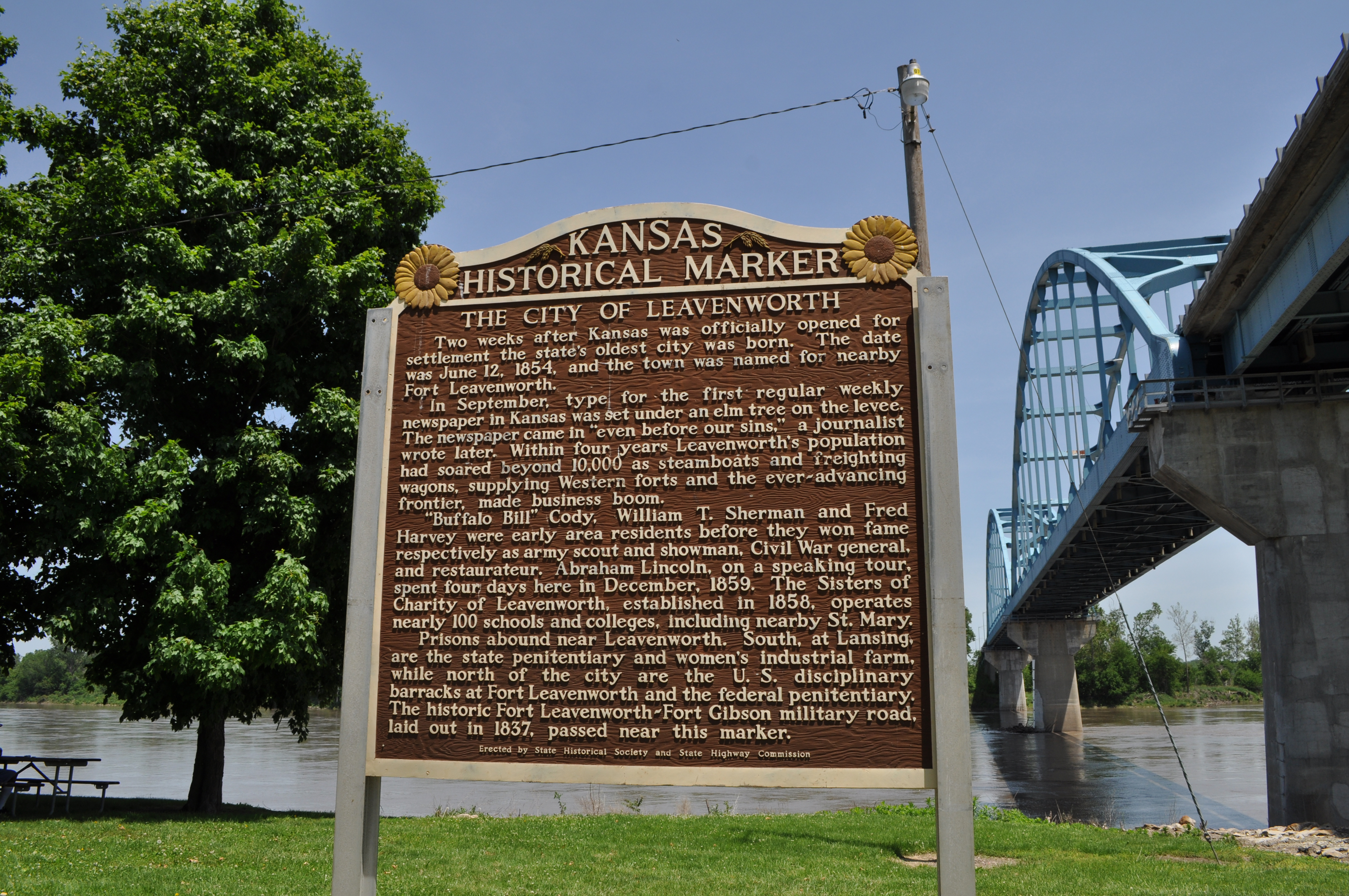
Marker relating the history of Leavenworth.

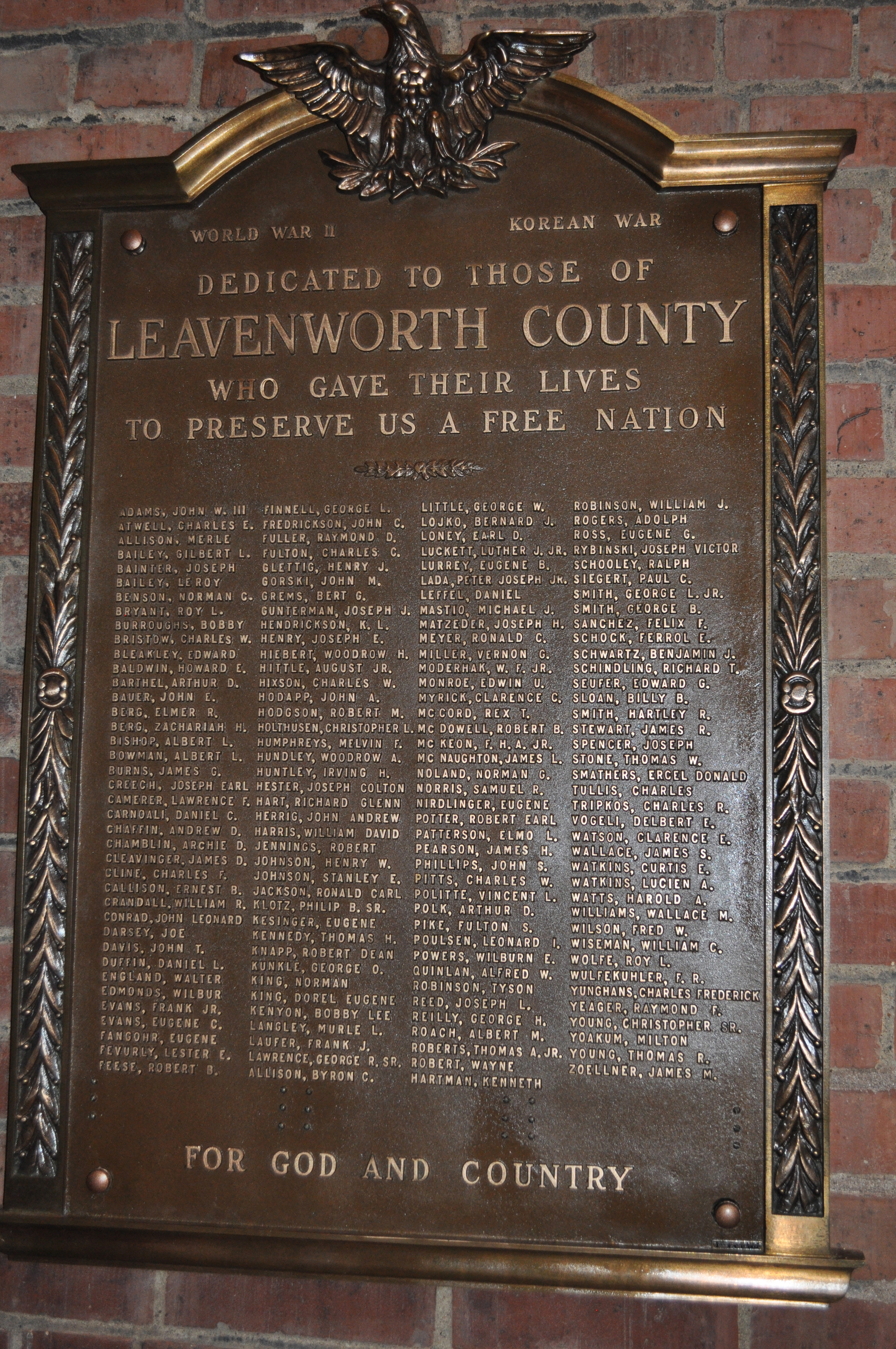
Plaque (2013) memorializing soldiers from Leavenworth County who were killed in action during World War II and Korea.

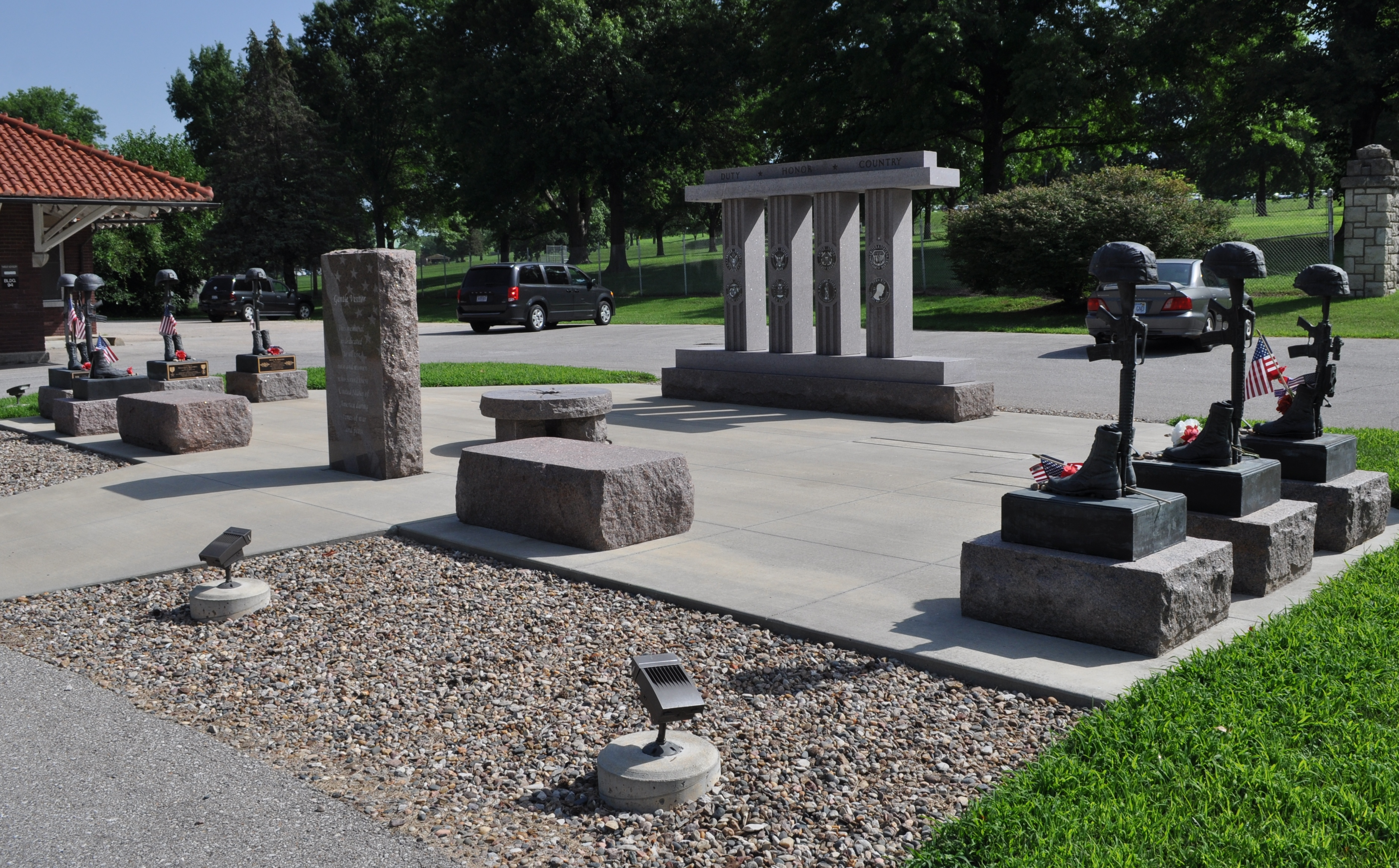
The Leavenworth Veterans Memorial was erected in 2013 to honor and remember service members who died during the Global War on Terror era.

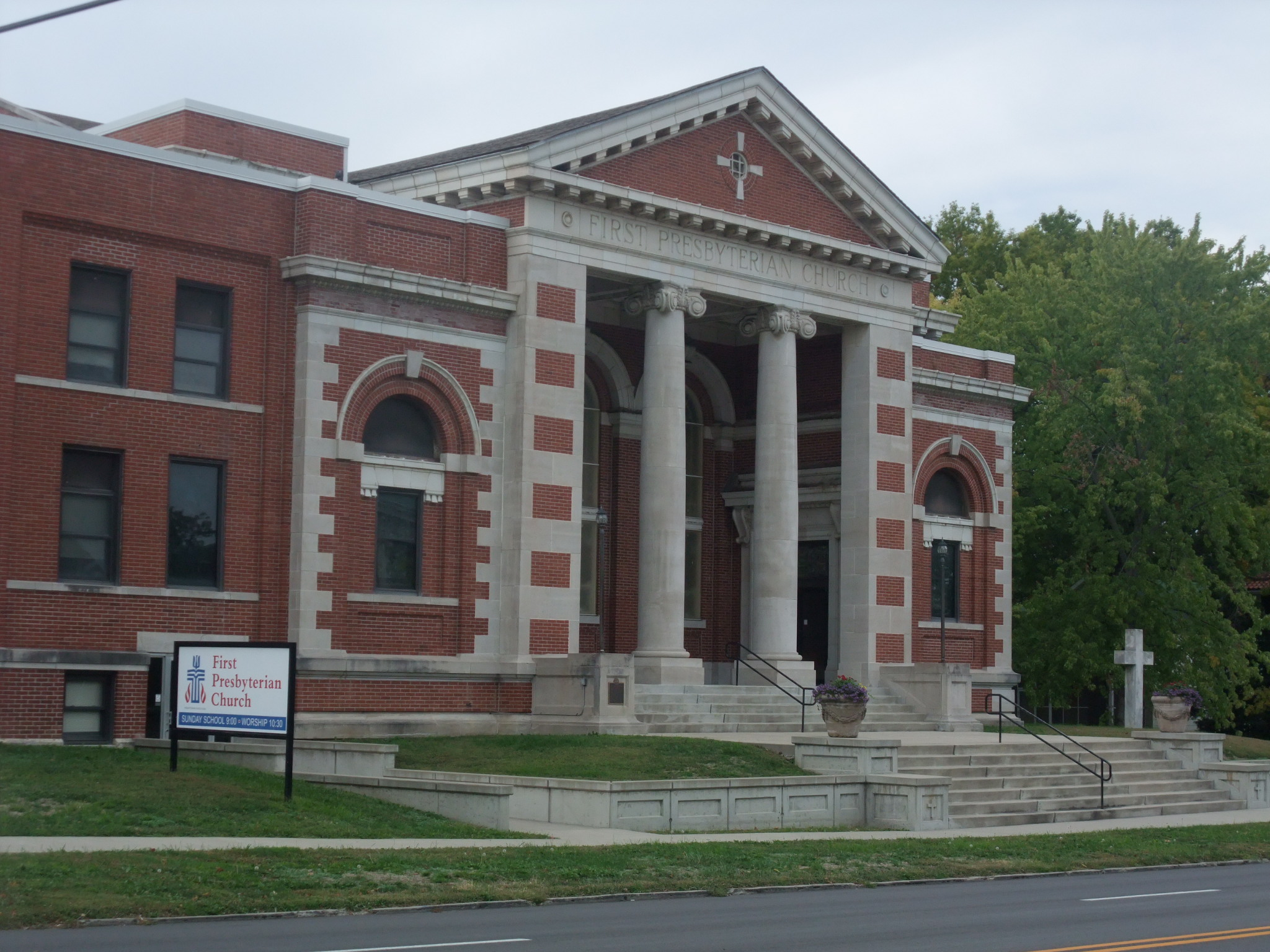
First Presbyterian Church (2012).

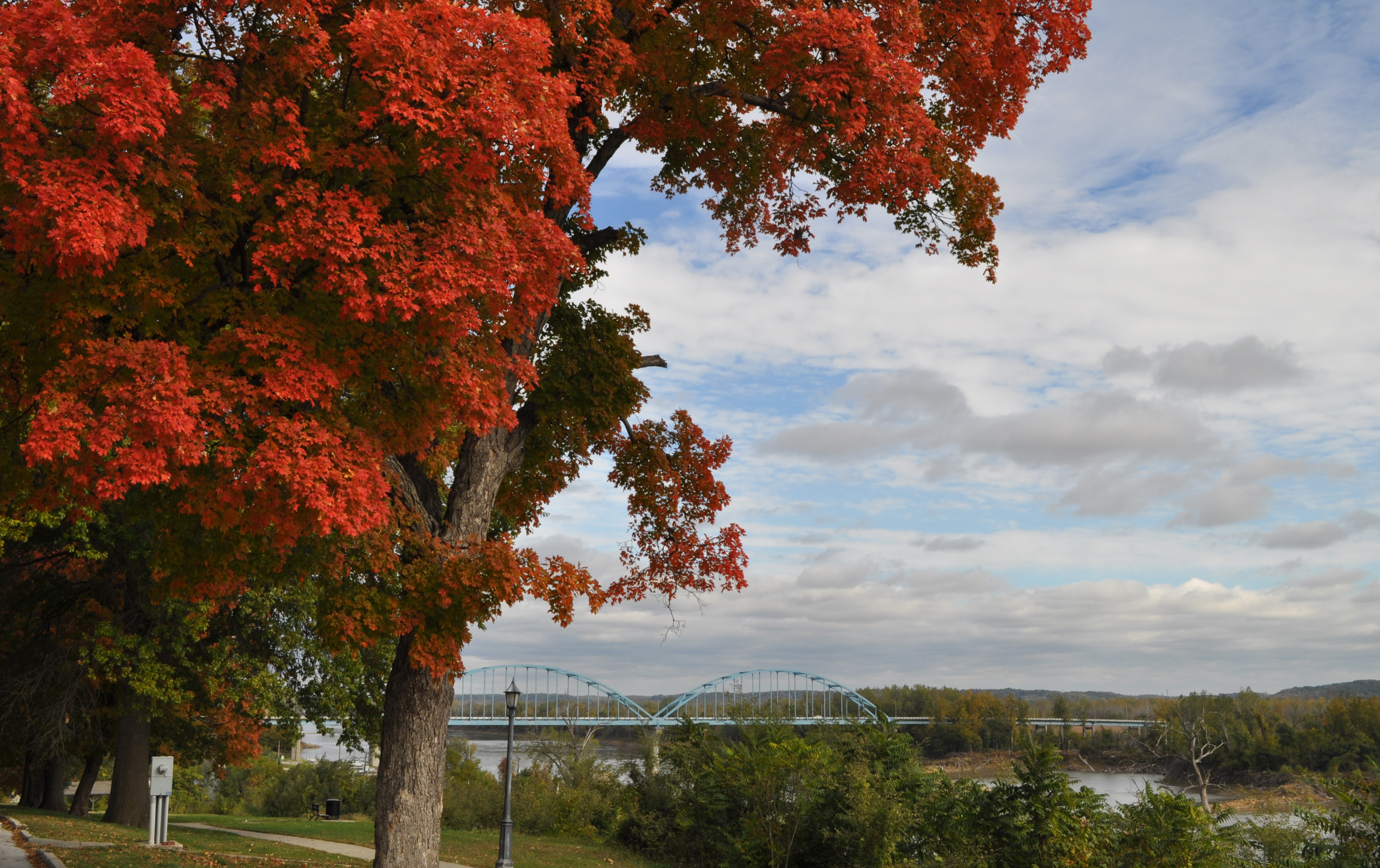
Fall color at North Esplanade Park, the first park founded in the first City of Kansas.

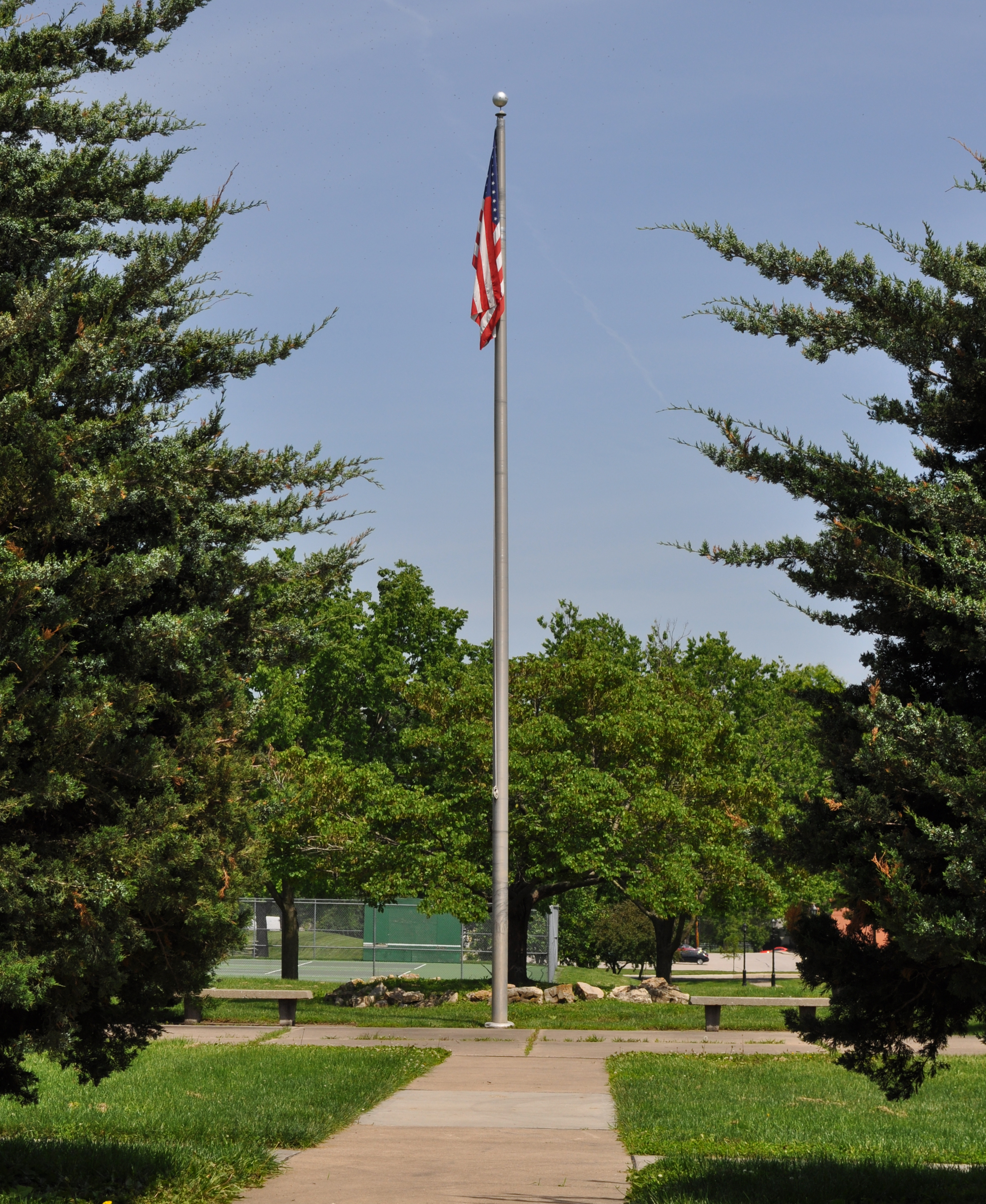
David Brewer Park in Leavenworth, Kansas, named for David Josiah Brewer, former U.S. Supreme Court Justice.

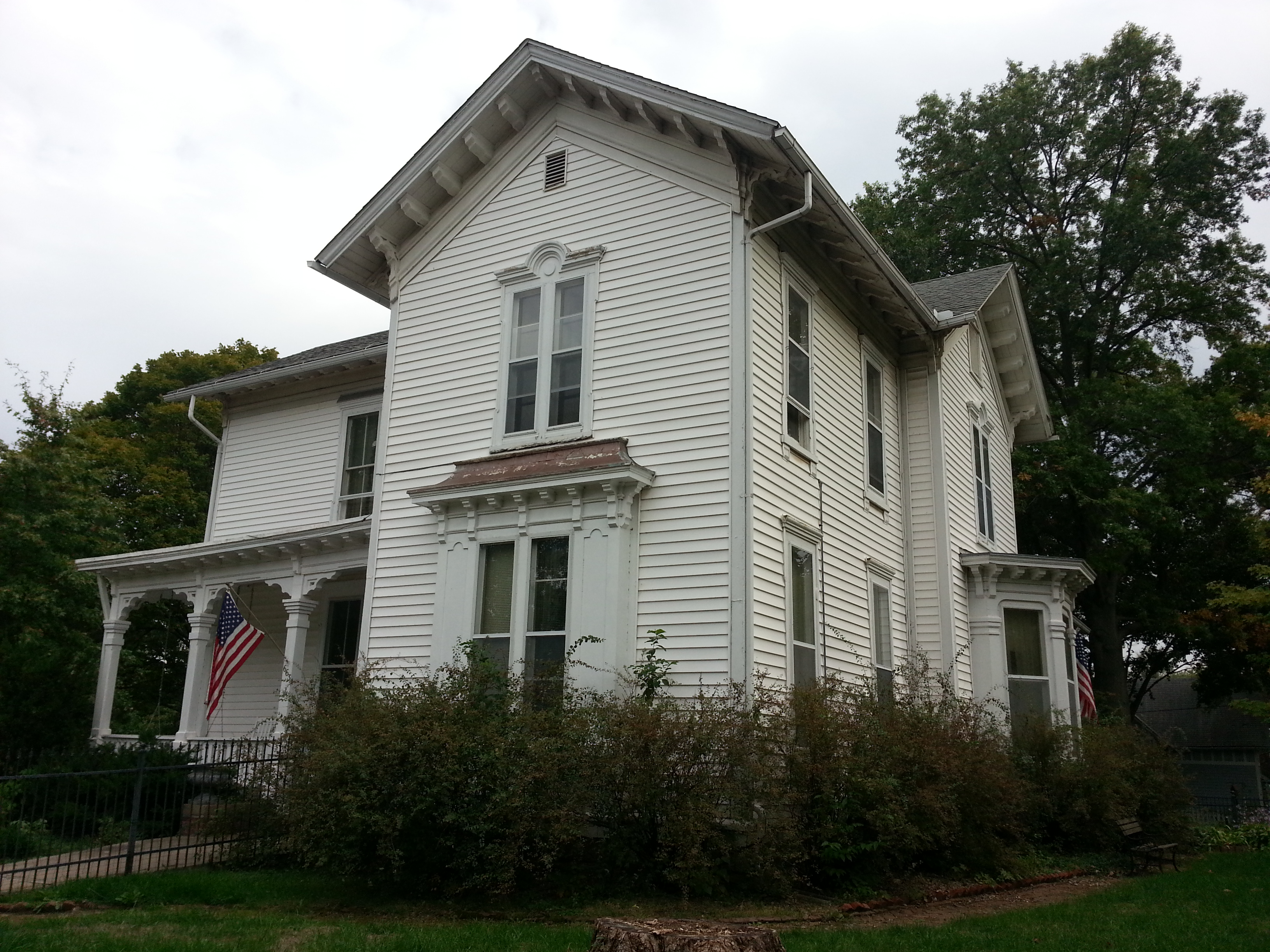
Home of David Josiah Brewer, former U.S. Supreme Court Justice, when he lived in Leavenworth.

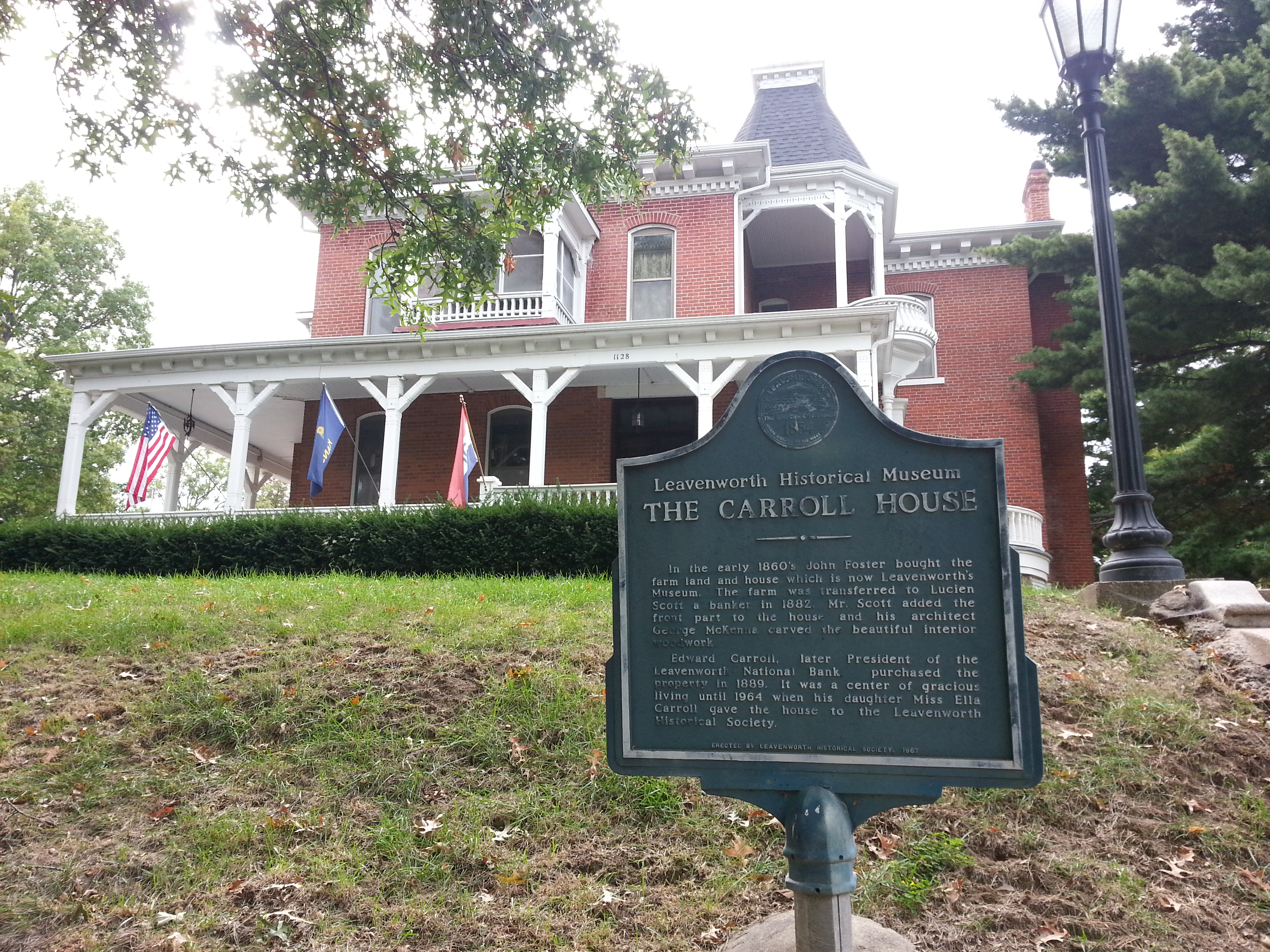
Edward Carroll House, operating since 1965 as a Victorian house museum.

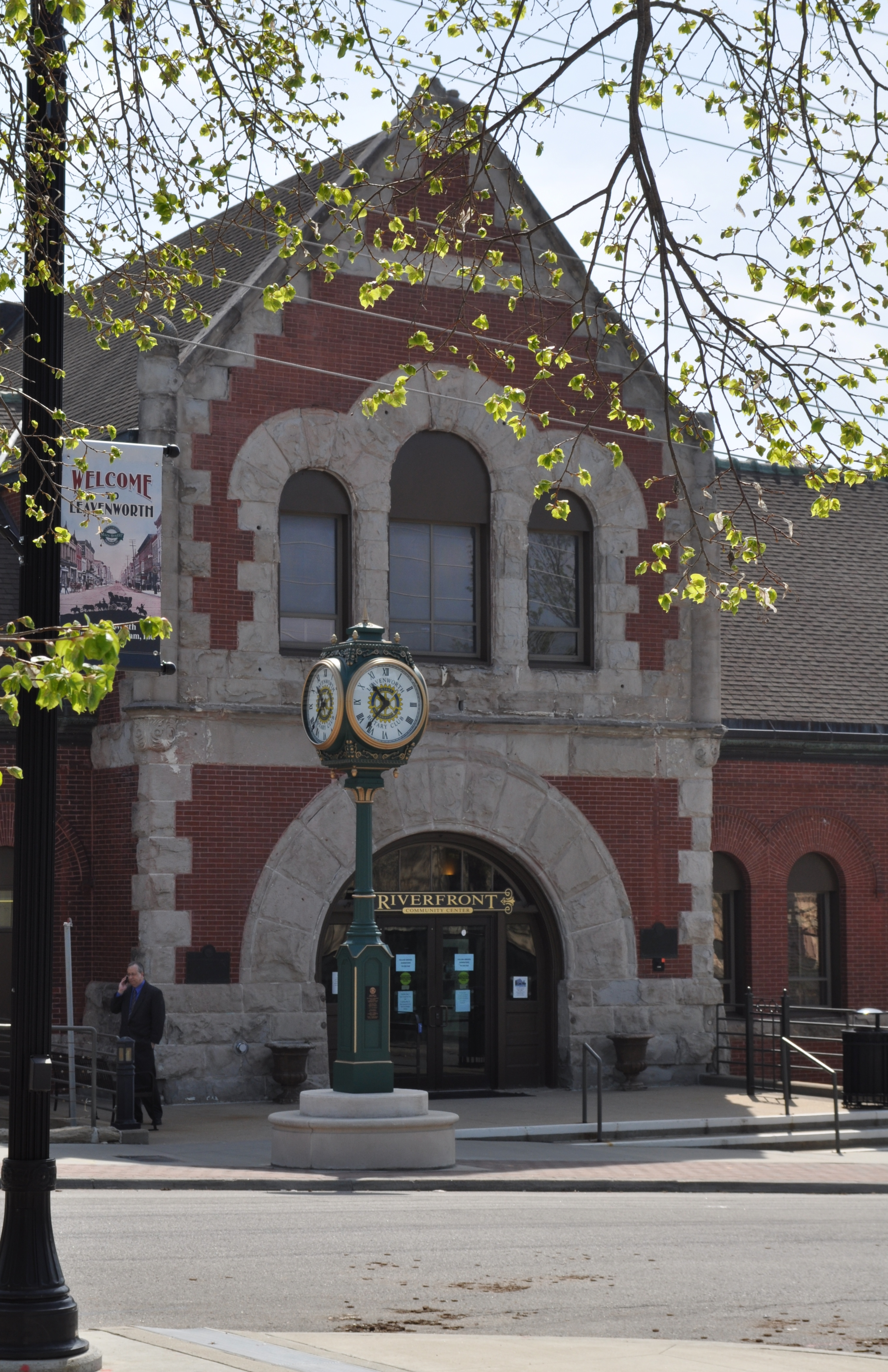
Riverfront Community Center, a former Union Station train depot.

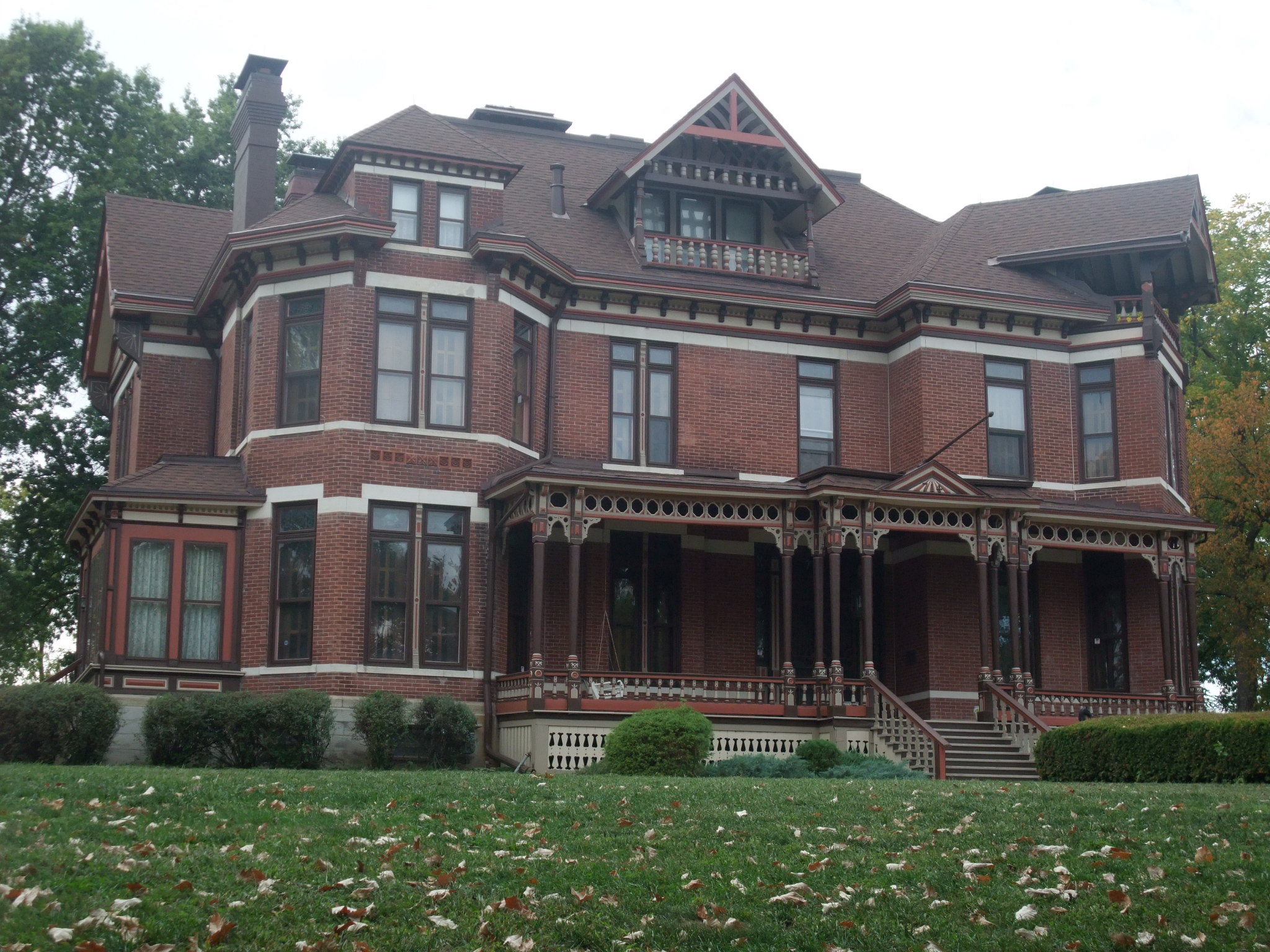
A. J. Angell House.

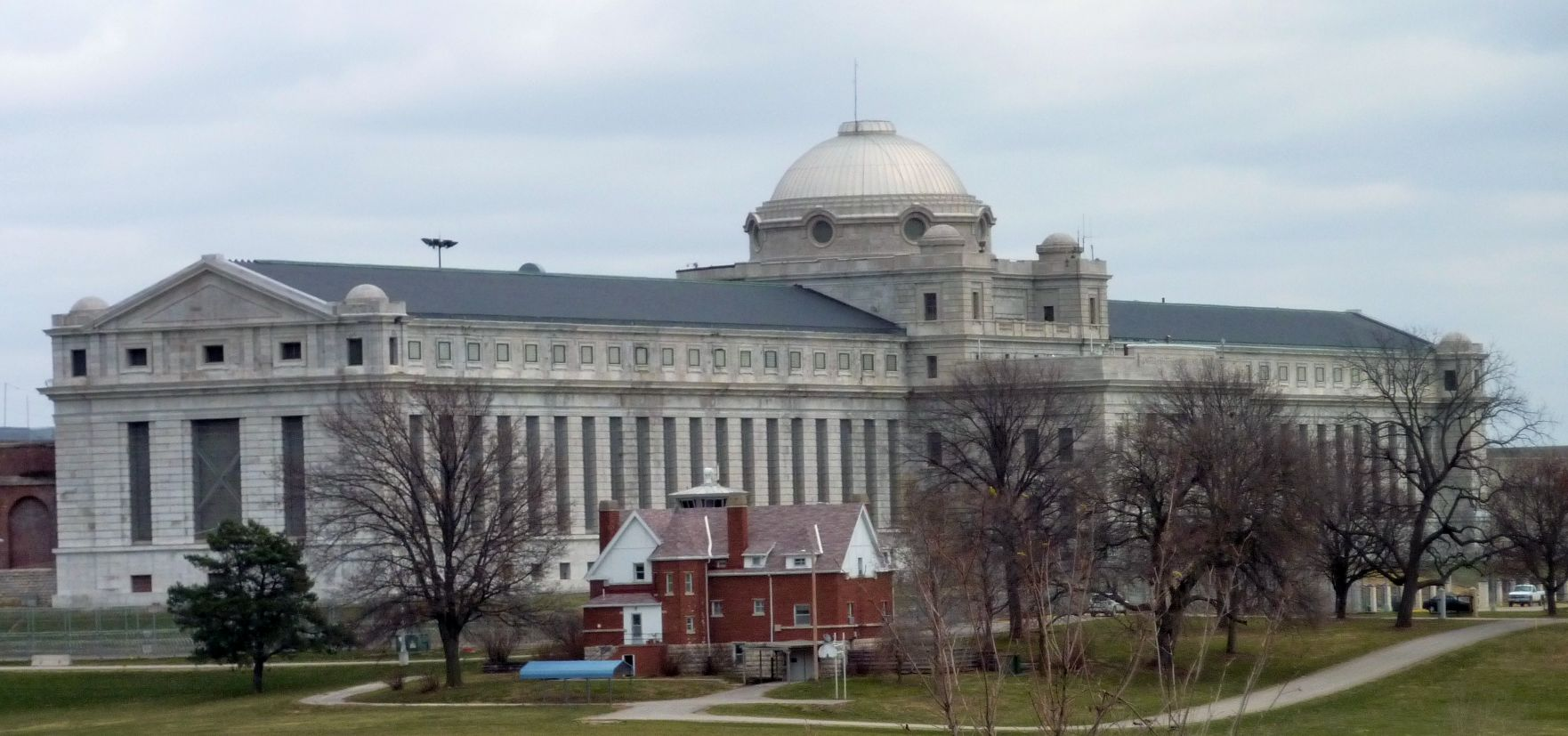
US Penitentiary in Leavenworth.

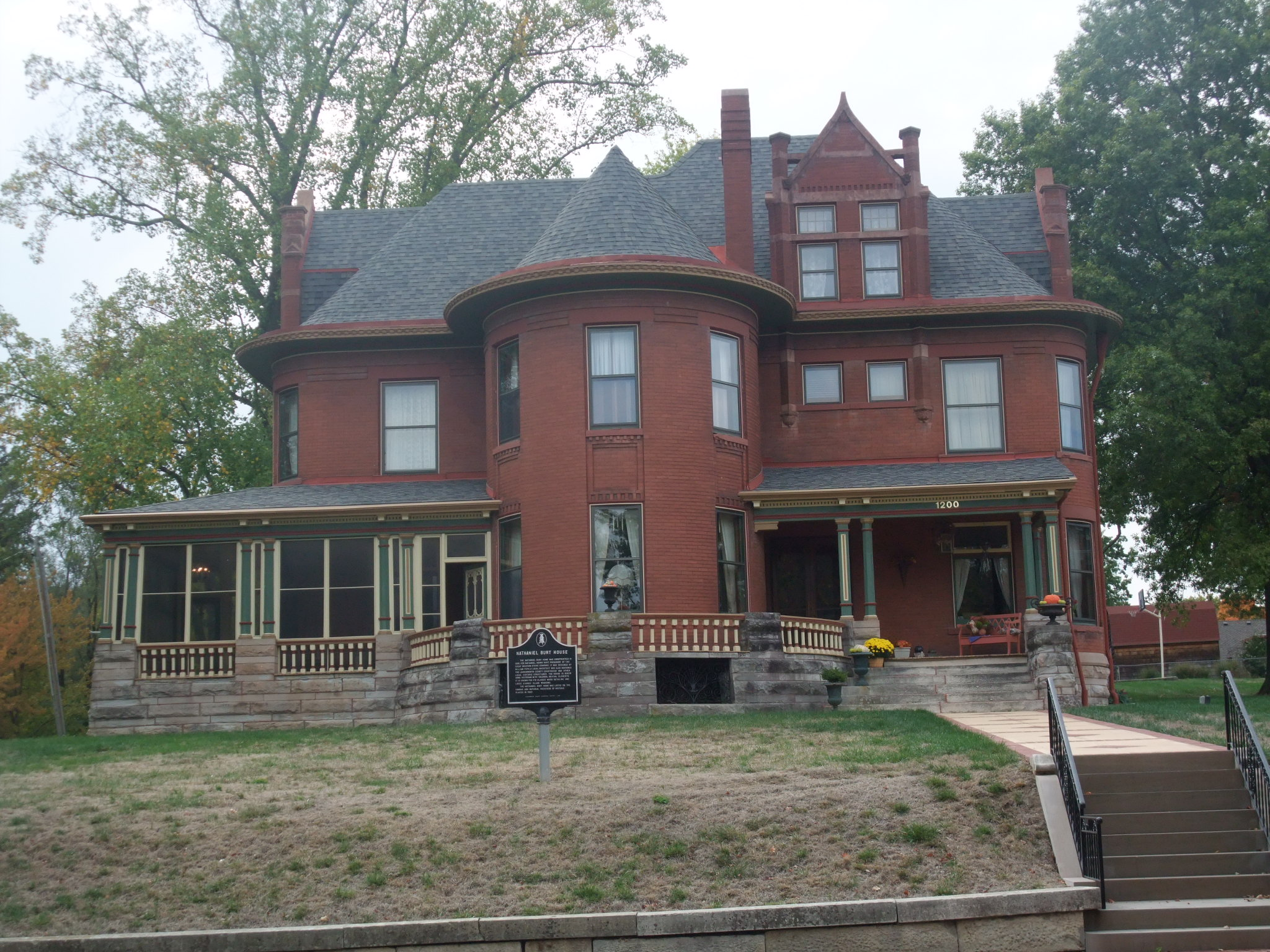
Nathaniel Burt House.

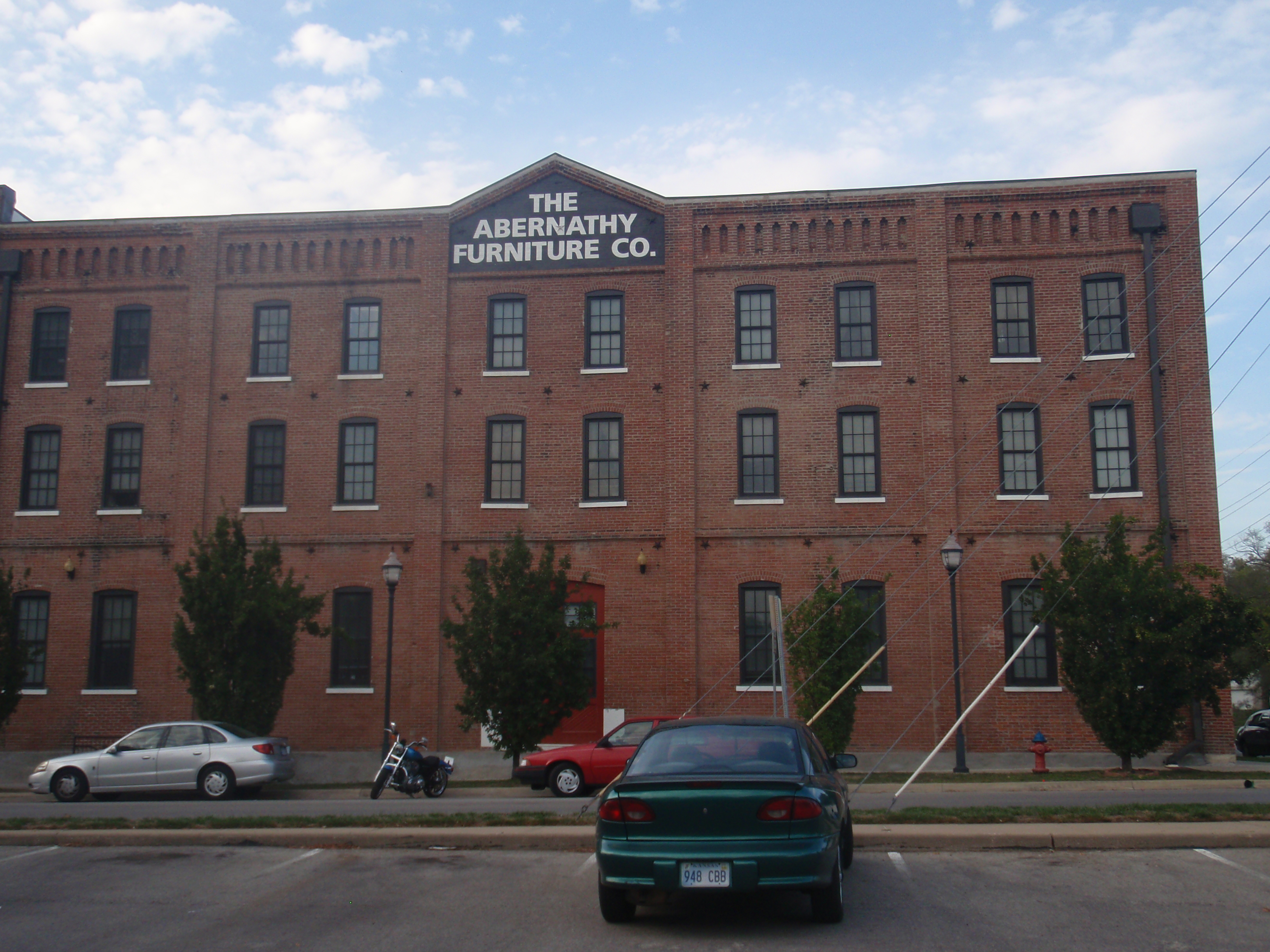
Abernathy Furniture Co. building was converted to lofts in the early 2000s.

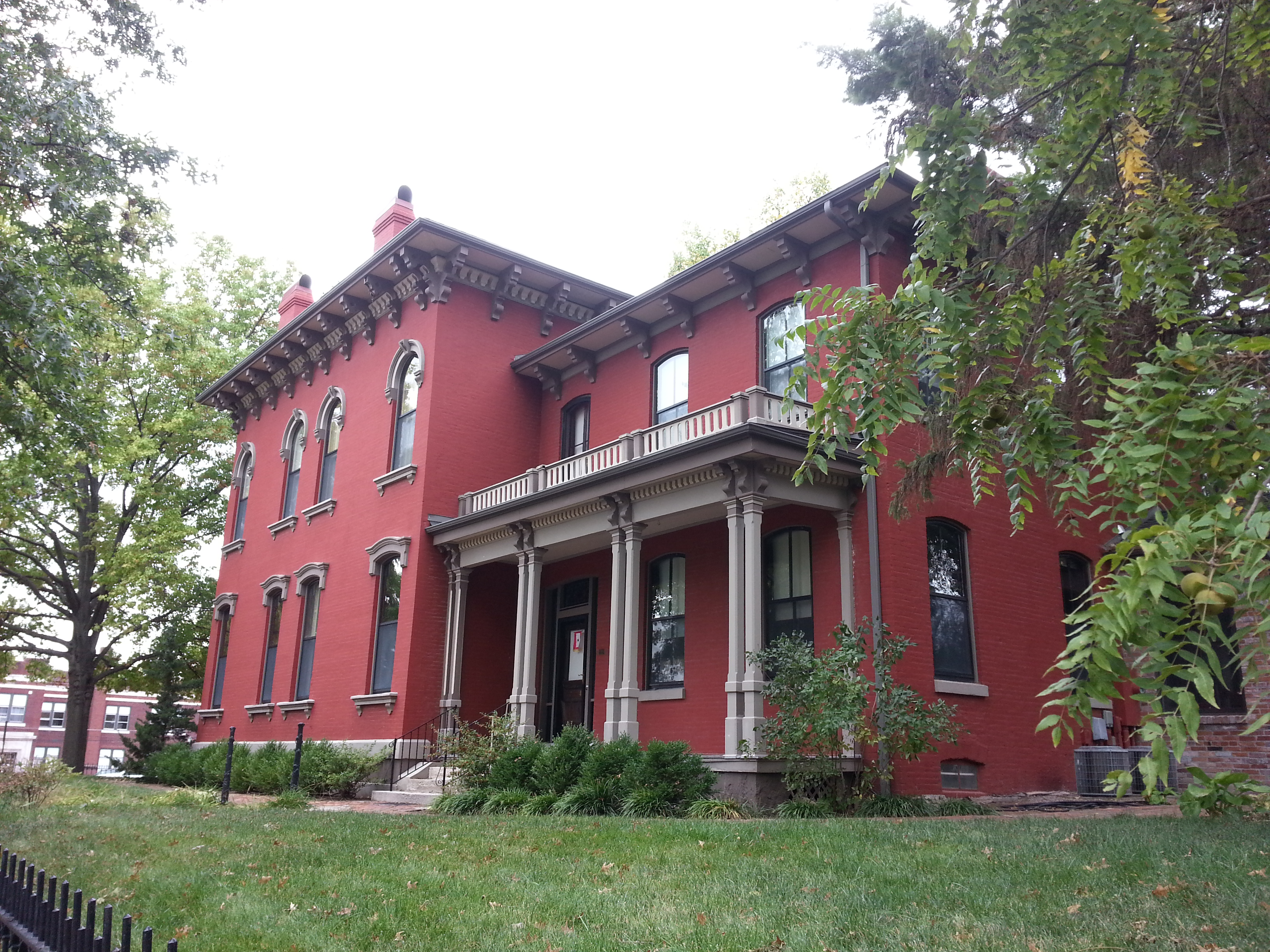
Merritt Insley House.

== See also ==
- National Register of Historic Places listings in Leavenworth County, Kansas
- List of National Historic Landmarks in Kansas
