= Leavenworth High School =

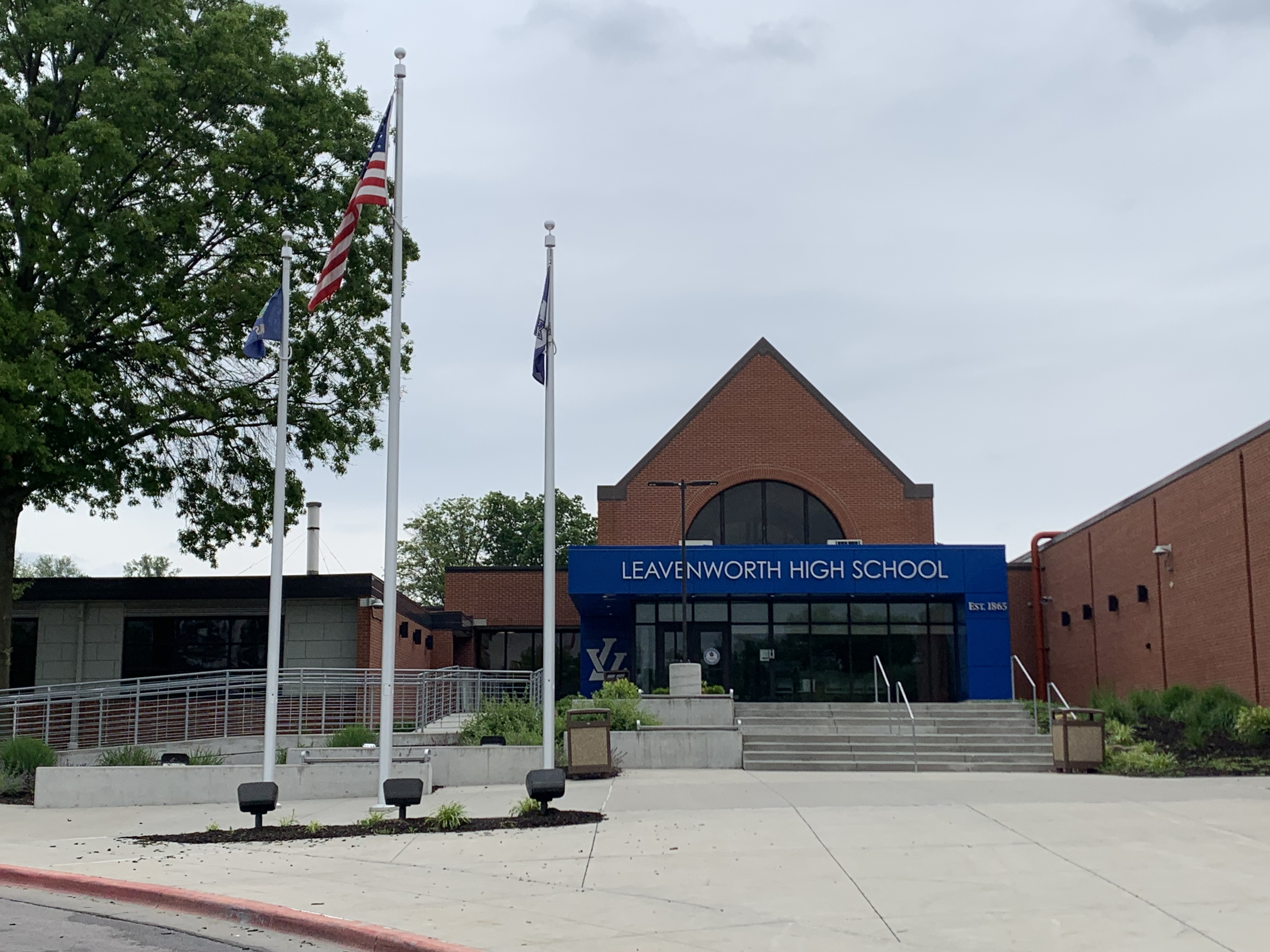
- Leavenworth Senior High School (2025)

Location
- 2012 10th Avenue; Leavenworth, Kansas 66048; 39°17′46″N 94°55′47″W

Information
- School type: Public, High School
- Established: 1865
- Status: Open
- School district: Leavenworth USD 453
- Superintendent: Kellen J. Adams
- Principal: James Vanek
- Teaching staff: 69.0 (on an FTE basis)
- Grades: 9 to 12
- Gender: coed
- Enrollment: 1288 (2023–24)
- Student to teacher ratio: 18.67
- Language: English
- Schedule type: Block
- Hours in school day: 7 hours
- Colors: Blue; White
- Slogan: Home of the Pioneers
- Athletics: KSHSAA 5A
- Athletics conference: United Kansas Conference
- Sports: Baseball, Basketball, Bowling, Cross Country, Football, Golf, Soccer, Softball, Swimming, Tennis, Track & Field, Volleyball, Wrestling
- Mascot: Pioneer Pete
- Nickname: LV, LHS
- Team name: Pioneers or Lady Pioneers
- Rival: Lansing High School
- Yearbook: Junebug
- Communities served: Leavenworth, Fort Leavenworth
- Affiliations: KSHSAA
- Website: lhs.usd453.org

Leavenworth High School is a public high school located in Leavenworth, Kansas, operated by Leavenworth USD 453 school district. The school was established in 1865, making it one of the first high schools in Kansas. The school colors are blue and white and the mascot is the "Pioneer". Leavenworth High School offers many extracurricular activities, both athletic and non-athletic.

The district, of which this is the sole comprehensive high school, includes the central portion of Leavenworth city. Additionally, Fort Leavenworth, which is in Fort Leavenworth USD 207, sends its high school students to Leavenworth High (while PK-9 goes to USD 207).

== History ==
The school was established in 1865, making it one of the first high schools in the state of Kansas. Students studied Latin, math, rhetoric, science, Caesar and Virgil like their counterparts from the East Coast.

== Extracurricular activities ==
=== Athletics ===
The Pioneers compete in the United Kansas Conference and are classified as a 5A school, the second largest classification in Kansas, according to the Kansas State High School Activities Association. Throughout its history, Leavenworth has won several state championships in various sports.

=== State championships ===
State Championships
Season	Sport/Activity	Number of Championships	Year
Fall	Cross Country, Boys	2	1975, 1976
Winter	Wrestling	1	1972
Winter	Basketball, Boys	1	2000
Winter	Basketball, Girls	4	1988, 1989, 2014, 2015
Winter	Bowling, Girls	1	2007
Spring	Golf, Boys	2	1968, 1981
Spring	Track and Field, Boys	4	1974, 1978, 1994, 2001
Spring	Track and Field, Girls	11	1994, 1996, 1997, 1998, 1999, 2000, 2001, 2005, 2006, 2007, 2008
Total		26	

== Notable alumni ==
- Pat Baldwin, assistant coach for the Valparaiso Beacons, former head coach for the Milwaukee Panthers
- Mary Byrd, pioneer astronomy professor and astronomer
- Sharice Davids, United States House Representative for Kansas's 3rd congressional district
- Murry Dickson, former Major League Baseball pitcher
- Melissa Etheridge, musician
- Gary Foster, American instrumentalist
- Amy Hastings, distance runner, NCAA champion, Olympian, 2017 World Championships marathon medalist
- Linda Powell, actress
- Norman Ramsey, awarded the 1989 Nobel Prize in Physics
- Robert A. Rosenberg, U.S. Air Force major general
- Richard Sanders, Actor, WKRP in Cincinnati
- Wayne Simien, former All-American basketball player for the Kansas Jayhawks and NBA champion with the Miami Heat
- Edwin Slosson, editor, author and chemist
- Theresa Vail, 2013 Miss Kansas
- J. White Did It, record producer, songwriter, and DJ

== See also ==
- List of high schools in Kansas
- List of unified school districts in Kansas
