= Leavenworth USD 453 =

Public school district in Leavenworth, Kansas

Address
- 200 N. 4th St. Leavenworth, Kansas, 66048; United States
- Coordinates: 39°19′12″N 94°54′51″W

District information
- Type: Public
- Grades: K to 12
- Superintendent: Kellen Adams
- Schools: 8

Students and staff
- Students: 3,457 (2023–2024)
- Faculty: 218.50 (on an FTE basis)
- Student–teacher ratio: 15.82:1

Other information
- Website: usd453.org

Leavenworth USD 453 is a public unified school district headquartered in Leavenworth, Kansas, United States. The district includes the central portion of Leavenworth city.

== Administration ==
The school district is under the administration of Superintendent Kellen Adams.

== Board of education ==
The Leavenworth School District is governed by a seven-member Board of Education. In Leavenworth, school board members are elected at large by the entire community. The board meets on the third Wednesday, of each month, at the Leavenworth Administrative Office.

== Schools ==
The school district operates the following schools:

- Leavenworth High School (9–12)
- Richard W. Warren Middle School (7–8)
- Leavenworth Intermediate School (part of the Warren campus (5-6)
- Anthony Elementary School (1–4)
- David Brewer Elementary School (1–4)
- Henry Leavenworth Elementary School (1–4)
- Earl Lawson Early Education Center (preK-K)
- Nettie Hartnett Education Center (3rd Avenue School, Quest 18-21 Program, Virtual School)

== See also ==
- Fort Leavenworth USD 207
- List of high schools in Kansas
- List of unified school districts in Kansas
- Kansas State Department of Education
- Kansas State High School Activities Association
