= Carnegie Arts Center of Leavenworth, Kansas =

- Leavenworth Public Library
- U.S. National Register of Historic Places
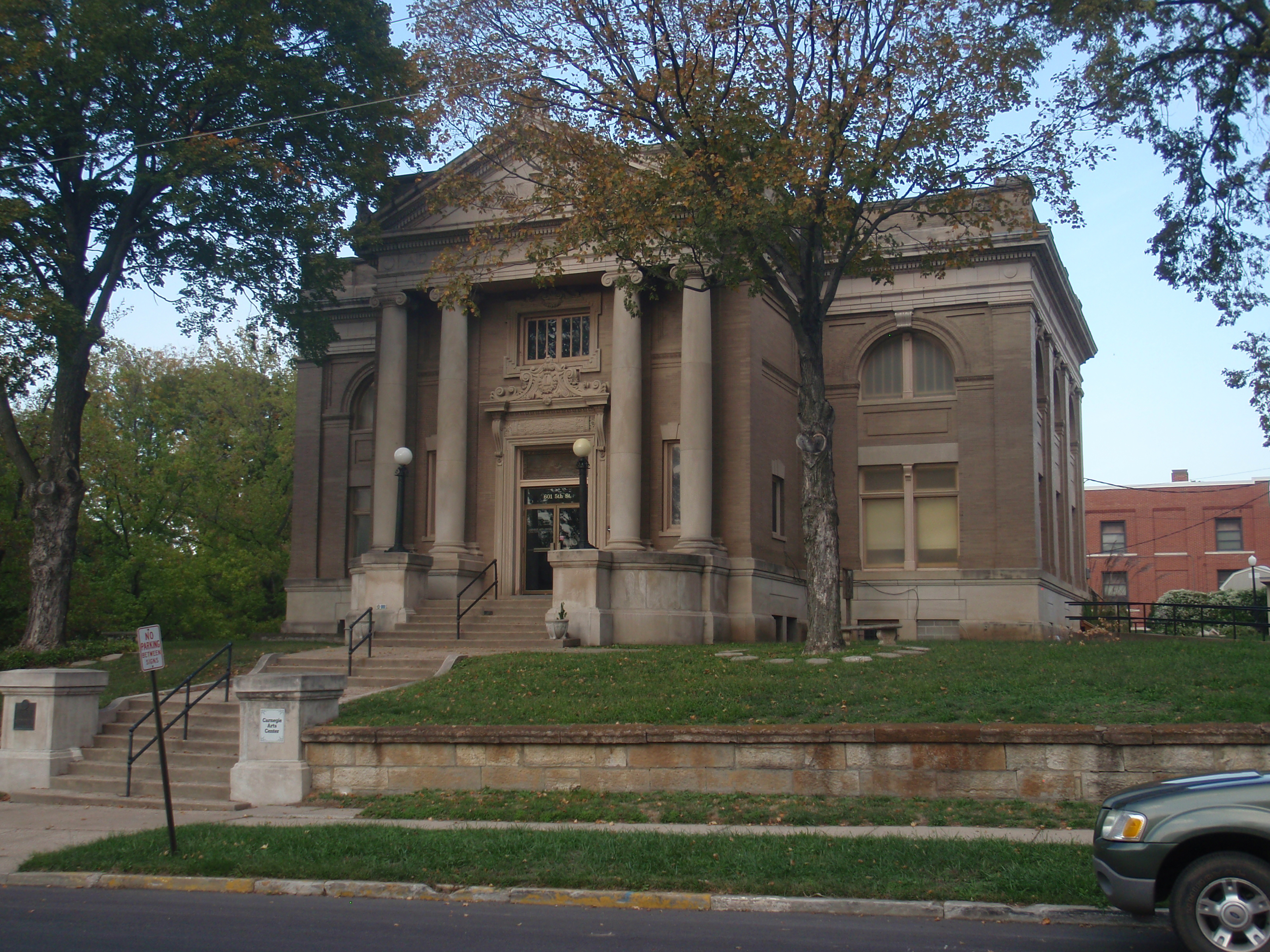

- Location within Kansas Location within the United States
- Location: Leavenworth, Kansas
- Coordinates: 39°18′48″N 94°54′55″W
- Built: 1900
- Architect: Marshall R. Sanguinet
- Architectural style: Classical Revival
- NRHP reference No.: 86002010
- Added to NRHP: July 30, 1986

The Carnegie Arts Center of Leavenworth, Kansas an historic building in namesake city. It was originally the Leavenworth Public Library. Constructed in 1900 with funds donated by Andrew Carnegie, the two-story brick and limestone building was the first Carnegie Library in Kansas. The architect was Marshall R. Sanguinet of Fort Worth, Texas, who designed the Dallas Public Library at the same time. It is listed on the State and National Registers of Historic Places.

From 1902 to 1987, the building housed the Leavenworth Public Library. From 1987 to 2012, the Carnegie Arts Center was housed in this building. It was a nonprofit organization which taught visual arts, painting, art history, music, dance, pottery and drama in the Leavenworth community for 25 years.

In 2012 upon the disbanding of the nonprofit organization, ownership of the building was reverted to the city of Leavenworth, Kansas.
