= Fort Leavenworth USD 207 =

Public school district in Fort Leavenworth, Kansas

Address
- 207 Education Way Fort Leavenworth, Kansas, 66027; United States
- Coordinates: 39.353082°N 94.921789°W

District information
- Type: Public
- Grades: Pre-K to 12 (High school contracted to Leavenworth High School)
- Established: 1901
- Superintendent: Keith Mispagel
- Schools: 4
- NCES District ID: 2006330

Students and staff
- Students: 1996
- Colors: Navy; Dark green

Other information
- Website: usd207.org

Fort Leavenworth USD 207 is a public unified school district headquartered in Fort Leavenworth, Kansas, United States.

== Administration ==
The school district is currently under the administration of Superintendent Keith Mispagel.

== Board of education ==
The Board of Education is currently under the leadership of Myron Griswold.

== Schools ==
The school district operates the following schools:

- Patton Jr. High School (7–9)
- Bradley Elementary School (K-6)
- Eisenhower Elementary School (K–6)
- MacArthur Elementary School (K–6)

High school students go to Leavenworth High School of Leavenworth USD 453.

== See also ==
- Leavenworth USD 453
- List of high schools in Kansas
- List of unified school districts in Kansas
- Kansas State Department of Education
- Kansas State High School Activities Association
