= List of radio stations owned by Audacy, Inc. =

The following is a list of radio stations owned by Audacy, Inc. As of June 2023, Audacy (then known as Entercom) operates 227 radio stations in 45 media markets across the United States.

On February 2, 2017, Entercom announced that it had agreed to acquire CBS Radio. The purchase gave Entercom operations in 23 of the top 25 markets, making it the second-largest owner of radio stations in the United States, behind only iHeartMedia. The merger became official on November 17, 2017.

== Arizona ==
Phoenix
Station	Frequency	Band	Format
KALV-FM	101.5	FM	Contemporary hit radio
KMLE	107.9	FM	Country music
KOOL-FM	94.5	FM	Classic hits

== California ==
Los Angeles
Station	Frequency	Band	Format
KCBS-FM	93.1	FM	Adult hits
KNX	1070	AM	All-news radio
KNX-FM	97.1	FM	Sports radio
KROQ-FM	106.7	FM	Alternative rock
KRTH	101.1	FM	Classic hits
KTWV	94.7	FM	Rhythmic adult contemporary

Riverside-San Bernardino
Station	Frequency	Band	Format
KFRG	95.1	FM	Country music
KXFG	92.9	FM	Country music (KFRG)

Sacramento
Station	Frequency	Band	Format
KIFM	1320	AM	Sports radio (ESPN Radio)
KKDO	94.7	FM	Alternative rock
KRXQ	98.5	FM	Active rock
KSEG	96.9	FM	Classic rock
KSFM	102.5	FM	Urban contemporary
KUDL	106.5	FM	Contemporary hit radio

San Diego
Station	Frequency	Band	Format
KBZT	94.9	FM	Alternative rock
KSON	103.7	FM	Country music
KWFN	97.3	FM	Sports radio
KXSN	98.1	FM	Classic hits
KYXY	96.5	FM	Adult contemporary

San Francisco
Station	Frequency	Band	Format
KCBS	740	AM	All-news radio
KFRC-FM	106.9	FM	All-news radio (KCBS)
KGMZ-FM	95.7	FM	Sports radio
KITS	105.3	FM	Alternative rock
KLLC	97.3	FM	Hot adult contemporary
KRBQ	102.1	FM	Classic hip hop

== Colorado ==
Denver
Station	Frequency	Band	Format
KALC	105.9	FM	Hot adult contemporary
KAMP	1430	AM	Sports gambling
KQKS	107.5	FM	Rhythmic Top 40
KQKS-HD2	107.5-2	FM	Country music
KQKS-HD2	103.1	FM	Country music
KQMT	99.5	FM	Classic rock

== Connecticut ==
Hartford
Station	Frequency	Band	Format
WRCH	100.5	FM	Adult contemporary
WTIC	1080	AM	Talk radio
WTIC-FM	96.5	FM	Hot adult contemporary
WZMX	93.7	FM	Rhythmic Top 40

== District of Columbia ==
Washington
Station	Frequency	Band	Format
WDCH-FM	99.1	FM	Business news (Bloomberg)
WIAD	94.7	FM	Classic hits
WJFK	1580	AM	Sports gambling
WJFK-FM	106.7	FM	Sports radio
WLZL	107.9	FM	Spanish/English rhythmic contemporary
WPGC-FM	95.5	FM	Urban contemporary
WTEM	980	AM	Sports radio

== Florida ==
Gainesville-Ocala
Station	Frequency	Band	Format
WKTK	98.5	FM	Adult contemporary
WSKY-FM	97.3	FM	Talk radio

Miami (South Florida)
Station	Frequency	Band	Format
WAXY	790	AM	Spanish conservative talk radio
WKIS	99.9	FM	Country music
WLYF	101.5	FM	Adult contemporary
WMXJ	102.7	FM	Classic hits
WPOW	96.5	FM	Classic hip hop
WQAM	560	AM	Sports radio (WQAM-FM)
WQAM-FM	104.3	FM	Sports radio

Orlando
Station	Frequency	Band	Format
WJHM	101.9	FM	Classic hip hop
WOCL	105.9	FM	Classic hits
WOMX-FM	105.1	FM	Hot adult contemporary

== Georgia ==
Atlanta
Station	Frequency	Band	Format
WAOK	1380	AM	Urban talk radio
WSTR	94.1	FM	Rhythmic adult contemporary
WVEE	103.3	FM	Urban contemporary
WZGC	92.9	FM	Sports radio

== Illinois ==
Chicago
Station	Frequency	Band	Format
WBBM	780	AM	All-news radio
WBBM-FM	96.3	FM	Rhythmic Top 40
WSCR-FM	104.3	FM	Sports radio (WSCR)
WCFS-FM	105.9	FM	All-news radio (WBBM)
WSCR	670	AM	Sports radio
WUSN	99.5	FM	Country music
WXRT	93.1	FM	Adult album alternative

== Kansas ==
Wichita
Station	Frequency	Band	Format
KDGS	93.5	FM	Rhythmic Top 40
KEYN-FM	103.7	FM	Classic hits
KFBZ	105.3	FM	Hot adult contemporary
KFH	1240	AM	Sports radio
KFH	97.5	FM	Sports radio
KNSS	1330	AM	Talk radio
KNSS-FM	98.7	FM	Talk radio (KNSS)

== Louisiana ==
New Orleans
Station	Frequency	Band	Format
WEZB	97.1	FM	Contemporary hit radio
WKBU	95.7	FM	Classic rock
WLMG	101.9	FM	Adult contemporary
WWL	870	AM	Talk radio
WWL-FM	105.3	FM	Talk radio (WWL)
WWWL	1350	AM	Sports gambling
WWWL	92.9	FM	Sports gambling

== Maryland ==
Baltimore
Station	Frequency	Band	Format
WJZ	1300	AM	Sports gambling
WJZ-FM	105.7	FM	Sports radio
WLIF	101.9	FM	Adult contemporary
WWMX	106.5	FM	Hot adult contemporary

== Massachusetts ==
Boston
Station	Frequency	Band	Format
WBGB	103.3	FM	Adult hits
WEEI	850	AM	Sports gambling
WEEI-FM	93.7	FM	Sports radio
WMJX	106.7	FM	Adult contemporary
WVEI	1440	AM	Sports radio (WEEI)
WBMX	104.1	FM	Hot adult contemporary

Springfield
Station	Frequency	Band	Format
WHLL	1450	AM	Spanish contemporary
WHLL	98.1	FM	Spanish contemporary
WMAS-FM	94.7	FM	Adult contemporary
WWEI	105.5	FM	Sports radio (WEEI)

== Michigan ==
Detroit
Station	Frequency	Band	Format
WDZH	98.7	FM	Alternative rock
WOMC	104.3	FM	Classic hits
WWJ	950	AM	All-news radio
WXYT	1270	AM	Sports gambling
WXYT-FM	97.1	FM	Sports radio
WYCD	99.5	FM	Country music

== Minnesota ==
Minneapolis
Station	Frequency	Band	Format
KMNB	102.9	FM	Country music
KZJK	104.1	FM	Adult hits
WCCO	830	AM	Talk radio

== Missouri ==
Kansas City
Station	Frequency	Band	Format
KFNZ	610	AM	Sports radio
KFNZ-FM	96.5	FM	Sports radio
KMBZ	980	AM	Talk radio
KMBZ-FM	98.1	FM	Talk radio
KQRC-FM	98.9	FM	Active rock
KWOD	1660	AM	Sports gambling
KYYS	1250	AM	Regional Mexican
KZPT	99.7	FM	Hot adult contemporary
WDAF-FM	106.5	FM	Country music

St. Louis
Station	Frequency	Band	Format
KEZK-FM	102.5	FM	Adult contemporary
KEZK-FM HD2	102.5-2	FM	Urban contemporary
KEZK-FM HD2	98.7	FM	Urban contemporary
KFTK-FM	97.1	FM	Talk radio
KMOX	1120	AM	Talk radio
KMOX-FM	104.1	FM	Talk radio (KMOX)
KYKY	98.1	FM	Hot adult contemporary
WFUN-FM	96.3	FM	Urban adult contemporary

== Nevada ==
Las Vegas
Station	Frequency	Band	Format
KLUC-FM	98.5	FM	Contemporary hit radio
KMXB	94.1	FM	Hot adult contemporary
KMXB-HD3	94.1-3	FM	Talk radio
KMXB-HD3	101.5	FM	Talk radio
KXQQ-FM	100.5	FM	Rhythmic adult contemporary

== New York ==
Buffalo
Station	Frequency	Band	Format
WBEN	930	AM	Talk radio
WGR	550	AM	Sports radio
WKSE	98.5	FM	Contemporary hit radio
WGR-FM	107.7	FM	Sports radio (WGR)
WGR-FM	104.7	FM	Sports radio (WGR)
WWKB	1520	AM	Sports gambling
WWWS	1400	AM	Rhythmic oldies
WWWS	107.3	FM	Rhythmic oldies

New York
Station	Frequency	Band	Format
WCBS-FM	101.1	FM	Classic hits
WFAN	660	AM	Sports radio
WFAN-FM	101.9	FM	Sports radio (WFAN)
WHSQ	880	AM	Sports radio
WINS	1010	AM	All-news radio
WINS-FM	92.3	FM	All-news radio (WINS)
WNEW-FM	102.7	FM	Hot adult contemporary
WXBK	94.7	FM	Classic hip hop
WXBK-HD2	94.7-2	FM	Country music

Rochester
Station	Frequency	Band	Format
WBEE-FM	92.5	FM	Country music
WBZA	98.9	FM	Adult hits
WCMF-FM	96.5	FM	Classic rock
WPXY-FM	97.9	FM	Contemporary hit radio
WROC	950	AM	Sports radio

== North Carolina ==
Greensboro
Station	Frequency	Band	Format
WJMH	102.1	FM	Urban contemporary
WPAW	93.1	FM	Country music
WQMG	97.1	FM	Urban adult contemporary
WSMW	98.7	FM	Adult hits

== Ohio ==
Cleveland
Station	Frequency	Band	Format
WDOK	102.1	FM	Adult contemporary
WKRK-FM	92.3	FM	Sports radio
WNCX	98.5	FM	Classic rock
WQAL	104.1	FM	Hot adult contemporary

== Oregon ==
Portland
Station	Frequency	Band	Format
KGON	92.3	FM	Classic rock
KMTT	910	AM	Sports radio
KNRK	94.7	FM	Alternative rock
KRSK	1080	AM	Sports radio (KRSK-FM)
KRSK-FM	105.1	FM	Sports radio
KWJJ-FM	99.5	FM	Country music
KYCH-FM	97.1	FM	Adult hits

== Pennsylvania ==
Philadelphia
Station	Frequency	Band	Format
KYW	1060	AM	All-news radio
WBEB	101.1	FM	Adult contemporary
WIP-FM	94.1	FM	Sports radio
WOGL	98.1	FM	Classic hits
WPHI-FM	103.9	FM	All-news radio (KYW)
WPHT	1210	AM	Talk radio
WTDY-FM	96.5	FM	Country music

Pittsburgh
Station	Frequency	Band	Format
KDKA	1020	AM	Talk radio
KDKA	100.1	FM	Talk radio
KDKA-FM	93.7	FM	Sports radio
WAMO	660	AM	Urban contemporary
WBZZ	100.7	FM	Contemporary hit radio
WBZZ-HD2	100.7-2	FM	90s/2000s hits
WDSY-FM	107.9	FM	Country music

Wilkes-Barre/Scranton
Station	Frequency	Band	Format
WAAF	910	AM	Talk radio (WILK-FM)
WGGY	101.3	FM	Country music
WILK	980	AM	Talk radio (WILK-FM)
WILK-FM	103.1	FM	Talk radio
WKRF	107.9	FM	Contemporary hit radio (WKRZ)
WKRZ	98.5	FM	Contemporary hit radio
WLMZ-FM	102.3	FM	Spanish tropical
WLMZ	1300	AM	Spanish tropical (WLMZ-FM)

== South Carolina ==
Greenville-Spartanburg
Station	Frequency	Band	Format
WFBC-FM	93.7	FM	Contemporary hit radio
WFBC-HD2	93.7-2	FM	Mainstream urban
WFBC-HD2	96.3	FM	Mainstream urban
WFBC-HD2	104.5	FM	Mainstream urban
WFBC-HD2	107.7	FM	Mainstream urban
WFBC-HD3	93.7-3	FM	Sports radio
WFBC-HD3	97.1	FM	Sports radio
WFBC-HD3	97.7	FM	Sports radio
WFBC-HD3	101.5	FM	Sports radio
WORD	950	AM	Talk radio (WYRD)
WROQ	101.1	FM	Country music
WTPT	93.3	FM	Active rock
WYRD	1330	AM	Talk radio
WYRD	98.9-2	FM	Talk radio
WYRD-FM	98.9	FM	Talk radio

== Tennessee ==
Chattanooga
Station	Frequency	Band	Format
WKXJ	105.5	FM	Contemporary hit radio
WLND	98.1	FM	Adult hits
WRXR-FM	103.7	FM	Active rock
WUSY	100.7	FM	Country music
WUSY-HD2	100.7-2	FM	Mainstream urban
WUSY-HD2	97.7	FM	Mainstream urban

Memphis
Station	Frequency	Band	Format
WLFP	99.7	FM	Country music
WMC	790	AM	Sports gambling
WMFS	680	AM	Sports radio
WMFS-FM	92.9	FM	Sports radio (WMFS)
WRVR	104.5	FM	Adult contemporary

== Texas ==
Austin
Station	Frequency	Band	Format
KAMX	94.7	FM	Hot adult contemporary
KJCE	1370	AM	Talk radio
KKMJ-FM	95.5	FM	Adult contemporary
KKMJ-HD3	95.5-3	FM	Classic country
KKMJ-HD3	95.9	FM	Classic country

Dallas
Station	Frequency	Band	Format
KJKK	100.3	FM	Adult hits
KMVK	107.5	FM	Regional Mexican
KRLD	1080	AM	All-news/Talk radio
KRLD-FM	105.3	FM	Sports radio
KSPF	98.7	FM	Classic hits
KVIL	103.7	FM	Alternative rock
KVIL-HD2	103.7-2	FM	Smooth jazz

Houston
Station	Frequency	Band	Format
KHMX	96.5	FM	Hot adult contemporary
KIKK	650	AM	Sports gambling
KIKK-FM	95.7	FM	Sports radio
KILT	610	AM	Sports radio
KILT-FM	100.3	FM	Country music
KLOL	101.1	FM	Spanish contemporary

== Virginia ==
Norfolk
Station	Frequency	Band	Format
WNVZ	104.5	FM	Rhythmic Top 40
WPTE	94.9	FM	Hot adult contemporary
WVKL	95.7	FM	Urban adult contemporary
WWDE-FM	101.3	FM	Adult contemporary

Richmond
Station	Frequency	Band	Format
WBTJ	106.5	FM	Urban contemporary
WRNL	910	AM	Sports radio
WRNL	105.1	FM	Sports radio
WRVA	1140	AM	Talk radio
WRVQ	94.5	FM	Contemporary hit radio
WRXL	102.1	FM	Alternative rock
WRXL-HD2	102.1-2	FM	Country music
WRXL-HD2	98.5	FM	Country music
WTVR-FM	98.1	FM	Adult contemporary

== Washington ==
Seattle
Station	Frequency	Band	Format
KHTP	103.7	FM	Classic hip hop
KISW	99.9	FM	Active rock
KKWF	100.7	FM	Country music
KNDD	107.7	FM	Alternative rock
KSWD	94.1	FM	Hot adult contemporary

== Wisconsin ==
Madison
Station	Frequency	Band	Format
WMHX	105.1	FM	Hot adult contemporary
WMMM-FM	105.5	FM	Adult album alternative
WOLX-FM	94.9	FM	Classic hits

Milwaukee
Station	Frequency	Band	Format
WMYX-FM	99.1	FM	Hot adult contemporary
WSSP	1250	AM	Sports radio
WXSS	103.7	FM	Contemporary hit radio
