= LGBTQ radio =

Since the mid 20th century, radio has served as a way for members of the LGBTQ community to share information and music both within and outside the community. Radio programs produced by LGBTQ people and stations featuring LGBTQ management have existed across the world. Internet radio stations targeted towards the LGBTQ community have also increased since the early 2000s. LGBTQ radio programs have often made use of community or pirate radio, to circumvent regulation or censorship by government authorities or corporations.

== Australia ==
On December 1, 1993, Joy Melbourne 90.7, a volunteer-run gay and lesbian station, began broadcasting in Melbourne. The station was the country's first LGBTQ radio station.

=== 1980s–1990s programmes ===
- Gay Waves, 2SER, Sydney (launched 1987)
- Wild Gals Lesbian and Gay Radio Show
- Radio Skid Row, Sydney University

== Canada ==
In Canada, the rise of LGBTQ radio programs occurred alongside the expansion of community radio, with the first community radio stations launching in 1974. 482

On August 9, 1978, Gay News and Views made its debut on CKMS-FM, a community radio station run by the University of Waterloo. The program, the "first regularly scheduled gay radio program in Canada", was produced by the Kitchener-Waterloo Gay Media Collective. In September 1978, Vancouver saw its first gay radio program with Coming Out, broadcast on Vancouver Co-operative Radio (CFRO-FM). In June 1979, the Lesbian Show debuted on CFRO-FM, becoming the country's first lesbian radio program. According to a co-founder of the Lesbian Show, Silva Tenenbein, the show grew out of tensions within the "male-dominated" Coming Out program and larger tensions within the Canadian feminist community.

By the mid-1990s, CITR-FM in Vancouver was broadcasting the program Queer FM.

In April 2007, Proud FM was launched in Toronto, becoming the country's "first mainstream, commercial station" for an LGBTQ audience.

== Denmark ==
Radio Rosa launched in Copenhagen on 22 June 1983, with the backing of the Danish National Association of Gays and Lesbians. The station closed in 2010.

== France ==
Clandestine radio broadcasts by lesbians occurred as early as 1978, by the group Les Radioteuses, who were shut down following their first broadcast. The group reorganized as Radio Nanas, and legally in 1981 as Les Nanas Radioteuses.

The early 1980s saw a number of gay and lesbian radio programs in France as state control of radio officially ended. The lesbian radio collective Femmes Entre Elles (Canal Gay Radio Savane, Rennes) produced multiple lesbian programs, as did the broadcasting collective Les Jardins de Selene (Amiens); other collectives also existed in Marseille and Paris.

The Parisian free radio station Fréquence Gaie was launched in 1981; in 1982, it became the "world's first 24-hour gay radio program". Originally aimed primarily at gay men, programs produced by and for lesbians began to increase under the leadership of station president Genevieve Pastre, elected in June 1982. In early 1983, the station was rated fourth in the city in a public opinion survey. Due to financial troubles, the station floundered, and its LGBTQ audience had largely left by 1985.

By 1983, stations broadcasting gay and lesbian programming, called "antennes roses" (English: "Pink stations") existed in at least 27 French towns and cities; by 1984, there were between 36 and 50. In 1984, the first International Meeting of Male and Female Hosts of Homosexual Broadcasts in France was held.

=== 1980s programs ===
- A tout coeur (serial, Fréquence Gaie)
- Amazones du soir, bonsoir! (Fréquence Gaie)
- Cinema de traverse (Fréquence Gaie)
- Coeur de femmes (Fréquence Gaie)
- Coup de foudre (Radio Atlantic, Nantes)
- Dix questions, dix responses (call-in show, Fréquence Gaie)
- Mailles a l'envers (Angers)
- Mauvaises Frequentations (Radio Leon)
- Peche a la ligne (au féminin) (Fréquence Gaie)
- Pour ou contre (debate show, Fréquence Gaie)
- Sapho Nights (Fréquence Gaie)
- Voyage en grande lesbian (Fréquence Gaie)

== Germany ==
In August 1985, the twice-weekly LGBTQ program Eldoradio began airing on the Berlin Cable Network. Named after Eldorado, a gay bar in Berlin during the 1920s, the two-hour program had "music, jokes, and self-produced radio plays" during the Sunday time slot, with Wednesday's program focusing on news and reporting. By the end of the year, Eldoradio had joined Radio 100, a "consort of alternative media groups" from Berlin. The show ended in 1989, due to financial troubles, including lack of advertisers.

== India ==
In July 2017, India's self-proclaimed "first LGBTQ radio show", titled Gaydio, launched. The show was a two-hour weekly program, broadcast in Mumbai and two other cities.

== Iran ==
In October 2012, Radio Ranginkaman launched as a 30-minute program for the LGBTQ community. Since then, it has grown into its own station, and broadcasts on shortwave, satellite and online radio. It broadcasts in both Dari and Persian.

== Malta ==
Malta has a DAB station which broadcasts GlitterBeam, an LGBTQ station based in the United Kingdom.

== Namibia ==
Namibian LGBTQ organization The Rainbow Project has broadcast the radio show Talking Pink since 1999.

== New Zealand ==
In the 1980s, Wellington Access Radio hosted multiple lesbian radio programs. The first of these was Leave the Dishes in the Sink, a feminist program which included some lesbians. In 1984, several lesbians developed an hour-long program, which aired once a month as part of the Womanzone feminist radio collective. In October 1984, the Lesbian Community Radio Programme (LCRP) was established. The weekly show had a variety of content, including news, poetry, educational segments, and updates on local events.

== South Africa ==
By 2007, In the Pink was broadcast on Bush Radio in Cape Town, being the country's "only gay radio program". As of 2016, GaySAradio, based in Pretoria, was the country's only LGBTQ radio station.

== Tunisia ==
In 2018, Shams Rad was founded in the country's capital,Tunis; the station is the self-proclaimed "only gay radio station" in the Arab world. The station airs music and programs discussing LGBTQ issues, but presenters do not "identify themselves as sexually active on air" due to laws in Tunisia that criminalize homosexuality. The station is partially funded by the Dutch embassy.

Station director Bouhdid Belhedi has reported receiving death threats for his part in the station.

== United Kingdom ==
In 1982, the community radio program Gaywaves began broadcast on a pirate station Our Radio in London. The two-hour program aired weekly on Wednesday nights. Although the show tried to include some lesbian programming, the program was mostly listened to by gay men, with programming shifting to reflect that. Segments included interviews, news, and skits. Program organizers also tried to incorporate material on the lives of gay men and lesbians outside the U.K.

The 1990s saw an increased number of gay and lesbian radio programs.

=== 1990s programmes ===
- G.A.Y., Spectrum 558, London (launched August 1992)
- A Sunday Outing, BBC Radio 4 (1993)
- Out This Week, BBC Radio 5 (February 1993-March 1999)
- Loud'n'proud, BBC Radio 1 (August–September 1993)
- Gay and Lesbian London, BBC Radio London
- Gaytalk, BBC Radio Manchester

=== 2000s-2020s ===
- Purple Radio (2001-2003)
- Gaydio (launched 2006)
- Out in South London, Resonance FM, London (launched 2008)
- Gaydar Radio (ended January 2013)
- GlitterBeam (launched 2019)
- Hits Radio Pride (launched 2020)

== United States ==
In 1956, Pacifica Radio became the first known listener-sponsored non-commercial American radio network to allow openly LGBTQ individuals airtime.

Lesbian radio projects primarily grew out of the feminist movement and its forays into radio. One of the nation's earliest LGBTQ radio programs was Lesbian Nation (1972-1973), an interview show created by Martha Shelley, a member of the Daughters of Bilitis and the Gay Liberation Front.

The 2000s saw a rise in LGBTQ radio programming in a corporate context. Clear Channel Radio launched a number of digital subchannels for its Pride Radio in 2006 and 2007, including in Chicago, Dallas, Los Angeles, Miami, and San Francisco.

=== 1970s programs ===
- Gay Perspective, Milwaukee, produced by the Gay People's Union
- Lesbian Nation (1972-1973)
- Sunshine Gay Dreams, WXPN, Philadelphia (launched 1972)
- Fruitpunch, KPFA, Berkeley (launched 1973)
- IMRU, KPFK, Los Angeles, produced by the Gay Radio Collective (launched 1974)
- SO GAY, WRSU-FM, New Brunswick, New Jersey; produced by the Rutgers University Gay/Lesbian Alliance (launched March 1975, )
- Just Before Dawn, KCHU (launched 1975)
- Wilde 'n' Stein, KPFT, Houston (interview program, launched 1975)
- The Gay Life, KSAN, San Mateo, California (launched 1976)

=== 1980s-1990s ===
==== Programs ====
- Gay Spirit Radio, WWUH, Hartford, Connecticut (launched November 1980)
- The Gay Show, WBAI, New York City (launched 1983)
- National Gay Network, San Francisco (1983-1985)
- This Way Out (launched April 1988)
- Hibernia Beach LIVE, KITS, San Francisco (1989-2000)
- One in Ten, WFNX-FM, Boston (launched October 1992)
- Outright Radio (launched 1999)

==== Stations ====
- KGAY, Denver (1992)
- LesBiGay Radio, WCBR-FM, Chicago (May 1994 – 2001)

=== 2000s ===
==== Programs ====
- BloomingOUT, WFHB, Bloomington, Indiana (launched 2003)
- The Six Pack, Sirius XM (2009-2012)

==== Stations ====
- OutQ, SiriusXM (2003)
- Pride Radio, Clear Channel Radio (2006)

=== 2010s ===
==== Programs ====
- OutCasting, WDFH, Ossining, New York (launched 2011)

==== Stations ====
- Channel Q, Audacy
- KGAY-FM, Palm Springs (2018)

== Internet radio ==
LGBTQ radio programming has been part of internet radio since the 1990s, with stations such as PNN Gay Radio and GLO Radio (later rebranded GayBC), both of which were founded in 1997. The number of internet radio stations targeted towards the LGBTQ community continued to increase in the early 2000s.

Internet radio offers the advantage of sidestepping regulations, as stations are not subject to content rules made by regulating bodies such as the FCC (in the United States). Another advantage is that unlike traditional radio, which is limited by distance, internet radio is limited only by an internet connection. This can allow LGBTQ listeners without local LGBTQ radio programming to still access the media.

=== 2000s radio stations ===
- AGRadio (Argentina)
- Circuito and Vibe (Brazil)
- Energize (U.K.)
- GayBC Radio Networrk
- Gay Dee Gay (Italy)
- Gay FM (Germany)
- ManCandy (U.K. and Canada)
- Queer FM (Australia)
- Radio Mitos (Chile)
- Radio Q (Romania)
- Radio Zonica (Argentina)
- Russian Gay Radio
- Stads (Netherlands)
