= WHZN (Pennsylvania) =

Radio station in Hazleton, Pennsylvania (1961–1965)

Hazleton, Pennsylvania; United States
- Frequency: 1300 kHz

Ownership
- Owner: Lou Adelman; (Radio 13, Inc.)

History
- First air date: October 25, 1961; 63 years ago
- Last air date: January 14, 1965; 60 years ago
- Former call signs: WTHT (1961–1964)

Technical information
- Power: 1,000 watts (daytime only)

WHZN was a radio station that operated on 1300 kHz in Hazleton, Pennsylvania, United States. It operated as WTHT from 1961 to 1964 and WHZN from 1964 to 1965. The station was owned by Lou Adelman and closed due to a strike by union workers amid mounting financial and regulatory troubles.

== History ==
WTHT signed on October 25, 1961, at 5:45 a.m.; the night before, the new station launched fireworks from its transmitter site off Hilltop Road southeast of town. The station was owned by Adelman through his Radio 13, Inc., and broadcast as a daytime-only station on 1300 kHz.

In April 1964, the call letters were changed to WHZN. Under its new designation, strife quickly mounted. In August, an election was ordered to determine if the station would be unionized under the National Association of Broadcast Employees and Technicians. Four of the five employees voted in favor; the fifth was absent the day of the election. After staff members David DeCosmo and Robert Pavlick were dismissed by management, on October 12, the four employees voted to strike; the station claimed their affiliation to NABET ineffective and charged the union with unfair practices for waiving its initiation fee. However, it would take another three months for a strike to happen. When it did, after negotiations broke down between the union and owner Adelman at 12:45 p.m. on January 14, 1965, it represented the final end for WHZN.

The union strike added to troubles already being faced by Adelman. The Federal Communications Commission set WHZN's license renewal for hearing in November over a series of rule violations relating to logs, operator qualifications, rebroadcast of programs from other radio stations, and violations of the Communications Act of 1934. In early December, Adelman had filed to sell the station for $75,000 to John R. Dorsey, who owned half of FM station WSMD in Waldorf, Maryland. When the commission set a conference prior to the renewal hearing, Adelman told the commission that he was not in a financial condition to proceed. He then surrendered the WHZN license to the FCC in February.

The WHZN physical plant was put up for auction that November. It was acquired by Broadcasters 7, Inc., whose president was the publisher of the Standard-Speaker newspaper. That November, Broadcasters 7 applied for a construction permit to reactivate the facility, this time licensed to nearby West Hazleton. The application was placed into comparative hearing with rival bids from Summit Broadcasting and CBM, Inc., in March 1969. The competing applicants merged in 1971; the next year, an FCC administrative law judge recommended denial of the Broadcasters 7 application. The decision, upheld by a review board in 1974, found that Broadcasters 7 had not done enough to specify its station as an outlet for West Hazleton, not for Hazleton, and that the station would not provide the requisite coverage of West Hazleton. While lawyers fought at the FCC, the facilities took damage: equipment was stolen in 1971, and a 1973 fire caused heavy interior damage.

The FCC would not issue a construction permit for a new station on the frequency in the Hazleton area until August 1981, when the Radio Action Company, owner of WQEQ (103.1 FM), was awarded a permit. The station went on air as WWKC in 1982.
