= WLMZ =

WLMZ may refer to:

- WLMZ (AM), a radio station (1300 AM) licensed to serve West Hazleton, Pennsylvania, United States
- WLMZ-FM, a radio station (102.3 FM) licensed to serve Pittston, Pennsylvania
