= Peter Flynn =

Peter Flynn may refer to:

- Peter Flynn (footballer) (born 1936), Scottish footballer
- Peter Flynn (sheriff), see Peter Forman
- C. Peter Flynn (1935–2011), Professor of Physics and of Materials Science at the University of Illinois at Urbana-Champaign
- Pete Flynn, see Purple Radio (London)
