= WBZU =

WBZU may refer to:

- WKVB (FM), a radio station (107.3 FM) licensed to serve Westborough, Massachusetts, United States, which held the call sign WBZU from February to March 2020
- WAAF (AM), a radio station (910 AM) licensed to serve Scranton, Pennsylvania, United States, which held the call sign WBZU from 2005 to 2020
- WMHX, a radio station (105.1 FM) licensed to serve Waunakee, Wisconsin, United States, which held the call sign WBZU from 2000 to 2005
- WBTJ, a radio station (106.5 FM) licensed to serve Richmond, Virginia, United States, which held the call sign WBZU from 1996 to 1998
- WPZZ, a radio station (104.7 FM) licensed to serve Crewe, Virginia, which held the call sign WBZU from 1995 to 1996
