= WSKY =

WSKY may refer to:

- WSKY (AM), a radio station (1230 AM) licensed to Asheville, North Carolina, United States
- WSKY-FM, a radio station (97.3 FM) licensed to Micanopy, Florida, United States
- WSKY-TV, a television station (channel 13, virtual 4) licensed to Manteo, North Carolina, United States
