= WODS =

WODS may refer to:

- WLMZ (AM), a radio station (1300 AM) licensed to serve West Hazleton, Pennsylvania, United States, which held the call sign WODS from 2020 to 2023
- WBGB (FM), a radio station (103.3 FM) licensed to serve Boston, Massachusetts, United States, which held the call sign WODS from 1987 to 2020
