= WDMT =

WDMT may refer to:

- WDMT (FM), a radio station (106.3 FM) licensed to Marlinton, West Virginia, United States
- WKRZ-HD2, a radio station (98.5 FM HD2) licensed to Freeland, Pennsylvania, United States, which carried the WDMT callsign from 2002 to 2013.
