= WGGY-HD2 =

Coordinates: 41.306°N 75.760°W

Digital subchannel of WGGY, Scranton
- Scranton, Pennsylvania; United States
- Broadcast area: Wilkes-Barre, Pennsylvania
- Frequency: 101.3 MHz (HD Radio via HD2)
- Branding: La Mega 95

Programming
- Format: Defunct (was Spanish CHR)

Ownership
- Owner: Audacy, Inc.; (Audacy License, LLC)
- Sister stations: WAAF; WGGY; WILK; WILK-FM; WKRZ; WLMZ-FM; WLMZ

History
- Call sign meaning: see WGGY

Technical information
- Licensing authority: FCC
- Facility ID: 36202
- Class: B
- ERP: 7,000 watts
- HAAT: 365 meters

Links
- Public license information: Public file; LMS
- Website: www.lamega95fm.com

WGGY-HD2 was a radio station subchannel in Scranton, Pennsylvania. The subchannel previously carried a Spanish CHR format and before that, an adult album alternative format. The station's website stated "Independent Radio" as part of its mission. Station IDs often included the phrase "It's different here." On August 5, 2013 The Mountain moved from its original frequency at 102.3 MHz under the call letters of WDMT to the HD2 sub-channel of 98.5 WKRZ and assumed the call letters WKRZ-HD2. WGGY and 98.5 KRZ are owned and operated by Audacy including radio stations WKRZ, WGGY, WILK-FM, WILK and most recently WHBS, taking The Mountain's frequency at 102.3 MHz under a new format. On April 26, 2019 The Mountain moved to WGGY's HD2 signal. In 2023, WGGY-HD3’s format moved to HD2. Eventually, the HD2 subchannel was also shut off.

== Format ==
The Mountain built its reputation on a "More Music, Less Hype" philosophy without typical on-air contests and stereotypical radio. The playlist includes old and new adult rock, many B-side tracks, as well as music from local artists in the Northeastern Pennsylvania region. The Mountain previously featured hosts referred to as "Mountain Guides," not DJs. Unlike typical DJs who run many promotions, the guides typically gave background on a musician or song. Great guides such as Lou Fontaine, Jack Meyers, Cathy Donnelly, and Jim Rising shared their passion for music with listeners until the move to the new frequency of 98.5-HD2.

Alan K. Stout's "Music On The Menu" show aired Sundays at 8pm on The Mountain until August 2013. Alan showcases music from local musicians, including interviews and live in-studio performances. Music On The Menu is an exclusive staple of the Northeast PA radio community, and continues to air on WWRR on Sundays at 9pm.

This formatting style is similar to those of other "Mountain" radio stations owned by Entercom, including KHTP in Seattle.

== Previous formats ==
The station previously operated as 102.3 Rebel Radio in the early 1990s, formatted after MTV. Playing the glam metal bands (hip hop added later) and wild station imaging brought Rebel Radio many critics.

The station died about the same time as glam metal lost popularity. It later reverted to Q-102, a Top 40 format and later Kiss 102.3 through the mid-1990s. Low ratings finally saw the change in ownership and change in formats. Buzz 102 played all '80s music, much of which consisted of shows syndicated from other markets. Ratings began to drop as this format began to wear out after about two years. It was at that point that the station began operating as The Mountain.

== Digital radio ==
The Mountain's digital signal requires an HD Radio receiver. The Mountain also streams via its website.
