= BloomingOUT =

LGBT+ radio show in Indiana

bloomingOUT is an LGBT+ radio show broadcast on WFHB in Bloomington, Indiana, United States. It is dedicated to the LGBTQ+ life, including history, current issues, culture, and more. It began broadcasting on October 7, 2003 and continues to air every Thursday from 6:00 - 7:00 PM EST.

The show generally includes 1-2 interviews, 1-2 segments, news, music, and calendar. bloomingOUT exists to educate, entertain, and stimulate listeners to engage in dialogue about real issues and events relevant to the LGBTQ+ and ally community. It strives to maintain an upbeat, informative, and entertaining show that facilitates communication and can be enjoyed by all. The show offers everyone a clear perspective into the culture, diversity, and humanity of the LGBTQ+ community. Because bloomingOUT is the only such media program in Indiana, and one of the few in the nation, it includes issues, views, and news that do not usually appear in mainstream media.

== bloomingOUT History ==
Carol Fischer and Helen Harrell founded the show in 2003. WFHB is located in downtown Bloomington, IN. Bloomington has received attention for its tolerance of LGBTQ people and culture. In the 1990s, Bloomington added sexual orientation to its human rights ordinance. The city launched the LGBT film fest (PRIDE) in 2004, which continues to this day. The town has one gay bar.

BloomingOUT has co-sponsored and provided entertainment for the 2005 and 2006 Bloomington Pride picnics which took place on the 4th of July in their respective years, and have partnerships with The Word, Pride of Indy Band and Color Guard as well as OutMedia and Bloomington Hospital's Positive Link. It is currently supported by The Backdoor, IU Health Bloomington, and the School of Public Health at Indiana University.

== Current bloomingOUT staff and hosts ==
  - Executive Producer & WFHB News Director - Kade Young
  - Producer - Melanie Davis
  - Board Engineer - Lucas Fisher
  - Anchor - Melanie Davis
  - Anchor - Justin Robertson
  - Anchor - Ireland Meacham
  - Anchor - Lucas Fisher

== Active Segments ==
- Open Doors by David Crosman, Meredith Seamon, Stormy Dayhuff, Matt Peterson, and Taylor Hurt

== Inactive Segments ==
(Not a complete list.)

- Out on Campus by Frankie Salzmann and Arielle Soussan
- Dear Straight People by Andrew Sims
- First Year Out by Nick Tumino
- Queer His/Herstory by Helen Harrell
- Coming Out of the Deviant's Closet by Victor Kinzer
- Critical Inqueery with Mark Brostoff & Helen Harrell
- Transformation Station with Ethan B.
- Our View by Jim Doud
- A Road for the Roadless by Abigail A. Sewell
- Verbal Terrorism: Poetry by Jada B.
- LGBT Book Zone by Tiffany Dow
- The Heart of Polyamory with Millie Jackson
- Youth In Peril with Greg Chafin (on-going series)
- Student Talk
- The Soul of Us On-going series of interviews with members of the faith community - 1st Thursday of every month
- Reclaiming Our Faith by Mark Lee
- In Transit by Deane Lahre
- Gay Destinations by Mark Brostoff
- Navajo Rainbow by Wesley Thomas
- Queering Culture by Victor Kinzer
- Student Talk by Kim Ruggles
- Gendered Variations by Corinne Datchi-Phillips
- Facing AIDS by Mark Lee
- It's Only Sex by Emily Nagoski
- What's Going On by Nita McB
- Legislative Update by Carolyn Wiethoff
- Straight Talk by Aimee Stanton
- The Bi Connection by Eric D. & Emily Cohen
- Chronicles of Rachael, Adventures of a Transwoman in the Heartland by Rachael
