= Channel Q =

American LGBTQ+ music radio network

Coordinates: 33.7876°N 84.3831°W

CHANNEL Q
- Country: United States

Programming
- Language(s): English
- Format: CHR and dance radio for the LGBTQ community; LGBTQ radio

Ownership
- Owner: Audacy, Inc.

History
- Launch date: 2018
- Former names: Out Now Radio; (August–November 2018)

Coverage
- Availability: HD Radio and FM affiliates; (see station list); Audacy

Links
- Webcast: Listen live (via Audacy)
- Website: www.audacy.com/wearechannelq

Channel Q (stylized as CHANNEL Q) is a CHR and dance radio network for the LGBTQ community, created, owned, and operated by Audacy, Inc. The network airs on the Audacy internet radio service, as well as on Audacy-owned terrestrial radio stations throughout the United States.

== History ==
Channel Q began as Out Now Radio and soft-launched in August 2018 on radio.com, as well as the HD Radio signal of Entercom's KAMP-FM in Los Angeles (97.1FM-HD2). A full launch occurred on October 11, 2018, a date chosen to coincide with National Coming Out Day, and featured a daily morning program co-hosted by Queer Eye alum Jai Rodriguez; weekly shows featuring internet personality B. Scott and lawyer and politician John Duran; and a revamped version of the syndicated radio program Loveline. By November 1, the network would adopt the Channel Q name, tweak its program lineup, and add its first analog radio affiliate (KQPS in Palm Springs, California).

Channel Q's founding brand manager was Brian Holt, who oversaw the station's programming from its 2018 launch. Under Holt, the station developed a format combining LGBTQ+-focused talk programming, including a revival of Loveline, with music. Holt retired from the role in July 2025 and was succeeded by Corey Crockett, who had joined Channel Q's on-air lineup in 2023 and was named Audacy's director of programming that year.

== Terrestrial radio affiliates ==
In addition to being heard on the Audacy internet radio platform, its related app, and the network's website, Channel Q is also heard on the terrestrial radio stations listed below. Those shown with an "HD2" or "HD3" suffix air Channel Q on an HD radio sub-channel that can be heard through HD–accommodating receivers.

=== Station list ===
Callsign	Frequency	Band	City	State	Network status
KALV-HD2*	101.5-2	FM	Phoenix	Arizona	Affiliate
KRTH-HD2*	101.1-2	FM	Los Angeles	California	Flagship
KKDO-HD2*	94.7-2	FM	Sacramento	California	Affiliate
KXSN-HD2*	98.1-2	FM	San Diego	California	Affiliate
KLLC-HD2*	97.3-2	FM	San Francisco	California	Affiliate
KALC-HD2*	105.9-2	FM	Denver	Colorado	Affiliate
WZMX-HD2*	93.7-2	FM	Hartford	Connecticut	Affiliate
WIAD-HD2*	94.7-2	FM	Washington, D.C.	District of Columbia	Affiliate
WPOW-HD3*	96.3-3	FM	Miami	Florida	Affiliate
WOMX-HD2*	105.1-2	FM	Orlando	Florida	Affiliate
WSTR-HD2*	94.1-2	FM	Atlanta	Georgia	Affiliate
WBBM-HD2*	96.3-2	FM	Chicago	Illinois	Affiliate
WEZB-HD2*	97.1-2	FM	New Orleans	Louisiana	Affiliate
WWMX-HD2*	106.5-2	FM	Baltimore	Maryland	Affiliate
WBGB-HD2*	103.3-2	FM	Boston	Massachusetts	Affiliate
WDZH-HD2*	98.7-2	FM	Detroit	Michigan	Affiliate
KZPT-FM-HD2*	99.7-2	FM	Kansas City	Missouri	Affiliate
KEZK-HD3*	102.5-3	FM	St. Louis	Missouri	Affiliate
KMXB-HD2*	94.1-2	FM	Las Vegas	Nevada	Affiliate
WNEW-HD2*	102.7-2	FM	New York City	New York	Affiliate
WPXY-HD2*	97.9-2	FM	Rochester	New York	Affiliate
WQAL-HD2*	104.1-3	FM	Cleveland	Ohio	Affiliate
KWJJ-HD2*	99.5-2	FM	Portland	Oregon	Affiliate
WTDY-HD2*	96.5-2	FM	Philadelphia	Pennsylvania	Affiliate
WBZZ-HD2*	100.7-2	FM	Pittsburgh	Pennsylvania	Affiliate
WLMZ-FM-HD2*	102.3-2	FM	Scranton	Pennsylvania	Affiliate
KVIL-HD2*	103.7-2	FM	Dallas	Texas	Affiliate
KHMX-HD2*	96.5-2	FM	Houston	Texas	Affiliate
WNVZ-HD2*	104.5-2	FM	Norfolk	Virginia	Affiliate
KNDD-HD2*	107.7-2	FM	Seattle	Washington	Affiliate
K277AE	103.3	FM	Seattle	Washington	n/a (KNDD-HD2 relay)
WMMM-HD2*	105.5	FM	Madison	Wisconsin	Affiliate
WXSS-HD3*	103.7-3	FM	Milwaukee	Wisconsin	Affiliate

=== Former affiliates ===
Callsign	Frequency	Band	City	State
KNX-HD2*	97.1-2	FM	Los Angeles	California
KQPS	103.1	FM	Palm Springs	California
KXSN-HD3*	98.1-3	FM	San Diego	California
KGMZ	1550	AM	San Francisco	California
K257GE	99.3	FM	San Francisco	California
WSTR-HD3*	94.1-3	FM	Atlanta	Georgia
WWMX-HD3*	106.5-3	FM	Baltimore	Maryland
WDZH-HD3*	98.7-3	FM	Detroit	Michigan
KRBZ-HD2*	96.5-2	FM	Kansas City	Missouri
WTSS-HD3*	102.5-3	FM	Buffalo	New York
WAAL-HD3*	104.1-3	FM	Cleveland	Ohio
KRSK-HD2*	105.1-2	FM	Portland	Oregon
WBZZ-HD3	100.7-3	FM	Pittsburgh	Pennsylvania
KVIL-HD3*	103.7-3	FM	Highland Park/Dallas	Texas
KKHH-HD2*	95.7-2	FM	Houston	Texas

- Asterisk (*) indicates HD Radio broadcast.
- Gray background indicates low-power FM translator.
- KQPS also served as Channel Q's monitored reporter on Billboard's Dance/Mix Show Airplay panel.

== See also ==
- Pride Radio, a competing LGBT-oriented radio service owned and operated by iHeartMedia
