= KKMJ-FM =

Radio station in Texas, United States

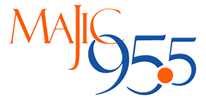
- Austin, Texas; United States
- Broadcast area: Greater Austin
- Frequency: 95.5 MHz (HD Radio)
- Branding: Majic 95.5

Programming
- Language: English
- Format: Adult contemporary
- Subchannels: HD2: Talk radio (KJCE); HD3: 95.9 Texas Country (Classic country)

Ownership
- Owner: Audacy, Inc.; (Audacy License, LLC)
- Sister stations: KAMX; KJCE

History
- First air date: November 2, 1957
- Former call signs: KAZZ (1957–1968); KOKE-FM (1968–1983); KLQT (1983–1986)
- Call sign meaning: "Majic"

Technical information
- Licensing authority: FCC
- Facility ID: 66489
- Class: C1
- ERP: 50,000 watts
- HAAT: 398 meters (1,306 ft)
- Transmitter coordinates: 30.323°N 97.800°W
- Translator: HD3: 95.9 K240EL (Austin)

Links
- Public license information: Public file; LMS
- Webcast: Listen live (via Audacy); Listen live (via Audacy) (HD3)
- Website: www.audacy.com/majic www.audacy.com/959texascountry (HD3)

KKMJ-FM (95.5 MHz "Majic 95.5") is a commercial radio station in Austin, Texas. It is owned by Audacy, Inc. and airs an adult contemporary radio format. The station has studios and offices on Westbank Drive, off Loop 360, near Westlake High School. The transmitter is off Buckman Mountain Road in Austin, amid numerous towers for other FM and TV stations. Like many AC stations, KKMJ flips to all-Christmas music from mid-November to Christmas Day. It uses the slogan "The Majic of Christmas."

== History ==
=== KAZZ ===
On November 2, 1957, 95.5 KAZZ first signed on the air. It was owned by Audioland Broadcasting, and powered at only 340 watts. The call sign KAZZ was supposed to rhyme with "jazz." The station played jazz, adult standards and big band music. At a time when few people owned FM radios, this was a rare "stand-alone" FM outlet, not co-owned with an AM radio station, TV station or newspaper.

The station was purchased in July 1964 by Monroe Lopez, owner of four Mexican restaurants in the Austin area. Under Lopez' ownership, KAZZ adopted a block-programming format featuring various types of music throughout the broadcast day. They included easy listening, jazz, country music, show tunes, R&B, and, starting in 1964, Top 40. That made KAZZ (now known as "Kay-Zee" or "Alive 95" on the air) the first FM station in Austin to play rock and roll. During this time, the station also expanded its broadcast day from 6am to 1am for 24 hours.

=== KOKE-FM ===
In December 1967, Lopez sold KAZZ to the owners of AM 1370 KOKE (now KJCE). On January 5, 1968, the station began simulcasting KOKE 1370's country format as KOKE-FM. (There is currently a KOKE-FM on the air at 99.3 MHz and 98.5 MHz, playing progressive country, but it is not related to this station.)

Because KOKE 1370 was a daytimer, 95.5 KOKE-FM allowed listeners with FM radios to continue hearing the station after sunset. The station called itself "The People's Choice, KOKE." At this point, KOKE-FM's power was 10,000 watts, able to cover Austin and its close-in suburbs, but still just a fraction of its current power.

=== Soft AC ===
In the early 1980s, the owners of KOKE-AM-FM decided to make a change. KOKE 1370 became KMMM, a Regional Mexican music station, while KOKE-FM switched to soft adult contemporary music as KLQT. The call sign stood for "Light 95," as in light music. In the mid-1980s, the station got a boost to 100,000 watts, the maximum power permitted for non-grandfathered FM stations. The current power has been reduced to 49,000 watts, but the tower height is now 1,306 feet (398 meters) in height above average terrain (HAAT), making KKMJ's signal equal to Austin's other major FM stations. KKMJ can be heard from the suburbs of San Antonio to Temple and Killeen.

In 1990, The Tremont Group bought AM 1370 and FM 95.5. The soft AC format was retained, while the AM station reverted to the KOKE call letters, airing an easy listening/adult standards format.

In 1998, Infinity Broadcasting, which would later merge into CBS Radio, bought KKMJ and its AM station, which became KJCE, airing a talk radio format. In 2004, KKMJ was named the "R&R Station of The Year" for radio markets between #26 and #100. KKMJ has a consistent history of being a top 5 rated station in the Austin Arbitron and Nielsen ratings.

=== Mainstream AC ===
In the 2000s, KKMJ began shifting from mostly Soft AC to a more uptempo adult contemporary sound. In late 2013, it dropped the "Continuous Soft Rock" description and began using the slogan "Better Music for a Better Workday." The syndicated Delilah evening show was discontinued in August 2014, with the 7 p.m. to midnight hours being programmed similarly to other dayparts.

In 2007, KKMJ and KJCE, along with Hot AC 94.7 KAMX were acquired by Entercom, when CBS Radio decided to leave the Austin radio market. (Coincidentally, CBS Radio merged into Entercom in 2017.) In 2014 KKMJ began occasionally airing "The Great '80s Weekend," similar to the previous '70s weekends.

=== Past programming ===
From 2008 to 2011, KKMJ aired a mix of adult contemporary and 1970s hits, called the "Super Songs of The '70s." On Fridays, from 3 to 7 p.m., the station would play only 1970s hits followed by Adult Contemporary music with Delilah, and from midnight until 7:00 p.m. on Saturdays, '70s Oldies were heard, followed by Delilah again. Then back to '70s Oldies from midnight until 7:00 PM.

On some Monday holidays, the '70s Oldies weekends were extended into the holiday. Around 2011, the "Super Songs of the '70s" stopped airing on weekends. KKMJ began calling its music "Continuous Soft Rock."

== HD Radio ==
KKMJ-FM broadcasts in the HD Radio format. A simulcast of sister station KJCE can be heard on the HD2 subchannel, and Classic country "95.9 Texas Country" is heard on the HD3 subchannel. 95.9 Texas Country also airs on translator station K240EL on 95.9 MHz in Austin.

=== Translator ===
Broadcast translator for KKMJ-HD3
Call sign	Frequency	City of license	FID	ERP (W)	HAAT	Class	FCC info
K240EL	95.9 FM	Austin, Texas	156299	99	335 m (1,099 ft)	D	LMS
