= WILK (AM) =

Radio station in Wilkes-Barre, Pennsylvania

Simulcast of WILK-FM, Avoca
- Wilkes-Barre, Pennsylvania; United States
- Broadcast area: Scranton–Wilkes-Barre
- Frequency: 980 kHz
- Branding: WILK Newsradio

Programming
- Language: English
- Format: News/talk
- Affiliations: ABC News Radio; WNEP-TV; Premiere Networks; Westwood One; Wilkes-Barre/Scranton Penguins; Penn State Nittany Lions

Ownership
- Owner: Audacy, Inc.; (Audacy License, LLC)
- Sister stations: WAAF; WGGY (HD2); WILK-FM; WKRZ; WLMZ-FM; WLMZ

History
- First air date: February 13, 1947
- Call sign meaning: Wilkes-Barre

Technical information
- Licensing authority: FCC
- Facility ID: 34380
- Class: B
- Power: 5,000 watts day; 1,000 watts night
- Transmitter coordinates: 41°13′42.3″N 75°56′51.7″W

Links
- Public license information: Public file; LMS
- Webcast: Listen live (via Audacy)
- Website: www.audacy.com/wilknews

WILK (980 kHz) is a commercial AM radio station in Wilkes-Barre, Pennsylvania. It is owned by Audacy, Inc. and airs a news/talk format. WILK is powered at 5,000 watts by day using a non-directional antenna. To avoid interfering with other stations on AM 980 at night, it reduces power to 1,000 watts and uses a directional antenna with a three-tower array. The transmitter is off WVSA Drive in Wilkes-Barre.

WILK is one of three simulcast radio stations in Northeastern Pennsylvania that call themselves WILK Newsradio, along with WILK-FM 103.1 in Avoca and WAAF (910 AM) in Scranton. Studios and offices are on Route 315 in Pittston.

"WILK Newsradio" has a weekday schedule with mostly local hosts. At night, the stations air nationally syndicated shows including Dave Ramsey, Coast to Coast AM with George Noory and America in The Morning. Weekends feature shows on money, health, technology and science. Weekend syndicated hosts include Kim Komando, Clark Howard, Dr. Michio Kaku and Art Bell Somewhere in Time. Some hours on weekends are paid brokered programming. Most hours begin with world and national news from ABC News Radio.

The stations also carries play-by-play sports including Penn State Nittany Lions football and basketball, as well as Wilkes-Barre/Scranton Penguins minor league hockey.

== History ==
On February 13, 1947, WILK first signed on the air. The first studios were located at 88 North Franklin Street in Wilkes-Barre. The station's original broadcast frequency was 1450 kHz, operating at 250 watts during its early years. In 1951 WSCR in Scranton moved from 1000 kHz to 1320, making it possible for WILK to move to AM 980 with a three tower array, increasing its power to 5000 watts non-directional by day and 1000 watts directional at night. It was an affiliate of the ABC Radio Network.

On February 6, 1954, the station signed on a television station, WILK-TV Channel 34. Because WILK had been a long-time ABC Radio affiliate, WILK-TV took the ABC television affiliation. That station merged with Scranton's WARM-TV to form WNEP-TV on Channel 16.

From the 1990s until 2005, WILK was the originating station for the WILK Radio Network. However, that distinction now belongs to FM sister station WILK-FM.
