= WKTK =

Radio station in Crystal River, Florida

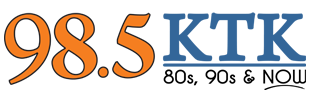
- Crystal River, Florida; United States
- Broadcast area: Gainesville–Ocala
- Frequency: 98.5 MHz (HD Radio)
- Branding: 98.5 KTK

Programming
- Format: Adult contemporary
- Affiliations: Premiere Networks

Ownership
- Owner: Audacy, Inc.; (Audacy License, LLC)
- Sister stations: WSKY-FM

History
- First air date: February 3, 1975; 51 years ago
- Former call signs: WRYO (1976–86)
- Call sign meaning: "Koast-to-Koast" (the station's signal extends from the Atlantic Coast to the Gulf Coast of Florida)

Technical information
- Licensing authority: FCC
- Facility ID: 18520
- Class: C1
- ERP: 100,000 watts
- HAAT: 299 meters (981 ft)
- Transmitter coordinates: 29.260°N 82.568°W

Links
- Public license information: Public file; LMS
- Webcast: Listen live (via Audacy)
- Website: www.audacy.com/ktk985

WKTK (98.5 FM) is a commercial radio station licensed to Crystal River, Florida, and serving the Gainesville–Ocala radio market. It is owned by Audacy, Inc., and carries an adult contemporary radio format, switching to Christmas music for much of November and December. In the evening, WKTK carries the nationally syndicated call-in and dedication show Delilah.

WKTK has an effective radiated power (ERP) of 100,000 watts, currently the maximum for FM stations in Florida. The transmitter tower is on SE 50th Street in Williston Highlands, Florida. The studios and offices are on NW 43rd Street in Gainesville.

== History ==
The station signed on the air on February 3, 1975. Its original call sign was WRYO. The station was owned by the Cape Christian Broadcasters of Florida, and it had a Christian radio format. It used United Press International for its news service.

WRYO was acquired by Entercom Communications in November 1986. The price tag was $3.6 million. Entercom chose the call letters WKTK for the station. They stand for "Koast-to-Koast", referring to the station's large coverage area stretching from the Atlantic Ocean to the Gulf of Mexico.

WKTK has been through various forms of the adult contemporary and hot AC formats over the years before finally settling into the mainstream AC sound it now uses. In 2021, Entercom changed its name to the current Audacy, Inc.

== WKTK-HD2 ==
On May 19, 2008, utilizing iBiquity's in-band on-channel (IBOC) digital radio technology, WKTK-FM began broadcasting its signal in both digital (HD-1) and analog (FM) formats. In addition to the digital launch, WKTK-HD2 began broadcasting the area's only all digital, all blues music format, branded as The Swamp WKTK-HD2 (98.5-2). The station was granted special permission to use "The Swamp" from The University of Florida in homage of the school's football stadium which is commonly referred to as The Swamp, Ben Hill Griffin Stadium at Florida Field.

On September 14, 2022, WKTK-HD2 ended its blues sound. It began simulcasting WRBD (1230 AM), an urban contemporary station in Gainesville owned by Urban One Broadcasting Network (unrelated to the larger Urban One). WRBD is branded as "Power 92.1", fed on FM translator W221DX at 92.1 FM Gainesville.
