= WOLX-FM =

Radio station in Baraboo, Wisconsin

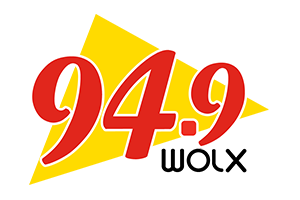
- Baraboo, Wisconsin; United States
- Broadcast area: Madison metropolitan area
- Frequency: 94.9 MHz (HD Radio)
- Branding: 94.9 WOLX

Programming
- Language: English
- Format: Classic hits
- Subchannels: HD2: Sports radio
- Affiliations: United Stations Radio Networks; Compass Media Networks

Ownership
- Owner: Audacy, Inc.; (Audacy License, LLC)
- Sister stations: WMHX; WMMM-FM

History
- First air date: 1947; 79 years ago
- Former call signs: WWCF (1947–1970); WLVE (1970–1984); WNLT (1984–1985); WILV (1985–1989)
- Call sign meaning: "Oldies" (former branding and format)

Technical information
- Licensing authority: FCC
- Facility ID: 60236
- Class: B
- ERP: 37,000 watts
- HAAT: 396 meters (1,299 ft)
- Transmitter coordinates: 43°25′40″N 89°39′14″W

Links
- Public license information: Public file; LMS
- Webcast: Listen live (via Audacy)
- Website: www.audacy.com/wolx

WOLX-FM (94.9 MHz) is a commercial radio station licensed to Baraboo, Wisconsin, and serving the Madison metropolitan area, owned by Audacy, Inc. The station airs a classic hits format, its studios and offices are on Ganser Way in Madison. WOLX broadcasts from a transmitter in Devil's Lake State Park near Baraboo in Sauk County, Wisconsin.

WOLX-FM broadcasts in HD Radio.

== History ==
The station first started experimental broadcasts in 1945 and was licensed as WWCF in 1947. It was the sister station to WIBU in Poynette, Wisconsin, which went on the air in 1925. At first, WWCF mostly simulcast WIBU. By the 1970s it separated its programming from WIBU, airing a beautiful music format, using the call sign WLVE meaning "Love". In 1984, it moved to soft adult contemporary as WNLT with the LT standing for "Lite Music". In May 1985, the call letters changed to WILV.

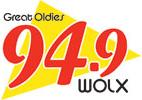
Logo for WOLX-FM as Oldies 94.9

On April 3, 1989, WILV flipped to an oldies format, initially concentrating on 1950s and 1960s music. Branded "Oldies 94.9", the station changed its call letters to WOLX-FM. The new format proved immediately successful; in the Spring 1989 Arbitron report, WOLX-FM jumped to second place among adults 25–54 in the Madison market from eleventh in the same period the previous year. In May 1996, long-time owner Shockley Communications, headed by Terry K. Shockley, sold WOLX-FM to Dubuque, Iowa-based Woodward Communications for $10.5 million.

In May 2000, Woodward sold all of its Madison stations – WOLX-FM, WMMM-FM, and WYZM — to Entercom for $14.6 million. As the 2000s progressed, WOLX-FM adjusted its format to classic hits, dropping the "Oldies 94.9" moniker in favor of "94.9 WOLX" and featuring primarily music from the 1970s thru the 1990s.

Syndicated programming on WOLX-FM includes Dick Bartley's Classic Hits, America's Greatest Hits hosted by Scott Shannon, and M. G. Kelly's Classic Hit List.

== Superpower status ==
As one of the oldest FM stations in Wisconsin, WOLX-FM operates at a higher effective radiated power (ERP) than would be granted today. It is a grandfathered "superpower" Class B FM station, operating at 37,000 watts from a height above average terrain (HAAT) of 396 meters (1,299 ft). Under Federal Communications Commission rules, a Class B FM station at the same HAAT would be allowed a maximum ERP of 6,700 watts. The station once used the slogan "High atop the Baraboo Bluffs in Greenfield Township". WOLX-FM's signal can reach 33 of Wisconsin's 72 counties, including those along the Lake Michigan shoreline on clear days, though reception is usually blocked by the Kettle Moraine hills northeast of Madison. The station can also be heard in the western suburbs of Milwaukee, in Sheboygan County, and in portions of Illinois and Iowa.
