= KAMX =

Radio station in Luling–Austin, Texas

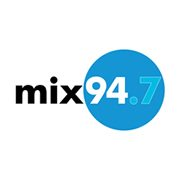
- Luling, Texas; United States
- Broadcast area: Greater Austin
- Frequency: 94.7 MHz
- Branding: Mix 94.7

Programming
- Language: English
- Format: Hot adult contemporary

Ownership
- Owner: Audacy, Inc.; (Audacy License, LLC)
- Sister stations: KJCE; KKMJ

History
- First air date: March 22, 1987; 39 years ago
- Former call signs: KAPT (1987–89); KATG (1989–92); KFGI (1992); KFGI-FM (1992–94); KPTY (1994–95)
- Call sign meaning: "Austin's Mix"

Technical information
- Licensing authority: FCC
- Facility ID: 48651
- Class: C0
- ERP: 99,000 watts (100,000 watts with beam tilt)
- HAAT: 398 meters (1,306 ft)
- Transmitter coordinates: 30.323°N 97.800°W

Links
- Public license information: Public file; LMS
- Webcast: Listen live (via Audacy)
- Website: www.audacy.com/mix947

KAMX (94.7 FM "Mix 94.7") is a commercial radio station licensed in Luling, Texas, and serves the Greater Austin radio market. It is owned by Audacy, Inc. and airs a hot adult contemporary radio format. The station has studios and offices on Westbank Drive, off Loop 360, near Westlake High School.

The station's transmitter is off Buchman Mountain Road in Austin, amid numerous towers for other FM and TV stations. KAMX broadcasts at 99,000 watts (100,000 with beam tilt), which is audible from the northern suburbs of San Antonio to Killeen and Temple.

== History ==
On March 22, 1987, the station signed on as KAPT. It was owned by Mark Grubbs, who also served as general manager. The station debuted with a hybrid top 40/country music format under the name "Capital FM," with the call sign spelling out "KAPiTal." (Austin is the capital of Texas.)

KAPT found little initial success against established Top 40 stations such as KHFI and KBTS (now KGSR). The station experimented with other formats including beautiful music, country music (during which it was branded as "The Country Kat" under KATG), oldies (as "Froggy 94" under KFGI), and dance/CHR (as "Party 94.7" under KPTY).

In 1994, the Amaturo Radio Group bought the station for $2.5 million. On October 24, 1994, "Froggy 94" switched to "Party 94.7", removing the only oldies station at the time in Austin. On September 1, 1995, Amaturo changed the station's format to modern adult contemporary as "Mix 94.7" with the call sign KAMX. In 1998, the station changed hands again, this time being acquired by Infinity Broadcasting. Infinity was later merged into CBS Radio.

Over time, KAMX moved from Modern AC to Hot AC. In 2006, CBS announced it would sell 15 radio stations across the country to Entercom, including KAMX. The ownership change became official on November 30, 2007. Coincidentally, CBS Radio merged into Entercom in 2017, with most of the former CBS Radio stations now owned by Entercom.
