= WLMZ-FM =

Radio station in Pittston, Pennsylvania

- Pittston, Pennsylvania; United States
- Broadcast area: Wilkes-Barre/Scranton
- Frequency: 102.3 MHz (HD Radio)
- Branding: La Mega 102.3

Programming
- Language: Spanish
- Format: Tropical music
- Subchannels: HD2: Channel Q, HD3:Urban Contemporary "The Diamond"

Ownership
- Owner: Audacy, Inc.; (Audacy License, LLC)
- Sister stations: WAAF; WGGY; WILK; WILK-FM; WKRZ; WLMZ

History
- First air date: 1983
- Former call signs: WTLQ (1983–1993); WSKS (1993–1994); WWSH (1994–1998); WILK-FM (1998); WSHG (1998–2001); WUBZ (2001); WBZJ (2001–2002); WDMT (2002–2013); WHBS (2013–2015); WMQX (2015–2023)
- Call sign meaning: "La Mega"

Technical information
- Licensing authority: FCC
- Facility ID: 22925
- Class: A
- ERP: 5,800 watts (analog); 99 watts (digital)
- HAAT: 22 meters (72 ft)
- Transmitter coordinates: 41°18′20.3″N 75°45′36.7″W
- Repeater: 1300 WLMZ (West Hazleton)

Links
- Public license information: Public file; LMS
- Webcast: Listen live (via Audacy)
- Website: www.audacy.com/lamega1023

WLMZ-FM (102.3 MHz, "La Mega 102.3") is a commercial radio station licensed to serve Pittston, Pennsylvania. The station is owned by Audacy, Inc., through licensee Audacy License, LLC, and airs a Spanish tropical format. Its broadcast tower is located near Dupont, Pennsylvania, at (41°18′20.0″N 75°45′37.0″W). Its programming is also simulcast on WLMZ (1300 AM) in West Hazleton.

WLMZ-FM uses HD Radio and broadcasts Audacy's LGBTQ talk and dance music service branded as "Channel Q" on its HD2 subchannel.

== History ==
The station signed on for the first time in 1983 as WTLQ, a CHR station branded as "Q102". It would later change its calls to WSKS in 1993, then to WWSH in 1994. After briefly holding the WILK-FM callsign in 1998, the calls would later switch to WSHG that same year. In 2001, the calls would switch to WUBZ, then WBZJ that same year.

In 2002, WBZJ flipped to an adult album alternative format branded as "102.3 the Mountain". It would soon change its calls to WDMT soon after.

In 2013, WDMT flipped to sports as "102.3 The Sports Hub".

On April 10, 2015, at 7 a.m., after dropping the sports format and stunting with random people counting up to 5000, WHBS flipped to a rock-leaning adult contemporary format as "Max 102", with the call letters changing to WMQX. The first song on Max 102 was "Sweet Child o' Mine" by Guns N’ Roses. The format would later shift to classic hits a few years later.

On October 13, 2023, WMQX flipped to a Spanish tropical format, branded "La Mega 102.3" and simulcasting on WODS (1300 AM) in West Hazleton. "La Mega" had previously aired on the second HD Radio channel of WGGY and on two FM translators.

The station changed its call sign to WLMZ-FM on October 25, 2023.
