= WAAF (AM) =

Radio station in Scranton, Pennsylvania

Simulcast of WILK-FM, Avoca
- Scranton, Pennsylvania; United States
- Broadcast area: Scranton–Wilkes-Barre
- Frequency: 910 kHz
- Branding: WILK Newsradio

Programming
- Language: English
- Format: News/talk
- Affiliations: ABC News Radio; WNEP-TV; Premiere Networks; Westwood One; Penn State Nittany Lions; Wilkes-Barre/Scranton Penguins

Ownership
- Owner: Audacy, Inc.; (Audacy License, LLC)
- Sister stations: WGGY (HD2); WILK; WILK-FM; WKRZ; WLMZ; WLMZ-FM

History
- First air date: 1925
- Former call signs: WGBI (1925–2005); WBZU (2005–2020)
- Call sign meaning: "parked" call sign; see WKVB

Technical information
- Licensing authority: FCC
- Facility ID: 36200
- Class: B
- Power: 900 watts day; 440 watts night
- Transmitter coordinates: 41.409514°N 75.666854°W

Links
- Public license information: Public file; LMS
- Webcast: Listen live (via Audacy)
- Website: www.audacy.com/wilknews

WAAF (910 kHz) is a commercial radio station licensed to Scranton, Pennsylvania, owned by Audacy, Inc. WAAF airs a news/talk radio format, and transmits with a power of 900 watts by day and 440 watts at night, using a non-directional antenna at all times. Its transmitter is at the corner of Penn Avenue and Spruce Street, on the Scranton Times Building.

WAAF is one of three simulcast radio stations in Northeastern Pennsylvania that call themselves WILK Newsradio, along with 103.1 WILK-FM in Avoca and 980 WILK in Wilkes-Barre. Studios and offices are on Route 315 in Pittston.

"WILK Newsradio" has a weekday schedule with mostly local hosts. At night, the stations air nationally syndicated shows including Dave Ramsey, Coast to Coast AM with George Noory and America in The Morning. Weekends feature shows on money, health, technology and science. Weekend syndicated hosts include Kim Komando, Clark Howard, Dr. Michio Kaku and Art Bell Somewhere in Time. Some hours on weekends are paid brokered programming. Most hours begin with world and national news from ABC News Radio.

The stations also carries play-by-play sports including Penn State Nittany Lions football and basketball, as well as Wilkes-Barre/Scranton Penguins minor league hockey.

== History ==
The station signed on the frequency of 1250 kHz in 1925, as WGBI. It was owned by Frank S. Megargee. In 1927, the station moved to 1300 kHz, which it time shared with Scranton's other radio station, WQAN (now WEJL). The two stations, which were time sharing a single frequency, moved to 880 kHz in 1931, and then again to 910 kHz by 1941 (the later move, forced by a nationwide frequency reassignment, took place in 1941). WGBI remained on 910 kHz when WQAN moved on to its own broadcast tower and new frequency of 630 kHz in 1948. This meant that WGBI had full-time use of 910 kHz, where it remains to this day. WGBI was a CBS radio network affiliate by the 1940s.

The Megargee family's company, Scranton Broadcasters, put an FM station on the air (now WGGY) and Northeastern Pennsylvania's second television station (now WYOU). The Megargees held on to the radio stations well into the 1990s. By the turn of the century, WGBI had been sold to Entercom (now Audacy) and become a repeater of WILK, existing mainly to improve its signal in Scranton. While WILK's daytime signal easily covers most of Scranton, the northern portion of the city only gets a grade B signal. At night, WILK must reduce power to 1,000 watts, leaving most of Scranton with only a grade B signal.

In 2005, Entercom flipped a station in the Madison, Wisconsin, area to adult hits; the callsign WBZU was parked in Scranton, ending 80 years as WGBI.

In 2007, the station moved its transmitter to the tower location atop the Times Building at 149 Penn Avenue in downtown Scranton also being used by WEJL's transmitter. The full-time switch over to the new transmitter facility and tower location happened on August 2, 2007. This tower sharing arrangement repeats an arrangement the stations shared over 60 years ago in their early history. The efficiency of the new transmitter tower location also caused WBZU to slightly reduce its power to keep within Federal Communications Commission rules on signal strength and coverage.

On February 26, 2020, the callsign WAAF was transferred to WBZU from 107.3 FM in Boston, which had held the call sign since 1968. When Entercom announced they would sell WAAF to the Educational Media Foundation, the callsign was "parked" in Scranton, preventing a rival Boston station from using the call sign and trading on its 52-year legacy in Boston (including 50 years as a rock station).
