= Peter Flynn (footballer) =

Scottish footballer

Personal information
- Full name: Peter Flynn
- Date of birth: 11 October 1936 (age 90)
- Place of birth: Glasgow, Scotland
- Height: 5 ft 7 in (1.70 m)
- Position: Wing half

Senior career*
Years	Team	Apps	(Gls)
19??–1953	Petershill		
1953–1957	Leeds United	1	(0)
1957–1966	Bradford Park Avenue	131	(9)
- * Club domestic league appearances and goals

Peter Flynn (born 11 October 1936) is a Scottish former professional footballer who made 132 appearances in the Football League playing as a wing half or inside forward for Leeds United and Bradford Park Avenue. Flynn was born in Glasgow in 1936 and played for junior club Petershill before moving to England.
