= WMMM-FM =

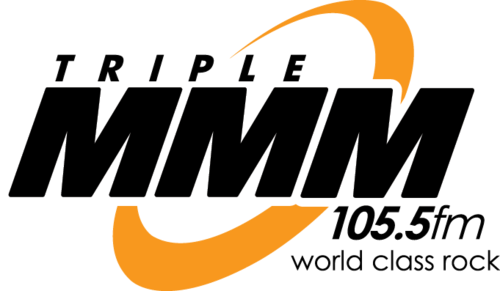
- Verona, Wisconsin; United States
- Broadcast area: Madison, Wisconsin
- Frequency: 105.5 MHz (HD Radio)
- Branding: 105-5 Triple M

Programming
- Language: English
- Format: Adult album alternative
- Subchannels: HD2: Channel Q

Ownership
- Owner: Audacy, Inc.; (Audacy License, LLC)
- Sister stations: WMHX; WOLX-FM

History
- First air date: July 4, 1991; 35 years ago
- Call sign meaning: Inspired by the Australian mainstream rock network Triple M

Technical information
- Licensing authority: FCC
- Facility ID: 73663
- Class: A
- ERP: 2,000 watts
- HAAT: 175 meters (574 ft)
- Transmitter coordinates: 42.959°N 89.490°W

Links
- Public license information: Public file; LMS
- Webcast: Listen live (via Audacy)
- Website: www.audacy.com/1055triplem

WMMM-FM (105.5 MHz) is a radio station licensed to Verona, Wisconsin, serving the Madison, Wisconsin area. The station is owned by Audacy, Inc. and runs an adult album alternative format as "105-5 Triple M." WMMM-FM formerly aired "The Studio M Channel," a 24-hour format of songs recorded from “Studio M” on its HD Radio subchannel (105.5-HD2). It has since started airing the company’s Channel Q network.

Audacy Madison Operations Manager, Chase Daniels, is responsible for programming WMMM. Jonathan Suttin, of Jonathan and Kitty in the Morning, is the Assistant Program Director and Music Director.
