= KJCE =

Radio station in Texas, United States

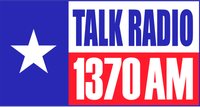
- Rollingwood, Texas; United States
- Broadcast area: Greater Austin
- Frequency: 1370 kHz
- Branding: Talk 1370

Programming
- Language: English
- Format: Talk radio
- Affiliations: CBS News Radio; Compass Media Networks; Premiere Networks; Radio America; Westwood One; KEYE-TV

Ownership
- Owner: Audacy, Inc.; (Audacy License, LLC)
- Sister stations: KAMX; KKMJ-FM

History
- First air date: 1948; 78 years ago
- Former call signs: KTXN (1947–58); KOKE (1958–91); KKMJ (1991–92); KFGI (1992–93)
- Call sign meaning: "K-Juice" (former station branding)

Technical information
- Licensing authority: FCC
- Facility ID: 1243
- Class: B
- Power: 5,000 watts day 500 watts night
- Transmitter coordinates: 30°18′16″N 97°38′53″W
- Repeater: 95.5 KKMJ-FM HD2 (Austin)

Links
- Public license information: Public file; LMS
- Webcast: Listen live (via Audacy)
- Website: www.audacy.com/talk1370

KJCE (1370 AM) is a commercial radio station licensed to Rollingwood, Texas, and serving the Greater Austin radio market. The station airs a talk radio format and is owned by Audacy, Inc. The radio studios and offices are on Westbank Drive, off Loop 360, near Westlake High School. The transmitter is off Johnny Morris Road, near Loyola Lane.

In 2015, the station began simulcasting on HD Radio, heard on the digital subchannel of sister station 95.5 KKMJ-HD2.

== Programming ==
KJCE has one local talk show, heard 7 to 10 a.m. weekdays. "Cardle & Woolley" features Jim Cardle and Lynn Woolley. For the rest of the weekday schedule, KJCE runs mostly nationally syndicated conservative talk shows, including Dana Loesch, Dave Ramsey, Sean Hannity, Michael Berry (based at KTRH in Houston), Joe Pags (from WOAI San Antonio), "Red Eye Radio" (based at WBAP Dallas) and "This Morning, America's First News with Gordon Deal."

Weekends feature shows on money, health, the outdoors, technology, home improvement and cars. Some weekend shows are paid brokered programming. Syndicated weekend hosts include Leo Laporte and Bill Cunningham. KJCE runs CBS News Radio at the top and bottom of the hour. The station also carries college football and basketball games from Texas A&M University.

== History ==
The station signed on in 1948, and held the call sign KTXN. It ran 1,000 watts during daytime hours only.

On August 28, 1958, the call sign was changed to KOKE. It mostly simulcast the legendary KOKE-FM Country music radio brand in Austin in the 1970s. (An FM sister station 95.5 KOKE-FM, signed on in 1968, not related to today's KOKE-FM 99.3.)

In 1991, it switched to a simulcast of the soft adult contemporary sound on KKMJ-FM, using the call sign KKMJ.

In 1992, the station rebranded as "K-Juice 1370," with the call letters changing to KJCE. KJCE's new format originally consisted exclusively of satellite-delivered soul oldies. In 1996, under new program and news director Benjamin Bryant, it switched to a mix of satellite-delivered urban adult contemporary music with limited local news, public service, and sports programming. At that point, KJCE first began broadcasting Texas A&M football games. In 1997, Bryant received two Paul R. Ellis Media Awards from the American Heart Association of Texas for KJCE's coverage of heart disease and stroke risk in Austin's most vulnerable communities.

KJCE became a talk station in 2002. The station formerly simulcast on the HD3 subchannel of sister station KKMJ-FM "Majic 95.5" as well as FM translator K242CC at 96.3 MHz. On July 29, 2013, both outlets dropped KJCE. In 2015, KJCE's talk programming returned to the HD2 subchannel of 95.5 KKMJ.
