= WKRZ =

- Freeland, Pennsylvania; United States
- Broadcast area: Wilkes-Barre - Scranton - Northeastern Pennsylvania
- Frequency: 98.5 MHz (HD Radio)
- Branding: 98.5 KRZ

Programming
- Language: English
- Format: Contemporary hit radio
- Subchannels: HD2: Country music (WGGY); HD3: Family Life Network
- Affiliations: Premiere Networks

Ownership
- Owner: Audacy, Inc.; (Audacy License, LLC)
- Sister stations: WAAF; WGGY (HD2); WILK; WILK-FM; WLMZ-FM; WLMZ

History
- First air date: 1948
- Former call signs: WBRE-FM (1948–1980)

Technical information
- Licensing authority: FCC
- Facility ID: 34379
- Class: B
- ERP: 8,700 watts (analog); 348 watts (digital)
- HAAT: 357 meters (1,171 ft)
- Transmitter coordinates: 41°11′56.3″N 75°49′4.7″W
- Translators: 103.9 W280FJ (Bloomsburg); HD3: 92.5 W223CC (Wilkes-Barre); HD3: 97.5 W248BP (Scranton)
- Repeater: 107.9 WKRF (Tobyhanna)

Links
- Public license information: Public file; LMS
- Webcast: Listen live (via Audacy)
- Website: www.audacy.com/985krz

WKRZ (98.5 FM, "98.5 KRZ") is a commercial radio station licensed to Freeland, Pennsylvania, and serving the Wilkes-Barre - Scranton - Northeastern Pennsylvania radio market. It has aired a contemporary hit radio format since 1980. The station is owned by Audacy, Inc., through licensee Audacy License, LLC.

WKRZ has an effective radiated power (ERP) of 8,700 watts. The station broadcasts using HD Radio; the country music programming of sister station WGGY (Froggy 101) is heard on its HD2 digital subchannel and Family Life Network is heard on its HD3 digital subchannel. The transmitter tower is located in Bear Creek Township at (41°11′56.0″N 75°49′5.0″W). WKRZ programming is simulcast on WKRF (107.9 FM) in Tobyhanna, serving the Stroudsburg area of Pennsylvania and New Jersey.

== History ==
The station first signed on in 1948. The call sign was WBRE-FM, originally licensed to Wilkes-Barre. It was the sister station to WBRE (1480 AM, now WYCK). The WBRE call letters stood for Baltimore Radio Exchange for the original owner, the Baltimore family, and not Wilkes-Barre like commonly thought. WBRE-AM-FM evolved through a number of radio formats and by the 1970s, was all-news radio. At first, the stations used NBC's NIS (News and Information Service). When that was discontinued, it ran the all-news format with its own staff. WBRE-FM, up to that point, broadcast in FM mono since its start in 1948. The station's audience was loyal but the ratings were not great.

WBRE-FM made a big change in 1980, when it was sold. The new owners added FM stereo, along with a format switch to contemporary hit radio music, and with the call sign change to the present WKRZ. WKRZ has been a contemporary hit radio station since 1980, branded at first as 98½ FM KRZ. The station was sold in 1999 to Entercom Communications.

Entercom received Federal Communications Commission (FCC) approval in 2003 to move co-owned WAMT (103.1 FM, now WILK-FM) from Freeland to Avoca. As a condition of the move, Entercom agreed to change the city of license of WKRZ from Wilkes-Barre to Freeland due to FCC concerns about the "loss of local service" to Freeland because of the WAMT move. In practice, the only change was the legal station identification. The studios remained in Wilkes-Barre and the transmitter remains in Bear Creek Township.

== Stations ==
One full-power station simulcasts the programming of WKRZ:

Call sign	Frequency	City of license	Facility ID	ERP W	Height m (ft)	Class	Transmitter coordinates	Service contour
WKRF	107.9 FM	Tobyhanna, Pennsylvania	14643	830	267.7 meters (878 ft)	A	41°02′39.6″N 75°22′37.7″W	Covers Stroudsburg, Pennsylvania

This station was originally assigned the WPMR call sign on November 29, 1989. The call sign was changed to WPMR-FM on March 11, 1992 and was off the air but began a simulcast of WKRZ in 1995. Its call sign was changed to WKRF on May 15, 1995.

== Signal note ==
WKRZ is short-spaced to WYCR Rocky 98.5 (licensed to serve York-Hanover, Pennsylvania) as they operate on the same channel and the distance between the stations' transmitters is 110 miles as determined by FCC rules. The minimum distance between two Class B stations operating on the same channel according to current FCC rules is 150 miles.

== See also ==
- Media in the Lehigh Valley
