= Radio Q =

Romanian LGBTQ online radio station

Radio Q logo

Radio Q (Q standing for queer) is an online radio station serving Romania's LGBT and queer community. The radio station was established under the name 2G Radio on December 18, 2005. It is affiliated to the gay portal GayOne.ro, which was previously named 2G. Radio Q is the first LGBT radio station in Romania.

Radio Q broadcasts non-stop through its Internet streaming service, the bulk of its broadcasts consisting of music of varying genres (with a focus on electronic music and trance). There are also a variety of programmes that discuss LGBT culture and rights in Romania, and these are archived on the website so that they can be downloaded after they have initially been broadcast. In the future, Radio Q intends to develop into an FM radio station so that its broadcasts can be received without using the Internet.
