= WLMZ (AM) =

Radio station in West Hazleton, Pennsylvania

Simulcast of WLMZ-FM, Pittston
- West Hazleton, Pennsylvania; United States
- Broadcast area: Scranton/Wilkes-Barre/Hazleton
- Frequency: 1300 kHz
- Branding: La Mega 102.3

Programming
- Language: Spanish
- Format: Tropical music

Ownership
- Owner: Audacy, Inc.; (Audacy License, LLC)
- Sister stations: WAAF; WGGY (HD2); WILK; WILK-FM; WKRZ; WLMZ-FM

History
- First air date: 1982
- Former call signs: WYLV (1981–1982); WWKC (1982–1983); WXPX (1983–1996); WILP (1996–2001); WOGY (2001–2005); WKZN (2005–2020); WODS (2020–2023)
- Call sign meaning: "La Mega"

Technical information
- Licensing authority: FCC
- Facility ID: 22667
- Class: B
- Power: 5,000 watts day; 500 watts night
- Transmitter coordinates: 40.939928°N 76.001447°W

Links
- Public license information: Public file; LMS
- Webcast: Listen live (via Audacy)
- Website: www.audacy.com/lamega1023

WLMZ (1300 kHz) is a commercial AM broadcasting radio station licensed to West Hazleton, Pennsylvania. It is owned by Audacy, Inc. and airs a Spanish tropical format in a simulcast with WLMZ-FM 102.3 from Pittston. WLMZ has a power of 5,000 watts daytime with a directional antenna signal pattern focused towards the north, then switches to a power of 500 watts at night with another directional signal pattern focused towards the northeast. WLMZ is considered a Class B station according to the Federal Communications Commission.

Until October 13, 2023, the then-WODS was one of four simulcast radio stations in Northeastern Pennsylvania that called themselves WILK Newsradio, along with WILK-FM 103.1 in Avoca, WILK (980 AM) in Wilkes-Barre and WAAF (910 AM) in Scranton. Studios and offices are on Route 315 in Pittston.

== History ==
=== Prior use of 1300 kHz in Hazleton ===
The first station at 1300 kHz in the Hazleton area operated from October 26, 1961, to January 14, 1965, as WTHT, which became WHZN in 1964. Broadcasting from studios and a transmitter southeast of Hazleton, the station experienced a turbulent final year which included a license renewal designated for hearing, financial problems, and a union strike which prompted the station to go off air for good. An attempt to reactivate the frequency in the late 1960s and early 1970s failed due to its specification of West Hazleton as the city of license despite not covering it completely.

=== Current license ===
The current station on 1300 kHz signed on in 1982 with the call sign WWKC, branded as "KC Country", with a country music format. At the time, it only broadcast with 500 watts of power and was a daytimer station, required to sign-off at sunset each day. It was only the second AM station to serve the Hazleton area. The country music format did not do very well in the market, so in 1983, the station changed to an adult standards format with the addition of some local news and talk. It switched call signs to WXPX, increasing its daytime power to its present 5,000 watts. The WXPX call sign lasted until 1996, when the station was sold and the format and call sign were changed to WILP, and joined the WILK News Radio network.

Another ownership change happened in 2001 when the station changed call signs to WOGY. The station was sold to its present owners, Entercom Communications.

The station's call sign was changed to WKZN in 2005, and to WODS in 2020. The WODS call sign was transferred from 103.3 FM in Boston, which had held the call sign since 1987. When Entercom changed that station's call sign to WBGB, it "parked" the WODS call sign on this station, so they could not be used by a rival Boston station.

WODS left the news/talk simulcast with WILK-FM on October 13, 2023, when it shifted to a simulcast of the newly-launched "La Mega 102.3" Spanish tropical format of WMQX. "La Mega" had previously aired on the second HD Radio channel of WGGY and on two FM translators. WODS changed its call sign to WLMZ on October 19, 2023, with WMQX changing its call sign to WLMZ-FM on October 25.
