= WILK-FM =

Radio station in Avoca, Pennsylvania

- Avoca, Pennsylvania; United States
- Broadcast area: Scranton–Wilkes-Barre
- Frequency: 103.1 MHz (HD Radio)
- Branding: WILK Newsradio

Programming
- Language: English
- Format: News/talk
- Subchannels: HD2: Sports gambling "The Bet"
- Affiliations: ABC News Radio; WNEP-TV; Premiere Networks; Westwood One; Wilkes-Barre/Scranton Penguins; Penn State Nittany Lions

Ownership
- Owner: Audacy, Inc.; (Audacy License, LLC)
- Sister stations: WAAF; WGGY (HD2); WILK; WKRZ; WLMZ-FM; WLMZ

History
- First air date: 1976
- Former call signs: WACM (1976–79); WQEQ (1979–96); WWFH (1996–98); WILP-FM (1998); WWFH (1998–2001); WBZH (2001–02); WAMT (2002–04); WFEZ (2004–07)
- Call sign meaning: Wilkes-Barre

Technical information
- Licensing authority: FCC
- Facility ID: 22666
- Class: A
- ERP: 6,000 watts (analog); 93 watts (digital)
- HAAT: 22 meters (72 ft)
- Transmitter coordinates: 41°18′20.3″N 75°45′36.7″W
- Repeaters: 910 WAAF (Scranton); 980 WILK (Wilkes-Barre)

Links
- Public license information: Public file; LMS
- Webcast: Listen live (via Audacy); Listen live (via Audacy) (HD2)
- Website: www.audacy.com/wilknews

WILK-FM (103.1 MHz, "WILK Newsradio") is a commercial news/talk radio station licensed to Avoca, Pennsylvania. Owned by Audacy, Inc., WILK-FM extends its broadcast range throughout Northeastern Pennsylvania with two full-power repeaters: WILK in Wilkes-Barre and WAAF in Scranton. The station's studios and offices are on Route 315 in Pittston, while the station transmitter tower is located east of Yatesville at (41°18′20.0″N 75°45′37.0″W). In addition to a standard analog transmission, WILK-FM broadcasts over two HD Radio channels with a sports gambling format on its HD2 digital subchannel, and is available online via Audacy.

WILK-FM has a weekday schedule with mostly local hosts. At night, the stations air nationally syndicated shows including Dave Ramsey, Ben Shapiro, Coast to Coast AM with George Noory and America in The Morning. Weekends feature shows on money, health, technology and science. Weekend syndicated hosts include Kim Komando, Clark Howard, Dr. Michio Kaku and Art Bell Somewhere in Time. Most hours begin with world and national news from ABC News Radio.

The stations also carries play-by-play sports including Penn State Nittany Lions football and basketball, as well as Wilkes-Barre/Scranton Penguins minor league hockey.

== History ==
The station signed-on in 1976 with the call sign WACM. Originally licensed to Freeland, Pennsylvania, the station aired a syndicated Top 40/soft rock radio format with some local news. From the late 1980s and into the early 1990s, the station switched to an oldies music format and was branded as Oldies 103.

The station's programming during this time period was simulcast on sister station WXPX (1300 AM). The simulcast relationship between the two stations continued to exist through 2023, even though both went through a number of call sign changes, format changes, ownership changes, and the 103.1 MHz FM allocation being moved to Avoca. The stations, now WILK-FM and WODS, both simulcast the WILK NewsRadio network until WODS moved to a Spanish tropical format in 2023.

On February 23, 2022, WILK-FM added The Bet, featuring programming from Audacy's BetQL Network, to its HD2 subchannel.
