= WFHB =

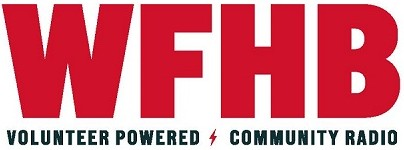

Bloomington, Indiana; United States
- Broadcast area: Bloomington, Ellettsville, Nashville, Indiana
- Frequency: 91.3 MHz
- Branding: Volunteer powered community radio

Programming
- Format: Community Radio

Ownership
- Owner: Bloomington Community Radio Inc.

History
- Call sign meaning: FireHouse Broadcasting

Technical information
- Licensing authority: FCC
- Facility ID: 5878
- Class: A
- ERP: 1,600 watts
- HAAT: 119.0 meters (390.4 ft)
- Transmitter coordinates: 39°1′18.00″N 86°36′5.00″W
- Translators: 98.1 (Bloomington); 106.3 (Ellettsville); 100.7 (Nashville)

Links
- Public license information: Public file; LMS
- Webcast: Listen Live
- Website: wfhb.org

WFHB 91.3 FM is a community radio FM station in Bloomington, Indiana, United States. The station has three translators serving southern Indiana: 98.1 in Bloomington, 100.7 in Nashville and 106.3 in Ellettsville.

WFHB has a small paid staff and over 150 volunteers, who perform a range of duties, from office administration to music and news programming. The station is supported financially by contributions from listeners and program underwriting by local businesses, as well as by community service grants from the Corporation for Public Broadcasting.

== Station history ==
The idea for WFHB began in 1974, conceived by Mark Hood, Jeffrey Morris, and Craig Palmer. They founded a 501c3 non-profit organization the same year called Community Radio Project (CRP) in order to establish a community radio station in Bloomington, Indiana. In June 1976, CRP organizers Mark Hood, Robyn Carey, and Jim Manion attended NARC II, the second National Alternative Radio Conference, held in Telluride, Colorado. NARC II was organized by the recently established National Federation of Community Broadcasters and hosted by KOTO, Telluride's community radio station, which had begun broadcasting in 1975.

Community radio organizers from around the US were in attendance and the CRP organizers became more aware of the nascent community radio movement. Upon returning from the conference, CRP began the process of applying for a Federal Communications Commission (FCC) license and raising the necessary funds. Nineteen years later, on January 4, 1993, following numerous applications and several court cases, WFHB began broadcasting on 91.3 MHz from their transmitter site in rural Monroe County, Indiana. In February 1994, station operations moved to a former city fire station in downtown Bloomington.

== Translators ==
In addition to its main frequency, WFHB is relayed by three translators to widen its broadcast area.

Call sign	Frequency	City of license	FID	ERP (W)	Class	FCC info
W251AG	(98.1 FM) FM	Bloomington, Indiana	5879	250	D	LMS
W264BP	(100.7 FM) FM	Nashville, Indiana	141820	27	D	LMS
W292DD	(106.3 FM) FM	Ellettsville, Indiana	141812	38	D	LMS

== See also ==
- List of community radio stations in the United States
