= Purple Radio (London) =

Coordinates: 51.5138°N 0.1424°W

England
- Broadcast area: Westminster
- Frequency: DAB: 11B DRg London

Programming
- Format: House, dance and pop music; gay and lesbian news and entertainment, live club broadcasts

Ownership
- Owner: Purple Radio

Purple Radio was an internet and British digital radio station for a gay, lesbian and gay-friendly audience. It was available on a DAB multiplex in London and also online. It was the first full-time gay and lesbian radio station and broadcast 24 hours a day, with live broadcasts from a different nightclub every night.

Purple Radio was launched in 2001 and merged with Gaydar Radio in 2003.

== Format ==
The station played a mix of dance and mainstream pop music, interspersed with chat and news. Live shows took place during the day, with Programme Controller Pete Flynn (who now runs SFM Radio) presenting the breakfast show at launch.

Purple Radio's unique programming came in the form of close involvement with London's gay and lesbian nightclubs. Early evening programming saw DJs introducing their favourite tracks to listeners in a unique mix of chat and music.

From 10pm each night the station broadcast live from a different nightclub, using ISDN codec including Heaven (nightclub).

The station was based above London's Hanover Grand nightclub, a grand nightspot which was later demolished to make way for a shopping centre just off London's Oxford Street.

Originally broadcast over the internet, the station was one of the first to start broadcasting on British digital radio station a short time after the BBC launched its first digital station

Purple Radio used the tagline "The Digital Soundtrack to Gay Life in London" and also "The World's Fastest Growing Radio Station".

== History ==
Purple Radio was launched in 2001 with the backing of Kelvin MacKenzie and Lord Waheed Alli, and was a part of a bouquet of services provided by the Digital Radio Group (then part of the GWR Group).

In 2003, to save costs, the station took the decision to merge with Gaydar Radio. Gaydar Radio eventually took the decision not to continue with Purple Radio as a separate output and put in a submission to the Radio Authority to take over Purple's frequency, and gained a DAB outlet on the London 3 Digital multiplex in 2004. Gaydar Radio then was taken on by Gaydio, which broadcasts in cities across the UK today.

== Notable presenters ==
- Pete Flynn (Programme Director)
- Cristo Foufas
- Terry Nunn (presented Terry's Top Tunes)
- Mark Young (the on-air name of Communications Manager Colm Howard-Lloyd)
- Nicholas Chistostomou (of club Coco Lattee)
- Simon Hobart (of club Popstarz)
- Jason McCrossan
- Steve Power
- Neil Veglio
- Tobyn Cleeves

== Purple in the Park ==
To help market the radio station, and to revive the dormant Summer Rites festival, the radio station launched a two-day music festival in 2002.

Acts for the 50,000 capacity festival included Grace Jones and Yoko Ono.
