= WGGY =

Country music radio station in Scranton, Pennsylvania, United States

- Scranton, Pennsylvania; United States
- Broadcast area: Wilkes-Barre; Scranton; Northeastern Pennsylvania
- Frequency: 101.3 MHz (HD Radio)
- Branding: Froggy 101

Programming
- Format: Country

Ownership
- Owner: Audacy, Inc.; (Audacy License, LLC)
- Sister stations: WAAF; WILK; WILK-FM; WKRZ; WLMZ-FM; WLMZ

History
- First air date: December 25, 1948
- Former call signs: WGBI-FM (1948–1993)
- Call sign meaning: "Froggy"

Technical information
- Licensing authority: FCC
- Facility ID: 36202
- Class: B
- ERP: 7,000 watts (analog); 280 watts (digital)
- HAAT: 365 meters (1,198 ft)
- Transmitter coordinates: 41°25′38.2″N 75°44′51.6″W
- Repeater: See § Booster stations

Links
- Public license information: Public file; LMS
- Webcast: Listen live (via Audacy)
- Website: www.audacy.com/froggy101

WGGY (101.3 MHz, "Froggy 101") is a commercial FM radio station licensed to Scranton, Pennsylvania, and serves the Wilkes-Barre-Scranton radio market. It broadcasts a country radio format and is owned by Audacy, Inc. The studios are on Pennsylvania Route 315 in Pittston.

WGGY is a Class B station. It has an effective radiated power (ERP) of 7,000 watts. The transmitter tower is on Beacon Drive in Clark's Summit, off Interstate 476. WGGY broadcasts using HD Radio technology. To improve its signal, WGGY is heard on three booster stations on 101.3 MHz around Northeast Pennsylvania.

== History ==
=== WGBI-FM ===
WGGY was one of the earliest FM stations in Northeast Pennsylvania. It signed on the air on December 25, 1948, as WGBI-FM, the sister station to WGBI (910 AM, now WAAF). At first, they mostly simulcast their programming and were owned by Scranton Broadcasters, Inc. The two stations were network affiliates of CBS Radio, airing the CBS line-up of dramas, comedies, news, sports, game shows, soap operas and big band broadcasts during the "Golden Age of Radio". As network programming moved from radio to television in the 1950s, WGBI-AM-FM aired a middle of the road format of popular adult music, news and sports, still as CBS affiliates.

By the 1970s, WGBI-FM began airing separate programming. It subscribed to the syndicated "Hit Parade" adult top 40 service. The station was mostly automated with a pre-recorded announcer giving the artists and names of the songs played, with weather and other info. Eventually live DJs were added. Around 1990, the station changed course, flipping to a country music format and calling itself "Froggy 101".

=== WGGY ===
In 1993, to reflect its moniker, Froggy 101, the station changed its call sign to WGGY, with the final three letters as part of the word "Froggy".

Froggy 101 received national attention through the NBC sitcom, The Office. A Froggy 101 bumper sticker was displayed on a filing cabinet beside Dwight Schrute's desk and at the reception desk.

In the early 2000s, programming on WGGY 101.3 was simulcast on WGGI 95.9 to give a better signal to listeners in the Columbia County area of Northeast Pennsylvania. On September 26, 2017, Entercom (forerunner of Audacy) announced a divestment of three stations (WGGI, KSOQ-FM and KSWD) to the Educational Media Foundation (EMF) as part of Entercom's merger with CBS Radio. It needed to comply with FCC ownership rules in the Wilkes Barre—Scranton market, as well as San Diego and Los Angeles. The FCC approved the sale of all three stations on November 2. The announcement stated that upon the closing of the acquisition, EMF would flip WGGI to its K-Love network which airs contemporary Christian music. Parent station WGGY 101.3 would remain unchanged. EMF changed WGGI's call sign to WKBP on November 16.

=== The Doc Show ===
For years, North East Pennsylvania was ruled in radio by one radio station, 98.5 WKRZ. Deciding to compete with their sister station, Froggy101 saw the opportunity to do just that. Doc Medek, former PD and midday host or WKRZ, was up for a contract extension. General Manager Gerald Getz decided to move Doc from his spot on KRZ, where he had been doing mornings for a year, to the morning spot on Froggy.

In 1999 Froggy launched a new morning duo, Doc & Polly. Lasting only a few months, they replaced Polly with Julie. Again, not long after the show started Julie left to go to DC. Program Director Mike Krinik and Doc decided to take a Top 40 approach to mornings. Doc pitched the idea of doing a show like WPLJ's Rocky Allen Showgram. Thus, the Doc Show was born.

In, 2000 the first version of the Doc Show was launched with Doc's co-host Kelly Green. The two would constantly let members of the radio station, promotional staff, sales staff, even receptionists join the show to get their take on topics. This created a morning zoo type atmosphere around the station garnering some buzz. Not long after the show started gaining traction in the ratings, competing against sister station (and Doc's old radio station) 98.5 WKRZ with their long standing morning show Rocky & Sue. Bringing in a cast of characters onto the show, McFly, Rusty Fender, T-Bone, and Joe Thomas the Doc Show moved their way up to second place in the ratings behind WKRZ's Rocky & Sue.

By the time 2004 came around the Doc Show was firing on all cylinders, and Kelly Green left and was replaced with Selena Robinson (then Janko). The listeners welcomed her with open arms as ratings continued to soar. Soon after in 2005, Program Director Mike Krinik left, and Doc was named Program Director. This allowed Doc to have more control over the show.

The next setback happened in 2006 when longtime producer/third mic Tommy McFly left his position of 5 years to head to D.C. Without a producer and third mic the Doc Show was on the hunt for someone that seemed irreplaceable. A few months after McFly left, Jake Navarro joined the show picking up exactly where McFly left off, producing sound bites, doing impersonations, stunts on the street, and anything the show needed.

The show flourished at this point, even beating 98.5KRZ's Rocky & Sue in the ratings for the number one spot. The Doc Show was unstoppable but then in 2010 everything would change when Doc would leave North East PA heading to Philadelphia to join Andie Summers on 92.5 WXTU and create their own version of the Doc Show. Doc would go on to win a CMA award for Major Market Personality of the year in 2013 and continued a successful morning show until 2016.

April 1, 2016, The Doc Show with Jessie debuted on Froggy101 both on air and on a Facebook Live Video. Many listeners thought this was a prank because of it being April Fool's Day and the abrupt departure of the former morning show "The Wake Up Call with Eric and Selena". Fans were torn missing their old morning show but loved that Doc was back.

In 2019, “The Doc Show with Jessie”, was a finalist for the 53rd Annual Country Music Association Awards. It competed in the "Medium Market" category. In 2022 Jessie left The Doc Show leaving three months of Doc doing his show solo.

On August 22, 2022, Froggy 101 birthed a new dynamic show, hosted by Doc (Ken Medek) and "Chewy" (Sean Medek), America's only father-son country radio morning team. In 2023 & 2024 Doc & Chewy took home Pennsylvania Association of Broadcasters Awards for Outstanding Local Radio Team. In 2024 the duo and the radio station each took home Academy of Country Music Awards. The morning show for Personalities of the Year in a Medium Market and Radio Station of the Year in a Medium Market. This marked the first ACM Award win for the radio station and the morning team. Also in 2024, the duo was nominated for a Marconi Award in the Medium Market Personality of the Year category. Since the duo started, they have vowed to bring radio back to how it was in 80s and 90s, "A fun, must listen, type of radio" is what they have stated they strive to do. The duo is constantly in the community, giving back hosting events every year such as the St. Jude Country Cares Radiothon, NEPA's Smallest St. Patrick's Day Parade, and their Thanks for Giving Food Drive, where in November 2023 they raised enough food for a Veteran's Food Bank in two days to be fed until the end of June 2024.

== Booster stations ==
WGGY's programming is simulcast on booster stations WGGY-FM1, WGGY-FM2 and WGGY-FM3. Until November 16, 2017, the programming was also simulcast on full-power WGGI (95.9 FM).

Broadcast translators for WGGY
| Call sign | Frequency | City of license | FID | ERP (W) | HAAT | Class | Transmitter coordinates | FCC info |
|---|---|---|---|---|---|---|---|---|
| WGGY-FM1 | 101.3 FM | Honesdale, Pennsylvania | 91317 | 50 | 7 m (23 ft) | D | 41°34′45.3″N 75°15′7.6″W | LMS |
| WGGY-FM2 | 101.3 FM | East Stroudsburg, Pennsylvania | 190777 | 2 | 254 m (833 ft) | D | 41°02′39.6″N 75°22′37.7″W | LMS |
| WGGY-FM3 | 101.3 FM | Hazleton, Pennsylvania | 203403 | 250 | 177 m (581 ft) | D | 41°58′9.3″N 75°57′26.7″W | LMS |
