= WSKY-FM =

- Micanopy, Florida; United States
- Broadcast area: Gainesville-Ocala, Florida
- Frequency: 97.3 MHz (HD Radio)
- Branding: Newstalk 97.3 The Sky

Programming
- Format: Talk radio
- Network: ABC News Radio
- Affiliations: Fox News Radio; Compass Media Networks; Premiere Networks; Radio America; Westwood One; WCJB-TV

Ownership
- Owner: Audacy, Inc.; (Audacy License, LLC)
- Sister stations: WKTK

History
- First air date: September 7, 1985
- Former call signs: WGLV (1985–87); WGGG-FM (1987–89); WLCL (1989–93); WRRX (1993–98)
- Call sign meaning: "Sky"

Technical information
- Licensing authority: FCC
- Facility ID: 23352
- Class: C2
- ERP: 50,000 watts
- HAAT: 150 meters (490 ft)
- Transmitter coordinates: 29°32′9.9″N 82°19′17.4″W

Links
- Public license information: Public file; LMS
- Webcast: Listen live (via Audacy)
- Website: www.audacy.com/thesky973

WSKY-FM (97.3 MHz) is a commercial radio station licensed to Micanopy, Florida, and serving the Gainesville-Ocala radio market. The station airs a talk radio format and is owned by Audacy, Inc. The studios are on NW 43rd Street in Gainesville.

WSKY-FM is a Class C2 station with an effective radiated power (ERP) of 50,000 watts. The transmitter tower is on SE 134th Avenue in Micanopy, off Interstate 75. WSKY-FM broadcasts using HD Radio technology. The HD2 subchannel formerly carried a Spanish Variety format known as "Tu Fiesta Radio." The HD2 subchannel has since been turned off.

== Programming ==
Weekdays on WSKY-FM begin with a local morning talk and information show, hosted by Bob Rose. The rest of the schedule is nationally syndicated talk shows. They include The Glenn Beck Radio Program, The Clay Travis and Buck Sexton Show, The Sean Hannity Show, The Mark Levin Show, The Dana Loesch Show, Coast to Coast AM with George Noory and This Morning, America's First News with Gordon Deal.

Weekends feature shows on money, health, real estate, law, gardening, technology and horses, some of which are paid brokered programming. Syndicated weekend programs include The Kim Komando Show, Bill Handel on the Law, The Erick Erickson Show, Fox Across America with Jimmy Failla, Somewhere in Time with Art Bell and Sunday Nights with Bill Cunningham. Most hours begin with world and national news from ABC News Radio.

== History ==
=== WGLV and WGGG-FM ===
The station first signed on the air on September 7, 1985. It broadcast at 97.7 FM and the original call sign was WGLV. It played adult contemporary music and was known as "Gainesville's Love 98." WGLV was co-owned with WGGG (1230 AM), a longtime popular Top 40 station in the market. WGLV tried to take advantage of the connection by hiring legendary WGGG personality "Boomer" Hough as its first morning show host. However, Hough's show lasted only a few months.

WGLV tried to further bank on WGGG's legacy. In 1987, it adopted a 1970s-based oldies format as WGGG-FM and declaring "The Legend is Back!" This, too, proved short-lived.

=== Clear FM, Go 97.7 and 97-X ===
After WGGG-AM-FM were sold in 1989, WGGG-FM became WLCL, a soft AC station branded as "Clear FM". For a brief period, the station programmed oldies as WGGO "Go 97.7"

From 1993 until 1999, the station was known as WRRX "97-X". It featured an adult album alternative (AAA) format which was partially programmed via satellite. Other times, it was locally programmed, featuring an eclectic variety of music. 97-X had a small yet loyal following in the local Gainesville music scene.

=== Sale to Entercom ===
WRRX was sold to Entercom Communications in March 1998. The price tag was $2.8 million. Entercom switched the call letters to WSKY-FM and changed frequencies to 97.3 MHz on June 7, 1998.

The new frequency allowed WSKY-FM to boost its signal to 13,500 watts from its previous 2,600 watts. The antenna height was nearly doubled to 948 feet (289 m) from its previous 495-foot (151 m) tower. This gave WSKY better coverage of the Gainesville-Ocala radio market, putting a high-quality signal over both cities. The station also switched to its current talk radio format. WSKY-FM has since boosted its power to 50,000 watts effective radiated power (ERP) but reduced its height above average terrain (HAAT) to 492 feet (150 m). In 2021, Entercom changed its name to Audacy, Inc.
