= West Hazleton, Pennsylvania =

Borough in Pennsylvania, US

- Borough
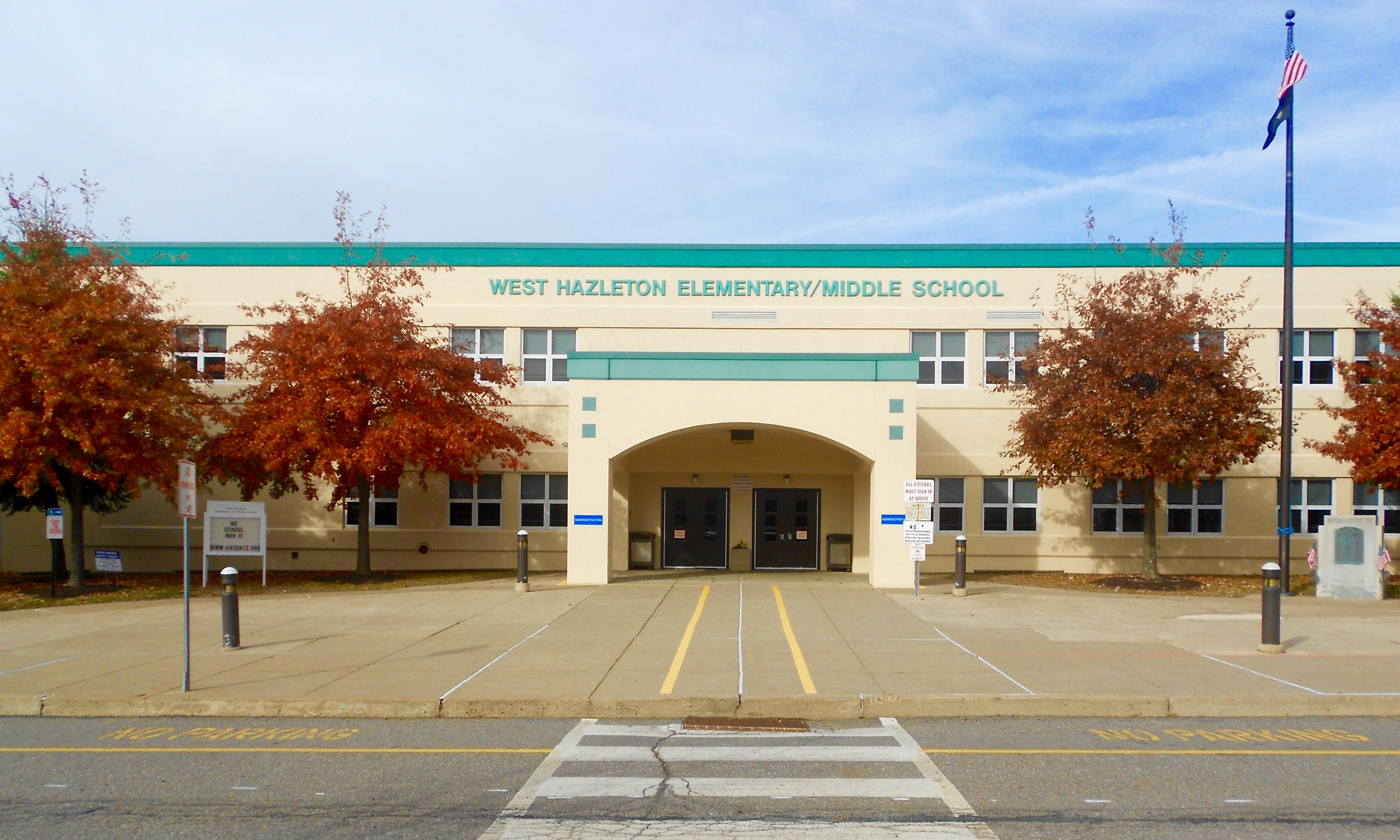
- West Hazleton Elementary/Middle School

- Location of West Hazleton in Luzerne County, Pennsylvania

- Location within Pennsylvania Location within the United States
- Coordinates: 40°57′42″N 75°59′56″W
- Country: United States
- State: Pennsylvania
- County: Luzerne
- Incorporated: 1887

Government
  - Type: Borough Council
  - Mayor: John Chura

Area
  - Total: 1.58 sq mi (4.09 km^{2})
  - Land: 1.58 sq mi (4.09 km^{2})
  - Water: 0 sq mi (0.00 km^{2})

Population (2020)
  - Total: 5,163 ▲
  - Estimate (2021): 5,160
  - Density: 2,758.3/sq mi (1,064.97/km^{2})
- Time zone: UTC-5 (Eastern (EST))
  - Summer (DST): UTC-4 (EDT)
- Area code: 570
- FIPS code: 42-83136
- Website: www.westhazletonboro.org

West Hazleton is a borough in Luzerne County, Pennsylvania, United States. The borough is 31 miles (50 km) south of Wilkes Barre and had a population of 5,167 as of the 2020 census.

== History ==
West Hazleton was founded by Conrad Horn, and it was officially established as a borough on March 12, 1887. West Hazleton gained prominence in the 19th and 20th centuries as an active anthracite coal mining community; it attracted thousands of European immigrants. The first burgess was J.W. McMurtrie; he served from 1888 to 1890.

The borough’s identity and economy were fundamentally shaped by the anthracite coal industry. During the late 19th and early 20th centuries, West Hazleton became a major mining hub, drawing a massive influx of European immigrants seeking work in the collieries. This population boom was dramatic; the town grew from a mere 191 residents in 1880 to a peak of over 7,300 by 1930. This era established the "patch town" culture that still influences the area today, characterized by tight-knit ethnic neighborhoods and community-centric organizations like the Pulaski Club.

Beyond industry, West Hazleton served as a regional center for recreation and sports. It was the longtime home of Hazle Park, which was once the premier amusement and social destination for the Greater Hazleton area. The borough also gained a brush with fame at Cranberry Ballpark, where baseball legend Babe Ruth once played. These landmarks, along with traditional church bazaars and social clubs, defined the social fabric of the borough during its most prosperous years.

As the coal industry declined following World War II, West Hazleton successfully pivoted toward manufacturing and commerce. The efforts of development groups like CAN DO, Inc. were instrumental in this transition, leading to the establishment of the Valmont Industrial Park. Today, while the borough remains a primarily residential community, it continues to serve as a commercial gateway for the region.

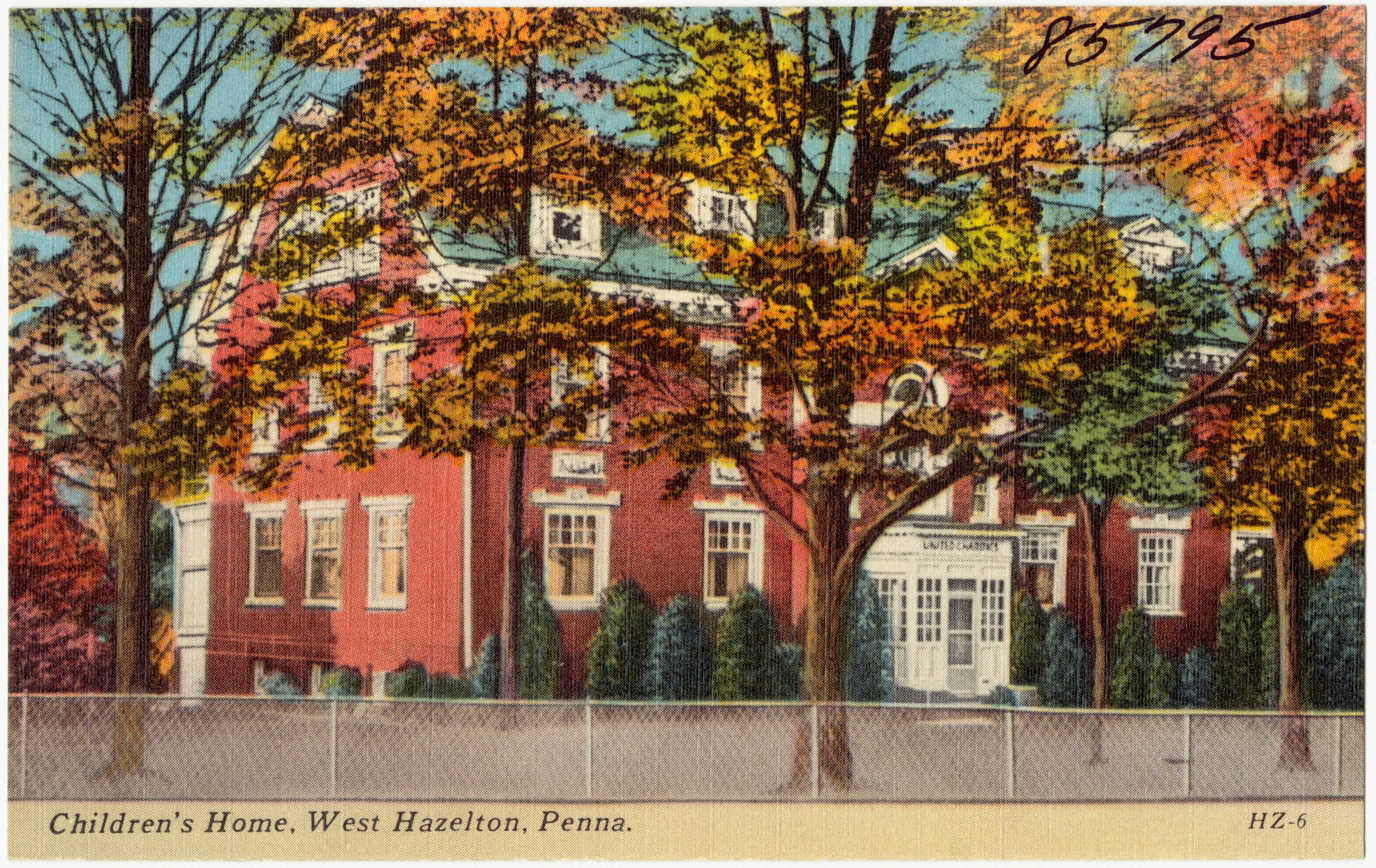
Children's Home, West Hazleton

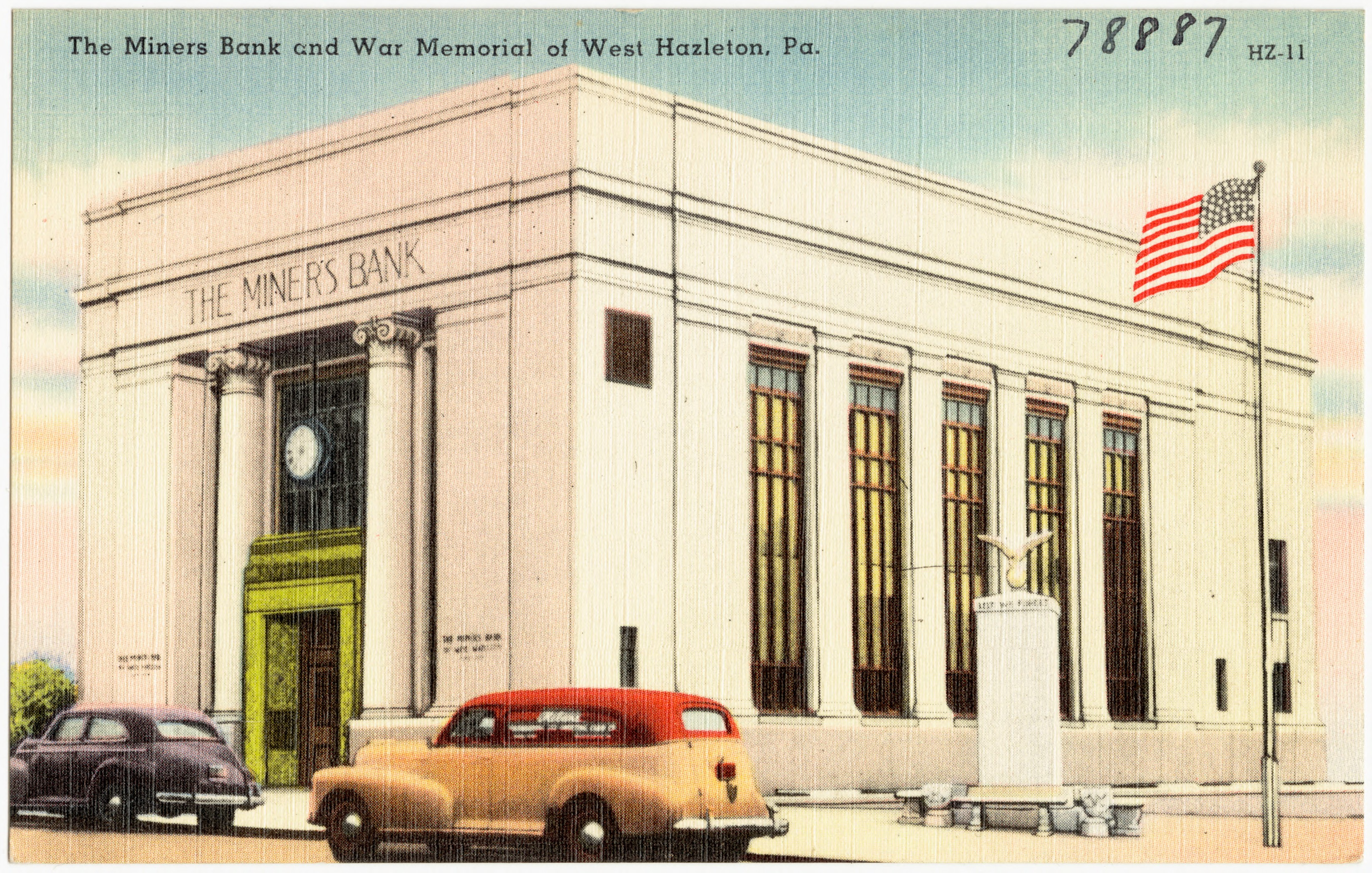
The Miners Bank and War Memorial, West Hazleton

== Geography ==
West Hazleton is located at 40°57′42″N 75°59′56″W (40.961651, -75.998915). According to the U.S. Census Bureau, the borough has a total area of 1.5 square miles (3.9 km^{2}), all land. West Hazleton is a small strip of land west of Hazleton City; it is mostly concentrated around PA Route 93. Interstate 81 runs through the northern section of the borough. West Hazleton is mostly residential; it also consists of two shopping centers, an industrial park, a movie theater, and a youth sports complex.

== Demographics ==
Historical population
Census	Pop.	Note	%±
1880	191		—
1890	931		387.4%
1900	2,516		170.2%
1910	4,715		87.4%
1920	5,854		24.2%
1930	7,310		24.9%
1940	7,523		2.9%
1950	6,988		−7.1%
1960	6,278		−10.2%
1970	6,059		−3.5%
1980	4,871		−19.6%
1990	4,136		−15.1%
2000	3,542		−14.4%
2010	4,594		29.7%
2020	5,163		12.4%
2021 (est.)	5,160	▼	−0.1%
U.S. Decennial Census

=== 2020 census ===
West Hazleton borough, Pennsylvania – Racial and ethnic composition Note: the US Census treats Hispanic/Latino as an ethnic category. This table excludes Latinos from the racial categories and assigns them to a separate category. Hispanics/Latinos may be of any race.
Race / Ethnicity (NH = Non-Hispanic)	Pop 2000	Pop 2010	Pop 2020	% 2000	% 2010	% 2020
White alone (NH)	3,418	2,834	1,834	96.50%	61.69%	35.52%
Black or African American alone (NH)	20	62	113	0.56%	1.35%	2.19%
Native American or Alaska Native alone (NH)	2	9	0	0.06%	0.20%	0.00%
Asian alone (NH)	8	15	22	0.23%	0.33%	0.43%
Pacific Islander alone (NH)	0	4	1	0.00%	0.09%	0.02%
Some Other Race alone (NH)	0	8	44	0.00%	0.17%	0.85%
Mixed race or Multiracial (NH)	15	38	50	0.42%	0.83%	0.97%
Hispanic or Latino (any race)	79	1,624	3,099	2.23%	35.35%	60.02%
Total	3,542	4,594	5,163	100.00%	100.00%	100.00%

=== 2010 census ===
As of the 2010 census, West Hazleton was 71.9% White, 3.1% Black or African American, 0.4% Native American, 0.3% Asian, 0.1% Native Hawaiian, and 3.4% were two or more races. 35.4% of the population were of Hispanic or Latino ancestry, up from just 2.2% in 2000.

As of the census of 2000, there were 3,542 people, 1,634 households, and 915 families residing in the borough. The population density was 2,281.0 inhabitants per square mile (880.7/km^{2}). There were 1,834 housing units at an average density of 1,181.1 per square mile (456.0/km^{2}). The racial makeup of the borough was 97.71% White, 0.56% African American, 0.06% Native American, 0.23% Asian, 1.02% from other races, and 0.42% from two or more races. Hispanic or Latino of any race were 2.23% of the population.

There were 1,634 households, out of which 21.6% had children under the age of 18 living with them, 38.9% were married couples living together, 12.0% had a female householder with no husband present, and 44.0% were non-families. 39.2% of all households were made up of individuals, and 18.6% had someone living alone who was 65 years of age or older. The average household size was 2.13 and the average family size was 2.86.

In the borough the population was spread out, with 20.3% under the age of 18, 6.7% from 18 to 24, 27.4% from 25 to 44, 22.4% from 45 to 64, and 23.1% who were 65 years of age or older. The median age was 42 years. For every 100 females there were 92.8 males. For every 100 females age 18 and over, there were 88.1 males.

The median income for a household in the borough was $28,765, and the median income for a family was $37,476. Males had a median income of $30,139 versus $18,400 for females. The per capita income for the borough was $16,525. About 7.3% of families and 10.0% of the population were below the poverty line, including 13.8% of those under age 18 and 11.1% of those age 65 or over.

== Education ==
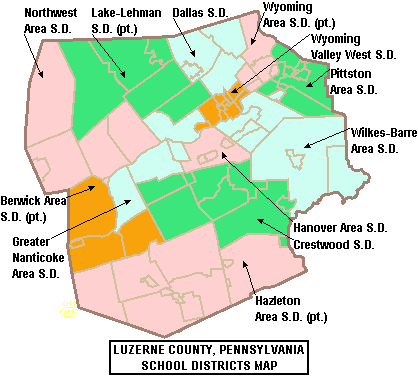
Hazleton Area School District is located in the southern portion of Luzerne County.

West Hazleton is part of Hazleton Area School District. West Hazleton Elementary/Middle School is located within the borough.
