= WMHX =

Hot Adult Contemporary radio station in Waunakee, Wisconsin

- Waunakee, Wisconsin; United States
- Broadcast area: Madison metropolitan area
- Frequency: 105.1 MHz
- Branding: Mix 105.1

Programming
- Language: English
- Format: Hot adult contemporary
- Affiliations: Compass Media Networks; United Stations Radio Networks; Westwood One

Ownership
- Owner: Audacy, Inc.; (Audacy License, LLC)
- Sister stations: WMMM-FM; WOLX-FM

History
- First air date: April 20, 1992 (as WYZM)
- Former call signs: WIMN (1991–92); WYZM (1992–2000); WBZU (2000–05); WCHY (2005–12)
- Call sign meaning: "Mix"

Technical information
- Licensing authority: FCC
- Facility ID: 73655
- Class: A
- ERP: 6,000 watts
- HAAT: 74 meters (243 ft)
- Transmitter coordinates: 43.222°N 89.300°W

Links
- Public license information: Public file; LMS
- Webcast: Listen live (via Audacy)
- Website: www.audacy.com/mix1051fm

WMHX (105.1 FM "Mix 105.1") is a commercial radio station licensed to Waunakee, Wisconsin and serving the Madison metropolitan area. The station is owned by Audacy, Inc. and broadcasts a hot adult contemporary radio format, switching to Christmas music for most of November and December.

== History ==
=== Country music/Classic hits ===
On April 20, 1992, the station first signed on as WYZM, owned by Janice and Ronald Felder. The station was known throughout most of the 1990s as country music station "The Big Y-105". The station was the first country FM competitor to WWQM-FM.

It became WBZU ("105-1 The Buzz") on November 20, 2000, launching a 1980s music format with a 5,000-song marathon without interruption. Over time, the station started to sprinkle hits from the 1970s and 1990s into its format, with an eventual emphasis on classic hits from all three decades.

=== Adult Hits ===
On May 5, 2005, the station became WCHY and rebranded as "105.1 Charlie FM" ("We Play Everything"), adopting an adult hits format very similar to the Jack FM-branded stations, with a wide-ranging list of popular music from the 70s, 80s, and 90s, along with occasional music from the 1960s and 2000s. In later years, "Charlie FM" would feature commercial-free weekday morning music blocks (8–11 a.m.) as well as "No-Repeat Work Weeks", in which no song was repeated for the entire 9 a.m.–5 p.m. Monday-thru-Friday work week. Aside from airing the syndicated Kidd Kraddick in the Morning show between March 2009 and May 2010, "Charlie FM" used no regular roster of live disc jockeys, with prerecorded voiceovers serving as the continuity element. (The WBZU call letters would be parked at 910 AM in Scranton, Pennsylvania.)

=== Hot Adult Contemporary ===
On September 4, 2012, at 2 p.m., after playing a half-hour of "goodbye"-themed songs (ending with *Nsync's "Bye Bye Bye" and R.E.M.'s "It's The End of the World As We Know It (And I Feel Fine)"), WCHY flipped to a hot adult contemporary format as "Mix 105.1", launching with Carly Rae Jepsen's "Call Me Maybe". (The station would change its call sign to WMHX on September 20, 2012.) In announcing the change, Entercom-Madison VP/Market Manager Michael Keck stated that "There is a hole in the [Madison] market for a station like Mix;" indeed, Madison had lacked a Hot AC-formatted station since WXXM ("Mix 92.1") dropped the format for progressive talk in 2004. "Mix 105.1" aimed to position itself musically between popular competitors WZEE (Top 40) and WMGN (AC) with a playlist emphasizing current musicians including Adele, Pink, Rihanna, and Maroon 5.

== Former logo ==
WCHY
