= Mass media in San Diego =

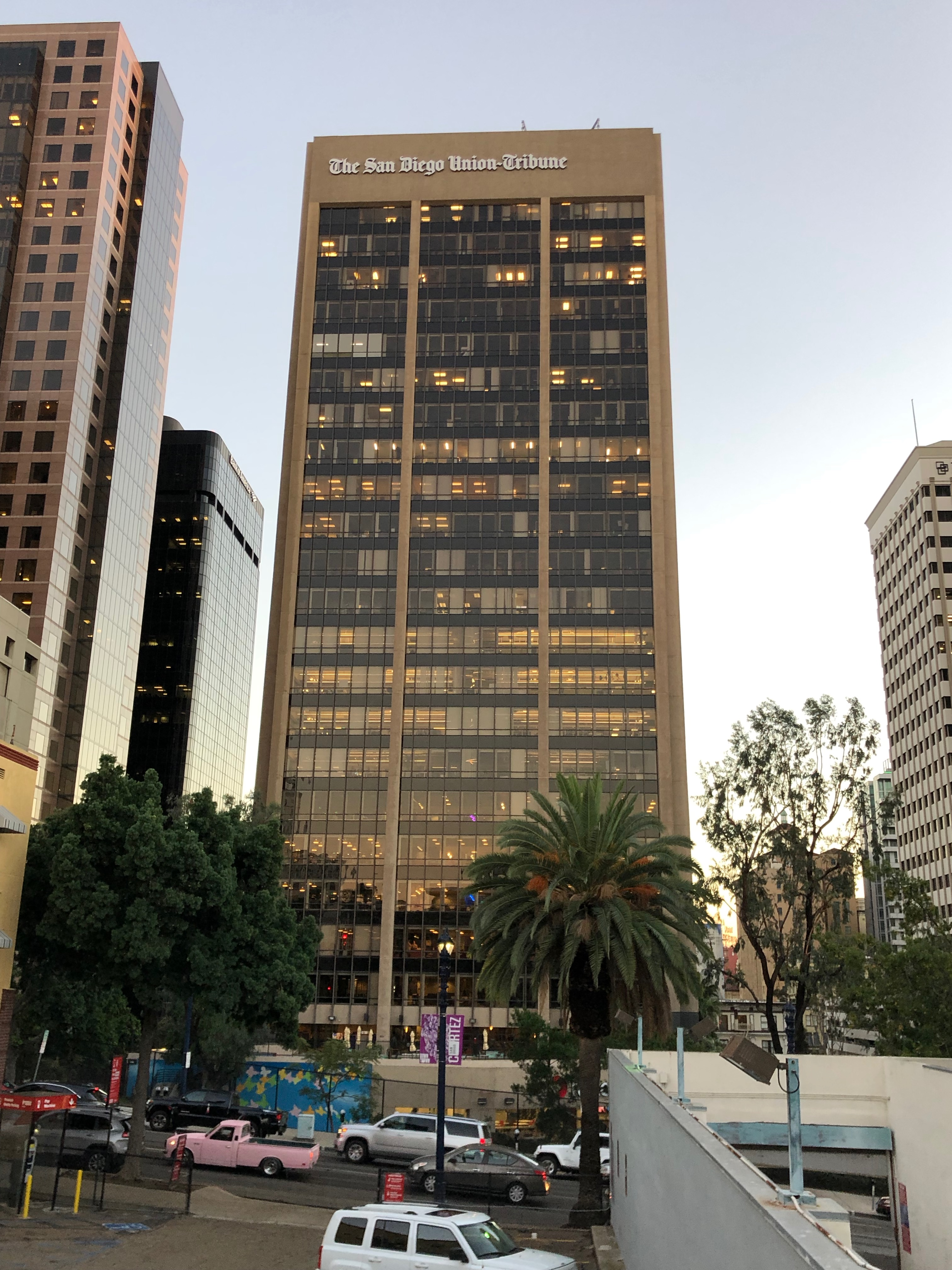
The San Diego Union-Tribune Building, 2018

San Diego is a Southern California city with a population of over 1.4 million; the San Diego metropolitan area has over 3.3 million residents. It has a daily newspaper and other print and online publications, and multiple TV and radio stations. As the city is adjacent to the Mexico–United States border, its residents are also able to receive media from Tijuana, Mexico.

== Print ==
=== Newspapers ===
- The San Diego Union-Tribune is the city's primary newspaper, published daily. The Union-Tribune was formed in 1992 through a merger of the San Diego Union (established 1868) and the San Diego Evening Tribune (established 1881). The newspapers had been under common ownership since 1901. The Evening-Tribune was the evening paper, while the Union was the morning paper; the Union-Tribune is a morning paper. As of 2015, the Union-Tribune had won four Pulitzer Prizes and was the oldest company in continuous operation in San Diego. In 2015, Tribune Publishing, which operates the Los Angeles Times and other major U.S. daily newspapers, purchased the newspaper in an $85 million deal. The purchase ended 146 years of private local ownership for the paper.

Other papers and news outlets published in the city include:

- La Prensa San Diego
- San Diego Daily Transcript
- San Diego City Beat
- The San Diego Reader is the largest alternative weekly in the city. Founded in 1972, the paper was headquartered in Little Italy before moving to Golden Hill in 2012.
- San Diego Business Journal
- The Southern Cross, the newspaper of the Roman Catholic Diocese of San Diego

Neighborhood newspapers include:

- Beach & Bay Press (Pacific Beach, Mission Beach and Mission Bay), published every other week
- Carmel Valley News
- The Clairemont Times
- The Coronado Times Newspaper
- La Jolla Light
- La Jolla Village News, published every other week
- Mission Times Courier
- Peninsula Beacon (Ocean Beach and Point Loma), published every other week
- Presidio Sentinel
- Rancho Bernardo News Journal
- San Diego Downtown News, published monthly
- San Diego Uptown News (Bankers Hill, Balboa Park, Golden Hill, Hillcrest, Kensington, Mission Hills, Normal Heights, North Park, Old Town, South Park, Talmadge, University Heights), published monthly

=== Magazines ===
Magazines published in San Diego include:

- Edible San Diego
- Giving Back Magazine
- Ranch & Coast
- San Diego Family
- San Diego Magazine
- San Diego Troubadour

== Online ==
Online-only media in San Diego include:

- Fresh Brewed Tech:
  Local tech news website
- inewsource
  nonprofit newsroom
- Patch
  National network of local news sites, with operations in San Diego
- San Diego Story
  Arts review website
- The Times of San Diego
  Web-based news outlet founded in 2014 that publishes daily local news for San Diego and the surrounding area. According to its own reports, the site had an average of nearly 600,000 monthly unique users in 2022. At the height of the COVID-19 pandemic in April 2020, the site reported 1.53 million unique users. Unlike some other local media startups, Times of San Diego provides full daily coverage of a large metropolitan area rather than only periodic in-depth articles. Its contributing editors have appeared on local radio programs and conducted training sessions for local journalists. From 2016 to 2019, the site was named "best news site" four consecutive years by the San Diego Press Club, and its editors won multiple other awards. The site received a grant from Google in June 2020 to expand coverage of the local impact of the COVID-19 pandemic. In June 2024, Times of San Diego was acquired by the nonprofit journalism organization NEWSWELL, based at Arizona State University, as part of an initiative to support local news organizations. (The group also acquired the Santa Barbara News-Press and the Stockton-based news site Stocktonia.) Following the acquisition, Times of San Diego editor and general manager Chris Jennewein said the newsroom expanded its staff and increased output to as many as 30 articles per day. In May 2025, the site incorporated sections from the San Diego Community Newspaper Group, bringing coverage from seven weekly and biweekly community newspapers into its website and related newsletters. This expanded its hyperlocal reporting within the region. In September 2025, veteran journalist Andrew Keatts was appointed editor and general manager, succeeding Jennewein, who remained with the site in a community partnerships role. Keatts indicated plans to broaden coverage with additional features and investigative reporting.
- Voice of San Diego (Voiceofsandiego.org)
  Non-profit news outlet in San Diego that reports on the city. A Web-only local outlet, Voice of San Diego was founded in 2005, one of a number of such publications that emerged around that time in responsive to cutbacks in traditional local print newspapers. The site is known for both its news coverage and local investigative reporting. The website is partially funded by grants, but is financed primarily on a paid membership model. In 2016, Voice of San Diego launched the News Revenue Hub, a pilot project aimed at helping other nonprofit news organizations adopt its model. Members of the pilot include Honolulu Civil Beat, InsideClimate News, The Lens, and New Jersey Spotlight. It has won a variety of local journalism awards from the San Diego chapter of the Society of Professional Journalists (for reports exposing corruption at San Diego Unified School District) and from the San Diego Press Club.
- Vanguard Culture
  Nonprofit arts and culture website
- Water News Network
  Specialized newsroom operated by the San Diego County Water Authority.

== Radio ==
San Diego is a principal city of the San Diego radio market. In its Fall 2013 ranking of radio markets by population, Arbitron ranked the San Diego market 17th in the United States. The market only covers San Diego County.

The following is a list of radio stations which broadcast from and/or are licensed to San Diego:

=== AM ===
- 540 XESURF-AM Tijuana (Spanish Christian)
- 600 KOGO San Diego (Conservative talk)
- 690 XEWW-AM Rosarito (Spanish talk)
- 760 KGB San Diego (Sports radio)
- 800 XESPN-AM Tijuana (Spanish adult hits)
- 860 XEMO-AM Tijuana (Spanish adult hits)
- 910 KECR El Cajon (Family Radio)*
- 950 XEKAM-AM Tijuana (Radio Fórmula)
- 1000 KCEO Vista (Relevant Radio)*
- 1030 XESDD-AM Puerto Nuevo (Regional Mexican)
- 1040 KURS San Diego (ESNE Radio)*
- 1090 XEPRS-AM Tijuana (Spanish Christian)
- 1130 KSDO San Diego (Spanish Christian)
- 1170 KCBQ San Diego (Conservative talk)
- 1210 KPRZ San Marcos (Christian radio)
- 1240 KNSN San Diego (Christian radio)
- 1270 XEAZ-AM Tijuana (Spanish talk)
- 1310 XEC-AM Tijuana (Spanish talk)
- 1360 KLSD San Diego (Progressive talk)
- 1390 XESS-AM Puerto Nuevo (Spanish talk)
- 1420 XEXX-AM Tijuana (Regional Mexican)
- 1470 XEHC-AM Tijuana (Spanish adult hits)
- 1550 XEBG-AM Tijuana (Bilingual classic hits)
- 1630 XECPTB-AM Tijuana (UABC Radio)
- 1700 XEPE-AM Tijuana (TUDN Radio)

=== FM ===
- 88.3 KSDS San Diego (Jazz)*
- 88.5 XHKT-FM Tecate (Regional Mexican and talk)
- 88.7 XHITT-FM Tijuana (Free-form)
- 89.5 KPBS-FM San Diego (Public radio/NPR)*
- 90.3 XHITZ-FM Tijuana (Contemporary hit radio)
- 90.7 XHTIM-FM Tijuana (Regional Mexican)
- 91.1 XETRA-FM Tijuana (Classic alternative)
- 91.7 XHGLX-FM Tijuana (Spanish Contemporary)
- 92.1 KARJ Escondido (Air1)*
- 92.5 XHRM-FM Tijuana (Rhythmic adult contemporary)
- 93.3 KHTS-FM El Cajon (Rhythmic Contemporary)
- 94.1 KMYI San Diego (Hot adult contemporary)
- 94.5 XHA-FM Tijuana (Regional Mexican)
- 94.9 KBZT San Diego (Alternative rock)
- 95.3 XHHIT-FM Tecate (Spanish adult hits)
- 95.7 KSSX Carlsbad (Urban contemporary)
- 96.1 KYDO Campo (Air1)*
- 96.5 KYXY San Diego (Adult contemporary)
- 97.3 KWFN San Diego (Sports)
- 98.1 KXSN San Diego (Classic hits)
- 98.9 XHMORE-FM Tijuana (Regional Mexican)
- 99.3 XHOCL-FM Tijuana (Spanish adult contemporary)
- 99.7 XHTY-FM Tijuana (Regional Mexican)
- 100.1 KKLJ Julian (Radio Nueva Vida)*
- 100.7 KFBG San Diego (Regional Mexican)
- 101.5 KGB-FM San Diego (Classic rock)
- 102.1 KLVJ Encinitas (K-Love)*
- 102.5 XHUAN-FM Tijuana (Electronic music)
- 102.9 KLQV San Diego (Spanish adult contemporary)
- 103.7 KSON San Diego (Country music)
- 104.5 XHLTN-FM Tijuana (Spanish Contemporary)
- 104.9 XHLNC-FM Tecate (Regional Mexican)
- 105.3 KIOZ San Diego (Mainstream rock)
- 105.7 XHPRS-FM Tecate (Spanish Contemporary)
- 106.5 KLNV San Diego (Regional Mexican)
- 107.3 XHFG-FM Tijuana (Spanish Contemporary)
- 107.7 XHRST-FM Tijuana (Spanish adult hits)

== Television ==
The San Diego television market only includes San Diego County. The city is the headquarters of the privately held Herring Networks, which owns the AWE Network and One America News Network cable channels.

The following is a list of television stations that broadcast from and/or are licensed to San Diego.

=== Full-power ===
- 8 KFMB-TV San Diego (CBS)
- 10 KGTV San Diego (ABC)
- 15 KPBS San Diego (PBS)
- 39 KNSD San Diego (NBC)**
- 51 KUSI-TV San Diego (The CW)**
- 69 KSWB-TV San Diego (Fox)

=== Low-power ===
- 7 KZTC-LD San Diego
- 9 KSDX-LD San Diego
- 17 KBNT-CD San Diego (Univision)**
- 23 KRPE-LD San Diego
- 26 KVSD-LD San Diego (Daystar)**
- 36 KDTF-LD San Diego (UniMás)**
- 43 KSKT-CD San Marcos
- 48 KUAN-LD Poway (Telemundo)**

=== Tijuana ===
- 1 XHJK-TDT Tijuana (Azteca Uno)
- 3 XHCTTI-TDT Tijuana (Imagen Televisión)
- 6 XETV-TDT Tijuana (Canal 5)**
- 11 XHCPDE-TDT Tijuana (Canal Once)
- 12 XEWT-TDT Tijuana (Las Estrellas Californias)
- 16 XETV-TDT Tijuana (Nu9ve)
- 19 XHUAA-TDT Tijuana (Las Estrellas)
- 21 XHTIT-TDT Tijuana (Azteca 7)
- 33 XHAS-TDT Tijuana (Canal 33)**
- 45 XHBJ-TDT Tijuana (Canal 45 PSN)
- 49 XHDTV-TDT Tecate (Silent)
