= List of San Diego Padres broadcasters =

The San Diego Padres are an American professional baseball team based in San Diego. The Padres compete in Major League Baseball (MLB) as a member club of the National League (NL) West Division. Below is a list of broadcasters for the Padres.

== Play by Play ==
- Jerry Gross (1969–1971)
- Frank Sims (1969–1970)
- Jerry Coleman (1972–1979, 1981–2013)
- Ted Leitner (1980–2020)
- Eddie Doucette (1980–1981)
- Rick Monday (1989–1992)
- Ken Levine (1995–1996)
- Steve Physioc (1995)
- Mel Proctor (1997–2001)
- Glenn Geffner (1997–2002)
- Matt Vasgersian (2002–2008)
- Steve Quis (2006–2009)
- Andy Masur (2007–2013)
- Mark Neely (2009–2011)
- Dick Enberg (2010–2016)
- Mike Pomeranz (2012–present)
- Jesse Agler (2014–present)
- Don Orsillo (2016–present)

== Analyst ==
- Duke Snider (1969–1971)
- Bob Chandler (1970–2003)
- Dave Campbell (1978–1988)
- Rick Monday (1989–1992)
- Mark Grant (1996–present)
- Rick Sutcliffe (1997–2004)
- Tim Flannery (2005–2006)
- Tony Gwynn (2005–2014)
- Bob Scanlan (2012–present)
- Mark Sweeney (2012–2023)
- Tony Gwynn Jr. (2017–present)

== Spanish ==
- Mario Thomas (1969–1997)
- Arnoldo Sanchez Fontes (1969)
- Gilberto Delgado Lizarraga (1971)
- Gustavo Lopez Moreno (1969–1992)
- Gustavo Lopez Estrada(1981–1991)
- Eduardo Ortega (1987–present)
- Juan Angel Avila (1998–2014)
- Carlos Hernandez (2012–present)
- Pedro Gutierrez (2014–present)
- Matias Santos Martinez (1992–1997)
- Rogelio Escobar Zaragoza
- Jesus Rocha Barraza
- Eduardo Valdez-Vizcarra
- Rene Mora (1999–2002)
- Homobono Briceño (2000–2002)

== Broadcast Outlets ==
=== Over-the-air Television ===
- KOGO-TV (1969–1970)
- KCST(-TV) (1971–1972; 1984–1986)
- XETV-TV (1977–1979)
- KFMB-TV (1980–1983; 1995–1996, 2025-present)
- KUSI-TV (1987–1994; 1997–2003)
- KTTY (1995–1996)
- XHBJ-TV (Spanish, 1991–1993)

There were no local over-the-air telecasts from 1973 to 1976.

=== Cable Television ===
- Bespoke broadcasts produced by MLB Network, simulcast on YurView California and other pay TV providers (2023–present)
- Bally Sports San Diego (2021–2023)
- Fox Sports San Diego (2012–2020)
- Cox Communications (1984–1989; 1991–1993; 1997–present)

- Channel 4 San Diego (1997–2011)

- Prime Ticket/Prime Sports West (1994–1996)

=== English Radio ===
- KOGO (1969–1975; 1977–1978; 2000–2003)
- KPGP (1976)
- KFMB (1979–1999)
- XEPRS-AM (2004–2016)
- KBZT (2017)
- KWFN (2018–present)

=== Spanish Radio ===
- XEXX-AM: San Diego, California/Tijuana, Baja California Mexico (1969–1994, 2024–present)
- XHEPF-FM: Ensenada, Baja California (2023-present)
- XEHG-AM: Mexicali, Baja California/El Centro-Calexico, California/Yuma, Arizona (2023-present)
- KURS (1999–2003)
- XEMO-AM (2004–2023)

== See also ==
- List of current Major League Baseball announcers
