= KPRI (disambiguation) =

KPRI is an American radio station licensed to serve the community of Pala, California, United States.

KPRI may also refer to:

- KKLJ, a radio station (100.1 FM) licensed to serve Julian, California, United States, which held the call sign KPRI from 2015 to 2017
- KLVJ (FM), a radio station (102.1 FM) licensed to serve Encinitas, California, which held the call sign KPRI from 2002 to 2015
- KLNV, a radio station (106.5 FM) licensed to serve San Diego, California, which held the call sign KPRI from 1960 to 1984
