= KLVJ =

KLVJ may refer to:

- the ICAO code for Pearland Regional Airport, in Brazoria County, Texas, United States
- KLVJ (FM), a radio station (102.1 FM) licensed to serve Encinitas, California, United States
- KKLJ, a radio station (100.1 FM) licensed to serve Julian, California, which held the call sign KLVJ from 1997 to 2015
