= KARJ (FM) =

Air 1 radio station in Escondido, California

- Escondido, California; United States
- Broadcast area: Escondido, California; San Diego, California
- Frequency: 92.1 MHz (HD Radio)
- Branding: Air1

Programming
- Format: Worship music
- Subchannels: HD2: K-Love 2000s; HD3: Radio Nueva Vida
- Network: Air1

Ownership
- Owner: Educational Media Foundation
- Sister stations: KKLJ, KLVJ, KYDO

History
- First air date: July 1966
- Former call signs: KOWN-FM (1966–1987); KWNQ (1987); KOWF (1987–1997); KFSD (1997–2001); KFSD-FM (2001–2003); KSOQ-FM (2003–2017); KYDQ (2017–2019)
- Call sign meaning: Air1

Technical information
- Licensing authority: FCC
- Facility ID: 49206
- Class: A
- ERP: 580 watts
- HAAT: 312 meters (1,024 ft)
- Transmitter coordinates: 33°6′39″N 117°9′13″W
- Translator: HD3: 98.5 K253AD (Oceanside)
- Repeaters: 96.1 KYDO (Campo); HD3: 100.1 KKLJ (Julian)

Links
- Public license information: Public file; LMS
- Webcast: Listen live; Listen live (HD2)
- Website: air1.com

KARJ (92.1 FM) is a non-commercial radio station licensed to Escondido, California, United States, and serving the North County of San Diego County. The station is owned and operated by the Educational Media Foundation, carrying the Air1 network of worship music, with transmitter in San Marcos near Frank's Peak on Mount Whitney.

== History ==
=== Country (1978- 199?) ===
This station began program testing in 1966, However, it didn't sign on until August 1978, when it became KOWN-FM. It broadcast a country music format known as "The Cow." In 1987, it became KWNQ, later becoming KOWF-FM, At this point, the station broadcast country music from local studios in Escondido.

=== Classical (199?-2001) ===
The callsign was changed KFSD while owned by the Astor Broadcast Group, who chose a format of classical music acquired from Lotus Communications in 1997.

=== Alternative (2001–2003) ===
In 2001 switched to an alternative rock format as Premium 92/1, still with the KFSD call letters. Station management admitted that the classical format has been in the red for years and the change was made to increase revenue.

=== Country (2003–2017) ===
In 2003, KFSD-FM was purchased by Jefferson Pilot Communications and turned into KSOQ-FM, the simulcasting partner for their popular country music station KSON-FM, which faced geographical challenges to its signal's penetration into the North County area of San Diego County as well as into southern Riverside County, problems largely solved by the addition of KSOQ. Fans of the alternative format were directed to listen to Lincoln's KBZT.

On December 8, 2014, Entercom announced that it would purchase Lincoln Financial Group's entire 15-station lineup (including KSOQ) in a $106.5 million deal, and would operate the outlets under a LMA deal until the sale was approved by the FCC. The sale was consummated on July 17, 2015.

=== Sale to EMF, Air1 (2017-present) ===
On September 26, 2017, Entercom announced a divestment of three stations (KSOQ, WGGI, and KSWD) to the Educational Media Foundation as part of its merger with CBS Radio (which locally owned KEGY and KYXY) to comply with FCC ownership rules in the San Diego market; the FCC approved the sale of all three stations on November 2. Upon the closing of the acquisition on November 16, EMF flipped the station to its Christian contemporary hit radio network Air1 at 1:00 p.m. that day. EMF also changed the station's call letters to KYDQ, the callsign is similar to repeater station KYDO.

On April 11, 2019, this station changed its callsign to KARJ, the new callsign resembles "Air1".

== HD Programming ==
Under its previous owner, an HD Radio transmitter was fitted to the station. The HD1 channel is the digitized standard signal as required by law. The current HD channels are listed below

- HD2: K-Love Classics
- HD3: Radio Nueva Vida simulcast
