= XHRST-FM =

Radio station in Tijuana, Baja California, Mexico

- Tijuana, Baja California; Mexico
- Broadcast area: San Diego, California/Tijuana, Baja California
- Frequency: 107.7 MHz
- Branding: Esteréo Sol

Programming
- Format: Spanish Adult Contemporary

Ownership
- Owner: Radio Cadena Enciso; (Gloria Herminia Enciso Power; Gloria Herminia, Maricel, José Enrique, Marcia, Claudia Beatriz and Laura Elena Jiménez Enciso)
- Sister stations: XEXX-AM, XEHC-AM

History
- First air date: December 1994
- Former names: Los 40, Más Flo
- Call sign meaning: "Rosarito", original location of allotment

Technical information
- Licensing authority: CRT
- Class: B1
- ERP: 10,000 watts
- HAAT: 109.15 meters (358.1 ft)

XHRST-FM is a station located in Tijuana, Baja California. It transmits for Tijuana and San Diego, California on 107.7 FM and is currently owned by Radio Cadena Enciso, known as "Esteréo Sol" with a Spanish Adult Contemporary format.

== History ==
The history of XHRST begins on 91.9 MHz in Rosarito, Baja California, but the station was promptly moved to 107.7 MHz. The station was initially operated by Grupo ACIR and aired several formats under ACIR, including La Comadre (Regional Mexican), Spazio (rock), and Estéreo Sol (English and Spanish adult contemporary). After Rosarito became a separate municipality, the station moved its studios to Tijuana on Blvd. Sánchez Taboada in the Zona Río and took on ACIR's Digital contemporary hit radio format in 2003.

On May 11, 2009, GRI Radio brought the Los 40 Principales format to Tijuana on XHRST. On October 13, 2009, Ya Párate, the Los 40 morning show, originated from Tijuana for the network. Grupo Audiorama jettisoned all Televisa Radio formats, including Los 40, at the end of June 2017, and it instituted La Bestia Grupera in Tijuana on July 17, 2017. The format lasted almost a full year until the station returned to Spanish CHR on July 9, 2018. On August 8, Grupo Audiorama returned the Los 40 format to the Tijuana and San Diego market.

Previous logo

On December 1, 2020, MLC Media took over operations of XHRST-FM and instituted the Más Flo format that ran on XHLNC-FM 104.9 under its management between December 2019 and April 2020; MLC had bowed out of that arrangement, citing XHLNC's social concession. MLC changed the format to Regional Mexican and rebranded the station as El Sol in December 2023.
