= XHA =

XHA may refer to:

- XHA-FM, a radio station (94.5 FM) licensed to Tijuana, Baja California, Mexico
- XHA-TDT, a television station (channel 36, virtual 10) licensed to Durango, Durango, Mexico
