= KNVE =

KNVE may refer to:

- KNVE (FM), a radio station (91.3 FM) licensed to serve Redding, California, United States
- KKLP, a radio station (91.1 FM) licensed to serve Perris, California, which held the call sign KNVE from 2015 to 2017
