= XESS-AM =

Radio station in Tijuana, Baja California

Currently silent
- Puerto Nuevo, Baja California; Mexico
- Broadcast area: Tijuana-San Diego; Tecate
- Frequency: 620 kHz
- Branding: PSN Radio Tecate

Programming
- Format: Spanish-language Talk radio

Ownership
- Owner: Primer Sistema de Noticias; (Media Sports de México, S.A. de C.V.)
- Sister stations: XESDD-AM

History
- First air date: May 4, 1954; 72 years ago on 1450 kHz
- Former frequencies: 1450 kHz (1954–2007)

Technical information
- Licensing authority: FCC
- Class: B
- Power: 5,000 watts
- Transmitter coordinates: 32°14′57″N 116°56′49″W

Links
- Public license information: Public file; LMS
- Website: psn.si

XESS-AM (620 kHz) is a radio station broadcasting from a transmitter in Puerto Nuevo, Baja California, Mexico, south of Tijuana. It is owned by Media Sports de México, S.A. de C.V., and broadcasts a talk format under the banner PSN Radio Tecate, aimed at listeners in Tecate currently off the air.

XESS is powered at 5,000 watts, using a directional antenna. 620 AM is a regional broadcast frequency. XESS shares tower space with sister station XESDD-AM 1030.

== History ==
On August 22, 1952, XESS received its concession. After a period of construction and testing, XESS signed on the air on May 4, 1954. The station broadcast to Ensenada on 1450 kHz and was owned by Fernando J. Rodríguez Sullivan. Radiodifusora de Ensenada, S.A. became the concessionaire on March 9, 1966, and in 1986, it raised its power from 250 to 1,000 watts.

In 2003, the station was moved to Puerto Nuevo along with XESDD. The next year, it moved frequencies to 620 kHz to reduce interference to stations in the United States and to improve its signal in both Tijuana and San Diego. Media Sports de México became the concessionaire in 2005.

In 2007, XESS became a network affiliate of ESPN Deportes Radio. That network ceased operations in 2019, with XESS then affiliating with Unanimo Deportes. However, by that time, XESS was also airing talk programming for the Tecate area, first as "Radio Frontera 620" and then as "PSN Radio Tecate" beginning in 2018.
