= XHBJ-TDT =

Television station in Tijuana

- Tijuana, Baja California; San Diego, California; Mexico–United States
- City: Tijuana, Baja California
- Channels: Digital: 27 (UHF); Virtual: 45
- Branding: Canal 45 PSN

Programming
- Affiliations: PSN

Ownership
- Owner: Media Sports de México, S.A. de C.V.
- Operator: PSN Primer Sistema de Noticias
- Sister stations: XEWW-AM; XEAZ-AM; XEC-AM; XEPE-AM; XHPRS-FM

History
- Founded: November 30, 1988 (concession); 1990
- Former call signs: XHBJ-TV (1990–2013)
- Former channel numbers: Analog: 45 (UHF, 1990–2013)
- Former affiliations: Nu9ve (1998–2004, 2012–2019); Canal 5 (2004–2012); Multimedios Televisión (2019–2022)
- Call sign meaning: BaJa California

Technical information
- Licensing authority: CRT
- ERP: 75 kW
- HAAT: 49 m (161 ft)
- Transmitter coordinates: 32°30′05.51″N 117°02′23″W

XHBJ-TDT (channel 45) is a television station in Tijuana, Baja California, Mexico, and serving San Diego, California, United States owned by Media Sports de México, S.A. de C.V. and operated by PSN Primer Sistema de Noticias.

== History ==
XHBJ's concession history began in the late 1960s with the initial award of the television station to Canales de Televisión Populares, a subsidiary of Telesistema Mexicano (today's Televisa). However, two parties objected to the concession award, which was announced in the summer of 1969: Tijuana FM, S.A., headed by Clemente Serna Alvear, and Mario Enrique Mayans Concha, founder of Cadena Baja California (now Grupo Cadena). In June 1971, the case was heard by the Secretariat of Communications and Transportation, and in January 1988, the SCT finally selected one of the objecting parties to become the concessionaire: Mayans Concha.

The concession was awarded on November 30, 1988, and Mayans set out to build Tijuana's third TV station and second UHF, after XHAS came to air in 1981. Transmitter tests began in the summer of 1989 and the station was on air by 1990, with a schedule of music videos and some local programs including, in 1991, 25 San Diego Padres road games in Spanish and adding Spanish play-by-play to ESPN and TNT telecasts of NFL preseason contests. The music video programming, an outgrowth of sister XHMORE-FM 98.9, came to dominate the station's output, and channel 45 was known as "MORE TV" during the 1990s.

Channel 45 began also adding blocks of programming to Galavisión, eventually becoming a Televisa local partner that exclusively rebroadcast network programming. From 2004 to early 2012, it carried the Canal 5 network, but in early 2012, Galavisión programming returned to XHBJ-TV, with Canal 5 moving to XETV, where it was broadcast on analog channel 6 and digital channel 6.2.

XHBJ lost Nu9ve—the renamed Galavisión—on November 1, 2019, to a subchannel of XETV. The station then rebranded as "45 TV Tijuana" and began airing mostly programming from Multimedios Televisión, along with the local morning and late evening newscasts of Canal 66 of Mexicali, and a simulcast of the program ¨En la Morening¨ from its sister station XHMORE-FM on Fridays. The IFT would then approve the addition of Canal 66 as a subchannel to XHBJ-TDT on December 2, 2020, though this was never used and expired.

== Technical information ==
=== Subchannels ===
Subchannels of XHBJ-TDT
Subchannel	Res.	Short name	Programming
45.1	1080i	XHBJ-HD	Main XHBJ-TDT Programming
45.2	480i	XHBJ-SD	Main XHBJ-TDT Programming

=== Analog to digital conversion ===
Due to the Mexican analog to digital conversion mandate, XHBJ-TV discontinued its analog signal on May 28, 2013. Tijuana was the first city where the analog to digital conversion begins in Mexico. However, due to penetration problems and impending local elections the other television stations restored their analog signals again two days after (to turn them off again in August), with the exception of XHBJ. Because of the presence of KCAL-TV in the nearby Los Angeles market on channel 9, XHBJ-TDT was unable to take the channel 9 virtual channel assignment Nu9ve holds throughout the rest of Mexico and the station continued to use its pre-digital virtual channel of 45.

XHBJ added a digital signal in the late 2000s on channel 44, where it remained after Tijuana's first-in-Mexico digital conversion in 2013. In March 2018, in order to facilitate the repacking of TV services out of the 600 MHz band (channels 38-51), XHBJ was assigned channel 27 for continued digital operations.
