= KLTX =

Radio station in Long Beach, California, United States

- Long Beach, California; United States
- Broadcast area: Greater Los Angeles
- Frequency: 1390 kHz
- Branding: Radio Inspiración

Programming
- Language: Spanish
- Format: Christian

Ownership
- Owner: Hi-Favor Broadcasting, LLC
- Sister stations: KEZY, KSDO

History
- First air date: December 12, 1926
- Former call signs: KGER (1926–1997)
- Call sign meaning: Former "light" branding

Technical information
- Licensing authority: FCC
- Facility ID: 58625
- Class: B
- Power: 5,000 watts (day); 3,600 watts (night)
- Transmitter coordinates: 33°53′30.1″N 118°11′6.3″W

Links
- Public license information: Public file; LMS
- Website: radioinspiracion.com

KLTX (1390 AM) is a Spanish-language commercial radio station licensed to Long Beach, California, United States, serving the greater Los Angeles area. Owned by Hi-Favor Broadcasting, LLC, it airs a Christian format branded "Radio Inspiración".

== History ==
=== KGER, Merwin Dobyns (1926–1948) ===
The station began broadcasting on December 12, 1926, and held the call sign KGER. The station was owned by C. Merwin Dobyns. Dobyns was in Long Beach's booming oil business, and also worked for his father's company (Dobyns Footwear). In 1926, he founded Consolidated Broadcasting Corporation and began broadcasting at 920 kHz, running 100 watts.

In beginning, programming was mostly Christian religious. It was broadcast from his store at 435 Pine Avenue, Long Beach. Later, they added news from the Press-Telegram, which was novel at the time, when most people got their news from newspapers and it wasn't on the radio. Well-known Los Angeles newsman Clete Roberts got his start with the KGER local news team. KGER also broadcast live music, for example from Nelson Case and even a dance band named Dobyn's Shoestring Orchestra.

In 1930, following a series of frequency changes, the station began operating at 1360 kHz, running 1,000 watts. They had been time-sharing the frequency with KPSN, which was operated by the Pasadena Star-News daily newspaper. This was common in the 1920s and 1930s; in 1931, KGER merged with KPSN and so they were able to use all the time slots with their own programming content.

One notable program in 1933 was a weekly broadcast from Charles E. Fuller, which had large audiences; Fuller would later resign from his church ministry to pursue radio evangelism, and would leave KGER to broadcast from a clear-channel station.

KGER's frequency was changed to 1390 kHz in March 1941, as a result of the North American Regional Broadcasting Agreement. The station's power was increased to 5,000 watts in 1942.

In 1944, KGER became the originating station for Wilbur Nelson's Morning Chapel Hour daily broadcast.

=== KGER, John Brown University (1948–1986) ===
Dobyns died in 1946, and his estate sold KGER to John Elward Brown for $300,000 (equivalent to about $3,863,000 in 2024). Brown, the founder of John Brown University in Arkansas, had four schools in California including Southern California Military Academy in Long Beach and KUOA in Arkansas. Brown had been buying broadcasting time on KGER before he bought it in 1948.

Brown—an evangelist as well as school founder, who also was involved with the National Religious Broadcasting—continued and increased the station's Christian religious programming. KGER continued airing Brown's God's Half Hour, but also aired broadcasts from various Christian denominations, movements, and evangelists, including Foursquare Church, Latter Rain (post–World War II movement), Oral Roberts, American Board of Missions to the Jews, and a weekly broadcast in Spanish from a council of Southern California churches.

Notably, in 1949 KGER broadcast and marketed Billy Graham's 1949 Los Angeles Crusade, with more than 2.5 million people in the Los Angeles area tuning in to listen. Also, J. Vernon McGee, then a new pastor at Church of the Open Door, began his radio broadcasts at KGER to promote that church, which continued for 20 years.

=== KLTX, Salem Communications (1986–2000) ===
In 1986, the station was sold to Salem Communications for $4,350,000 (equivalent to about $12,316,770 in 2024). Around the time KGER was sold to Salem Communications, two broadcasting regulations changed:

- In 1987, the FCC repealed the fairness doctrine, which had required broadcasters to provide contrasting viewpoints on controversial issues
- The Telecommunications Act of 1996 allowed companies to own a greater share of radio stations

These events caused an increase in Christian radio stations and brisk buying and selling of radio stations as companies acquired more stations and consolidated the market. Salem Media Group was one of the largest companies to do this, buying new stations across the United States. KGER was one of the many stations they bought.

==== Call sign change to KLTX (1997) ====
In 1997, the station's call sign was changed to KLTX. The station was branded "K-Light" and aired a Christian talk and teaching format. The station also aired Michael Reagan's talk show. Spanish language religious programming aired at night.

=== KLTX, Hi-Favor Broadcasting (2000–present) ===
In 2000, KLTX was sold to Hi-Favor Broadcasting for $30 million (equivalent to about $54 million in 2024), and the station became an affiliate of the Spanish-language evangelical network Radio Nueva Vida. By 2019, the station had disaffiliated from Radio Nueva Vida, but continued to air a Spanish language Christian format as Radio Inspiración.
