= XHLNC-FM =

Radio station in Tecate, Baja California, Mexico

- Tecate, Baja California; Mexico
- Broadcast area: San Diego–Tijuana
- Frequency: 104.9 FM
- Branding: La Numero Uno

Programming
- Format: Regional Mexican

Ownership
- Owner: Martha Margarita Barba de la Torre

History
- First air date: 1998 as an Internet radio station February 14, 2000 on 90.7 MHz; February 10, 2008 on 104.9 MHz
- Former call signs: XHTNA-FM (February–August 2000)
- Former frequencies: 90.7 MHz (2000–2008)
- Call sign meaning: Excellency (the letters, XLNC, when spoken in English, sound like the word excellency) (previous branding)

Technical information
- Licensing authority: CRT
- Class: C1
- ERP: 7,500 watts
- HAAT: 794.7 meters (2,607 ft)
- Transmitter coordinates: 32°18′49″N 116°39′53″W

Links
- Webcast: Listen live
- Website: lanumerouno1049.fm

XHLNC-FM is a noncommercial radio station in Tecate, Baja California, Mexico, on 104.9 FM. It broadcasts to the San Diego–Tijuana metropolitan area from a transmitter on Cerro Bola. XHLNC-FM airs a Regional Mexican format and is branded as La Número Uno.

From 2000 to 2018, XHLNC was a classical music station known as XLNC1, broadcasting from studios in Chula Vista, California. Since then, it has been operated by several Mexican and United States groups.

== History ==
=== As a classical music station ===
==== Foundation and early years ====
The station was founded by Víctor Díaz, who owned Califórmula Broadcasting, a company that controlled numerous stations in Tijuana. Upon his death in 2004, Diaz stipulated that XHLNC-FM continue with its classical format, from funding Díaz had set aside, as well as contributions from listeners. The station permit was transferred to Martha Margarita Barba de la Torre, his wife.

XLNC1 began in 1998 as an internet radio project showcasing classical music. In January 2000, it transitioned into a physical radio station on 90.7 MHz upon receiving its permit.

==== Frequency change ====
XHLNC, which for its first six months was known as XHTNA-FM, was originally permitted to sign-on with a Class A 1,000-watt signal, broadcasting from a tower located in the Mount San Antonio area of Tijuana that had been used by other Califórmula stations. 90.7 is also the frequency for KPFK in Los Angeles, which operates at a grandfathered 110,000 watts. (Southern California is in the Class B zone, where FM stations would normally have a maximum power of 50,000 watts.) Due to KPFK's enlarged coverage area, XLNC1's signal suffered co-channel interference in many sections of San Diego County. However, due to a treaty between the US and Mexico concerning radio stations near the border, XLNC1 could not increase its coverage much north of the border. Despite this, Díaz solicited a power increase for XHLNC to 10 kW, which the SCT approved on July 14, 2003.

On June 29, 2007, Cofetel, the Mexican Federal Telecommunications Commission, cleared XHLNC-FM to switch frequencies to 104.9 MHz and move its transmitter to Cerro Bola in Tecate (also used by XHHIT-FM and XHPRS-FM). The move was announced by XLNC1 the next month. The switch would bring less interference to the station, resolve interference to KPFK, allow the station to boost its power from 1,000 watts to 7,500 watts, and move its tower to "the highest point in Baja", 1,280 metres (4,200 ft) above sea level.

==== Transmitter problems ====
The frequency change took place on February 10, 2008. At first, the 90.7 frequency aired a pre-recorded message by Gordon Brown stating that XLNC1 had moved to 104.9 FM. Unfortunately, the new transmitter had problems, causing some listeners to experience reception problems on XLNC1's new frequency. About two weeks after the frequency change, XLNC1's e-mail newsletter reported that there was a faulty component in the transmitter that would take some time to replace. On February 26, XLNC1 decided to simulcast programming on both 90.7 and 104.9 frequencies. By fall of that year, XLNC1 had its 90.7 frequency taken back by the Mexican government, and the station was broadcasting only on 104.9 FM.

In 2010, XHTIM-FM was authorized to move from 97.7 to 90.7 and increase its power by using the frequency on which XHLNC once broadcast.

==== Moving away from longer works ====
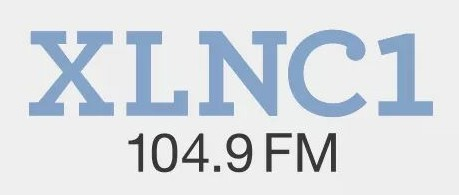
Final logo as a classical music station

In July 2010, XLNC1 decided to remove the label "Classical Music" from its advertising and replace it with more generic terms such as "Great Music", "Beautiful Music", and "Music for All Generations." The decision was also made to remove lengthy repertoire and opera from general programming in favor of lighter classical and crossover works. This was explained as a method to reach out to younger listeners. The station continues to broadcast lengthier works in the evenings with programs entitled "Gala Concerts".

As a classical station serving a binational audience, XLNC1 typically introduced pieces in Spanish and gave the information in English at the end. Announcers included Kingsley McLaren, Sue Harland, Gabriela Guinea-Johnston (chief Spanish announcer) and Gordon Brown. Most of the programming was automated, with the announcers prerecording their identifications of titles, artists and composers.

=== The end of classical and Toño era ===
Logo as Toño from March 2018 to December 2019

On February 9, 2018, XLNC1 announced through their official Facebook account that they would no longer be broadcasting on FM and would only continue online, effective March 1, due to a lack of continued donations.

The announcement read:

"Dear listeners, it is with a heavy heart that we inform you that as of March 1, XLNC1 will no longer be broadcasting on the air (104.9 FM). We will, however, maintain our streaming service online via our website at www.xlnc1.org, and you will still be able to listen to us through our App on iPhone and Android devices. We are truly grateful for all the years we have been able to reach our wonderful audience in San Diego and Baja California, and we sincerely thank you for all of your generous support through the years."

The station ended FM transmissions on March 2, and on March 3, the new format was announced: the 104.9 frequency was taken over by Grupo Larsa Comunicaciones, the largest broadcaster in Sonora which had assumed control of stations in Mexicali in 2017, and began to carry its flagship Toño Spanish Adult Hits format in a non-commercial version, owing to XHLNC's status as a social station.

=== Más Flo, Click XM and La Número Uno ===
On December 17, 2019, MLC Media, a Spanish-language radio syndication company based in Los Angeles, announced it would assume control of XHLNC and run it as Spanish rhythmic "Más Flo" beginning the next day, with programming originating from its LA studios.

On April 1, 2020, MLC Media pulled the plug on the "Mas Flo" Spanish rhythmic format and changed their format to Spanish adult hits, citing the noncommercial nature of the XHLNC concession. The station then returned to Spanish adult contemporary/adult hits as "Click XM".

In March 2021, new operators took control of XHLNC-FM, and the station flipped to Regional Mexican as "La Número Uno".
