= Roberto Barbon =

Cuban-born Japanese baseball player

- Barbon's 1960 Japanese baseball card
- Second baseman
- Born: March 13, 1933; Matanzas, Cuba
- Died: March 12, 2023 (aged 89); Nishinomiya, Hyogo, Japan
- Batted: Right Threw: Right

NPB debut
- 1955, for the Hankyu Braves

Last NPB appearance
- 1965, for the Kintetsu Buffaloes

NPB statistics
- Batting average: .241
- Hits: 1,123
- Home runs: 33
- Runs batted in: 260
- Stolen bases: 308

Teams
- Hankyu Braves (1955–1964); Kintetsu Buffaloes (1965)

Career highlights and awards
- 3× NPB stolen base leader (1958–1960); First Latin American player in NPB

Roberto Barbon (March 13, 1933 – January 12, 2023), nicknamed "Chico", was a Cuban-born Japanese baseball second baseman who became the first Latin American player to play in Nippon Professional Baseball in Japan. He played majority of his career for the Hankyu Braves, from 1955 to 1964, before ending it with the Kintetsu Buffaloes in 1965.

== Biography ==
Born in Matanzas, Cuba, Barbon was one of twelve children and the son of a sugar cane farmer.

After playing in integrated, independent leagues in Canada, Barbon signed with the Brooklyn Dodgers organization and spent two years in the minor leagues. He signed with the Hankyu Braves of the NPB after learning he would be demoted to Brooklyn's Tennessee-affiliated team and did not want to play in the segregated American South. Barbon initially wanted to play three years and hoped to attract an MLB team but ended up staying as he felt "at home" there.

Barbon fit well into Japan's small ball style of play. He holds the record for most stolen bases by a westerner in NPB history and led the league in stolen bases three times. Additionally, he was the first foreigner to record 1,000 hits. In his career, he hit .241 with 33 home runs and 308 stolen bases.

After his retirement, Barbon settled in Japan and married a local woman and worked as an interpreter for foreign baseball players. Barbon died on March 12, 2023, in Nishinomiya, Japan, one day before his 90th birthday.

In 2023, he was inducted in the Hispanic Heritage Baseball Museum Hall of Fame and was posthumously awarded their Pioneer Award.
