= 620 AM =

AM radio frequency

The following radio stations broadcast on AM frequency 620 kHz: 620 AM is a Regional broadcast frequency.

== In Antigua and Barbuda ==
- V2C-AM in Saint John's

== In Argentina ==
- LRA18 in El Turbio
- LRA26 in Resistencia, Chaco
- LRA28 La Rioja, La Rioja
- LT17 in Posadas, Misiones
- LV4 in San Rafael, Mendoza

== In Brazil ==
- ZYH-270 in Pelotas
- ZYH-293 in Lábrea
- ZYH-590 in Fortaleza
- ZYH-777 in Pires do Rio
- ZYJ-332 in Jandaia do Sul
- ZYJ-779 in Rio do Sul
- ZYK-315 in Tenente Portela
- ZYK-521 in São Paulo
- ZYL240 in Ibiá
- ZYL320 in Porteirinha
- ZYL357 in Manhuaçu

== In Canada ==
Call sign	City of license	Daytime kW	Nighttime kW	Transmitter coordinates
CKCM	Grand Falls, Newfoundland and Labrador	10	10	48.944167°N 55.641944°W
CKRM	Regina, Saskatchewan	10	10	50.326667°N 104.621111°W

== In Chile ==
- CA-062 in Ovalle
- CC-062 in Concepción

== In Colombia ==
- HJEL in Santiago de Cali
- HJVP in Cartagena
- HJR26 in Cúcuta

== In Cuba ==
- CMDA in Colón
- CMKF in Moa

== In the Dominican Republic ==
- HIB28 (formerly HISD) in Santo Domingo

== In Ecuador ==
- HCXY1 in Loja

== In Guatemala ==
- TGTQ in Coatepeque / La Reforma / Santa Clara

== In Honduras ==
- HRDP 5 in La Esperanza
- HRLP 17 in San Pedro Sula

== In Jamaica ==
- JBC in Spur Tree

== In Mexico ==
- XEGH-AM in Río Bravo, Tamaulipas
- XEGMSR-AM in Villahermosa, Tabasco
- XENK-AM in Mexico City (San Andrés de la Cañada, State of Mexico)
- XESS-AM in Puerto Nuevo, Baja California

== In Nicaragua ==
- YNA3RN (Formerly YNGR1) in Tipitapa

== In Panama ==
- HOQ 53 in Los Algarrobos

== In Paraguay ==
- ZP 40 in San Estanislao de Kostka (Santaní)

== In Peru ==
- OAX2M in Chepen
- OCY4A in Estrella Sur

== In Saint Lucia ==
- RSL in Castries

== In the United States ==
Call sign	City of license	Facility ID	Class	Daytime kW	Nighttime kW	Unlimited power (kW)	Transmitter coordinates
KGTL	Homer, Alaska	52152	B			5	59.684167°N 151.630833°W
KIGS	Hanford, California	51122	B	1	1		36.326389°N 119.566389°W
KJOL	Grand Junction, Colorado	21628	D	5	0.079		39.126389°N 108.636944°W
KMJC	Mount Shasta, California	60024	D	1	0.029		41.319167°N 122.309722°W
KMNS	Sioux City, Iowa	10775	B	1	1		42.373611°N 96.448056°W
KPOJ	Portland, Oregon	53069	B	25	10		45.422222°N 122.565833°W
KTAR	Phoenix, Arizona	52515	B	5	5		33.478889°N 112.001667°W
WAKY	Louisville, Kentucky	30798	B	0.5	0.5		38.316389°N 85.702222°W
WDAE	Saint Petersburg, Florida	74198	B	5.6	5.5		27.876944°N 82.590556°W
WDNC	Durham, North Carolina	17762	D	1.5	0.041		35.967778°N 78.888056°W
WFMV	Cayce, South Carolina	42020	D	2.5	0.126		33.959444°N 81.041111°W
WHEN	Syracuse, New York	7080	B	5	1		43.092778°N 76.188056°W (daytime); 43.092222°N 76.189444°W (nighttime)
WJDX	Jackson, Mississippi	59817	B	5	1		32.382222°N 90.190556°W
WKHB	Irwin, Pennsylvania	72297	D	5.5	0.05		40.288889°N 79.701111°W
WRJZ	Knoxville, Tennessee	65209	B	5	5		35.99°N 83.8375°W
WSNR	Jersey City, New Jersey	61643	B	3	7.6		40.798056°N 74.106667°W
WTMJ	Milwaukee, Wisconsin	74096	B	50	10		42.707778°N 88.065833°W
WVMT	Burlington, Vermont	29923	B	5	5		44.534444°N 73.220833°W
WWNR	Beckley, West Virginia	40501	D	5	0.025		37.755°N 81.236667°W
WZON	Bangor, Maine	66674	B	5	5		44.828889°N 68.785556°W

== In Venezuela ==
- YVNO in Cabimas
