= XHFG-FM =

Radio station in Tijuana, Baja California, Mexico

- Tijuana, Baja California; Mexico
- Broadcast area: San Diego–Tijuana
- Frequency: 107.3 MHz
- Branding: Pulsar 107.3

Programming
- Format: Spanish hot AC

Ownership
- Owner: Grupo Uniradio; (Radiodifusora XHFG-FM, S.A. de C.V.)
- Sister stations: XEMO-AM, XHA-FM, XHTY-FM

History
- First air date: August 1, 1980
- Call sign meaning: Felipe Fernández González, original concessionaire

Technical information
- Licensing authority: CRT
- Class: C1
- ERP: 20,600 watts
- HAAT: 282 meters (925 ft)

Links
- Webcast: Listen live
- Website: pulsar1073.com

XHFG-FM is a radio station in Tijuana, Baja California, Mexico. Broadcasting on 107.3 FM. XHFG is owned by Grupo Uniradio and carries a Spanish Hot AC format known as Pulsar 107.3. Uniradio has studios in Tijuana and a sales office in Chula Vista, California.

XHFG-FM formerly broadcast in HD.

== History ==
XHFG came to air on August 1, 1980. It was owned by Felipe Fernández González. From the 1990s until 2002, the station aired an English language classic hits format known as "Stereo 107.3". In 2002, the station adopted its present format.
