= Hispanic Heritage Baseball Museum Hall of Fame =

Museum in the Mission District in San Francisco, California, U.S.

- Established: October 24, 1998
- Location: Mission District; San Francisco, California, U.S.
- Founder: Gabriel "Tito" Avila Jr.
- Website: hhbmhof.com

The Hispanic Heritage Baseball Museum Hall of Fame is an international museum and hall of fame which was founded in San Francisco, California to honor and recognize the contributions made to baseball by Hispanic and Latin baseball players as well as players with the heritage.

== History ==
The museum and hall of fame was founded in the Mission District in San Francisco, California on October 24, 1998, and was incorporated as a non-profit organization on June 23, 1999, in Sacramento, California. The idea of the museum came from Gabriel "Tito" Avila Jr., a former semi-professional baseball player from New York City who resides in San Francisco.

Avila wanted to honor the greatest Hispanic baseball players of all time and founded the museum as an international organization dedicated to recognizing the contributions made to baseball by Hispanic and Latino players. Since its inception, the Hispanic Heritage Baseball Museum Hall of Fame has inducted seventy-four players, coaches, broadcasters, Hispanic players who played in the Negro leagues, Major League Baseball scorers, and executives.

== Inductees ==
Key
*	Inducted into the National Baseball Hall of Fame

Inductee	Nationality	Year	Position	Ref.
Edgardo Alfonzo	Venezuela	2013	Third baseman; Second baseman	
Roberto Alomar^{*}	Puerto Rico	2019	Shortstop	
Sandy Alomar Jr.	Puerto Rico	2021	Catcher	
Sandy Alomar Sr.	Puerto Rico	2005	Second baseman; Coach	
Felipe Alou	Dominican Republic	2003	Outfielder; First baseman; Manager	
Matty Alou	Dominican Republic	2007	Outfielder	
Rubén Amaro Jr.	Mexico	2022	Outfielder	
Luis Aparicio^{*}	Venezuela	2007	Shortstop	
Joe Azcue	Cuba	2012	Catcher	
Carlos Baerga	Puerto Rico	2021	Second baseman	
Roberto Barbon	Cuba	2023	Infielder	
Carlos Beltrán	Puerto Rico	2026	Outfielder	
Adrián Beltré	Dominican Republic	2022	Third baseman	
Bert Campaneris	Cuba	2006	Shortstop	
Leo Cardenas	Cuba	2016	Shortstop; Third baseman	
Rod Carew^{*}	Panama	2010	First baseman; Second baseman	
Orlando Cepeda^{*}	Puerto Rico	2002	First baseman	
Roberto Clemente^{*}	Puerto Rico	2010	Right fielder	
Dave Concepción	Venezuela	2022	Shortstop	
José Cruz	Puerto Rico	2002	Outfielder	
Julio Cruz	Puerto Rico	2004	Second baseman	
Vic Davalillo	Venezuela	2024	Outfieler	
Martín Dihigo^{*}	Cuba	1999	Pitcher; Second baseman	
Alex Fernández	Cuba	2008	Pitcher	
Tito Fuentes	Cuba	2002	Second baseman	
Mike Garcia	United States	2024	Pitcher	
Rich Garcia	United States	2025	Umpire	
Alfredo Griffin	Dominican Republic	2004	Shortstop	
Lefty Gómez^{*}	United States	2011	Pitcher	
Preston Gómez	Cuba	2003	Second baseman	
Luis Gonzalez	United States	2011	Outfielder	
Tony González	Cuba	2024	Outfielder	
Pedro Guerrero	Dominican Republic	2016	Outfielder; Third baseman; First baseman	
Vladimir Guerrero^{*}	Dominican Republic	2018	Right fielder; Designated hitter	
Carlos Guillén	Venezuela	2012	Shortstop	
Keith Hernandez	United States	2019	First baseman	
Willie Hernández	Puerto Rico	2023	Pitcher	
Rudy Jaramillo	United States	2008	Coach	
Julián Javier	Dominican Republic	2011	Second baseman	
Stan Javier	Dominican Republic	2011	Outfielder	
Roberto Kelly	Panama	2011	Outfielder	
Tony La Russa^{*}	United States	2008	Infielder; Manager	
Sixto Lezcano	Puerto Rico	2023	Outfielder	
Al López^{*}	United States	2006	Catcher; Manager	
Héctor López	Panama	2007	Outfielder; Third baseman	
Candy Maldonado	Puerto Rico	2021	Outfielder	
Juan Marichal^{*}	Dominican Republic	2003	Pitcher	
Billy Martin	United States	2020	Second baseman; Manager	
Buck Martinez	United States	2012	Catcher	
Edgar Martínez^{*}	Puerto Rico	2003	Designated hitter	
Pedro Martínez^{*}	Dominican Republic	2015	Pitcher	
José Méndez	Cuba	2006	Pitcher	
Minnie Miñoso^{*}	Cuba	2002	Outfielder	
Felix Millan	Puerto Rico	2013	Second baseman	
Orlando Mercado	Puerto Rico	2004	Catcher; Coach	
Manny Mota	Dominican Republic	2003	Outfielder	
Millito Navarro	Puerto Rico	2006	Outfielder	
Tony Oliva^{*}	Cuba	2014	Outfielder	
Jose Oquendo	Puerto Rico	2013	Outfielder; Infielder	
Camilo Pascual	Cuba	2012	Pitcher	
Tony Pérez^{*}	Cuba	2001	Third baseman; First baseman	
Alex Pompez^{*}	Cuba	2006	Owner	
Vic Power	Puerto Rico	2024	First baseman	
Pedro Ramos	Cuba	2025	Pitcher	
Jackie Robinson^{*}	United States	2018	Second baseman	
Iván Rodríguez^{*}	Puerto Rico	2017	Catcher	
Cookie Rojas	Cuba	2011	Outfielder; Second baseman	
Luis Salazar	Venezuela	2011	Outfielder; Shortstop; Third baseman	
Manny Sanguillen	Panama	2019	Catcher	
Benito Santiago	Puerto Rico	2012	Catcher	
José Santiago	Puerto Rico	2021	Pitcher	
Juan Samuel	Dominican Republic	2010	Second baseman	
Diego Seguí	Cuba	2006	Pitcher	
Rubén Sierra	Puerto Rico	2011	Outfielder	
Julián Tavárez	Dominican Republic	2026	Pitcher	
Tony Taylor	Cuba	2004	Second baseman	
Dickie Thon	Puerto Rico	2003	Shortstop	
Luis Tiant	Cuba	2002	Pitcher	
Cristóbal Torriente^{*}	Cuba	2006	Outfielder; Infielder; Pitcher	
Alex Treviño	Mexico	2003	Catcher	
Manny Trillo	Venezuela	2023	Second baseman	
Fernando Valenzuela	Mexico	2003	Pitcher	
Omar Vizquel	Venezuela	2007	Shortstop	
Bernie Williams	Puerto Rico	2017	Centerfielder	
Ted Williams^{*}	United States	2002	Left fielder	

== Broadcasters wing ==
Key
*	Ford C. Frick Award recipient

Induction	Nationality	Year	Team	Ref.
Joe Angel	Colombia	2023	Baltimore Orioles	
Billy Berroa	Dominican Republic	2005	New York Mets	
Buck Canel^{*}	Argentina	1999	Brooklyn Dodgers	
René Cárdenas	Nicaragua	2002	Houston Astros	
Jaime Jarrín^{*}	Ecuador	2003	Los Angeles Dodgers	
Eduardo Ortega	Mexico	2016	San Diego Padres	
Amaury Pi-Gonzalez	Cuba	2004	San Francisco Giants	
Felo Ramírez	Cuba	2001	Florida Marlins	
Mario Thomas	Mexico	2010	San Diego Padres	

== See also ==
- Caribbean Baseball Hall of Fame
- Cuban Baseball Hall of Fame
- Mexican Professional Baseball Hall of Fame
- Venezuelan Baseball Hall of Fame and Museum
