= XEGMSR-AM =

Radio station in Villahermosa, Tabasco

Villahermosa, Tabasco; Mexico
- Frequency: 620 kHz
- Branding: 620 AM, La Radio Que Se Ve

Programming
- Format: Talk

Ownership
- Owner: Grupo Multimedios Sin Reservas, S.A. de C.V.

History
- First air date: March 5, 2018
- Call sign meaning: Grupo Multimedios Sin Reservas

Technical information
- Class: B
- Power: 2.5 kW

Links
- Website: sinreservas.mx

XEGMSR-AM is a radio station on 620 AM in Villahermosa, Tabasco, in Mexico. It is owned by Grupo Multimedios Sin Reservas and carries a talk format.

== History ==
XEGMSR was awarded in the IFT-4 radio auction of 2017 and came to air on March 5, 2018. The frequency had previously been occupied by XEHGR-AM, which migrated to FM as XHHGR-FM 94.1.

It was owned by Juan Carlos Huerta Gutiérrez, who had previously spent two decades hosting the local Panorama Informativo newscast on Grupo ACIR stations. However, within three months of signing on XEGMSR, on May 15, 2018, Huerta was killed outside of his home, making him the fourth journalist to die in Mexico in 2018.
