= XEC-AM =

Radio station in Tijuana, Baja California

- Tijuana, Baja California; Mexico
- Frequency: 1310 kHz
- Branding: PSN, Radio Enciso; Expresión

Programming
- Format: Talk

Ownership
- Owner: Gloria Herminia Enciso Power; Gloria Herminia, Maricel, José Enrique, Marcia, Claudia Beatriz and Laura Elena Jiménez Enciso
- Operator: Primer Sistema de Noticias (PSN)
- Sister stations: XEWW-AM, XEAZ-AM, XEPE-AM, XHPRS-FM

History
- First air date: 1930s

Technical information
- Licensing authority: CRT
- Class: C
- Power: 1,000 watts day 250 watts night
- Transmitter coordinates: 32°31′15″N 117°01′16″W

XEC-AM is a radio station in Tijuana, Baja California, broadcasting on 1310 AM. It carries a talk format. It is operated by Primer Sistema de Noticias, a company of businessman and former Baja California governor Jaime Bonilla Valdez. It simulcasts the Expresión talk programming of XHBJ-TDT 45.2. It is also known as Radio Enciso.

== History ==
XEC's original concession was awarded to Luis E. Enciso in 1934. The Enciso family would own the station for 84 years until its sale in 2018 to Jaime Bonilla's PSN. The sale allowed Radio Enciso, which was financially strapped at the time, to avoid a strike by unionized employees, but it led to major programming reshuffles and left several station employees out of work. Unofficial reports placed the station's sale price at about US$2.5 million.
