= XEPE-AM =

Radio station in Tecate, Baja California, Mexico

- Tecate, Baja California; Mexico
- Broadcast area: San Diego–Tijuana
- Frequency: 1700 kHz
- Branding: TUDN Radio 1700 AM

Programming
- Language: Spanish
- Format: Sports radio
- Affiliations: TUDN Radio

Ownership
- Owner: Primer Sistema de Noticias; (Media Sports de México, S.A. de C.V.)
- Operator: Uforia Audio Network
- Sister stations: XEWW-AM, XEAZ-AM, XEC-AM, XHPRS-FM

History
- First air date: March 28, 2005
- Former call signs: XEKTT-AM (1994–2005)

Technical information
- Licensing authority: CRT
- Class: B
- Power: 10,000 watts
- Transmitter coordinates: 32°32′16″N 116°59′23″W

Links
- Website: XEPE-AM on Facebook

XEPE-AM (1700 AM) is a radio station in Tecate, Baja California, Mexico, serving the San Diego–Tijuana area. XEPE is owned and operated by Media Sports de México, a company of businessman and former Baja California governor Jaime Bonilla Valdez, and is part of his Primer Sistema de Noticias network. It is a sports talk station known as TUDN La Deportiva and affiliated with TUDN Radio.

XEPE is on the air 24 hours a day at 10,000 watts in the AM expanded band, commonly known as the "X band", and is the only commercial station in Mexico's expanded band. The 1700 kHz frequency has de facto clear channel status. There are no expanded AM band stations at 1700 AM in the United States west of Texas or in the rest of Mexico. Unlike most X-band stations in the U.S., which reduce their power to 1,000 watts at night, XEPE keeps its 10,000 watts of power around the clock. It uses a directional antenna at all times, with its transmitter in Cerro Jaramillo.

== History ==
The history of XEPE begins in August 1987, when Guillermo Dionisio Salas Vargas was selected by the Mexican government from among 19 applicants to operate a station on 1600 kHz. The call sign assigned at that time was XETCT-AM. By the time a concession was issued in 1994, the station had the call sign XEKTT-AM. In 1999, XEKTT was sold to Carlos de Jesús Quiñones Armendáriz (Radio S.A.), who in turn sold the station to Media Sports de México, S.A. de C.V.

In the late 1990s and early 2000s, both the frequency and call sign changed, the former on several occasions. XEKTT unsuccessfully experimented with a move to a lower frequency. It abruptly moved to 550 kHz, which caused interference concerns for US stations. XEKTT was prompted to move to 560, but that did not remediate the interference and instead prompted action by US broadcasters who sought to revoke XEKTT's authorization to receive programming from across the border. In 2004, the SCT (Mexico's communications authority) authorized the station to move to 1700 kHz, and in February 2005, the call sign was changed to XEPE-AM.

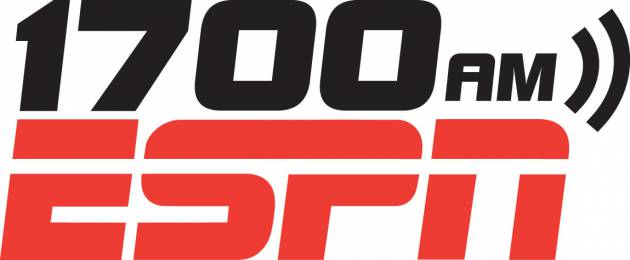
Logo used as an ESPN Radio affiliate

XEPE was on the air in the spring of 2005 and used to supplement sister XEPRS in its coverage of San Diego Padres games. That August, XEPE added a business talk format under the branding "Cash 1700". On August 1, 2007, XEPE switched to a talk radio format, while keeping some business talk programs, such as financial talk show host Ray Lucia. Conservative syndicated talk shows from Michael Reagan and Dennis Miller were also on the schedule. After progressive talk station 1360 KLSD switched to a sports format, XEPE tried adding some liberal-leaning shows including one locally hosted by Stacy Taylor. The syndicated The Lionel Show was carried during overnight hours.

In late 2009, XEPE became a partner to sister station XEPRS 1090. XEPRS was enjoying success as San Diego's top sports radio station, and XEPE began running some of the games and sports shows that XEPRS couldn't carry due to other commitments. On October 6, 2010, the station became an affiliate of ESPN Radio as ESPN 1700. In 2017, the station's daytime lineup began to carry a block of financial talk shows under the banner Your Business, Your Life.

On December 12, 2018, the station's ESPN Radio programming, as well as that of sister station XHPRS-FM, was taken off-air due to a payment dispute between the station's ownership and Broadcast Company of the Americas. The over-the-air transmitter carried a simulcast of XESDD-AM until February 3, 2020, when the station began running the Heraldo Radio news-talk network from Mexico City. In 2022, the station switched to airing PSN-produced programming.

== Sports rights ==
XEPE is the Spanish-language radio voice of the San Diego FC, a Major League Soccer club in the Western Division. Ricardo “Pony” Jiménez provides the play-by-play in Spanish, while KGB 760 AM broadcasts the games in English.

At its demise, play-by-play on ESPN 1700 consisted of the University of San Diego football and basketball games and San Diego Gulls hockey games (on a secondary basis, shared with XEPRS).

At one time, it aired San Diego State Aztecs basketball, the LA Galaxy of Major League Soccer and San Diego Sockers PASL games. It was also the flagship station of the San Diego Shockwave of the National Indoor Football League until the league suspended operations. It also had broadcast rights to the Lake Elsinore Storm minor league baseball team until 2009, when it lost the rights to KXFG.
