= KEZY =

Radio station in San Bernardino, California

- San Bernardino, California; United States
- Broadcast area: Inland Empire
- Frequency: 1240 kHz
- Branding: Radio Inspiración

Programming
- Format: Spanish Religious

Ownership
- Owner: Hi-Favor Broadcasting, LLC
- Sister stations: KLTX, KSDO

History
- First air date: 1948
- Former call signs: KRNO (1948–1970); KBON (1970–1980); KDIG (1980–1987); KLFE (1987–1995); KKLA (1995–1999); KLTH (1999–2000)

Technical information
- Licensing authority: FCC
- Facility ID: 28663
- Class: C
- Power: 1,000 watts (unlimited)
- Transmitter coordinates: 34°4′20″N 117°17′55″W

Links
- Public license information: Public file; LMS
- Website: radioinspiracion.com

KEZY (1240 AM) is a radio station broadcasting a Spanish language Christian format. Licensed to San Bernardino, California, United States, the station is currently owned by Hi-Favor Broadcasting, LLC.

KEZY and its sister stations KLTX and KSDO serve Southern California with Spanish Christian programming, and are branded Radio Inspiración.

== History ==
The station initially signed on in 1948 as KRNO. On October 26, 1970, the station changed its call sign to KBON. On August 1, 1980, the station changed its call sign to KDIG; on July 27, 1987, to KLFE; on August 1, 1995, to KKLA; on August 30, 1999, to KLTH; and on September 27, 2000, to the current KEZY.

KEZY joined the Spanish language evangelical Christian network Radio Nueva Vida in 2002. Before that, it was a simulcast of KLTX 1390 AM, airing Christian teaching shows (such as Through the Bible) and Michael Reagan's talk show. It was also the play-by-play home of the Rancho Cucamonga Quakes of the California League of minor-league baseball in 2000 and carried some high school football games as well.

By 2019, the station had disaffiliated from Radio Nueva Vida, but continued to air a Spanish language Christian format as Radio Inspiración.
