= Mario Thomas =

Mexican baseball announcer (1923 – 2017)

- Born: c. 1924; Tijuana, Baja California, Mexico
- Died: August 28, 2009 (aged 85); Tijuana, Baja California, Mexico
- Occupation: Baseball play-by-play announcer
- Years active: 1969–1997
- Employer: San Diego Padres

Mario Thomas Zapiáin (c. 1924 – August 8, 2009), nicknamed "Don Mario", was a Mexican Spanish language baseball announcer who worked San Diego Padres games for 28 seasons, from 1969 to 1997.

Born in Tijuana, Thomas began working for the Padres as their play-by-play announcer in 1969, alongside color commentator Gustavo López Moreno. Other than the 1970 season, he called Padres games until his retirement in 1997. Additionally, he also worked games for the Aguilas de Mexicali of the Mexican League in the offseason and called the Caribbean Series in 1986.

Eduardo Ortega, Thomas' partner for the last eleven years of his tenure, would recall later that he imitated Thomas' style of calling games when he started his broadcasting career.

As a sign of respect, Thomas was nicknamed "Don Mario". During the 25th anniversary of his tenure, Thomas was presented with a plaque by fellow Padre's broadcaster Jerry Coleman. During the ceremony, Coleman joked: "I didn't know your first name was Donald." The plaque read: "In recognition of DON MARIO THOMAS".

Thomas died in August 2009, aged 85, and was inducted into the Hispanic Heritage Baseball Museum Hall of Fame in 2010.
