= KMRO =

Radio Nueva Vida flagship station in Camarillo, California, United States

- Camarillo, California; United States
- Broadcast area: Ventura County, California; Santa Barbara, California
- Frequency: 90.3 MHz
- Branding: Radio Nueva Vida

Programming
- Language: Spanish
- Format: Christian
- Network: Radio Nueva Vida

Ownership
- Owner: Educational Media Foundation; (The Association For Community Education, Inc.)
- Sister stations: KAIV

History
- First air date: January 19, 1987
- Call sign meaning: Camarillo

Technical information
- Licensing authority: FCC
- Facility ID: 65404
- Class: B
- ERP: 10,500 watts
- HAAT: 324 meters (1,063 ft)
- Transmitter coordinates: 34°24′47″N 119°11′10″W
- Translator: See § Translators
- Repeaters: 980 KEYQ (Fresno); 90.9 KGZO (Shafter)

Links
- Public license information: Public file; LMS
- Webcast: Listen live
- Website: nuevavida.com

KMRO (90.3 FM) is a non-commercial radio station licensed to Camarillo, California, United States, and broadcasting to the areas of Ventura County and southern Santa Barbara County. Owned by the Educational Media Foundation, it is the flagship station of the Radio Nueva Vida network. In addition to its extensive network of translator stations, KMRO is simulcast on two full-power repeaters in California: KEYQ (980 AM) in Fresno and KGZO (90.9 FM) in Shafter.

== History ==
=== KMRO ===
KMRO was first signed on January 19, 1987, by The Association for Community Education, Inc. KMRO is the flagship station of Radio Nueva Vida, a Spanish-language Christian talk and teaching radio network.

=== KEYQ ===
KEYQ first went on the air on October 14, 1957. It was purchased by Americom in 1967. From September 1992 to May 1993, the station held the call letters KFSO, after which it reverted to the KEYQ calls. In 1997, Jonna Hooker sold KEYQ to The Association for Community Education, Inc. for $200,000.

=== KGZO ===
The station signed on July 19, 1993, as KLOD; it was owned by High Adventure Ministries, Inc. KLOD changed its call sign to KGZO on April 5, 1996. In 1997, High Adventure Ministries sold KGZO to The Association for Community Education for $240,000.

=== EMF acquires Nueva Vida ===
In December 2024, the Educational Media Foundation reached an agreement to take over the Association for Community Education as its sole member, continuing its activities as a subsidiary. This will therefore result in the acquisition of its stations (including KMRO, KEYQ and KGZO) by the EMF pending FCC approval; the transaction will have no financial consideration. The acquisition was completed on February 7, 2025.

== Translators ==
KMRO is relayed by these translators to widen its broadcast area:

Call sign	Frequency	City of license	State	Facility ID
K235BX	94.9 FM	Calexico	California	142606
K217EF	91.3 FM	Desert Center	California	93605
K251AH	98.1 FM	Grand Terrace	California	83340
K209FV	89.7 FM	Los Banos	California	89028
K295AI	106.9 FM	Muscoy	California	86384
K217CQ	91.3 FM	Salinas	California	84386
K211DK	90.1 FM	Santa Ana	California	83327
K269EW	101.7 FM	Santa Maria	California	142365
K219DK	91.7 FM	Victorville	California	85689

== See also ==
- Tele Vida Abundante
