= XEKAM-AM =

Radio Fórmula station in Tijuana

- Rosarito, Baja California; Mexico
- Broadcast area: San Diego–Tijuana
- Frequency: 950 AM (HD Radio)
- Branding: Radio Fórmula

Programming
- Format: Spanish News/Talk

Ownership
- Owner: Grupo Fórmula Baja California; (Transmisora Regional Radio Fórmula, S.A. de C.V.)
- Sister stations: XHKT-FM

History
- First air date: November 10, 1961

Technical information
- Licensing authority: CRT
- Class: B
- Power: 20,000 watts (day); 5,000 watts (night)

Links
- Website: radioformula.com.mx

XEKAM-AM (950 kHz) is a radio station in Rosarito, Baja California, serving the Tijuana-San Diego area. It has a Spanish language news/talk radio format. It mostly carries Radio Fórmula programming from Mexico City.

XEKAM is a Class B station. By day, it is powered at 20,000 watts. But to reduce interference to other stations on 950 AM, it reduces power at night to 5,000 watts. XEKAM broadcasts using HD Radio technology.

== History ==
The station received its concession on November 10, 1961. The original call sign was XEGM. It was owned by Gustavo Faist Morán's Difusoras del Valle, S.A., and broadcast with 2,500 watts of power. By the late 1960s, XEGM had increased its power to 10,000 watts days and 5,000 watts nights.

In the late 1980s, the call sign was changed to XEKAM. During this time, XEKAM (frequently referred to in US media as XEK-AM, though the actual XEK-AM was in Nuevo Laredo) was programmed from the United States. It had studios in Hollywood, California. It shut down for a time in 1992 after failing to obtain the necessary FCC permits to originate programming for air on a foreign station.

XEKAM, at the time, was airing a news-talk format in English. Programs included the first talk show devoted to gay issues in the area as well as San Diego Gulls hockey games. When the station was forced off the air, the Gulls went without a radio partner for a month. The loss of U.S. programming sent the station into a tailspin and off the air. Employees went unpaid and the locks at the station's U.S. offices were changed.

In 1998, the concession for XEKAM was transferred to a Radio Fórmula subsidiary.
