= XHPRS-FM =

Radio station in Tecate, Baja California, Mexico

- Tecate, Baja California; Mexico
- Broadcast area: San Diego–Tijuana
- Frequency: 105.7 FM
- Branding: Suave 105.7 FM

Programming
- Language: Spanish
- Format: Classic hits

Ownership
- Owner: Primer Sistema de Noticias; (Media Sports de México, S.A. de C.V.)
- Sister stations: XEWW-AM, XEAZ-AM, XEC-AM, XEPE-AM

History
- First air date: November 16, 1988
- Former call signs: XHBCE-FM (1988–May 2008)
- Former frequencies: 92.1 MHz (1988–2005)
- Call sign meaning: Derived from former sister station XEPRS-AM

Technical information
- Licensing authority: CRT
- Class: C1
- ERP: 8,200 watts
- HAAT: 804.15 meters (2,638.3 ft)
- Transmitter coordinates: 32°18′51″N 116°39′54″W

XHPRS-FM (105.7 MHz) is a commercial FM radio station transmitting from Cerro Bola and Tecate, Baja California, Mexico, and serving the San Diego–Tijuana metropolitan area. The station is owned and operated by Media Sports de México, the legal name of Primer Sistema de Noticias, owned by businessman and former Baja California governor Jaime Bonilla Valdez. It airs a Spanish-language classic hits format known as Suave 105.7 FM.

The station legally moved in from Ensenada in the mid-2000s and used its Cerro Bola signal to target the San Diego market, primarily as a classic hits or variety hits station. The last United States–based operator, Broadcast Company of the Americas, had its programming removed from the station by PSN in December 2018. The station mostly broadcast classic alternative music for the next five years.

== History ==
The concession history for XHPRS begins in Ensenada, Baja California, where the concession for XHBCE-FM was awarded to Gustavo Adolfo Paez y Vejar on November 16, 1988. In the early 2000s, under Roxana Alexanderson Torres, XHBCE began its move into the Tijuana area by soliciting a move to Cerro Grande to the east of Ensenada, coinciding with the station's change to 105.7 MHz, and then to Cerro Bola in Tecate. (XHHC-FM would later restore the 92.1 frequency to use in Ensenada.) By 2005, XHBCE was broadcasting a Spanish-language talk format known as La Pantera, embroiled in an interference dispute with KXRS in Hemet, California that threatened to cut off the station's access to programming delivered from the United States under FCC authorization.

From 2006 to 2008, this station simulcast XEPRS-AM as XX (pronounced Double X) Sports Radio. It aired San Diego Padres games and the entire talk show lineup from the AM station. Before that, it had various musical formats. When XX Sports Radio aired on FM, it helped spread the XEPRS signal to eastern parts of San Diego County. On April 15, 2008, the station broke away from the simulcast, and flipped to oldies/classic hits, branded as "105.7 the Walrus." In May 2008, it received authorization to change its call sign to XHPRS-FM, though it had been using the callsign for some time before.

Logo as Max FM

In May 2014, while promoting their "105 Walrus Days Of Summer", the station began playing fewer songs from the late 1960s and early 1970s while adding more 1980s hits and de-emphasizing the "Walrus" name. Morning co-host John Nolan left the station in July, leaving Kim Morrison to do the show solo. Afternoon host Rich "Brother" Robbin left in August. On August 18, 2014, XHPRS became Max FM, playing classic hits from the mid-1970s through the early 1990s. Jack Diamond became the new morning show co-host. Prior to a 23-year run at WRQX in Washington, D.C., Diamond had done mornings at country-formatted KSON. After one week at XHPRS, Diamond returned to Washington. Once again, Kim Morrison would host the morning show solo. Christina Martinez, formerly at KRTO in Guadalupe, California, hosts afternoons.

On December 12, 2018, the station's Max FM programming, as well as that of sister station XEPE-AM, was taken off-air due to a payment dispute between the station's ownership and Broadcast Company of the Americas. XHPRS's over-the-air transmitter then began carrying classic alternative rock programming, initially "nameless" but later branded as 105.7 Willy FM. There was no imaging or advertising, outside of required Mexican political commercials. Despite being dropped from XHPRS, BCA continued to operate Max FM as an Internet radio station, but began laying off the station's airstaff in January. On February 28, 2019, BCA announced that the Max FM intellectual unit would cease operations. By early 2020, there are Facebook and Twitter pages for "105.7 Willy FM" with a logo but no content.

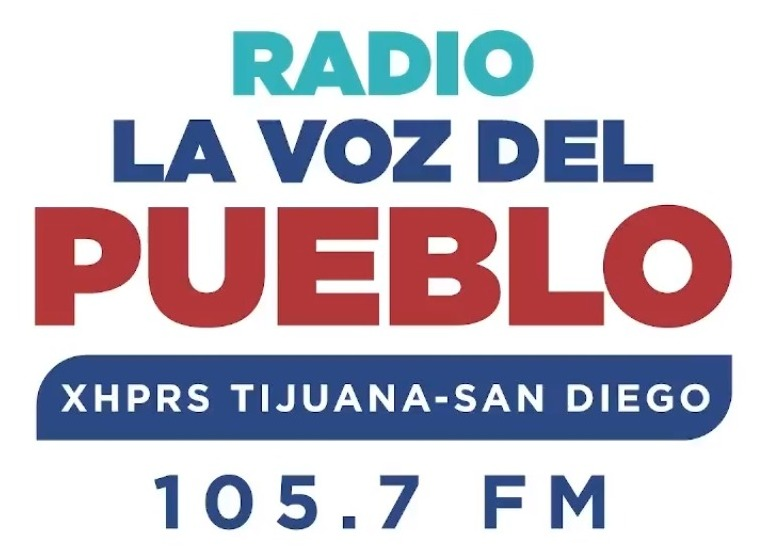
Previous logo

In October 2023, PSN dropped the Willy FM format and switched the station to the same talk programming aired by several of its AM stations and XHBJ-TDT 45.1. After the 2024 elections, XHPRS returned to a musical format, this time classic hits as Suave 105.7 FM ("Smooth").
