= XHTIM-FM =

Regional Mexican radio station in Tijuana

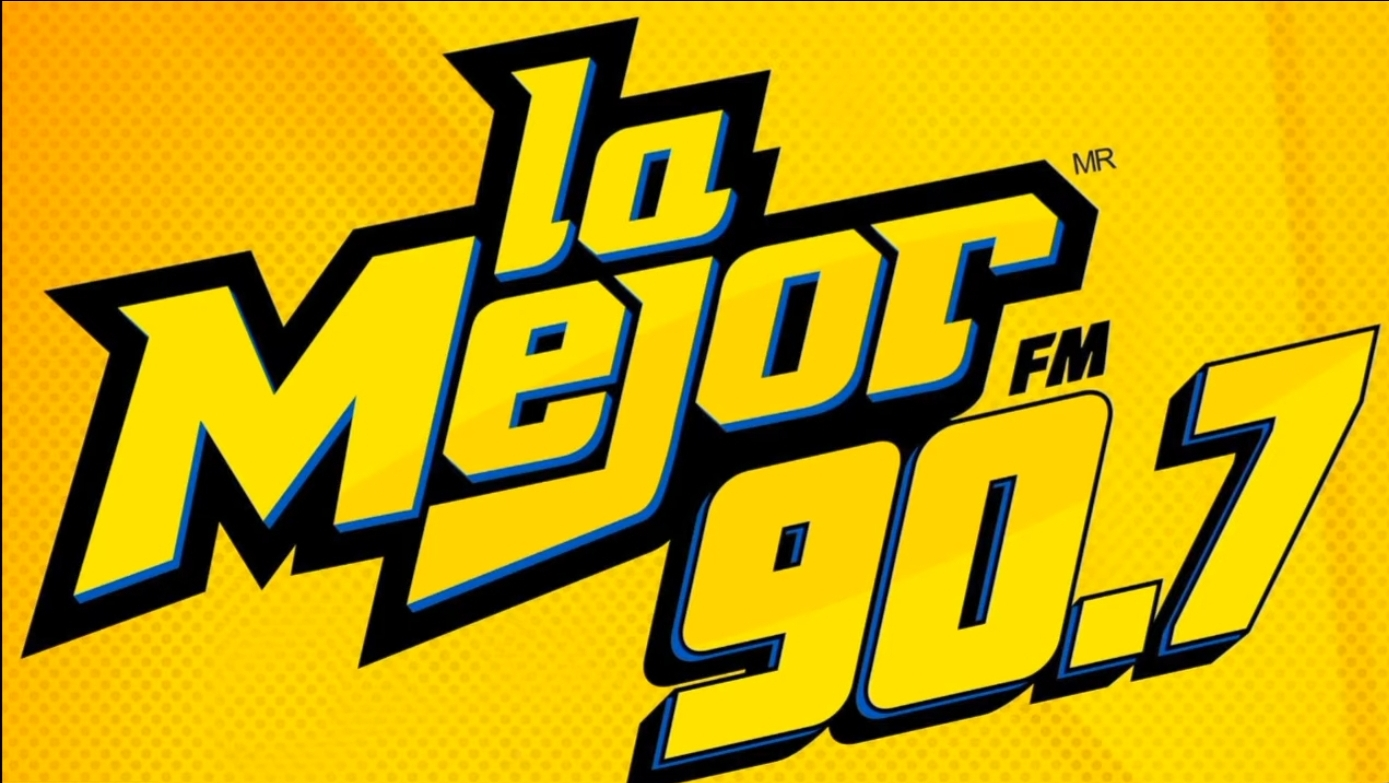
- Tijuana, Baja California; Mexico
- Frequency: 90.7 MHz
- RDS: LA MEJOR
- Branding: La Mejor

Programming
- Format: Regional Mexican

Ownership
- Owner: MVS Radio; (Stereorey México, S.A.)
- Sister stations: XHGLX-FM, XHOCL-FM

History
- First air date: July 1990
- Former call signs: XHTIJ-FM (1990–1999)
- Former frequencies: 97.7 MHz (1990–2010)

Technical information
- Licensing authority: CRT
- Class: B
- ERP: 11,500 watts
- HAAT: 325.8 meters (1,069 ft)
- Transmitter coordinates: 32°28′28.68″N 116°53′56.58″W

Links
- Webcast: Listen live
- Website: lamejor.com.mx/plaza/tijuana/

XHTIM-FM (90.7 FM) is a commercial radio station in Tijuana, Baja California, Mexico. Broadcasting on 90.7 FM, XHTIM is owned by MVS Radio and carries the La Mejor Regional Mexican format.

== History ==
XHTIJ-FM 97.7 came to air in July 1990. It was owned by Carlos Armando Madrazo y Pintado and was eventually sold to Sociedad Mexicana de Radio de Baja California, which in turn sold the station to MVS. It originally broadcast as Estéreo Amistad, broadcasting pop music in Spanish, later rebranding as Sí FM. In 1998, the station flipped to pop music as Pulsar FM, and the next year it became XHTIM-FM with a Regional Mexican format, first as X97.7 and later as La Mejor. (XHTIM-FM had been the call sign of 91.7 FM, which at that time became XHGLX-FM.)

On August 3, 2010, MVS took advantage of the move of XHLNC-FM to 104.9 and took over the 90.7 frequency on higher power. The transmitter was also moved from the MVS studios in the Agua Caliente area to Cerro Colorado.
