= XHGLX-FM =

Radio station in Tijuana, Baja California, Mexico

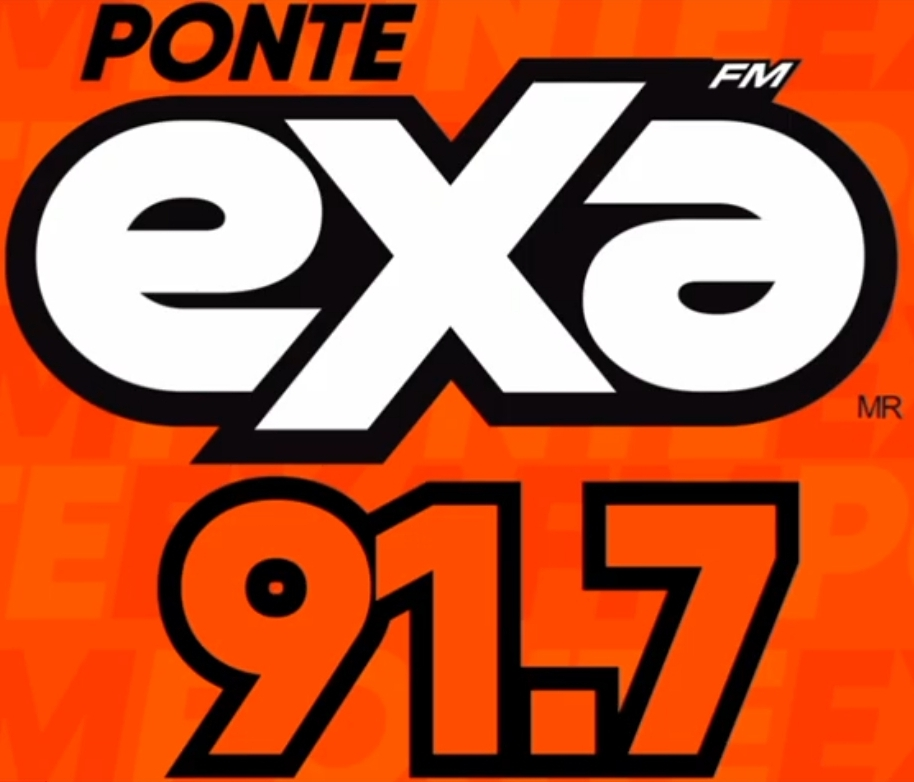
- Tijuana, Baja California; Mexico
- Broadcast area: San Diego–Tijuana
- Frequency: 91.7 MHz
- Branding: Exa FM

Programming
- Format: Spanish and English Top 40 (CHR)

Ownership
- Owner: MVS Radio; (Stereorey México, S.A.)
- Sister stations: XHOCL-FM, XHTIM-FM

History
- First air date: November 11, 1990
- Former call signs: XHTIM-FM
- Former frequencies: 103.3 MHz
- Call sign meaning: "Galaxy"

Technical information
- Licensing authority: CRT
- Class: B
- ERP: 30,000 watts
- HAAT: 229.8 meters (754 ft)
- Transmitter coordinates: 32°29′13.1″N 117°01′12.4″W

Links
- Webcast: Listen Live
- Website: exafm.com/plaza/tijuana/

XHGLX-FM is a commercial radio station in Tijuana, Baja California, Mexico. Broadcasting on 91.7 FM, XHGLX owned by MVS Radio and carries the Exa FM national format.

The programs and most of the music are presented in Spanish, while a number of English-language songs are also heard.

== History ==
XHTIM-FM came to air on November 11, 1990 carrying MVS's Stereorey format, and its early years were filled with major changes. It started broadcasting on 103.3 MHz, the frequency that had been made available on March 16, 1989 in the Diario Oficial de la Federación. However, 103.3 was not an appropriate home for XHTIM, which soon picked up interference complaints from KJQY 103.7. In an attempt to remediate its interference to KJQY, XHTIM found a new home at 91.5 MHz, beginning January 27, 1992. This triggered the wrath of another American station, KUSC in Los Angeles. At the time, KUSC had been attempting to move its facility to Mount Wilson. The XHTIM allotment was short-spaced to KUSC by 23 kilometers, and XHTIM was causing interference to the classical music outlet well into the Los Angeles area. KUSC claimed XHTIM was operating illegally and chastised the Federal Communications Commission for assenting to the SCT's decision to let XHTIM move.

The dispute between KUSC and XHTIM came to an amicable end in 1993. KUSC turned on a new transmitter, and on March 20, XHTIM moved to 91.7 MHz — a change that allowed XHTIM to ramp up power and cleared the interference plaguing KUSC. Later in 1993, XHTIM flipped to grupera as "La Mejor". In 1999 it adopted the name "Galaxy" and a classic hits format, as well as the call sign XHGLX-FM. The Galaxy format was short-lived, with MVS changing the station to its then-new Exa FM format in 2000.

The station's studio facilities moved to San Diego (National City) in May 2006. The first broadcast with the new format aired on May 5, with special guest Yahir. The station was launched by Programming Director Isabel Gonzalez, who exited the company in May 2007.

From November 2010 until September 30, 2011, the station was known as Diego; on October 1, 2011, the station returned to the Exa FM format as MVS moved Diego to XHOCL-FM 99.3, with the Exa studios moving back to Tijuana.

Exa 91.7 old logo
