= XHKT-FM =

Radio station in Tecate, Baja California, Mexico

- Tecate, Baja California; Mexico
- Broadcast area: Tecate-Tijuana, Baja California; San Diego, California
- Frequency: 88.5 MHz
- Branding: La Super KT

Programming
- Format: Regional Mexican
- Affiliations: Radio Fórmula (1990s-present)

Ownership
- Owner: California Medios; (Radio Cuchuma, S.A.)
- Sister stations: XEKAM-AM

History
- First air date: September 13, 1954
- Former call signs: XEKT-AM
- Former frequencies: 1380 kHz (1954–1990); 1390 kHz (1990–2016)
- Call sign meaning: "KT" is pronounced in Spanish like the final two syllables of "Tecate"

Technical information
- Licensing authority: CRT
- Class: A
- ERP: 1 kW
- HAAT: 55.6 m (182 ft)
- Transmitter coordinates: 32°31′45″N 116°41′32″W

Links
- Webcast: Listen live
- Website: californiamedios.com

XHKT-FM is a radio station in Tecate, Baja California, serving Tecate, Tijuana and San Diego, California. It broadcasts on 88.5 FM and is owned by California Medios and affiliated with Radio Fórmula. It carries a Regional Mexican format known as "La Super KT".

== History ==
XEKT came to air on September 13, 1954. It was owned by Francisco Acuña Félix and broadcast on 1380 kHz with 250 watts during the day and 150 watts at night. In 1964, XEKT was sold to Martín Herrera Robles. After he died, XEKT was transferred to his widow, Hortensia Vázquez Vda. de Herrera, in 1977. Radio Cuchuma bought XEKT in 1980.

In the 1990s, XEKT was moved from 1380 to 1390 kHz in order to raise power to 5,000 watts during the day.

It migrated to FM in 2011. XEKT-AM on 1390 kHz was shut down for good in 2016.
