= XESDD-AM =

Radio station in Tijuana, Baja California, Mexico

Currently silent
- Puerto Nuevo, Baja California; Mexico
- Broadcast area: Tijuana
- Frequency: 1030 kHz
- Branding: La Tremenda

Programming
- Format: Silent
- Affiliations: Primer Sistema de Noticias

Ownership
- Owner: Media Sports de México, S.A. de C.V.
- Sister stations: XESS-AM

History
- First air date: November 16, 1988 (concession)
- Former frequencies: 920 kHz (1988–2007)

Technical information
- Licensing authority: FCC
- Class: B
- Power: 5,000 watts
- Transmitter coordinates: 32°14′57″N 116°56′49″W

Links
- Public license information: Public file; LMS

XESDD-AM or La Tremenda is a radio station in Tijuana, Baja California, Mexico. It broadcasts on 1030 kHz from a site along Mexican Federal Highway 1 near Puerto Nuevo in Playas de Rosarito Municipality, shared with sister station XESS-AM 620.

As of August 2023, the station is off the air.

== History ==
The first concession for XESDD was issued for 920 kHz at Ensenada, Baja California in 1988. XESDD was originally owned by Juan José de Jesús Espejo Munguía and broadcast with 2,500 watts during the day and 200 at night.

In 1999, XESDD was bought by Radio S.A., which sold its Baja California stations to Media Sports de México, S.A. de C.V. Under Media Sports, XESDD initially became an ESPN Deportes affiliate, then swapped programming with XESS to become La Tremenda. It also moved from 920 kHz to 1030 kHz in order to resolve interference issues to 910 and 930 kHz.

Previous logo
