= XEMO-AM =

Radio station in Tijuana

- Rancho Vista Hermosa, Baja California, Mexico; Mexico
- Broadcast area: Tijuana, Baja California; San Diego, California
- Frequency: 860 (kHz)
- Branding: La Poderosa 860 AM

Programming
- Language: Spanish
- Format: Spanish oldies into the 70s, 80s and 90s

Ownership
- Owner: Grupo Uniradio; (Radiodifusora X.E.M.O., S.A. de C.V.)
- Sister stations: XHA, XHFG, XHTY

History
- First air date: 1973

Technical information
- Licensing authority: CRT
- Class: B
- Power: 10,000 watts daytime 7,500 watts nighttime

Links
- Webcast: Listen Live
- Website: www.lapoderosa860.com

XEMO-AM (860 AM, La Poderosa 860 AM), is a Spanish-language radio station that is based in Tijuana, but the signal can be heard as far away as Los Angeles. The station plays Spanish oldies music and is the only Spanish language AM station in San Diego that broadcasts music that reaches a far distance. XEMO is operated by San Diego–based Uniradio, Inc., with the concession and transmitter owned by a Mexican company. Uniradio also owns several Spanish language radio stations that serve the San Diego–Tijuana radio market. XEMO is the Spanish flagship radio station of the San Diego Padres.

== History ==
XEMO received its first concession on January 2, 1934. It was owned by Fernando Federico Ferreira. In 1960, the station was knocked off the air by a fire, started when a transmitter short circuited and ignited a rug, that caused $50,000 in damage.

After Ferreira's 1964 death, Gustavo Faist Fernández became the new concessionaire. In turn, Faist transferred the station to Gustavo E. Astiazarán Rosas in 1969. In 1973, the concession was placed under its current concessionaire.
