= XHTY-FM (Baja California) =

Radio station in Tijuana, Baja California, Mexico

- Tijuana, Baja California; Mexico
- Broadcast area: San Diego–Tijuana
- Frequency: 99.7 MHz
- Branding: "La Raza 99.7"

Programming
- Language: Spanish
- Format: Regional Mexican

Ownership
- Owner: Uniradio; (Tijuana FM, S.A. de C.V.)
- Sister stations: XEMO, XHA, XHFG

History
- First air date: 1979
- Former call signs: XHB-FM (to 1981), XHBCN-FM, (1981-97), XHAMR-FM (1997-99)

Technical information
- Licensing authority: CRT
- Class: C1
- ERP: 30,000 watts
- HAAT: 327.4 meters (1,074 ft)

Links
- Website: raza997.com

XHTY-FM is a commercial radio station located in Tijuana, Baja California, broadcasting to the San Diego-Tijuana metropolitan area on 99.7 FM. XHTY-FM airs a regional Mexican music format branded as "La Raza" which in English translates to "The Race."

XHTY is owned and operated by Uniradio, which operates stations in Baja California and Sonora, though it is programmed from Uniradio's San Diego studios.

== History ==
XHB-FM received its broadcast license in December 1964, specifying operation on 92.9 MHz but soon after moving to 99.7. In October 1981, XHB became XHBCN-FM. By 1990, the station had a romántica format branded "Radio Amor".

In the late 1990s, XHBCN engaged in two call sign changes. It became XHAMR-FM in 1997, and two years later, it became XHTY-FM, taking the original call sign of its sister station, which became XHA-FM. The same year, XHTY and XHA-FM swapped formats, with the Radio Amor romantic format moved from 99.7 to 94.5 and the La Invasora Regional Mexican format moved to 99.7. In 2005, the Tijuana version of La Invasora moved to XHA-FM, and XHTY began broadcasting the San Diego version of La Invasora.
