= XHOCL-FM =

Radio station in Tijuana, Baja California, Mexico

- Tijuana, Baja California; Mexico
- Frequency: 99.3 MHz
- RDS: GLOBO 99.3 - MAS EXITOS TODO EL DIA
- Branding: Globo

Programming
- Format: Spanish AC

Ownership
- Owner: MVS Radio; (Frecuencia Modulada del Noroeste, S.A.)
- Sister stations: XHGLX-FM, XHTIM-FM

History
- First air date: June 5, 1975 (concession)
- Former call signs: XHKY-FM, XHHCR-FM

Technical information
- Licensing authority: CRT
- Class: B1
- ERP: 25,000 watts
- HAAT: 143 m (469 ft)
- Transmitter coordinates: 32°30′27″N 117°02′16″W

Links
- Webcast: Listen live
- Website: fmglobo.com/plaza/tijuana/

XHOCL-FM is a radio station on 99.3 FM in Tijuana, Baja California, Mexico. It is owned by MVS Radio and carries its Globo Spanish AC format. The station's studios are located in the Agua Caliente neighborhood of Tijuana, with its transmitter on a tower on Av. Club 20–30.

== History ==
The concession history for XHOCL begins in the late 1960s, with tentative approval to establish XHQS-FM on 96.1 MHz. This station would have been owned by XHQS, S.A., in turn owned by Guillermo Núñez Keith. Instead, XHQS, S.A., part of Víctor Díaz's Califórmula Broadcasting, received the concession for XHKY-FM 95.7 on June 5, 1975. In 1985, the station became as "Fiesta Mexicana" with a Regional Mexican format.

In the late 1980s, a binational frequency conflict led to a series of changes at XHKY. XHKY raised its power, causing interference to KKOS, a radio station on 95.9 MHz at Carlsbad, California. Ultimately, KKOS and XHKY reached a deal, which was agreed to by the FCC and SCT; on September 15, 1995, XHKY moved to 99.3 at 25,000 watts, KKOS moved to 95.7 at 25,000 watts, and the previous occupant of 99.3, XHATE-FM Tecate, moved to 95.3 MHz, and XHKY rebranded as "X99".

In 1998, XHKY changed its callsign to XHHCR-FM and flipped to "Hot Country Radio (branded as XHCR on air)"; the XHCR callsign was not available as it was already in use by a Morelia, Michoacán, FM outlet. In 2002, XHHCR was sold to Clear Channel Communications and its Mexican affiliate XETRA Comunicaciones, S.A. de C.V. The new ownership changed the name of the station to "Country Music Bob" while maintaining the format. On January 5, 2004, the country music moved to American station 95.7, and the "Kool" oldies format moved from 95.7 to 99.3 with a new call sign, XHOCL-FM (referred to as XOCL). At 6 a.m. on September 1, 2005, the station flipped to Spanish language oldies known as "La Preciosa".

Clear Channel was forced to sell the stations it operated in Mexico after a 2003 FCC ruling that ruled those stations counted against US ownership caps. As a consequence, XHOCL was sold to MVS Radio. On August 1, 2007 the station flipped to MVS's "La Mejor" grupera format. On October 1, 2011, XHOCL flipped to Spanish adult hits, branded as "Diego 99.3" as sister station XHTIM-FM 90.7 took on the La Mejor format.

On January 21, 2019, XHOCL flipped to Spanish AC, as MVS brought the "FM Globo" brand to Tijuana, replacing Diego. Globo is also heard in the Imperial Valley and Mexicali on XHPF-FM.
