= KSDO =

Radio station in San Diego, California, United States

- San Diego, California; United States
- Broadcast area: San Diego County; Tijuana
- Frequency: 1130 kHz
- Branding: Radio Inspiración

Programming
- Format: Spanish religious programming

Ownership
- Owner: Hi-Favor Broadcasting, LLC
- Sister stations: KEZY, KLTX

History
- First air date: January 24, 1947
- Former call signs: KYOR (1947–1949)
- Call sign meaning: San Diego

Technical information
- Licensing authority: FCC
- Facility ID: 51166
- Class: B
- Power: Licensed for 10,000 watts day and night from a directional antenna system no longer in use, and operating since 2016 under a Special Temporary Authority for 2,500 watts, non-directional, day and night
- Transmitter coordinates: 32°43′51″N 117°04′59″W

Links
- Public license information: Public file; LMS
- Webcast: Listen live
- Website: radioinspiracion.com

KSDO is a radio station in San Diego, California, broadcasts at 1130 KHz. The station is licensed for 10,000 watts of power from a directional antenna system, but has been operating since 2016 with 2,500 watts non-directional from a different site. It is owned by Hi-Favor Broadcasting, and airs a Spanish Christian format branded "Radio Inspiración".

== History ==
=== Early years ===
The station began broadcasting January 24, 1947, and held the call sign KYOR. It was owned by Silver Gate Broadcasting, and ran 250 watts during daytime hours only.

In 1949, the station was sold to San Diego Broadcasting for $75,000, and its call sign was changed to KSDO. The new owners were required to divest themselves of one station, so KSDO suspended operations. The station had a permit to increase daytime power and add nighttime operations, and San Diego Broadcasting intended to surrender the license of AM 1510 KUSN once construction of KSDO's new facilities was complete. In 1950, the station resumed operations, with its daytime power increased to 5,000 watts and nighttime operations added, running 1,000 watts.

In 1959, the station was sold to Gordon Broadcasting for $500,000. The station aired a beautiful music format in the 1960s.

=== News talk era ===
By the early 1970s, KSDO had adopted news-talk format. In 1972, the station was sold to Generation II Radio San Diego, a subsidiary of Firestone Communications, for $2.5 million. In 1976, the station was sold to Pacific and Southern, a subsidiary of Combined Communications, for $1,576,000. Gannett purchased Combined Communications in 1979. Its power was increased to 10,000 watts the same year.

Laurence Gross hosted a midday talk show on KSDO from 1975 to 1983. From 1986 to 1997, former San Diego mayor Roger Hedgecock hosted a program on the station. Danuta Soderman hosted Danuta Time in the late 1980s. Michael Reagan hosted a show from 1989 to 1992. It was an affiliate of NBC Talknet in the 1980s. Syndicated hosts on KSDO over the years included Rush Limbaugh, G. Gordon Liddy, Larry King, and Tom Leykis. It was also the flagship station of the San Diego Chargers during its "Air Coryell" years. As a talk station, KSDO's ratings were consistently among the top ten stations in San Diego, through 1996.

In 1996, Gannett traded KSDO and five other stations to Jacor Communications for WTSP CBS 10 in Tampa. In 1997, Roger Hedgecock and Rush Limbaugh were moved to KOGO, and the station switched to a financial news-talk format, with programming from Bloomberg and The Wall Street Journal. Ray Lucia hosted middays, later moving to mornings. Syndicated talk shows aired at night. In 2000, syndicated talk programs replaced most financial programming. Hosts included Michael Savage, Phil Hendrie, Lionel, and Larry King. That year, the station was sold to Chase Radio Properties. In late 2001, financial talk programming began to again make up the bulk of the station's daytime schedule.

=== Spanish Christian era ===
In 2003, the station was sold to Hi-Favor Broadcasting for $10 million. The station adopted a Spanish language Christian format as an affiliate of Radio Nueva Vida. By 2019, the station disaffiliated from Radio Nueva Vida, but continued to air a Spanish-language Christian format as Radio Inspiración.

In 2016, Hi-Favor Broadcasting obtained a Special Temporary Authority (STA) from the FCC to broadcast with 2,500 watts from a single non-directional wire dropped from a cable hung from the tower of KLSD radio, while a search is conducted for an alternate site. The STA has been extended twice each year since it was originally granted.
