= XEHC-AM =

Radio station in Tijuana, Baja California, Mexico

- Tijuana, Baja California; Mexico
- Broadcast area: San Diego–Tijuana
- Frequency: 1470 kHz
- Branding: Radio Bahía

Programming
- Format: News/talk and Music

Ownership
- Owner: Radio Cadena Enciso; (B.C. Impulsora de Radio, S.A. de C.V.)
- Sister stations: XEXX-AM

History
- First air date: 1943
- Former call signs: XEAU-AM, XEBBC-AM, XERCN-AM (–2025)

Technical information
- Licensing authority: CRT
- Class: B
- Power: 10,000 watts day; 5,000 watts night

Links
- Webcast: Listen live
- Website: rceradio.com

XEHC-AM (1470 kHz) is a radio station in Tijuana, Baja California, Mexico. The station is operated by Radio Cadena Enciso and known as Radio Bahía, which along with the call sign is a reference to the former XEHC-AM in Ensenada.

== History ==
XEAU-AM 1470 received its first concession in 1943. It soon after affiliated to the Radio Cadena Nacional network, based at 1110 AM in Mexico City, which then bore the XERCN call sign. Radio Cadena Nacional was owned by Rafael Cutberto Navarro (who also created the Kaliman radio drama), and thus the callsign both represented the network and his own name.

When Broadcasting Baja California bought the station sometime in the 1950s or early 1960s, the station became XEBBC-AM and then, after the Mexico City station was sold and its callsign changed, XERCN-AM.

Before it became operated by Uniradio, XERCN broadcast a wide variety of programming, from children's programming (La isla infantil de Beto Grillo) to public affairs programming (Política y Políticos), but it was best known for its radionovelas, produced through the network's production arm, Producciones RCN. Many of these radionovelas are still being heard throughout the world to this day. Among the most famous were its productions of "Las aventuras de Kaliman" and the Porfirio Cadena saga. It was also one of the few stations in Mexico that transmitted old episodes of the Cuban radio comedy "La tremenda corte."

Logo as Radio Hispana 1470

Logo as RCN 1470

On December 17, 2025, the Telecommunications Regulatory Commission (CRT) approved a call sign change for this station to XEHC-AM. The CRT authorized the transfer of the station's concession to B.C. Impulsora de Radio, S.A. de C.V., in 2026.
