= Eduardo Ortega =

Mexican-American baseball broadcaster

Eduardo Ortega (born 1963) is a Mexican-American baseball broadcaster. He has worked as the Spanish language broadcaster of the San Diego Padres of Major League Baseball (MLB) since 1987.

Born in Tijuana, Mexico, Ortega began announcing baseball for the Potros de Tijuana in his hometown when he was 20 years old. Four years later, he was hired by the Padres. He works for ESPN Deportes during the MLB postseason, and has also announced the MLB All-Star Game and World Baseball Classic. He was a finalist for the Ford C. Frick Award in the 2013 balloting, and was again a finalist in 2014. During the MLB offseason, Ortega also works as a broadcaster for the Águilas de Mexicali of the Mexican Pacific League.

Ortega is a member of the Tijuana Sports Hall of Fame, inducted in 2004, and the Hispanic Heritage Baseball Museum Hall of Fame, inducted in 2013. In 1998, Ortega was named Tijuana’s sports ambassador.
