= KYDO =

Air 1 radio station in Campo, California, serving San Diego

Coordinates: 32.679°N 116.517°W

- Campo, California; United States
- Broadcast area: San Diego, California
- Frequency: 96.1 MHz
- Branding: "Air1"

Programming
- Format: Worship music
- Affiliations: Air1

Ownership
- Owner: Educational Media Foundation

History
- First air date: September 10, 1981
- Former call signs: KSIQ (1981–2014)

Technical information
- Licensing authority: FCC
- Facility ID: 63471
- Class: B1
- ERP: 25,000 watts (main); 700 watts (repeater)
- HAAT: 31 meters (102 ft) (main)
- Repeater: 96.1 KYDO-FM1 Santee, California

Links
- Public license information: Public file; LMS
- Webcast: Listen Live
- Website: www.air1.com

KYDO (96.1 FM, "Air 1") is a radio station licensed to Campo, California, and broadcasting to the San Diego radio market. The station has a main transmitter site near Lake Morena, just west of Campo. The station also uses KYDO-FM1, a 700 watt booster transmitter on Mount San Miguel, and licensed to Santee.

KYDO is owned by the Educational Media Foundation, based in Rocklin, California. KYDO airs an internet-based Worship music format, and is the Air 1 network affiliate for the southern San Diego area. No local programming originates here as the station broadcasts complete wall-to-wall syndication. KYDO is considered a "move in" station, because it started in Brawley in California's Imperial Valley before moving closer to San Diego.

== History ==
=== KSIQ in Brawley, California (1981–2009) ===
This station's history began on February 12, 1981, when a construction permit was issued, calling for a 50 kW station at 96.1 FM, licensed to Brawley. The station was assigned the KSIQ call letters on March 25 of that year.

On September 10 of that year, KSIQ signed on. It aired a Top 40 format and was called "SI-96" (pronounced "SEE-96"), using the middle letters of its call sign. "SI" stood for the Spanish-language word for "yes." This was meant to attract the large Hispanic audience in the Imperial Valley and to have them interpret the name as "Yes-96." The station would later rebrand as Q96, using the last letter of its callsign. During its time in the Imperial Valley, the station's signal was heard as far east as Yuma, Arizona, and was also popular across the Mexico–United States border in Mexicali, a city of more than half a million people in the state of Baja California.

=== Move to San Diego Market (2010) ===
While KSIQ was successful in its home territory, the Imperial Valley is considered a small market in radio. In early 2010, KSIQ announced that it was moving to San Diego, a much larger market with the potential to increase KSIQ's advertising revenue. The only on-air DJs who moved with the station were morning host Tony Driskill and afternoon host Stacy Lynn. The personalities moved again to Cherry Creek's Lake Tahoe cluster at the end of 2010, voice-tracking to KSIQ in the process, At this point, all of the programs were syndicated, with no local talent whatsoever.

KSIQ had been broadcasting at 50,000 watts in Brawley, but the move to Campo required the station to drop its power in half. The station began broadcasting to the San Diego area from its new main transmitter and booster on March 17, 2010, continuing its Contemporary Hit Radio format. Its moniker at the time, "San Diego's New Q - Q96," referenced San Diego's legendary KCBQ, a popular Top 40 station in the 1960s, 70s and 80s. The main transmitter is located east of Lake Morena, just west of Campo. To better cover San Diego, a booster station was also set up, also on 96.1 MHz. It is located atop Mount San Miguel along with several other FM and TV transmitters, including those of television stations KUSI and KNSD. The booster is licensed for 700 watts effective radiated power.

=== Booster site problems (2010–2012) ===
The booster site went through a long period of non-operation and problems from late October 2010 through July 2011. On early morning October 22, 2010 the booster transmitter went silent, transmitting a dead carrier. Cheery Creek Radio, the owners of KSIQ, applied to the Federal Communications Commission (FCC) for a Silent STA: A "special temporary authority" to retain their license despite not being on the air. The application stated that the T1 link to the booster transmitter failed, that troubleshooting was underway, and that they intended to return to the air as soon as possible.

On Tuesday, November 16, 2010, KSIQ was heard in San Diego again. But on January 24, 2011 the San Diego Radio blog reported that KSIQ's relay on Mount San Miguel was not operating, and the signal from the main transmitter in Campo was not reaching San Diego.

On March 31, 2011, the station's management requested special temporary authority (STA) to operate the booster transmitter with temporary facilities from an alternate site. The site proposed was just west of Sweetwater Reservoir, about four miles west of the Mount San Miguel location. The STA request also included a significant increase in transmitter power for the booster, from 700 watts ERP to 5,000 watts ERP, but also noted that the new site would be at just 137 meters above sea level (compared to 785 meters for the booster site on Mount San Miguel) and that the new antenna's height would be nine meters below the average terrain. This request was granted on April 5.

The station intended to file an application for permanent use of the new site if it proved successful. However, the new site and increased power did not improve reception. The old booster site on Mount San Miguel resumed operation in July 2011 with 700 watts ERP.

On May 24, 2012, KSIQ's booster went off the air yet again. This was simultaneous with KPBS-FM's report that their transmitter, also on San Miguel, had lost power, apparently due to a brush fire that affected the incoming lines. However KPBS's signal was restored the next day, while KSIQ's booster was not back on the air until July 11, 2012, almost two months later.

=== EMF Acquisition, Format changes (2013–present) ===
On November 1, 2013, Cherry Creek Radio announced its intention to sell KSIQ to the Educational Media Foundation, operator of two Christian radio networks, K-Love, which plays Contemporary Christian music, and Air 1, which leaned toward Christian rock at the time of the announcement. "Q96" signed off on November 6, at 5:45 pm, and entered a fifteen minute period of silence. At 6:00pm that night, KSIQ flipped to Christian rock and began airing programming from Air 1. The sale was finalized on January 27, 2014 at a price of $1 million. KSIQ became KYDO that same day. With the acquisition, this station became the first religious station on FM to reach the San Diego metropolitan Area, and the first to reach Downtown. The station shifted to CCM in 2017. EMF also acquired KYDQ, a station in North County at 92.1 FM, and converted it to a repeater station on November 16 of that year, the KYDQ calls resembled KYDO.

On January 1, 2019, at midnight, KYDO, like all other Air 1 affiliates, flipped to its present worship music format.

=== Ownership History ===
- Kurt Leptich (1981–1984)
- Stodelle Broadcasting (1984–1999)
- Commonwealth Communications, LLC (1999–2003)
- Cherry Creek Radio, LLC (2003–2014)
- Educational Media Foundation (2014–present)

=== KSIQ Program directors ===
- Kurt Leptich (1982–1984)
- Tony Driskill (1984–1993)
- Dan Watson (1993–1996)
- Tony Driskill (1996–2003)
- Vincent "Toby" Salgado (2003–2008)
- Tony Driskill (2008–2010)
- Alejandra Torres (2010–2013)
