= KLVJ (FM) =

K-Love radio station in Encinitas, California

- Encinitas, California; United States
- Broadcast area: San Diego County
- Frequency: 102.1 MHz (HD Radio)
- Branding: K-Love

Programming
- Format: Contemporary Christian music
- Subchannels: HD2: K-Love Eras; HD3: Radio Nueva Vida
- Network: K-Love

Ownership
- Owner: Educational Media Foundation

History
- First air date: January 20, 1962
- Former call signs: KUDE-FM (1962–1977); KJFM (1977–1984); KEZL (1984–1986); KGMG (1986); KGMG-FM (1986–1991); KIOZ (1991–1996); KXST (1996–2002); KPRI (2002–2015)
- Call sign meaning: K-Love

Technical information
- Licensing authority: FCC
- Facility ID: 51503
- Class: B
- ERP: 26,500 watts
- HAAT: 209 meters (686 ft)
- Transmitter coordinates: 32°50′17″N 117°15′00″W

Links
- Public license information: Public file; LMS
- Webcast: Listen live
- Website: klove.com

KLVJ (102.1 MHz) is a non-commercial FM radio station licensed to Encinitas, California, United States, and serving San Diego County. The station is owned by Educational Media Foundation and broadcasts a contemporary Christian music format as an affiliate of the K-Love network. KLVJ (then KPRI)'s studios were previously located in the Sorrento Valley district in north San Diego. Prior to 2015, the station, holding the KPRI call letters, was locally owned by Compass Radio Group and broadcast an adult album alternative format. On September 28, it was announced that Compass sold KPRI to EMF; the station began carrying K-Love programming the same day.

== History ==
The station was first licensed to Oceanside, California as KXST; the city of license later changed to Encinitas.

=== KPRI - 'Capri-by-the-Sea' ===
When it first went on the air in the 1950s at 106.5 FM, the station billed itself as "KPRI: Capri-by-the-Sea", a middle of the road and jazz station with studios on 5th Avenue in San Diego. This early version of KPRI featured popular DJs like Rod Page and George Manning. KPRI continued with its MOR format, supplemented by a progressive rock show hosted by pioneering underground disc jockey Steve Brown (under the name "OB Jetty"). Finally, in May 1968, KPRI switched to a full-time progressive rock format. The lineup included Gabriel Wisdom, Fred Nurk, Dana Jones, and Joe Chandler. Peter Franklin (with British accent) was an early program director. Later additions to the air staff included Jerry Lubin, Adrian Bolt, The Kapusta Kid, Barrance Q Zakar, and Larry Himmel. Jim Lanter (known on-air as "Jim LaFawn") was the program director from 1971 to 1973; he later worked at KLOS in Los Angeles. In the early 1970s, Gerry Gazlay was the station's news director. Larry Shushan owned the station until 1971, when he sold it to Southwestern Broadcasting.

In 1973, KPRI hired Michael Harrison as PD. He installed a more mainstream album oriented rock format which influenced many other stations around the country. That same year, Gazley left KPRI to become a newscaster for competitor KGB-AM-FM; Gabriel Wisdom, Larry Himmel, and Barrance Q Zakar eventually followed him. KPRI and KGB-FM and battled for ratings supremacy throughout the 1970s and into the 1980s. Ultimately, KPRI lost the ratings war to KGB-FM.

=== KPRI - 'Independent Radio' ===
On January 9, 1984, KPRI changed its call letters and format. The last song that the station played as KPRI was "The End" by the Doors. Since then, the 106.5 FM frequency undergone several identity changes. According to David Tanny, operator of San Diego Radio News: "The KPRI that is back is basically the station that used to be KCBQ-FM ten years ago on 105.3 until it shifted radio transmitter locations from San Diego to Oceanside's 102.1 in a complex deal swap. In 2002, the station at 102.1 picked up the KPRI call sign when that became available. It was KXST from 1996 to 2002 between those times". While operating as KXST, the station called itself "Sets-102" and its programming featured sets of two or more songs by the same artist. That format was dropped with the switch to the KPRI call letters in 2002.

KPRI's transmission emitted a city-grade signal that covered most of San Diego County, but due to the topography of the county, there were certain areas the station served better than others. San Diego's affluent North County Coastal areas received the signal without interruption, while areas in main San Diego such as Pacific Beach or La Jolla had degraded "in home" reception due to interference caused by Mount Soledad. Previous ownership had set up rebroadcasters scattered across San Diego to improve transmission of the station, but because those created as many problems as they solved, KPRI stopped using some of them in 1997. On February 13, 2008, KPRI moved its transmitter to Mount Soledad. In 2014, the owners turned down an $8 million offer to sell the station.

From 1998 through 2015, the station operated under an adult album alternative (AAA) format. Believed the only AAA station in San Diego, and one of the few stations offering the format across the entire state, KPRI became known for its eclectic playlist. KPRI held various listener appreciation concerts, hosting artists such as Adele, Ed Sheeran, Imagine Dragons, and Norah Jones, as well as sponsoring the Green Flash concert series, held at Birch Aquarium.

=== KLVJ - 'K-LOVE' ===
On the morning of September 28, 2015, KPRI's 20 employees were told that they had been laid off, and that the station had been sold to the Educational Media Foundation. At 5PM, after playing Bob Dylan's "Forever Young" as its final song, KPRI flipped to contemporary Christian music from EMF's K-Love network. Owner Hughes explained that KPRI had been a "true labor of love". He stated, "I thank each and every one who has helped us create and sustain a truly amazing radio station." Hughes had noted that the independent ownership had made KPRI difficult to operate profitably, as other stations in the market are owned by conglomerates in clusters of multiple stations each, and enjoy financial synergies as a result of their scale.

The sale to EMF, reportedly valued at $12 million, was subject to approval by the FCC, and was consummated on January 15, 2016. KPRI is EMF's third and largest station in the greater San Diego area, behind KKLJ Julian (which also airs K-Love) and KYDO Campo (which airs sister network Air1).

On October 27, 2015, KPRI changed callsigns to KLVJ.
