= XHHIT-FM (Baja California) =

Radio station in Tecate/Tijuana, Baja California, Mexico

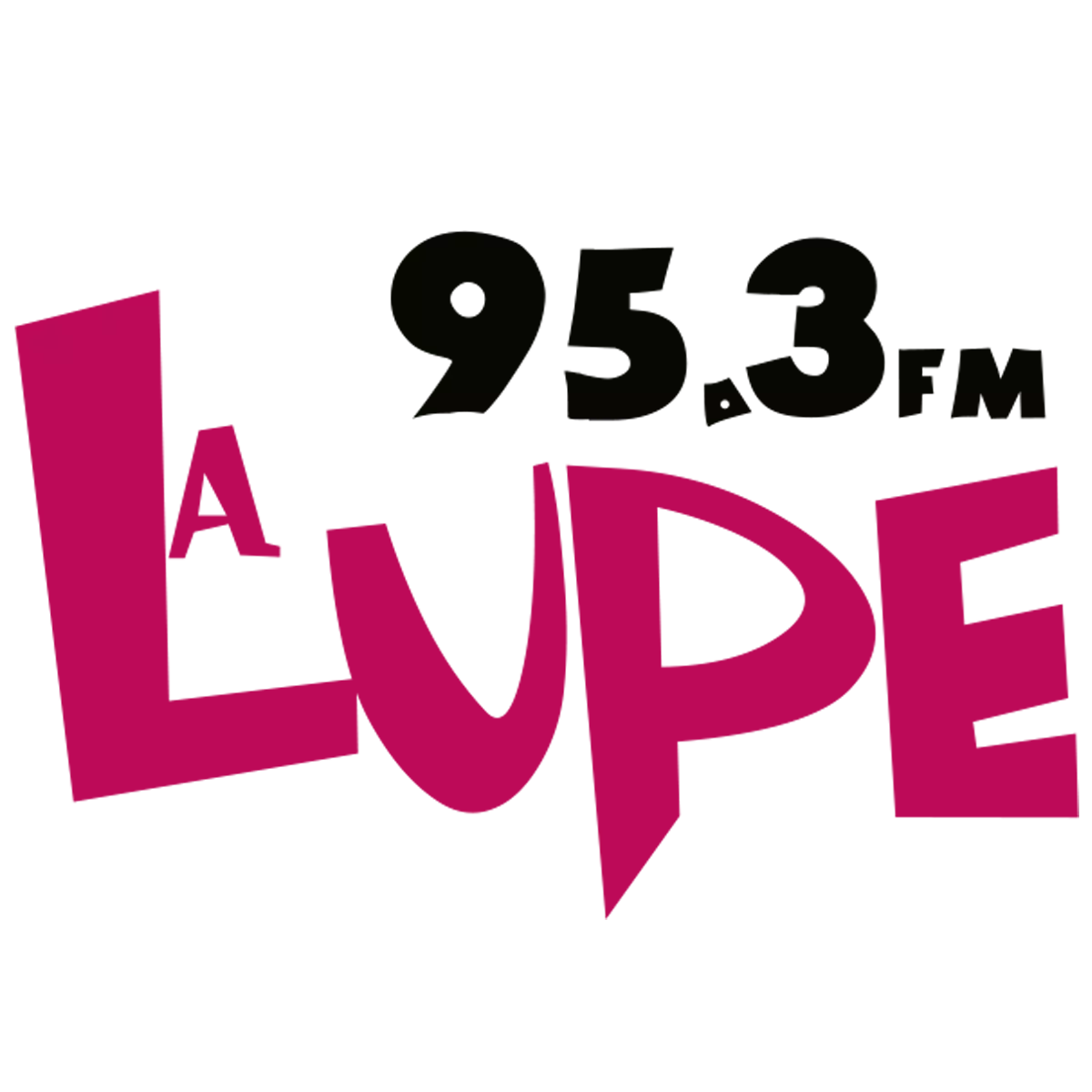
- Tecate, Baja California; Mexico
- Broadcast area: Tijuana, Baja California
- Frequency: 95.3 MHz (HD Radio)
- Branding: La Lupe

Programming
- Format: Variety hits

Ownership
- Owner: Multimedios Radio; (Radio Triunfos, S.A. de C.V.)

History
- First air date: November 1, 1988
- Former call signs: XHATE-FM (1988–2004)
- Former frequencies: 99.3 MHz (1988–1995)
- Call sign meaning: "Hit"

Technical information
- Licensing authority: CRT
- Class: C1
- ERP: 12,000 watts
- HAAT: 758.4 meters (2,488 ft)
- Transmitter coordinates: 32°18′49″N 116°39′53″W

Links
- Webcast: Listen live
- Website: mmradio.com

XHHIT-FM is a commercial radio station located in Tecate, Baja California, Mexico broadcasting to the Tijuana, Baja California area on 95.3 FM. XHHIT is owned by Multimedios Radio and carries a variety hits format known as La Lupe.

== History ==
XHATE-FM received its concession on November 7, 1988. It was owned by Enrique Regules Uriegas, who owned several stations for Multimedios. At the time, it was carrying Multimedios's Stereo Hits format.

On September 15, 1995, XHATE moved from 99.3 to 95.3 MHz. The move was part of a bigger frequency shuffle that moved XHKY-FM to 99.3 and US station KKOS to 95.7.

On May 18, 2004, XHATE became XHHIT-FM. In 2005, it became La Caliente with a Regional Mexican format. In 2012, it switched to news/talk as Milenio Radio, reverting to La Caliente in 2014.

On August 31, 2020, it changed its format to La Lupe, with adult hits in Spanish.
