= XEXX-AM =

Radio station in Tijuana, Baja California, Mexico

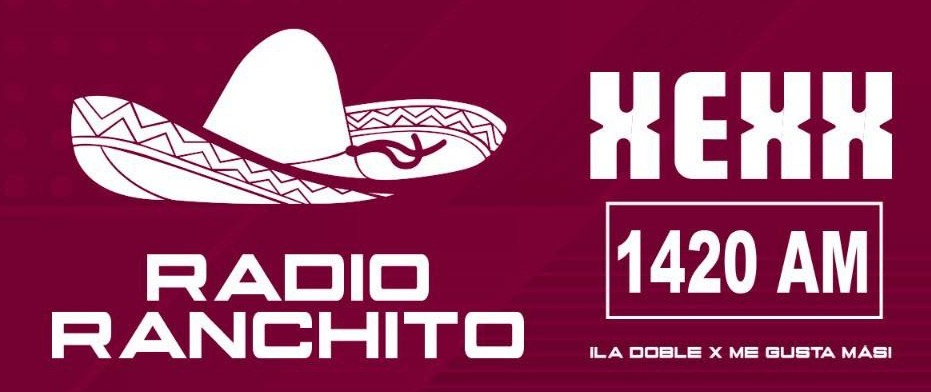
- Tijuana, Baja California; Mexico
- Broadcast area: San Diego–Tijuana
- Frequency: 1420 kHz
- Branding: Radio Ranchito

Programming
- Format: Regional Mexican

Ownership
- Owner: Grupo Radiorama; (Operadora de Radio y Televisión, S.A.)
- Operator: Radio Cadena Enciso
- Sister stations: XHRST-FM, by ownership; XERCN-AM, by operator

History
- First air date: 1946

Technical information
- Licensing authority: CRT
- Class: B
- Power: 10,000 watts (daytime); 2,000 watts (nighttime)

Links
- Webcast: Listen live

XEXX-AM (Radio Ranchito) is a commercial radio station on 1420 AM in Tijuana, Baja California, Mexico, broadcasting to the San Diego–Tijuana radio market. The station is owned by Grupo Radiorama and operated by Radio Cadena Enciso.

== History ==
The original XEXX concession was awarded to Operadora de Radio y Televisión, S.A., in 1946. In the 1950s, the station was owned by Jose J. Clark and was powered at 2,000 watts. The daytime power was boosted in the early 2000s to 10,000 watts, allowing XEXX to cover Tijuana's sprawling suburbs and much of San Diego during daylight hours. Prior programming included Red W Interactiva and Radio Fórmula.

In 2018, PSN began operating XEXX, though primarily simulcasting other PSN-owned stations. Under Audiorama operation, it was "Vida" and broadcast a Spanish-language oldies and soft adult contemporary radio format. With the PSN operation, the station broadcast the complete programming of ESPN Deportes Radio (in XESS it was partial) with a newscast in the morning produced by the owner Grupo Audiorama. Following the end of ESPN Deportes broadcasts on September 8, the station became a full-time affiliate of the TUDN Radio network. This continued until 2022.
