= Puerto Nuevo, Baja California =

City in Baja California, Mexico

- City
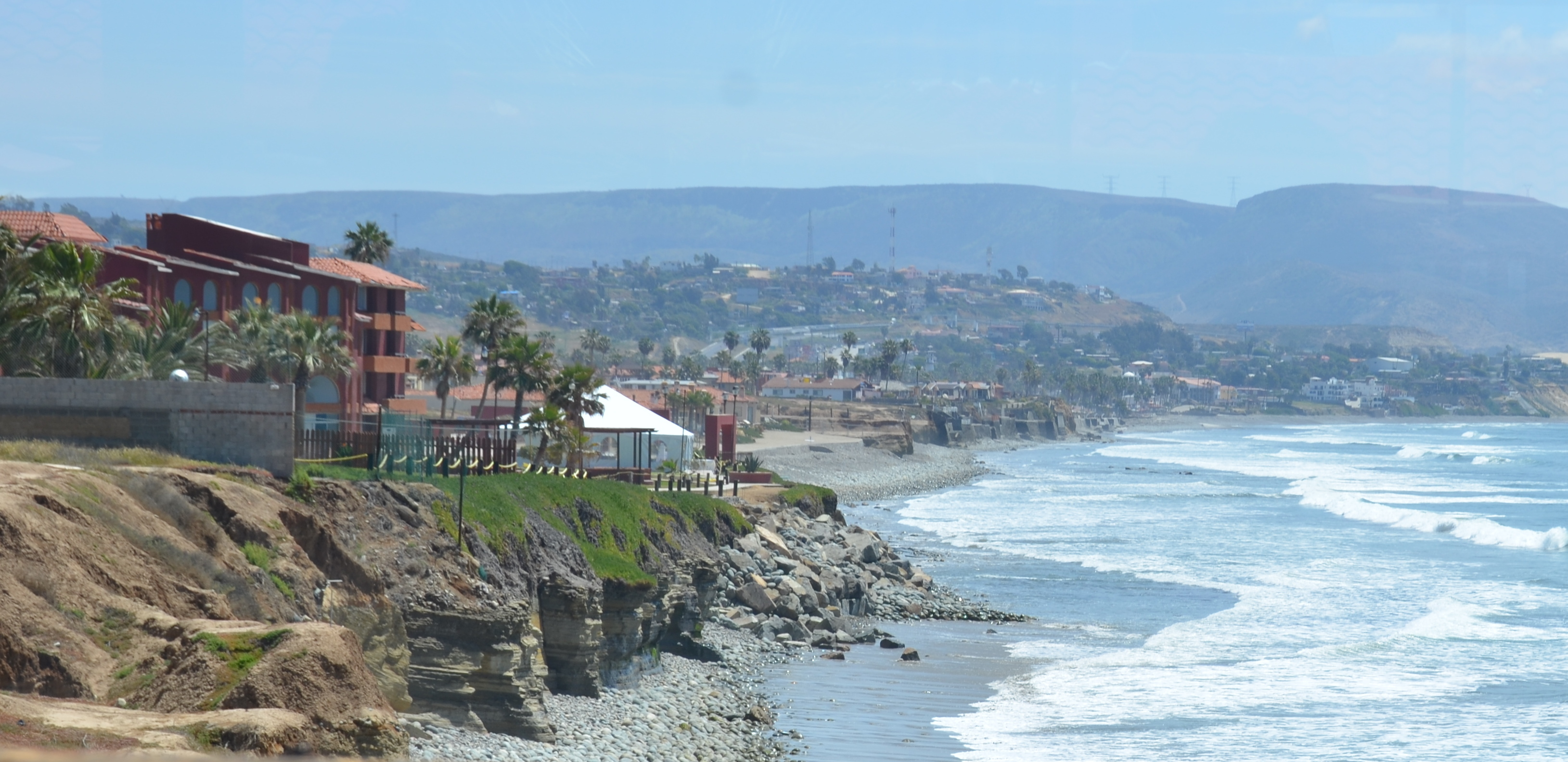
- The Pacific Coast along Puerto Nuevo

- Location in Mexico
- Country: Mexico
- State: Baja California
- Municipality: Mexicali

Puerto Nuevo is a town in Playas de Rosarito Municipality, Baja California, located on the Pacific Coast of Mexico. The 2010 census reported a population of 135 inhabitants. Puerto Nuevo is famous as the "Lobster Village" of Baja California.

== Geography ==
Puerto Nuevo is a 10-minute drive south of the town of Rosarito Beach, and roughly 40 miles (64 km) north of Ensenada.

== Tourism ==
There are several hotels in the area and dozens of restaurants, mostly featuring lobster, the local speciality. The town itself contains the usual shops and pharmacies found in most towns.

The famous surf break known as "Captain Ron's" lies 5 minutes north of Puerto Nuevo.
