= KKLJ =

Radio Nueva Vida station in Julian, California

- Julian, California; United States
- Broadcast area: San Diego, California
- Frequency: 100.1 MHz
- Branding: Radio Nueva Vida

Programming
- Language: Spanish
- Format: Religious programming
- Affiliations: Radio Nueva Vida

Ownership
- Owner: Educational Media Foundation
- Operator: The Association for Community Education

History
- First air date: October 23, 1991
- Former call signs: KBNN (1987–1995); KLVW (1995–1997); KLVJ (1997–2015); KPRI (2015–2017)

Technical information
- Licensing authority: FCC
- Facility ID: 49854
- Class: A
- ERP: 110 watts
- HAAT: 679 meters (2,228 ft)
- Transmitter coordinates: 33°9′33″N 116°36′53″W
- Repeater: 92.1-3 KARJ-HD3 (Escondido, California)

Links
- Public license information: Public file; LMS

KKLJ (100.1 FM, "Radio Nueva Vida") is a non-commercial educational radio station that is licensed to Julian, California and broadcasts to the San Diego area. The station is owned by Educational Media Foundation, but operated by The Association for Community Education, and airs the Spanish Christian teaching and music format, Radio Nueva Vida. KKLJ is relayed onto the HD3 subchannel of KARJ (92.1 FM).

== History ==
The station first signed on October 23, 1991 as KBNN; it was owned by Nuevo Communications Inc. and broadcast a soft adult contemporary music format with frequent local news reports. In May 1995, Nuevo Communications sold KBNN to Cruce Dun Spero Fido for $450,000. On November 1, 1995, KBNN changed its call letters to KLVW.

On January 30, 1997, Educational Media Foundation (EMF) purchased KLVW for $34,168; the organization soon flipped the station to contemporary Christian music from its nationally syndicated K-Love network. The call sign was changed to KLVJ on May 19, 1997.

On September 28, 2015, EMF announced it had purchased KPRI, an adult album alternative station licensed to Encinitas, California on 102.1 FM, from Compass Radio. KPRI began airing K-Love that afternoon. On October 27, 2015, KPRI and KLVJ swapped call signs, with the 100.1 FM frequency becoming KPRI. On December 14, 2017, KPRI changed its call letters to KKLJ. In October 2018, the station flipped to EMF's K-Love Classics network playing a mix of 1980s, 1990s, and 2000s Christian music.

In December 2018, KKLJ switched to Radio Nueva Vida, a Spanish-language Christian radio network. The station is now operated by Camarillo, California-based The Association for Community Education, but EMF retains ownership.
