= Radio Nueva Vida =

Spanish-language Christian radio network in the United States

Coordinates: 34.2230°N 119.0375°W

- Type: Radio network
- Country: United States

Programming
- Language: Spanish

Ownership
- Owner: Educational Media Foundation
- Parent: The Association for Community Education, Inc.
- Sister stations: K-LOVE; Air1

History
- Launch date: January 18, 1987 (39 years ago)

Coverage
- Availability: Nationwide through translators, HD Radio, iHeart radio, Tune-in and the official app for iPhone and Android

Links
- Webcast: Listen live
- Website: Radio Nueva Vida

Radio Nueva Vida (New Life) is a Spanish-language Christian radio network based in Camarillo, California, United States. It is owned and operated by the Educational Media Foundation through The Association for Community Education, Inc., a California non-profit 501(c)(3) organization established in 1981 and acquired by EMF in 2025.

== History ==
Radio Nueva Vida began broadcasting on January 18, 1987, after building radio station KMRO (90.3 FM) in Camarillo, California. In 1996, additional full-service stations were added to the network to serve Bakersfield and Kern County (KGZO, 90.9 FM), and Fresno and surrounding counties (KEYQ, 980 AM). In December 10, 2012 (KDRH, 91.3 FM) in King City. It added additional FM repeater stations, which cover the California communities of Salinas, San Bernardino, Santa Ana, Victorville, Indio, Palm Springs, Soledad, Los Banos, the San Fernando Valley, Colton, Coachella, Desert Center, Lancaster, Santa Barbara, King City, Santa Maria, Rosamond, Calexico, Palmdale and Modesto.

In 2000 and 2001, Radio Nueva Vida underwent a major expansion, leasing three full-power AM stations. They were KLTX (1390 AM) in Long Beach/Los Angeles, KEZY (1240 AM) in Riverside/San Bernardino, and KSDO (1130 AM) in San Diego, all property of Hi-Favor Broadcasting, LLC. On January 1, 2019, Radio Nueva Vida ended the lease with Hi-Favor Broadcasting, and ceased to broadcast on those stations.

In 2010, Radio Nueva Vida began a relationship with the Educational Media Foundation (EMF), the non-profit which operates the English-language Christian radio networks K-Love and Air1; after the discontinuation of the God's Country Radio Network in November 2010, EMF began to carry Radio Nueva Vida on some of its stations, either on the main signal or as an HD Radio subchannel.

In December 2024, EMF reached an agreement to take over the Association for Community Education as its sole member, continuing its activities as a subsidiary. The transaction involved no financial consideration and was described by both parties as a step to strengthen their existing partnership. EMF stated that the move would support its efforts to expand programming targeting Hispanic and Latino Americans. The acquisition was completed on February 7, 2025. Shortly thereafter, Radio Nueva Vida began a rapid expansion, launching broadcasts in Los Angeles, California on 92.7 FM and 91.1 FM, and in New York on 94.3 FM.

== Programming and publication ==
Radio Nueva Vida's programming format consists of Christian music and Spanish-language teaching and talk. Many of its programs are produced in-house to serve the Hispanic and Latino community, with content designed to address its spiritual and everyday needs. The Sembrador Informativo is a monthly newsletter mailed to supporters and listeners.

== Means of support ==
Radio Nueva Vida, a non-profit organization, is listener supported in a manner similar to that of public radio stations. Its listener-supporters are called Sembradores (Seed Sowers). Sembradores are recruited twice a year in pledge drives by the station, though listeners may donate at any time. There is no minimum amount of money required to become a Sembrador; any amount is accepted and all donors are encouraged to contribute whatever they can.

== Outreaches ==
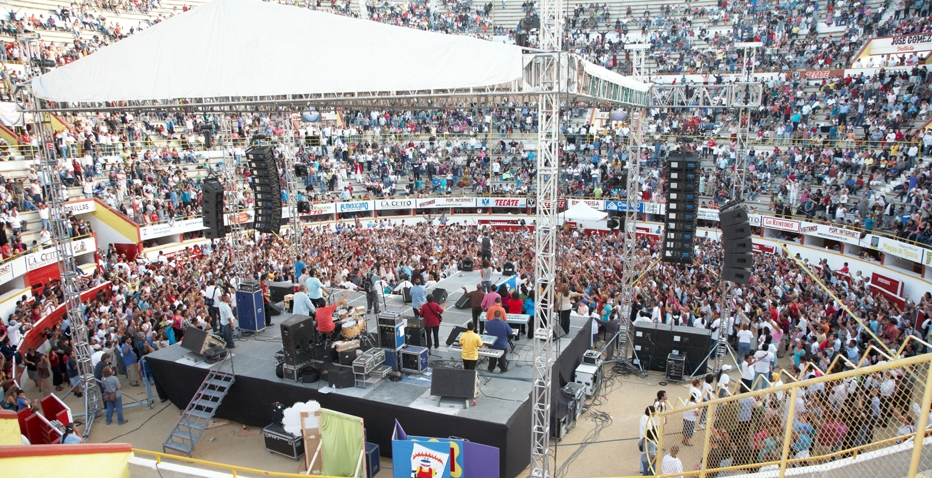
Radio Nueva Vida's Encounter in Tijuana, 2009

Radio Nueva Vida has produced a number of large gatherings entitled: Encounters with God at The Forum in Los Angeles, El Toreo of Tijuana, and in Bakersfield, Fresno, San Bernardino, San Diego, Boise, Idaho, and numerous other locations.

== Station list ==
Radio Nueva Vida can also be found on iHeart radio, Tune-in and the official app for iPhone and Android.

Below is a list of stations as provided by the Radio Nueva Vida website.

=== Full Power Stations ===
Call sign	Frequency	City of license	State
KAZK	89.7 FM	Catalina	Arizona
KGZO	90.9 FM	Bakersfield	California
KMRO (Note: Flagship station)	90.3 FM	Camarillo	California
KEYQ	980 AM	Fresno	California
KJNV	94.5 FM	Gilroy	California
KDRH	91.3 FM	King City	California
KKLJ	100.1 FM	Julian	California
KNVE	91.3 FM	Redding	California
KSDW	89.9 FM	Temecula	California
WRNV	91.1 FM	Norco	Louisiana
KGCN	91.7 FM	Roswell	New Mexico
WQRP	89.5 FM	Dayton	Ohio
KGCL	90.9 FM	Jordan Valley	Oregon
KPOR	90.3 FM	Welches	Oregon
KWOH-LPFM	104.3 FM	Biola	California
KLMD-HD3	101.1-3 FM (Note: HD Radio subchannel)	Talent	Oregon
KEZF	91.1 FM	Grants	New Mexico
KYLA	92.7 FM	Fountain Valley	California
KVKL	91.9 FM	Las Vegas	Nevada

=== Translators ===
Call sign	Frequency (MHz)	City of license	State
K204GE	88.7 FM	Fairbanks	Alaska
K235BX	94.9 FM	Calexico	California
K217EZ	91.3 FM	Coachella	California
K217EF	91.3 FM	Desert Center	California
K251AH	98.1 FM	Grand Terrace	California
K242BR	96.3 FM	Indio	California
K209FV	89.7 FM	Los Banos	California
K275CE	102.9 FM	Modesto	California
K295AI	106.9 FM	Muscoy	California
K253AD	98.5 FM	Oceanside	California
K242CR	96.3 FM	Palmdale	California
K210EW	89.9 FM	Rosamond	California
K217CQ	91.3 FM	Salinas	California
K211DK	90.1 FM	Santa Ana	California
K269EW	101.7 FM	Santa Maria	California
K240AK	95.9 FM	Soledad	California
K219DK	91.7 FM	Victorville	California
W268AY	101.5 FM	Seward Township	Illinois
K218DL	91.5 FM	Scottsbluff	Nebraska
K268GF	101.5 FM	Ashland	Oregon
K216DR	91.1 FM	Central Point	Oregon
K240CZ	95.9 FM	Tigard	Oregon
K205BM	88.9 FM	Oakland	California
K214DN	90.7 FM	Sun City	Arizona
K216EM	91.1 FM	Arcadia	California
K218EX	91.5 FM	Klamath Falls	Oregon
K220BV	91.9 FM	San Jose	California
K225CA	92.9 FM	Del Valle	Texas
K228FD	93.5 FM	Monterey	California
K236BQ	95.1 FM	Carmichael	California
K237EY	95.3 FM	Temple	Texas
K241CL	96.1 FM	Fresno	California
K255CL	98.9 FM	Clarksville	California
K265CV	100.9 FM	Fremont	California
KMRO-FM2	90.3 FM	Santa Barbara	California
KMRO-FM3	90.3 FM	Chatsworth	California
K240CZ	95.9 FM	Tigard	Oregon
W252DJ	98.3 FM	Jacksonville	Florida
K263BH	100.5 FM	New Auberry	California
K272GD	102.3 FM	Fresno	California

=== HD Stations ===
Station	City	State
90.7 FM-HD2	Hollister	California
100.3 FM-HD3	Los Angeles	California
90.5 FM-HD4	Modesto	California
105.1 FM-HD3	Palm Springs	California
88.5 FM-HD3	Temple	Texas
107.3 FM-HD3	San Francisco	California
97.7 FM-HD4	San Jose	California
88.9 HD3-FM	Santa Cruz	California
107.3 FM-HD3	Washington	DC
90.9 FM-HD3	Jacksonville	Florida
97.9 FM-HD4	Chicago	Illinois
89.1 FM-HD3	Cedar Rapids	Iowa
96.7 FM-HD3	New York City	New York
105.5 FM-HD3	Phoenix	Arizona
101.1 FM-HD3	Medford	Oregon
101.1 FM-HD3	Talent	Oregon
89.5 FM-HD3	Philadelphia	Pennsylvania
92.5 FM-HD2	Austin	Texas
89.5 FM-HD3	El Paso	Texas
103.7 FM-HD2	San Antonio	Texas
105.9 FM-HD3	Round Rock	Texas
102.1 FM-HD3	San Diego	California
97.9 FM-HD4	Portland	Oregon
88.3 FM-HD2	Reno	Nevada
