= XHA-FM =

Radio station in Tijuana, Baja California, Mexico

- Tijuana, Baja California; Mexico
- Broadcast area: Tijuana; Chula Vista, California, US
- Frequency: 94.5 MHz
- Branding: "La Invasora 94.5"

Programming
- Format: Regional Mexican

Ownership
- Owner: Uniradio; (Broadcasting Baja California, S.A. de C.V.)
- Sister stations: XHTY-FM

History
- First air date: July 20, 1979 (concession)
- Former call signs: XHTY-FM

Technical information
- Licensing authority: CRT
- Class: B1
- ERP: 20,000 watts
- HAAT: 103.8 meters (341 ft)

Links
- Webcast: Listen live
- Website: invasora945.com

XHA-FM (94.5 MHz, La Invasora 94.5), is a commercial radio station licensed in Tijuana, Baja California, Mexico. It is owned and operated by Uniradio and plays Regional Mexican music. The station carries similar programming to sister station 99.7 XHTY-FM.

== History ==
XHA was the original XHTY-FM, coming to air after receiving its concession on July 20, 1979. The station previously known as Radio Tambora with a Regional Mexican format and later changed to La Invasora.

In 1999, it became XHA-FM. The XHTY call sign moved to 99.7, which had previously been XHAMR-FM. The move accompanied a format swap between the stations: the Radio Amor romantic format moved from XHTY-FM 99.7 to 94.5 while La Invasora moved to 99.7. In 2005, the station relaunched as a Tijuana–oriented version of La Invasora, with XHTY using the same name but broadcasting to the San Diego area.
