= XEAZ-AM =

Radio station in Tijuana, Baja California

- Tijuana, Baja California; Mexico
- Frequency: 1270 kHz
- Branding: La Romantica

Programming
- Format: Romantic

Ownership
- Owner: Primer Sistema de Noticias; (Media Sports de México, S.A. de C.V.)

History
- First air date: 1948

Technical information
- Licensing authority: CRT
- Class: C
- Power: 500 watts

XEAZ-AM is a radio station in Tijuana, Baja California, Mexico, broadcasting on 1270 AM. It is known as La Romántica with a romantic music format.

== History ==
XEAZ received its concession on April 17, 1948. The station was originally owned by Fernando Sánchez Mayans. It may have signed on as early as December 20, 1947, as a border blaster where programs were recorded at studios in San Diego before being broadcast from the Tijuana transmitter. Its Tijuana studios were in a building that burned in a December 1951 fire, which claimed 41 lives.

In the 1980s, the station's Notitrece newscasts were the highest-rated in Tijuana. During the January 1993 Tijuana floods, the station opened its microphones to provide non-stop coverage and air demands for aid and food in the wake of the devastation caused. Employees pulled up to 18-hour shifts. The non-stop coverage from XEAZ, one of the city's smallest stations, led to praise from El Universal's Tijuana correspondent and an article in the San Diego Union-Tribune.

Radiodifusoras Capital acquired XEAZ in 2005 and sold the station to Grupo Radiodigital Siglo XXI, which soon merged with Grupo Radio México.

In 2015, XEAZ and 24 other radio stations were folded into Grupo Radio Centro, a business owned by the same family as GRM. GRC leased and then sold the station to PSN in 2021.

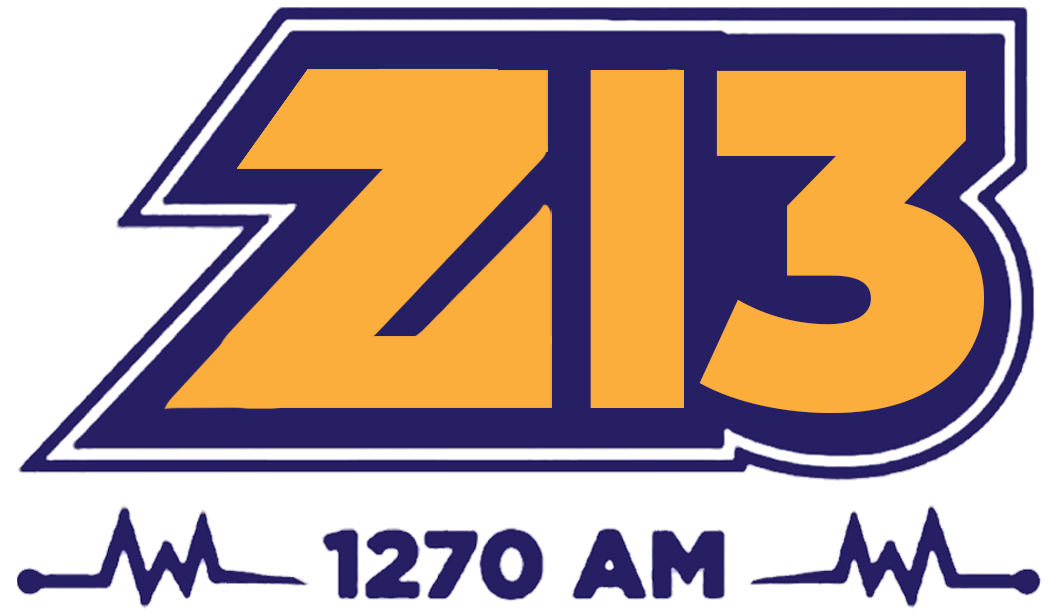
Previous logo
