= KSON =

KSON may refer to:

- KSON (FM) a radio station (103.7 FM) licensed to serve San Diego, California currently holding the call sign.
- KWFN, a radio station (97.3 FM) licensed to serve San Diego, California, which held the call sign KSON or KSON-FM from 1975 to 2017
- KGB-FM, a radio station (101.5 FM) licensed to serve San Diego, California, which held the call sign KSON-FM from 1950 to 1958
- KNSN (AM), a radio station (1240 AM) licensed to serve San Diego, California, which held the call sign KSON from 1947 to 1996 and from 1997 to 2009
- kson, YouTuber and VTuber formerly affiliated with VShojo
