= KMSX =

KMSX may refer to:

- KMSX-LD, a low-power television station (channel 33, virtual 51) licensed to serve Sacramento, California, United States; see List of television stations in California
- KHKN, a radio station (94.9 FM) licensed to serve Maumelle, Arkansas, United States, which held the call sign KMSX from 2003 to 2005
- KMYI, a radio station (94.1 FM) licensed to serve San Diego, California, which held the call sign KMSX in 2001
- KSSX, a radio station (95.7 FM) licensed to serve Carlsbad, California, which held the call sign KMSX from 1998 to 2001
