= KGTV Tower =

Californian television tower

Coordinates: 32°50′20″N 117°14′59″W

KGTV Tower is an 80.5-meter-high (264 ft) self-support Dresser-Ideco television tower in the La Jolla area of San Diego, California, United States.

== History ==
KGTV Tower (originally KFSD-TV tower, later KOGO-TV) was built in 1953, by then owner Thomas Sharp (founder of Sharp Healthcare). The main tower is also identical (although shorter) to former sister station KFSD/KOGO AM 600's twin 416 foot Dresser-Ideco towers.

== Radio Stations on KGTV Tower ==
The main tower is also home of the ERI combined FM antenna containing KMYI, KYXY, KSON and KIOZ.

Also at the site is a custom-built H-shaped tower used for microwave, and also serves as the main tower for KSSX.

- KMYI (formerly KFSD-FM/KOGO-FM) moved to the KGTV site in 1974 from the Emerald Hills KOGO 600 facility.
- KSSX moved to the KGTV site from the lower Soledad site of UCSD in 2007.
- KYXY moved to the KGTV site in 2007 from the KFMB Channel 8 tower site.
- KSON (originally KSDO-FM) was licensed to the site in the early 1960s.
- KIOZ moved to the KGTV site in 1999 from the KFMB Channel 8 tower site.

KGTV and the Mount Soledad transmitter site are presently owned by Scripps Broadcasting.

== See also ==
- List of masts
- KGTV
