= KHTS-FM =

Contemporary hit radio station in San Diego

- El Cajon, California; United States
- Broadcast area: Greater San Diego
- Frequency: 93.3 MHz (HD Radio)
- Branding: Channel 9-3-3

Programming
- Language: English
- Format: Contemporary hit radio
- Subchannels: HD2: "Pride Radio"; (LGBTQ community dance radio)
- Affiliations: Premiere Networks

Ownership
- Owner: iHeartMedia; (iHM Licenses, LLC)
- Sister stations: KGB; KGB-FM; KIOZ; KLSD; KMYI; KOGO; KSSX

History
- First air date: 1961
- Former call signs: KUFM (1961–1963); KECR (1963–1990); KECR-FM (1990–1995); KHTS (1995–2003)
- Call sign meaning: K-Hits (reference to station's top 40 format)

Technical information
- Licensing authority: FCC
- Facility ID: 20697
- Class: B
- ERP: 50,000 watts
- HAAT: 150 meters (490 ft)
- Transmitter coordinates: 32°43′48″N 117°05′6″W

Links
- Public license information: Public file; LMS
- Webcast: Listen live (via iHeartRadio)
- Website: channel933.iheart.com

KHTS-FM (93.3 MHz "Channel 9-3-3") is a Contemporary hit radio station licensed to El Cajon, California, serving the San Diego market. The station is owned by iHeartMedia, through licensee iHM Licenses, LLC. Its studios are located in San Diego's Serra Mesa area, while its transmitter is located in Chollas View, which is east of Balboa Park and west of Emerald Hills. KHTS-FM is available on HD Radio; its HD2 subchannel airs iHeart's Pride Radio network, a dance radio format for the LGBTQ community.

== History ==
=== Early beginnings, KECR (1961–1995) ===
The station signed on in 1961 as KUFM, later becoming KECR, then KECR-FM. For most of its existence prior to 1995, the station was owned by the religious Family Radio organization and aired its talk radio programming. Originally, the station maintained a localized board operator to air local news and weather, but when satellite technology became available, it became a repeater for KEAR in San Francisco. This religious format continued until 1995, when Jacor Communications purchased KECR-FM for $13.8 million. Family Radio now broadcasts in San Diego on KECR (910 AM). This acquisition marked Jacor's entry into San Diego. Shortly after the acquisition closed, the station acquired the KHTS callsign.

=== Channel 9-3-3 launches (1996–1998) ===
In March 1996, KHTS began stunting with a simulcast of Tampa, Florida-based WFLZ (coincidentally, also on 93.3 FM in that market) in an early form of voicetracking, allowing Jacor to plan for and hire for a new station without having to depend on a commercial-free "many-songs-in-a-row" gimmick during the transition period. This brought personalities such as Bubba The Love Sponge to the market, along with WFLZ referencing San Diego weather and events in their programming. This also allowed sufficient time to finish construction on the studios, which at the time, were located on Pacific Highway, about a mile from Pechanga Arena. The simulcast was broken on August 30, with the stunting shifting to a 43-hour loop of remixes of the then-popular song "Macarena" by Los Del Rio.

On September 1, at 10 a.m., the stunting shifted to a broadcast of that day's San Diego Chargers game in place of XETRA, which is required by law to carry Mexican presidential addresses under its Mexican radio license. At 4 p.m. that day, KHTS officially flipped to a dance-heavy rhythmic contemporary format, branded as "Channel 9-3-3". The station would also air attack liners against rivals XHITZ, KFMB-FM, and KKLQ; the latter two have since changed formats.

=== Nationwide/Jacor merger, Clear Channel acquisition (1998–2003) ===
By summer 1998, KHTS would move away from its dance-heavy approach to a more mainstream direction due to the Nationwide/Jacor merger. The merger would have brought KKLQ into the same ownership, but that station was spun off to Hispanic Broadcasting Corporation (now Univision Radio) to comply with the FCC ownership limits. During the first week of August in 1998, KHTS flipped to its present CHR format, inheriting the playlist from KKLQ (now KLNV). The station also launched Club 9-3-3, a dance mix show featuring dance remixes of contemporary hits. By 2000, outdoor advertising firm Clear Channel (through its radio and communications division) took ownership of the station. During this time, the station's transmitter was on Mount San Miguel, given El Cajon being its city of license. In 2001, the transmitter moved to its present site, sharing an antenna with sister station KLSD, to provide better coverage of the San Diego metropolitan area. The station's studios were also moved to their present location in Serra Mesa. Despite all these changes, the station remains licensed to El Cajon.

=== New technology (2003–2013) ===
On May 28, 2003, the station's callsign received the -FM suffix, becoming KHTS-FM. This was a legal change to avoid confusion of an AM talk radio station with the same call letters. The callsign meaning also became "Hits" to reference the Top 40 format. From 2001 until 2009, the station was the San Diego home for AJ Machado, at which time the morning show was called "AJ's Playhouse". In 2004, the station began RDS broadcasting in preparation for a commencement of HD Radio broadcasting in 2005, showing song titles and other text information on certified devices. The technology was also fitted to sister station KGB-FM, and has since been fitted to the other three FM sisters in the cluster.

In 2006, the station added notable personality Geena The Latina, who came in from KIIS-FM, to co-host the morning drive with AJ Machado.

During the Harris Fire in October 2007, KHTS-FM suspended all music programming to air news updates from AM sister station KOGO, which applied to all of its sister stations. In addition, the news updates included the Witch Fire. This began on October 21, while normal programming resumed on the 24th at 11 pm.

The station began to maintain a rhythmic-leaning direction (with occasional alternative music tracks) in 2013 while continuing to air dance mixes on weekends. This was mainly to compete with KEGY, but also due to XHITZ de-emphasizing hip-hop around this time.

=== iHeart ownership (2014–present) ===
On September 16, 2014, Clear Channel spun off its radio and communications divisions into a new company; KHTS-FM then became a part of iHeartMedia, its present owner. At the same time, the station began airing programming from iHeartRadio. The station also unveiled a new logo, using the green and purple from the previous logo, but now adding a green decimal point for its frequency. Despite this, the numbers are still pronounced individually.

In July 2017, the station became the San Diego affiliate for American Top 40, and in February 2018, the station began airing the weekly, network-wide iHeartRadio Countdown show, hosted by KIIS-FM personality JoJo Wright.

In early 2020, iHeartMedia announced major personality layoffs across their portfolio of stations. On January 20, 2020, it was confirmed on social media that KHTS-FM had been affected, as Kramer from the Kramer and Geena morning show was out as morning host. Two days later, it was announced that Frankie V would reunite with Geena after five years away at sister stations WJMN in Boston and KSSX in San Diego in the morning slot with "The Geena the Latina and Frankie Morning Show."

== HD Programming ==
KHTS-FM was amongst the first HD Radio stations in San Diego. Its HD2 subchannel carries Pride Radio — a dance radio network that targets the LGBTQ Community. Previously it carried a Latin CHR stream branded as Mega from 2005 until 2013.
