= KLSD =

Coordinates: 32°43′49.2″N 117°05′4.1″W

- San Diego, California; United States
- Broadcast area: San Diego–Tijuana
- Frequency: 1360 kHz
- Branding: The Patriot AM 1360

Programming
- Format: Conservative talk
- Network: 24/7 News
- Affiliations: Premiere Networks; Radio America; Westwood One

Ownership
- Owner: iHeartMedia, Inc.; (iHM Licenses, LLC)
- Sister stations: KGB, KGB-FM, KHTS-FM, KIOZ, KMYI, KOGO, KSSX

History
- First air date: July 14, 1922; 104 years ago (as KFBC)
- Former call signs: KFBC (1922–1928); KGB (1928–1982); KCNN (1982–1983); KPQP (1983–1986); KPOP (1986–2004)
- Former frequencies: 833.3 kHz (1922–1925); 1210 kHz (1925–1932); 1330 kHz (1932–1941)
- Call sign meaning: "Liberal San Diego" (refers to a previous progressive talk format)

Technical information
- Licensing authority: FCC
- Facility ID: 34452
- Class: B
- Power: 5,000 watts day; 1,000 watts night
- Translator: 103.3 K277DH (San Diego)

Links
- Public license information: Public file; LMS
- Webcast: Listen live (via iHeartRadio)
- Website: patriot1360.iheart.com

KLSD (1360 AM) is a radio station in the U.S. Licensed to San Diego, California, KLSD is owned by iHeartMedia and broadcasts a conservative talk format branded as "The Patriot."

Founded in 1922 with call sign KFBC, KLSD is San Diego's oldest licensed radio station. For much of its early history, it had the call sign KGB from 1928 to 1982. Art Linkletter was an announcer and later station manager for KGB radio in the 1930s. General Tire owned KGB from 1950 to 1956. During the KGB era, the station had different music formats, including top 40 from 1965 to 1972 and 1974 to 1982, and album-oriented rock from 1972 to 1974.

Beginning in the 1980s, KGB had several changes in identity and management. The station became KCNN in 1982 with a 24-hour simulcast of CNN, then a newly founded news cable channel. After one year, KCNN changed its call sign to KPQP in 1983 and its format to adult standards; this format would last nearly 20 years and include another call sign change to KPOP in 1986. In 1996, the station was purchased by Nationwide Communications, predecessor to iHeartMedia. Then in 2004, the station joined Air America Radio, a startup liberal talk radio network, and changed its call sign to KLSD. The liberal talk format stayed for three years. KLSD then had a sports format affiliated with Fox Sports Radio from 2007 to 2022. KLSD and a KGB station with a different frequency swapped formats in 2022, resulting in KLSD picking up its current conservative talk programming.

== History before KLSD ==
=== As KFBC (1922–1928) ===
Founded by W.K. Azbill in his home in the Normal Heights neighborhood of San Diego, it first signed on the air as KFBC on July 14, 1922, broadcasting on 833.3 kHz (360 meters) with 10 watts of power and sharing the time with eight other San Diego radio stations. To date, the station that is now KLSD remains the oldest, continuously licensed radio station in San Diego.

In September 1926, the Union League Club of San Diego County leased the station full-time from Azbill. Later that year, physician Arthur Wells Yale bought KFBC and all Union League properties, and the station moved to Balboa Theatre in downtown San Diego. As the government expanded the AM band to numerous frequencies, the station soon moved to 1210 kHz in 1927.

=== As KGB (1928–1982) ===
At the request of vice president George Bowles, the KFBC call sign was changed to KGB on March 27, 1928. Then on July 11 that year, the Pickwick Stages System, a transportation company in Los Angeles, bought the station. By December, KGB became an affiliate of Don Lee's radio network.

The Pickwick Stages System created the Pickwick Broadcasting System in January 1929 as the license holder for KGB and two other radio stations in California. KGB became a full-time CBS Radio Network affiliate as did all Don Lee stations. KGB began having a slogan "Music for the Sick", reflecting that its programming targeted people who had to stay home due to illness. Don Lee bought KGB outright on May 9, 1931. KGB also regularly broadcast Gus Arnheim concerts.

On August 5, 1932, the Federal Radio Commission authorized KGB to increase its power from 500 watts to 1,000 watts. At that time the station operated on 1330 kHz.

Future CBS and NBC broadcaster Art Linkletter began his broadcasting career in 1933 as an announcer for KGB. He was promoted to program director in 1934 and station manager in 1936. Linkletter also developed his "Man on the Street" audience participation shows while with KGB. Don Lee died in 1934, and his son Thomas S. Lee became president of the Don Lee company.

In 1936, KGB switched its network affiliation from CBS to the Mutual Broadcasting System. Around the same time, future television screenwriter Larry Rhine became a screenwriter and morning host for KGB. KGB also began a middle of the road music format.

On March 24, 1941, under the North American Regional Broadcasting Agreement, KGB was moved from 1330 to its present 1360 kHz. During World War II, KGB featured content relating to the U.S. military. The United States Navy broadcast ship signals on the station, and KGB hosted shows originating from the Marine Corps Recruit Depot and Naval Training Center San Diego. Those shows featured the United States Marine Corps with film stars such as Ginger Rogers and Henry Fonda as special guests. In this era, KGB was the most popular radio station in San Diego, with local car dealers being the top sponsors.

On December 27, 1950, the General Tire and Rubber Company bought KGB as part of a $12.3 million purchase including all Thomas S. Lee properties and interest in the Mutual Broadcasting System.

The broadcast license transferred to Marion R. Harris in 1954 and KGB Inc. in 1956. In April 1959, KGB moved from the Mutual Broadcasting System to ABC Radio Network.

On April 1, 1964, Willet Brown bought KGB. Then in 1965, KGB became the first client of the Drake-Chenault consulting company and changed to the Boss Radio Top 40 music format. Nearly two months into retaining Drake-Chenault, KGB had its ratings improve from worst to best in San Diego.

In 1972, KGB became an early adopter and pioneer of what is now called the album oriented rock format, simulcasting with co-owned KGB-FM. KGB-AM returned to Top 40 in 1974. In 1979, the station began designating itself as 13-K.

=== As KCNN, KPQP, and KPOP (1982–2004) ===
On March 15, 1982, KGB's call sign changed to KCNN, and the format changed to an audio simulcast of CNN. General manager Jim Price based the format change on anticipation of listeners preferring FM for music. However, KCNN struggled in the ratings, never rising above a 2.3 share.

KCNN changed its format to adult standards in July 1983, with its call sign changing to KPQP on October 7, 1983, then to KPOP on August 1, 1986.

Nearly four decades of local ownership ended in 1996, when Nationwide Communications bought KPOP. Nationwide was later acquired by Jacor in 1997. Then in 1998, Clear Channel Communications bought Jacor and its stations including KPOP.

Beginning in the 2000–01 season, KPOP became the radio home of San Diego State Aztecs men's basketball. In June 2001, former KFMB Hudson and Bauer co-host Joe Bauer became morning drive host of Breakfast with Bauer at KPOP. In 2002, KPOP added a rotating set of lifestyle programs at 6 p.m. weeknights.

== History as KLSD ==
=== Progressive talk (2004–2007) ===
The station became a progressive talk station under the call sign KLSD on August 23, 2004. The call sign reportedly stood for "Liberal San Diego".

Most of the programming came from the Air America Radio Network. KLSD also aired the Ed Schultz show from Jones Radio Network and Mike Malloy from Nova M Radio. Local programming included the morning show, hosted by Stacy Taylor and the nationally syndicated Air America host Jon Elliott.

In August 2005, Clear Channel applied to the FCC to increase KLSD's power to 50,000 watts day and night, planning to share the six-tower KSDO array in Santee, California, since the owners of KLSD also owned the broadcast site for KSDO. However, due to the added cost, Clear Channel decided against the move. KLSD still broadcasts at 5,000 watts during the day and 1,000 watts during the night.

=== As a sports station (2007–2022) ===
KLSD's first logo as a sports station, used from 2007-2014

After registering a 2.2 rating in the winter 2006–07 period, KLSD's ratings declined to 0.9 and 1.0 for the spring and summer 2007 ratings books, according to Arbitron. In an August 31, 2007, article, San Diego Union-Tribune sports reporter Jay Posner found that Clear Channel registered the domain name "xtrasports1360.com", sparking speculation that the company would change KLSD to a sports format. The blog SDRadio.net hinted at a format change nearly a week earlier August 23.

Following the SDRadio.net report, listeners organized and held rallies to attempt to persuade Clear Channel to keep the format. A documentary titled Save KLSD: Media Consolidation and Local Radio was made about the effort.

Posner reported for the Union-Tribune on October 13, 2007, that Clear Channel planned on changing KLSD to sports.

On November 12, 2007, KLSD flipped to the new format as XTRA Sports 1360, inheriting the former branding from XETRA-AM, which would change its callsign to XEWW a month later. The first local live program, which aired at 3 p.m. that day, was hosted by Lee Hacksaw Hamilton. Outside of local programming, the new XTRA Sports broadcast the national Fox Sports Radio network.

In 2008, KLSD broadcast select San Diego State Aztecs baseball. Hacksaw left the station in 2008 when his contract was not renewed.

KLSD was not listed in the Arbitron ratings book in the winter 2007–08 period. KLSD returned to the Arbitron ratings books in June 2009 with an 0.6 share. The ratings would remain around that level in the final months of 2009.

KLSD's second logo as a sports station, used from 2014-2021

Beginning in the 2009–10 season, KLSD became the San Diego affiliate for the Los Angeles Lakers.

On July 21, 2014, KLSD rebranded as "Xtra 1360 Fox Sports San Diego" as a partnership with the Fox Sports San Diego TV network.

In September 2014, Clear Channel Communications became iHeartMedia.

KLSD's last logo as sports station, used from 2021-2022

On May 8, 2017, KLSD and sister station KGB-FM signed a contract with San Diego State University to broadcast San Diego State Aztecs football and men's basketball after the previous contract with XEPRS-AM "The Mighty 1090" expired.

Beginning in the fall of 2020, KLSD began broadcasting some ESPN Radio programming during the week, with ESPN Radio's East Coast morning drive show Keyshawn, JWill, and Zubin weekdays at 3 a.m. and weekend mornings to noon.

=== Conservative talk (2022–present) ===
On August 31, 2022, iHeartMedia announced that it would swap the formats of 760 KGB and KLSD at midnight the next day, with KGB's nationally syndicated conservative talk shows moving to the 1360 AM signal and KLSD's sports programming moving to KGB on 760 AM. The swap, timed to coincide with the beginning of the college football season, moved San Diego State football and the other sports programming to a stronger signal.

KLSD was rebranded "1360 the Patriot" beginning September 1 with an all-syndicated lineup including The Glenn Beck Program and The Mark Levin Show. Mark Larson and Mike Slater, hosts previously on KGB, moved to KOGO.

== Programming ==
KLSD's schedule is primarily nationally syndicated shows such as Premiere Networks' The Glenn Beck Radio Program and The Jesse Kelly Show, and Westwood One's The Mark Levin Show.

== Technical information ==
The station operates with 5,000 watts by day and 1,000 watts at night using a non-directional antenna. It shares a broadcasting tower with co-owned KGB-FM and KHTS-FM on 52nd Street in the Oak Park neighborhood of San Diego. Programming is also heard on FM translator K277DH at 103.3 MHz. The radio studios and offices are located at the Serra Mesa section of northeastern San Diego.
