= Billy Ray Smith Jr. =

American football player (1961–2026)

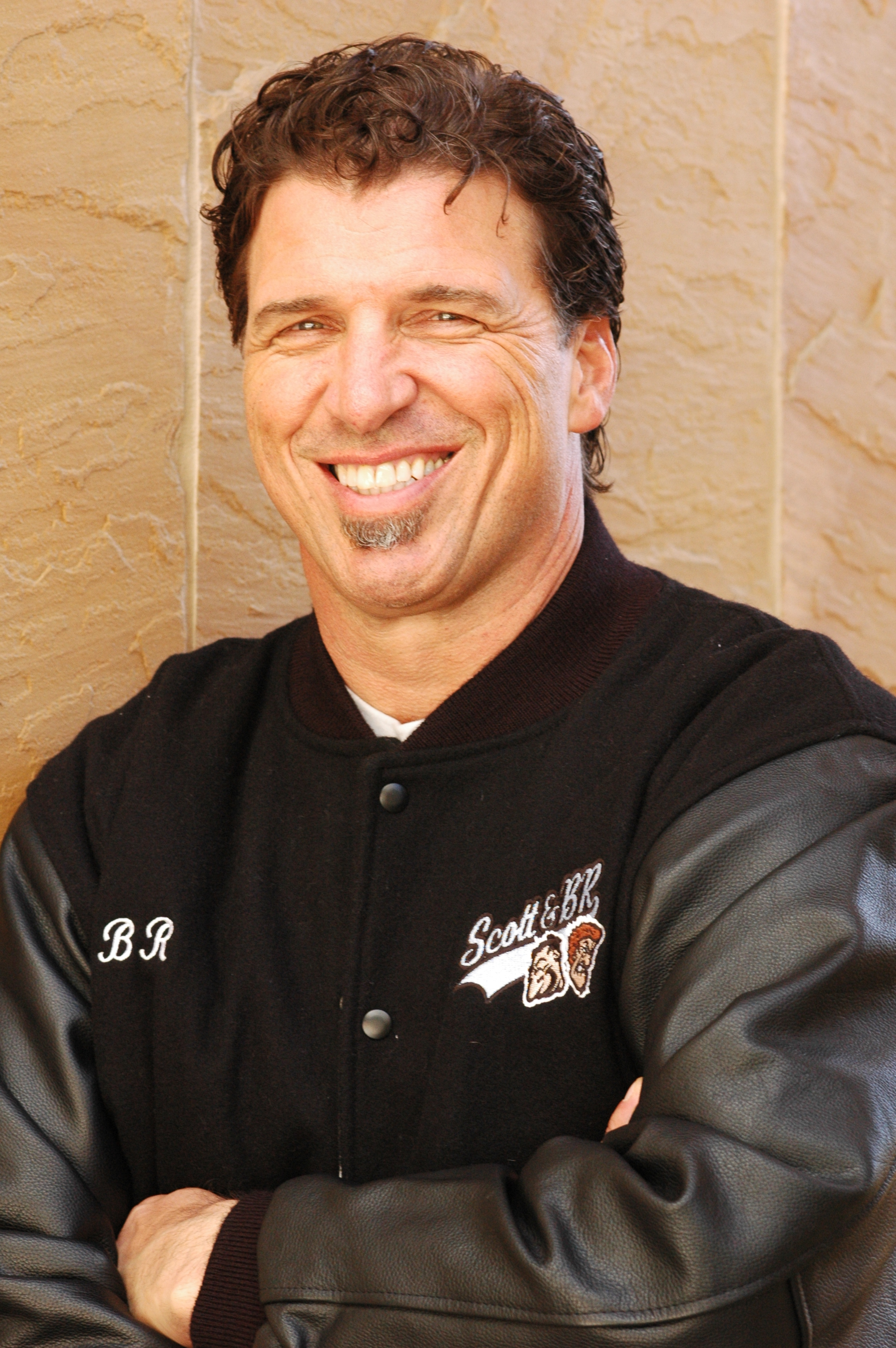
- Smith in 2005

No. 54
- Position: Linebacker

Personal information
- Born: August 10, 1961; Fayetteville, Arkansas, U.S.
- Died: July 29, 2026 (aged 64)
- Listed height: 6 ft 3 in (1.91 m)
- Listed weight: 231 lb (105 kg)

Career information
- High school: Plano (Plano, Texas)
- College: Arkansas (1979–1982)
- NFL draft: 1983: 1st round, 5th overall pick

Career history
- San Diego Chargers (1983–1992)

Awards and highlights
- Second-team All-Pro (1989); San Diego Chargers 50th Anniversary Team; Knute Rockne Memorial Trophy (1982); 2× Unanimous All-American (1981, 1982); First-team All-SWC (1982)

Career NFL statistics
- Sacks: 26.5
- Interceptions: 15
- Fumble recoveries: 14
- Stats at Pro Football Reference
- College Football Hall of Fame

Billy Ray Smith Jr. (August 10, 1961 – July 29, 2026) was an American professional football player who was a linebacker for 10 seasons with the San Diego Chargers of the National Football League (NFL) from 1983 to 1992. He played college football for the Arkansas Razorbacks and was inducted into the College Football Hall of Fame.

A two-time unanimous All-American selection with Arkansas, Smith was selected by the Chargers with the fifth overall pick of the 1983 NFL draft. He was named to the Chargers 50th Anniversary Team. After his football career, he became a broadcaster in San Diego and also worked for Fox Sports Net.

== Early life ==
Smith was born in Fayetteville, Arkansas, on August 10, 1961. His father, Billy Ray Smith Sr., also played collegiately for Arkansas before 13 seasons as a defensive lineman in the NFL. Smith Jr. grew up in Plano, Texas, where he attended Plano Senior High School. In 1977, he helped them win the Texas Class 4A state championship in front of a state high school record crowd of 49,953 at Texas Stadium. He was inducted into the Texas High School Football Hall of Fame in 1989.

== College career ==
At the University of Arkansas, Smith began his career under head coach Lou Holtz as a defensive tackle. He became a standup defensive end in his last two seasons, earning unanimous All-American selections in 1981 and 1982. He was a captain of their 1982 team that went 9–2–1 and defeated Florida in the Bluebonnet Bowl. He finished his career with 299 total tackles and set a school career record for tackles for loss with 63.

Smith was a member of the Arkansas All-Decade Team and Arkansas All-Century Team. He was also inducted into both the Arkansas Sports Hall of Fame and Razorback Hall of Honor. Smith was inducted into the College Football Hall of Fame in 2000.

== Professional career ==
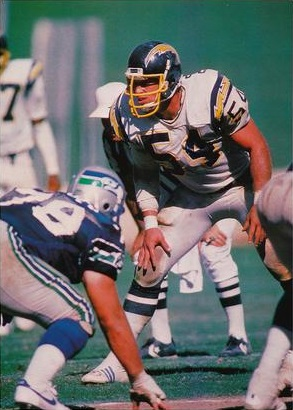
Smith c. 1985

Smith was selected by the San Diego Chargers in the first round of the 1983 NFL draft. He was the fifth overall pick and the first defensive player taken. Led by their vaunted Air Coryell offense, the Chargers had reached the playoffs in 1982, but were looking to revamp one of the league's worst defenses and reach the Super Bowl. However, the team slid as the defense continued to struggle and the offense entered its twilight.

Smith began his career with the Chargers as an inside linebacker. The team struggled with records of 6–10 in 1983 and 7–9 in 1984. They finished 8–8 in 1985, when Smith was named the team's defensive player of the year. San Diego scored 30+ points nine times that year, but they ranked 28th and last in the league in overall defense, and defensive coordinator Tom Bass was fired mid-season. The following year, new defensive coordinator Ron Lynn moved Smith to outside linebacker. "I never really felt suited for [playing inside]," Smith said. "Inside linebackers like to play smash-mouth. They lose brain cells faster than any other profession in the United States."

In 1986, Smith was voted second-team All-AFC by United Press International after recording a career-high 11 sacks and again earning Chargers defensive player of the year honors. He was All-AFC once more in 1987, when he had a career-best five interceptions in 12 games and was named the team's most valuable player. By Lynn's fourth season with the Chargers in 1989, the defense improved to sixth overall in the league, and Smith was named second-team All-Pro by Newspaper Enterprise Association.

In his first five seasons, Smith missed just one game and started in 74 of his 75 contests. However, injuries impacted his availability and play in four of his final five seasons. In his last season in 1992, he partially tore a tendon above his hamstring in the season opener, and missed the remainder of the season. San Diego finished above .500 for just the second time in Smith's career and reached the playoffs for the first time since he joined Chargers. He played his entire 10-year NFL career with the Chargers, finishing with 26.5 sacks, 15 interceptions and 13 forced fumbles in 126 games. He was voted by fans and Chargers Hall of Famers to the Chargers 50th Anniversary Team in 2009.

Smith was never voted into a Pro Bowl, though he was named a second alternate in both 1987 and 1989, as well as a fourth alternate in 1986. "Unfortunately, because of some of the things we've asked [Smith] to do, he doesn't have some of the statistics that these other guys have to get to the Pro Bowl", said Lynn. He did not rush the quarterback enough to accumulate higher sack totals nor drop into pass coverage more and compile added interceptions.

== Broadcasting career ==
During his football career, Smith worked in the offseason for several years at San Diego's local ABC affiliate, KGTV, where his wife, Kimberly Hunt, is a news anchor. After retiring from playing, he remained in San Diego and joined the station as a sports field reporter before becoming their sportscaster. He served as their sports director for two years (1996–1997).

Smith was the co-host of the San Diego afternoon drive-time sports program The Scott and B.R. Show with Scott Kaplan. Kaplan was fired in February 2012 for comments he made about a female broadcaster, prompting Smith to quit in sympathy of Kaplan, and the show was cancelled. Smith then co-hosted a TV morning show by The San Diego Union-Tribune with Kaplan and Amber Mesker. He left the show in December 2012, after which he and co-host Kaplan were re-hired at XX Sports Radio.

Smith also worked on Fox Sports Net's college football shows and was the co-host of Chargers Power Report, the team's weekly TV show. He was also an analyst for Fox Sports Net on their NFL shows, and performed the same role for the Chargers' preseason telecasts. He teamed with play-by-play man Chris Roberts as a color analyst on UCLA football radio broadcasts for four seasons (1997–2000).

== Personal life and death ==
Smith was first married to Nina Dickinson on August 27, 1983 in Houston, Texas. They divorced in 1985.

Smith and Hunt married in 1990. They had one daughter. In 2009, Smith was reported to be one of over 100 former athletes who pledged to donate their brains after their death to the Boston University CTE Center and Brain Bank to study chronic traumatic encephalopathy (CTE).

Smith died on July 29, 2026, at age 64. That day, his family said that he had had a "long journey with dementia caused by CTE". However, CTE can only be definitively diagnosed posthumously and not during life. Smith's brain was donated to Boston University for analysis.
