= KFMB =

KFMB may refer to:

- KFMB-TV, a television station (channel 8) licensed to San Diego, California, United States
- KGB (AM), a radio station (760 AM) licensed to San Diego, California, United States, which held the call sign KFMB from 1941 to 2020
- KFBG (FM), a radio station (100.7 FM) licensed to San Diego, California, United States, which held the call sign KFMB-FM from 1959 to 2020
