= KOGO (AM) =

News/talk radio station in San Diego

- San Diego, California; United States
- Broadcast area: Southern California
- Frequency: 600 kHz
- Branding: Newsradio 600 KOGO

Programming
- Format: News/Talk
- Affiliations: Compass Media Networks; Fox News Radio; Premiere Networks; Los Angeles Chargers Radio Network

Ownership
- Owner: iHeartMedia, Inc.; (iHM Licenses, LLC)
- Sister stations: KGB, KGB-FM, KHTS-FM, KIOZ, KLSD, KMYI, KSSX

History
- First air date: June 30, 1925
- Former call signs: KFWV (1925–1926); KFSD (1926–1961); KOGO (1961–1983); KLZZ (1983–1987); KKLQ (1987–1994)
- Former frequencies: 1220 kHz (1925–1926); 620 kHz (1926)
- Call sign meaning: Chosen by an IBM computer; pronounced phonetically as "Ko-Go"

Technical information
- Licensing authority: FCC
- Facility ID: 51514
- Class: B
- Power: 9,000 watts (day); 10,000 watts (night)
- Transmitter coordinates: 32°50′33.2″N 117°01′33.1″W
- Repeater: 94.1 KMYI-HD2 (San Diego)

Links
- Public license information: Public file; LMS
- Webcast: Listen live (via iHeartRadio)
- Website: kogo.iheart.com

KOGO (600 kHz) is a commercial radio station in San Diego, California. The station airs a news/talk radio format and is owned by iHeartMedia, Inc. Its studios and offices are located in San Diego's Kearny Mesa neighborhood on the northeast side.

KOGO transmits with 9,000 watts during the day and 10,000 watts at night. The station moved from a directional antenna with a two-tower array transmitter located off 60th Street at Old Memory Lane in the Emerald Hills neighborhood of San Diego. It now co-shares with KGB at a three tower array in Santee (on the wonderfully named Megahertz Place) . The third tower is across State Highway 52 from the other 2. The signal pattern generally follows the Pacific Coast from Baja California, Mexico, to Santa Barbara. Because of its reach, KOGO is one of the primary Emergency Alert System (EAS) stations for the San Diego radio market.

== History ==
=== KFWV and KFSD ===
The station was originally licensed on June 30, 1925, broadcasting at 1320 kHz with 250 watts of power from the U.S. Grant Hotel. The original call sign was KFWV. In 1926, the call letters changed to KFSD and the station moved down the dial to 620 AM. KFSD was the first commercially licensed station in the city (KFSD stands for "First in San Diego"); at the time, KFBC/KGB was an amateur station that was not full-time. In 1928, KFSD was facing bankruptcy, so it was sold to Thomas Sharp (who founded Sharp HealthCare in San Diego). (A station in Escondido, not related to this station, now uses the KFSD callsign.)

In 1931, KFSD became an affiliate of the NBC Red Network. It carried NBC's dramas, comedies, news, sports, soap operas, game shows and big band broadcasts during the "Golden Age of Radio". KFSD was owned by the Airfan Radio Corporation. In the 1930s, the station also moved to its current frequency of 600 kHz.

In 1948, KFSD moved its studios to a former country club in Emerald Hills, east of downtown San Diego. The facility housed KFSD's studios, transmitter, and offices. That same year, San Diego's first FM station, KFSD-FM (now KMYI), signed on from Emerald Hills. In 1953, KFSD-TV (now KGTV) became the third TV station to sign on in San Diego.

=== KOGO ===
In 1961, KFSD was changing formats, so management also decided to change the call letters. The owners at the time fed facts about San Diego and its people into a new device called a computer, which was then asked to give them the perfect call sign for the station. The IBM computer gave them the call letters KOGO. Thus, in 1961 the San Diego station known as KOGO (pronounced "Ko-Go") was born.

In 1972, Time Life Broadcasting (owners of KOGO-AM-FM-TV since 1961) decided to sell its San Diego broadcast properties. Due to FCC regulations at the time the stations had to be split off. KOGO was sold to Retlaw Enterprises, owned by the family of Walt Disney. Channel 10 was sold to McGraw Hill Publishing and the call letters were changed to KGTV (which stands for KOGO-TV). The station at 94.1 FM got back the call sign KFSD but was sold many times over. It was primarily a classical music station. The FM outlet changed its call letters to KFSD, then KXGL (for the Eagle), then to KJQY (for "K-Joy"), and finally in 2001 to KMYI. The AM station changed its branding to KOGO Radio 60, then to KOGO Radio 6, then to KOGO Radio 6, the radio magazine. It had a mixed format of middle of the road (MOR) music, talk and sports.

=== KLZZ and KKLQ ===
The Shadacks (Ed and his nephew Tom) took over KOGO and KPRI (106.5 FM), but both stations had poor ratings in the early 1980s. In 1983 both stations changed to KLZZ-AM-FM (using the name "Class FM/AM") with a soft AC format. But Class struggled in the ratings.

Edens Broadcasting bought the stations and turned them into Top 40/CHR KKLQ-AM-FM, using the moniker "Q106". Most music listening for young people had switched to FM by this point, but the AM 600 signal was able to serve the remaining listeners who only had AM radios in their cars, or lived in Northern San Diego County where the FM's signal is spotty. The station sometimes would mention that AM 600 could be heard in Los Angeles and Orange County.

=== Return to KOGO ===
In the early 1990s, Par Broadcasting purchased the stations and ended the simulcast, flipping the AM station to a talk format on April 25, 1994. Par bought back the call letters KOGO for 600 AM. The KOGO call sign, during the hiatus, was used in Ventura, California on the 1590 AM frequency (now KVTA). At that time, 1590 was owned by Jack Woods (formerly Charlie of Charlie and Harrigan on KFMB and KCBQ).

In 1997, Par Broadcasting sold its San Diego stations to Jacor/Citicasters, which in turn merged with Clear Channel Communications. KOGO was reunited with its original FM sister in 1998 when Jacor/Citicasters purchased the radio properties of Nationwide Communications, including 94.1 FM. Clear Channel became iHeartMedia in 2014.

On October 14, 2014, KOGO added three news blocks to its program schedule. Over time, the news block in morning drive time has remained but the midday and afternoon news blocks have been switched to talk programming. In May 2009, KOGO's newscasts outside of morning and early evening were being produced by Los Angeles sister station 640 KFI. It was also disclosed that some newscasts in the evening were prerecorded.

=== California wildfires ===
During the October 2007 California wildfires, news, information, and talk from KOGO was simulcast on every San Diego-area station owned by Clear Channel. This continued from the night of October 21 to the evening of October 24. KOGO dropped all commercial breaks during this period.

KOGO was also simulcast on Channel 24/7 of XM Satellite Radio, which the service used for emergency information. Regular programming on KOGO returned on the night of October 24 at 11 p.m. with the syndicated Coast to Coast AM.

=== 95.7 simulcast ===
KOGO programming began simulcasting on 95.7 KUSS on November 7, 2011. Management saw fewer young and middle-aged listeners switching to AM so the plan was KOGO would gain younger listeners by being on the FM dial.

The simulcast ended on November 16, 2012, at 7 pm, when KOGO-FM began stunting with Christmas music. After Christmas it switched to rhythmic adult contemporary music as KSSX. The combined ratings of AM 600 and FM 95.7 did not make the simulcast as profitable as keeping the AM as a news/talk outlet and switching the FM to a music format.

Former logo

== Programming ==
As of November 2024, Weekdays begin with "San Diego's Morning News" with Ted Garcia and Veronica Carter. In middays, KOGO airs nationally syndicated shows from co-owned Premiere Networks: The Clay Travis and Buck Sexton Show and The Sean Hannity Show. Late afternoon and evening drive time features local shows from Mike Slater, Lou Penrose, Leland Conway and Mark Larson. In late nights and early mornings, KOGO carries Coast to Coast AM with George Noory and This Morning, America's First News with Gordon Deal.

Weekends feature shows on money, health, faith and technology. Weekend programs include The Kim Komando Show, Sunday Night with Bill Cunningham, Rich DeMuro on Tech, Armstrong & Getty, Somewhere in Time with Art Bell and The Jesus Christ Show with Neil Saavedra. Most hours begin with an update from Fox News Radio.

== Sports ==
Until the 2012–2013 academic year, KOGO was the official broadcast home for the San Diego State Aztecs football and men's basketball programs. However, some basketball games were transferred to co-owned 1360 KLSD if the football team was also playing at the same time, or if it was a weekday early-evening game on the West Coast. With the 2013–2014 season, Aztec football and basketball games began airing on XEPRS-AM (The Mighty 1090).

KOGO carried San Diego Padres baseball games from the team's debut in the National League in 1969 through 1978. Padres games again were heard on KOGO in the early 2000s, before losing the rights to 1090 XEPRS in 2003.

KOGO was also the radio home of the San Diego Chargers football team in the early 1980s. Ted Leitner did play-by-play with Pat Curran in the booth. Pre- and post-game show duties were handled by Randy Hahn and Jim Laslavic. The games were eventually simulcast on KLZZ (106.5 FM). In 1985, XETRA 690 AM took the broadcast rights. Leitner was replaced by Lee Hamilton, who had come in from Phoenix.

KOGO was the co-flagship station of the San Diego Fleet in the now-defunct Alliance of American Football, alongside co-owned 1360 KLSD. The AAF did not complete its inaugural 2019 season.
