= Kim Hunt =

Kimberly Hunt is an American broadcast journalist.

Kimberly Hunt or Kim Hunt may also refer to:

- Kim Hunt, Canadian drummer, member of Zon (band) as well as Urgent and Moxy

== See also ==
- Hunt (disambiguation)
