= Monique Marvez =

Hispanic American comedian

- Born: September 23, 1962 (age 63); Miami, Florida
- Website: moniquemarvez.com

Monique Marvez is a Hispanic American comedian, film producer and actress based in Los Angeles, California. She is known chiefly for her comedy albums including Built for Comfort, The Reality Chick and Laughs From Abroad, her video specials including Not Skinny Not Blonde and Live in Hermosa Beach, her participation in ensemble comedy specials such as Snoop Dogg's Bad Girls of Comedy and Latin Divas of Comedy, and for her work in films (including Reggie: A Millennial Depression Comedy, Living Fuller and Kismet) and radio.

Marvez began her comedy career at age 27 and is known for a performing style that is frank and sexually explicit, as well as "conversationally funny and motivational." She also draws upon her Hispanic family and upbringing for ethnically based humor.

== Early life and career ==
Marvez was born in Miami, Florida in 1962 to a half-Cuban, half-Puerto Rican mother and a Venezuelan father. Her father was married five times and her mother four, including twice to each other. She began her career performing live stand-up comedy at cabarets and clubs in Miami's South Beach neighborhood. Marvez has said she became a comic as "a defense mechanism for me. I'm part of the dinged-up, jacked-up people....my dad was manic-depressive, and I think kids inherently try to provide what's missing to the household … so I became a comedian because it was the fastest route. It worked faster than any pill when my dad was in a bad way. It was very powerful. As a little kid, it was intoxicating to have that kinda power over an adult."

She was told early on "that I would never be booked because people don't want to hear crazy stuff out of a pretty face," Marvez said. "Back when I started some 25 years ago, there were no attractive women in comedy and telling it like it is. It was the unprettiest thing." She has since performed in comedy specials on Showtime, HBO and Amazon Prime, as well as Comedy Central, ABC, CBS, PBS and her own channel on YouTube. She has also written material for Disney, NBCUniversal and Dick Wolf Productions.

During the 2000s Marvez worked in radio, first at San Diego's KFMB-AM and then at KFBG, then known as "100.7 Jack FM." She says, "I was literally plucked off the stand-up stage. I'd never done any type of radio." She left radio in 2010, saying that "Radio kind of dulled me a little bit. I was a lot more sharp-witted when I was on the road. So my contract ended in March, and as much as I love the steady gig, and as much as I love the money that comes with the steady gig, it gets to being too much like a job … and I didn’t become a comedian to have a job. Being a comedian is a calling, not a job."

== Personal life ==
Marvez is currently single and lives in Los Angeles.
