= KBZT =

Alternative rock radio station in San Diego

- San Diego, California; United States
- Broadcast area: San Diego metropolitan area
- Frequency: 94.9 MHz (HD Radio)
- Branding: Alt 94-9

Programming
- Language: English
- Format: Alternative rock
- Subchannels: HD3: Comedy

Ownership
- Owner: Audacy, Inc.; (Audacy License, LLC)
- Sister stations: KSON; KWFN; KXSN; KYXY

History
- First air date: March 6, 1960
- Former call signs: KLRO (1960–1978); KBZT (1978–1987); KWLT (1987–1989); KKYY (1989–1991); KRMX (1991–1992); KBZS (1992–1994)
- Call sign meaning: Sounds like "K-Best" (former branding)

Technical information
- Licensing authority: FCC
- Facility ID: 58816
- Class: B
- ERP: 26,500 watts
- HAAT: 209 meters (686 ft)
- Transmitter coordinates: 32.838°N 117.250°W

Links
- Public license information: Public file; LMS
- Webcast: Listen live (via Audacy); Listen live (via Audacy) (HD3)
- Website: www.audacy.com/alt949

KBZT (94.9 FM, "Alt 94-9") is a commercial radio station licensed to San Diego, California. Owned by Audacy, Inc., the station broadcasts an alternative rock format. Its studios are located in San Diego's Stonecrest area, and the transmitter is located in La Jolla.

KBZT broadcasts in HD Radio; it carries two additional formats on digital subchannels. Its HD2 subchannel formerly carried the reggae-formatted Bob Radio. The HD2 subchannel has since been turned off. The HD3 subchannel carries an all-comedy channel.

== History ==
=== MOR (1960–1978) ===
94.9 FM began as KLRO-FM in 1960 with a middle-of-the-road format.

=== Adult Contemporary/Oldies (1978–1987) ===
On September 14, 1978, KLRO-FM flipped to gold-based adult contemporary, changed call letters to KBZT and changed monikers to "K-Best 95." In the mid-1980s, the station flipped to oldies.

=== Soft Rock (1987–1992) ===
In 1987, after the station was sold to Sandusky Radio, the station adopted new call letters KWLT, flipped to soft rock, and changed monikers to "K-Lite 95", before changing again to "Y95" and the KKYY calls in 1989. As KWLT, the station launched the local careers of morning show hosts, Jeff Elliot and Jerry St. James, better known as Jeff and Jer (most recently on KYXY).

In 1991, Jeff and Jer moved to rival B100, with KKYY changing its name to "Mix 94.9", adopted new call letters KRMX, and added more gold based music.

=== Oldies (1992–2000) ===
The station reverted to back to oldies, again as "K-Best 95" on January 16, 1992, though with the call letters KBZS. (The KBZT call letters and "K-Best" logo were featured on a station in Palm Springs, where it was briefly the number one station in that market. The call letters returned to San Diego in 1994 after the Palm Springs station became KUNA-FM.)

In the mid-1990s, Sandusky sold the station to Anaheim Broadcasting, which in turn sold 94.9 to Jefferson-Pilot, making KBZT a sister station to country-formatted KSON-FM.

=== 80s Hits (2000–2002) ===
On November 10, 2000, due to low ratings, KBZT switched to an "'80s Hits" format, just a day before KMSX dropped hot AC and adopted the same format.

=== Alternative (2002–present) ===
On November 11, 2002, KBZT flipped to alternative rock, branded as "FM 94/9". In 2006, Lincoln Financial Media bought KBZT and all the others that were owned by J-P, including KIFM and KSON. In April 2006, the Lincoln Financial Group completed a merger between themselves and the Jefferson-Pilot Corporation. The media assets of the new merged company (including several San Diego area radio stations) are now called Lincoln Financial Media. On December 8, 2014, Entercom announced it was purchasing Lincoln Financial Group's entire 15-station lineup (including KBZT) in a $106.5 million deal, and would operate the outlets under an LMA deal until the sale was approved by the FCC. The sale to Entercom was consummated on July 17, 2015.

On February 1, 2018, KBZT rebranded as "Alt 94-9", aligning itself with Entercom's similarly branded stations across the country. The rebranding also solidified its continued operation as a music station; Entercom's hiring of former XEPRS jock Dan Sileo led to speculation that either KBZT or KEGY would be flipped to a sports talk format to accompany Sileo, as well as Entercom's rights to the San Diego Padres (a deal which began on KBZT for the 2017 season). The team announced later that month that Padres broadcasts would move to KEGY, which flipped from Top 40/CHR to the hot talk-driven The Machine on March 2, 2018 (but subsequently flipped again to the conventional sports talk format The Fan in April, in response to controversies surrounding the station's planned morning host Kevin Klein, who was coming from KBZT's San Francisco sister station KITS).

== Past programming ==
In 2007, FM 94/9 was one of at least five stations in the San Diego market playing modern rock music. However, on its website, FM 94/9 strived to be different from other radio stations by playing diverse music, broadcasting locally produced music and using a live and local airstaff.

During the October 2007 wildfires in the San Diego area, KBZT became the temporary home of local public radio station KPBS-FM 89.5 after power to the KPBS-FM/TV transmitter on Mount San Miguel was interrupted on the morning of October 23. Within three hours KBZT had agreed to air KPBS' wildfire coverage until a backup transmitter could be established from the station's studio tower on the San Diego State University campus, which occurred the next day.

In January 2010, "The Mikey Show" moved from KIOZ to KBZT. This program had been controversial while in syndication and was taken off air in March 2012 as a result.

In June 2012, "Brunch with Bob and Friends" ended an eight-year run at the station, moving to KOPA.

On October 19, 2015, Chris Cantore became co-host of the morning show with Steve Woods. Cantore had previously hosted mornings at KPRI but lost his job in September 2015 when that station became part of the contemporary Christian K-Love network. Cantore left in early 2017, and later joined KFMB-FM; the morning slot was replaced with Dana and Jayson. Dana and Jayson, in turn, left KBZT on January 22, 2020, due to budget cuts at Entercom. Both personalities along with producer Brett Finn had made the transcontinental move from Long Island, New York to Denver to host and produce the morning drive program at KBZT.

In 2017, KBZT served as the flagship radio station for the San Diego Padres. Station management claimed that its younger male demographic lined up with the Padres' desire to attract a young fan base, as well as improve sound quality from its previous home on XEPRS-AM. The Padres then moved to a new Entercom all-sports radio station, KWFN, in 2018.

In September 2020, Entercom (now Audacy) made many changes to its alternative stations, including KBZT, in order to cut costs amid the COVID-19 pandemic. All local hosts besides afternoon DJ Jeremy Pritchard were dismissed and replaced with out-of-town hosts. The station's specialty programs (like "Local 94/9" and "Legends of Alternative") also ended at this time.

== HD Radio ==
KBZT carries its alternative rock format on the standard analog and HD1 channels.

On their HD2 sub-channel, KBZT carried a reggae format as "Bob Radio", which is named after Bob Marley.

On September 17, 2014, KBZT launched a Dance/EDM format, branded as "Glow", on its HD3 sub-channel. The station stream was also available online as well.

In October 2021, the "Glow" format was dropped and replaced with the all-comedy format that formerly aired on KWFN-HD3.

In 2023, "Bob Radio" was dropped.
