= KGB-FM =

Classic rock radio station in San Diego

- San Diego, California; United States
- Broadcast area: San Diego, California
- Frequency: 101.5 MHz (HD Radio)
- Branding: 101.5 KGB

Programming
- Language: English
- Format: Classic rock
- Subchannels: HD2: Sports (KGB)

Ownership
- Owner: iHeartMedia; (iHM Licenses, LLC)
- Sister stations: KGB; KHTS-FM; KIOZ; KLSD; KMYI; KOGO; KSSX

History
- First air date: 1950
- Former call signs: KSON-FM (1950–1958); KGB-FM (1958–1968); KBKB (1968–1972)
- Call sign meaning: George Bowles (station manager of KGB AM, 1928–1931)

Technical information
- Licensing authority: FCC
- Facility ID: 34454
- Class: B
- ERP: 50,000 watts
- HAAT: 150 meters (490 ft)
- Transmitter coordinates: 32°43′48″N 117°5′6″W

Links
- Public license information: Public file; LMS
- Webcast: Listen live (via iHeartRadio)
- Website: 101kgb.iheart.com

KGB-FM (101.5 FM) is a commercial radio station licensed to San Diego, California, United States. It is owned by iHeartMedia and broadcasts a classic rock format. KGB-FM's studios are located in San Diego's Kearny Mesa neighborhood on the northeast side, and the transmitter is located in East San Diego east of Balboa Park.

The station has broadcast its content using the HD Radio digital transmission format since 2005.

== History ==
The 101.5 MHz frequency originally signed on the air in 1950 as KSON-FM, owned by Fred Rabel. It is the second-oldest FM station in San Diego; the former KFSD-FM at 94.1 FM (now KMYI) debuted in 1948. Rabel later sold the signal to Brown Broadcasting in 1958. KSON-FM was moved off the KSON AM tower on the corner of Highway 15 and Interstate 5 to the new site of sister station KGB (1360 AM) at 52nd Street and Kalmia. KSON-FM's call letters were changed to KGB-FM. In 1964, Brown Broadcasting hired Bill Drake to consult for the new KGB, and the format he installed there later became known as "Boss Radio". In 1968, KGB and KGB-FM were separated, and the latter became KBKB, a "beautiful music" station.

By 1972, Boss Radio on KGB was failing, and more focus was being given to KBKB. Brown Broadcasting hired Ron Jacobs to turn around the FM station. Jacobs' first move was to restore the KGB-FM call letters and to drop Boss Radio from 1360 AM. Jacobs created San Diego's first-ever freeform progressive album-oriented rock FM station, further nurtured by station general manager Sonny Jim Price. Among the innovations introduced during this era of KGB-FM is the station's "KGB Chicken" (now known as the "San Diego Chicken"), a series of records called the Homegrown albums, and the "Sky Show", a fireworks display set to rock music.

KGB-FM has hosted many of San Diego's radio and television personalities. Such hosts include Lawrence "Larry The Cruiser" Himmel, Bob "B.C." Coburn, Dave Benson, Damian Bragdon, Gabriel Wisdom, Erik Thompson, Jim McInnes, Rick Leibert, Patrick Martin, Larry Bruce, Bill Hergonson, Ernesto Gladden, Ted Edwards, Linda McInnes, Digby Welch, Kevin McKeown, Pamela Edwards, Brian Schock, Susan Hemphill, John Leslie, Andrew "Long Tall Andy" Geller, Blair and Kymythy Schultz, Phil Hendrie, Bruce Tucker, Jeff Prescott, Michael Berger, Susan "Sue" Delany, Coe Lewis, "Steve-O", Scott Chatfield, Cynthia "Spicy Cindy" Spicer, Ted "The Chicken" Giannoulas, and Mojo Nixon. KGB-FM news directors Brad Messer and Brent Seltzer were the original 'NEWS BROTHERS,' producing ratings with their Mid Day News & Comment. Others reading the news included Gerry Gazlay and George Wilson.

One longtime fixture on KGB-FM and San Diego rock radio was The DSC Show. The morning zoo program, hosted by Dave Rickards, Shelly Dunn, and Cookie "Chainsaw" Randolph, debuted on KGB-FM in 1990 as The Dawn Patrol. In 1994, the program moved to KIOZ (originally at 102.1 FM, now at 105.3), where it was renamed The Dave, Shelly and Chainsaw Show and aired for three years. Upon returning to KGB-FM in 1997, the show's name was shortened to The DSC, and from August 2, 2010 to July 19, 2018, the program was broadcast on KFMB-FM 100.7. Prior to the show's cancellation, co-host Shelly Dunn announced her retirement from radio broadcasting. On August 6, 2018, The DSC Show returned to KGB-FM once again, with the remainder of the cast, but ultimately ended in December 2022 when the hosts retired. The next month, "KGB Mornings with Sarah, Boyer and Clint" made its debut.

In 2026, KGB-FM stopped referring to itself on air as a classic rock station, adopting the slogan "San Diego’s ’80s, ’90s, and more". This coincided with the station broadening its playlist to include artists like The Killers, Third Eye Blind, and Oasis.

KGB-FM airs The Beatles Radio Show, hosted by Ken Dashow, on Sundays.

== Notable promotions ==
=== The World Famous 101 KGB-FM/San Diego Chicken ===
In 1974, KGB introduced the "KGB-FM 101 Chicken", an advertising mascot played by Ted Giannoulas. Ted, then a student at San Diego State University, was hired to wear a chicken outfit for a promotion to distribute KGB Easter eggs to children at the San Diego Wild Animal Park. The KGB Chicken, whose wacky but fun antics entertained steadily larger crowds, moved on to be featured at concerts and sporting events, including appearances at more than 520 consecutive San Diego Padres baseball games. Conflict emerged, however, between the station and Giannoulas, and he was dismissed in 1977. Another unnamed employee was hired to take his place, which triggered a lawsuit by Giannoulas.

After a court found his favor in June 1979, Giannoulas was allowed to continue performing in a chicken costume, but not the same as the original costume. His return, this time as the San Diego Chicken was witnessed by 47,000 people at what was called a "Grand Hatching" event, where he emerged from a Styrofoam egg as Also sprach Zarathustra (composed by Richard Strauss) played. Since then, Giannoulas and his alternate ego, The Chicken, have represented the city of San Diego and 101 KGB-FM.

=== Homegrown song contest and albums ===
In 1973, KGB-FM created an annual contest called "Homegrown," in which local singers and songwriters submitted songs about the San Diego area for inclusion on an album produced by the station. The songwriting contest was the brainchild of KGB-FM program director Ron Jacobs, who first held such an event at KHJ (AM) in Los Angeles. The Homegrown album series was introduced in response to the cancellation of the popular "Charity Ball" event at San Diego Stadium. Proceeds from sale of the albums were donated to local charities. The contest ran through 1978, yielding seven albums named Homegrown through Homegrown VII with copyrights from 1973 to 1979. There were two additional Homegrown albums: Homegrown's Greatest Hits (1978) with favorite selections from previous albums, and Homegrown '84 with additional songs by San Diego artists about the area.

- Homegrown (1973)
- Homegrown II (1974)
- Homegrown III (1975)
- Homegrown IV (1976)
- Homegrown V (1977)
- Homegrown Greatest Hits (1978)
- Homegrown VI (1978)
- Homegrown VII (1979)
- Homegrown '84 (1983)

In 1976, singer Stephen Bishop submitted his song "On and On." Still, it was rejected because he submitted it on cassette tape instead of the required reel-to-reel format. The song later went on to become a commercial hit.

=== Sky Show ===
In 1976, KGB-FM launched the annual "KGB Sky Show," which has been held almost continuously ever since. The "Sky Show" is a fireworks display, synchronized to a music soundtrack broadcast on the radio. This art form was invented by KGB and is now practiced worldwide. The first Sky Show was fired from Fiesta Island and Chollas Lake. It created traffic jams all over the city as people watched and listened. The firing site was moved to San Diego Stadium for reasons of crowd control. The show has become a very well-attended annual event, with fans viewing from both inside the stadium and outside, tailgating in the parking lot or from vantage points along Mission Valley's canyon rim. The KGB Sky Show also introduced Rock and Roll music, multimedia, video, theatrical lighting, and effects to enhance the fireworks display. According to its creator, Rick Leibert, Sky Show is a "continuing experiment blending the ancient art of fireworks with rock and roll." The creative team for Sky Show has been collaborating for more than 20 years. Blair Schultze has been a Writer/Producer/Director of the KGB Sky Show since 1988, and Ron Dixon has been a Fireworks coordinator since 1979 and choreographer since 1990.

== See also ==
- List of three-letter broadcast call signs in the United States
