= KMYI =

Hot adult contemporary radio station in San Diego

- San Diego, California; United States
- Broadcast area: San Diego metropolitan area
- Frequency: 94.1 MHz (HD Radio)
- Branding: Star 94-1

Programming
- Format: Hot adult contemporary
- Subchannels: HD2: KOGO simulcast (news/talk); HD3: Bilingual classic hits "Retro"
- Affiliations: Premiere Networks

Ownership
- Owner: iHeartMedia; (iHM Licenses, LLC)
- Sister stations: KGB; KGB-FM; KHTS-FM; KIOZ; KLSD; KOGO; KSSX

History
- First air date: 1949 (as KFSD-FM)
- Former call signs: KFSD-FM (1948–1961); KFSD (1961); KOGO-FM (1961–1972); KFSD-FM (1972–1997); KXGL (1997–1998); KJQY (1998–2001); KMSX (2001)
- Call sign meaning: "My" (previous station name)

Technical information
- Facility ID: 58821
- Class: B
- ERP: 77,000 watts
- HAAT: 210 meters (690 ft)
- Transmitter coordinates: 32.839°N 117.250°W

Links
- Webcast: Listen live (via iHeartRadio)
- Website: star941fm.iheart.com

KMYI (94.1 FM) is a commercial radio station in San Diego, California, airing a hot adult contemporary music format. It is owned by iHeartMedia. Its studios are located in San Diego's Kearny Mesa neighborhood on the northeast side, and the transmitter is located in La Jolla. It broadcasts from the KGTV Tower, shared with several other San Diego FM stations and its former sister station KGTV. KMYI is the oldest continuously operating FM station in the San Diego metropolitan area.

The station is the San Diego affiliate for On Air with Ryan Seacrest, and is one of the few hot AC stations to carry the program.

KMYI broadcasts in HD. It carries the news/talk programming of sister station KOGO on its HD2 sub-channel. In November 2018, KMYI activated an HD3 sub-channel, which aired a soft AC format branded as "The Breeze." It was off for a period of time but then came back on with a bilingual classic hits format branded as "Retro".

== History ==
=== Middle of the road (1949–1956) ===
The station signed on in 1949 using the call sign KFSD-FM and simulcasting KFSD (now KOGO). It carried the AM station's format of middle of the road music with news and personalities. As one of the earliest FM stations in Southern California, it was originally powered at 100,000 watts, and even today has more power (77,000 watts) than most of its rivals, which normally are limited to 50,000 watts.

=== Classical (1956–1997) ===
As FM radios became more available, especially among the affluent and audiophiles, KFSD-FM adopted a classical music format in 1956, for which it was known for nearly four decades.

=== Classic hits (1997–1998) ===
KFSD-FM was sold by Lotus Communications to Nationwide Communications in 1996. The new owners decided classical music would not have enough listeners and revenue, so the format was switched to classic hits as "94.1 The Eagle" on January 16, 1997, with the call letters KXGL. KXGL was acquired in 1998 by Jacor Communications, which was later acquired by Clear Channel Communications.

=== Adult contemporary (1998–2000) ===
On August 10, 1998, KXGL dropped the classic hits music format and call letters, switching to soft adult contemporary music as KJQY, known as K-Joy 94.1 to compete with leading AC station KYXY.

=== Oldies (2000–2001) ===
In 2000, KJQY changed to a new format called Soft Oldies. When oldies station KBZT left the format in November of that year, KJQY became a mainstream oldies station (later moving to 95.7 and 99.3 and rebranded as "KOOL").

=== Hot adult contemporary (2001–present) ===
==== Pre-launch poll; holiday music ====
On November 21, 2001, KJQY swapped formats and call letters with Mix 95.7, also owned by Clear Channel. The station, now with the placeholder KMSX calls, then began stunting with a loop of Christmas music. At the same time, the station administered a poll, asking listeners what they would like to hear, and later began informing listeners to find out the poll results at 3 p.m. on December 25, 2001.

==== My 94.1 ====
The stunting continued until the advertised date and time, which at that point, the station's callsign became KMYI, flipped to its present hot AC format and branded as "My 94.1". The first song under the hot AC format was "Breathe" by Faith Hill. For a time, KMYI was simulcast in Temecula on KMYT until December 2, 2004, when KMYT switched to a smooth jazz format.

==== Star 94-1 ====
On September 19, 2005, noted San Diego radio duo "Jeff and Jer" came to KMYI, and the station was rebranded as Star 94-1, picking up both the morning show and the moniker from KFMB-FM, which had switched to adult hits and joined Jack FM earlier in the year. The station adopted the "San Diego's Best Variety" slogan to reflect its broadcast area, although it has recently began using the corporate "More Music, More Variety" slogan on air.

Clear Channel Communications became iHeartMedia in 2014. Through all of the changes that have occurred since becoming a hot AC station, the one constant at KMYI had taken place during the final weeks of the year: Up until 2014, KMYI had an annual tradition of playing all Christmas music, returning to its regular hot AC format on December 26. This ended in 2015 to focus on New Year's Eve music content instead.

Today, KMYI's chief rivals are KYXY, which has moved closer to a hot AC format to gain younger listeners, and KXSN, which broadcasts a classic hits format and calls itself Sunny 98.1, competition for this station is established by playing songs from the 1990s at the bottom of each hour.

== Morning shows ==
KMYI has had many morning shows throughout the years:

When the station first flipped to hot AC in 2001, KMYI recruited Jagger and Kristi from KFMB-FM; their tenure lasted until summer 2005, when they would move to XHRM-FM.

Upon rebranding as "Star 94-1" in 2005, KMYI picked up the Jeff and Jer Showgram. It also added notable personality Delana, who originally came in to co-host with Jeff and Jer.

On August 20, 2009, Jeff and Jer exited KMYI, and were replaced by AJ Machado from sister Top 40 station KHTS-FM. On August 31, 2009, "AJ in the Morning" debuted on “Star” with most of the former "Playhouse" cast, with the exception of Geena The Latina, who remains at KHTS-FM.

In June 2012, the morning show was replaced with Jesse Lozano, who re-located to San Diego to host mornings on KMYI. Jesse also voicetracks in afternoons on KIIS-FM in Los Angeles, and is also known as Boy Toy Jesse.

On August 16, 2019, it was announced that Tati from sister station KSSX would move to KMYI as morning co-host with Jesse Lozano. The newly rebranded "Jesse and Tati" program debuted on August 26. This change comes as outgoing co-host Delana announced her move to the afternoon drive spot, in addition to her role on iHeart's Pride Radio network.
