= KXSN =

Classic hits radio station in San Diego

- San Diego, California; United States
- Broadcast area: San Diego–Chula Vista–Carlsbad Metropolitan Area
- Frequency: 98.1 MHz (HD Radio)
- Branding: Sunny 98.1

Programming
- Language: English
- Format: Classic hits
- Subchannels: HD2: Channel Q

Ownership
- Owner: Audacy, Inc.; (Audacy License, LLC)
- Sister stations: KBZT; KSON; KWFN; KYXY

History
- First air date: February 4, 1960; 66 years ago
- Former call signs: KJLM (1960–1967); KDIG (1967–1978); KIFM (1978–2016)
- Call sign meaning: "Sunny"

Technical information
- Licensing authority: FCC
- Facility ID: 34589
- Class: B
- ERP: 26,500 watts
- HAAT: 209 meters (686 ft)
- Transmitter coordinates: 32.838°N 117.250°W

Links
- Public license information: Public file; LMS
- Webcast: Listen live (via Audacy)
- Website: www.audacy.com/sunny981sd

KXSN (98.1 FM) is a commercial radio station in San Diego, California, branded Sunny 98.1. Owned by Audacy, Inc., the station airs a classic hits radio format. The station's studios and offices are located in San Diego's Stonecrest area, off Granite Ridge Drive, and its transmitter is off La Jolla Scenic Drive South in La Jolla.

== History ==
=== Middle of the road (1960–1974) ===
The station first signed on the air on February 4, 1960, as KJLM. It was owned by E. Edward Jacobson and it operated at only 4,500 watts, a fraction of its current power. The station aired what it described as a "good music" format, a mix of middle of the road (MOR) and easy listening music.

In 1968, Jacobson changed the station's call sign to KDIG but remained as owner and president, and continued the MOR format.

The station changed hands in 1971, getting sold to West Coast Media.

=== Soft rock (1974–1987) ===
In 1974, the call letters were switched to KIFM and the format moved to what West Coast described as "mellow music", a mix of soft rock and soft adult contemporary. In the 1980s, KIFM experimented with a contemporary jazz program at night, called "Lights Out San Diego".

=== Smooth jazz (1987–2011) ===
In September 1987, as Lights Out San Diego gained in popularity, KIFM went with smooth jazz around the clock as "Smooth Jazz 98.1".

In 1996, KIFM was bought by Jefferson-Pilot Broadcasting for $28.75 million. In April 2006, Jefferson-Pilot would be acquired by Lincoln Financial Group. The media division became Lincoln Financial Media.

During smooth jazz's popularity, KIFM was one of the top rated stations in San Diego and was the 2005 winner of the Marconi Award.

=== Rhythmic adult contemporary (2011–2013) ===
In the Summer of 2011, as the smooth jazz format began to age, KIFM shifted its format to smooth adult contemporary, airing mostly pop artists with R&B roots, such as Michael Jackson, Whitney Houston, Madonna and Anita Baker, with only an occasional Smooth Jazz instrumental, and rebranded as "98.1 Smooth FM".

By the fall of that year, the station shifted to Rhythmic AC, playing recent and older R&B hits and classic soul tracks. When the HD Radio transmitter went on air, the original smooth jazz format moved to KIFM's HD2 subchannel.

=== Soft adult contemporary (2013–2016) ===
Without warning on August 19, 2013, at 10 am, KIFM flipped to Soft AC as "Easy 98.1". The rebranding came after KIFM trailed San Diego's longtime AC leader KYXY in the Arbitron ratings reports. The final song on "Smooth" was "I Love You Always Forever" by Donna Lewis, while the first song on "Easy" was "Easy" by The Commodores. After the flip, the station's ratings improved dramatically, reaching No. 1 in several Arbitron ratings periods. At the same time, KYXY, like many stations that were originally Soft AC, has moved closer to a more Hot AC format to attract younger listeners.

On December 8, 2014, Entercom a media company, announced its acquisition of Lincoln Financial Group's entire 15-station lineup which included KIFM, in a deal worth $106.5 million. As part of the agreement, Entercom would operate the stations under a Local Marketing Agreement (LMA) until the sale received approval from the Federal Communications Commission (FCC). The FCC approved the merger on July 14, 2015, and the sale was officially completed on July 17, allowing Entercom to assume ownership of the stations.

=== Adult contemporary (2016–2017) ===
On April 21, 2016, at 5 pm, after playing "Sundown" by Gordon Lightfoot, KIFM rebranded as "Sunny 98.1", and relaunched its adult contemporary format, this time moving in a more contemporary direction. The first song on "Sunny" was "Walking on Sunshine" by Katrina & the Waves. Prior to the change, the station had led the San Diego market with a 6.2 share in the March 2016 Nielsen Audio PPM ratings, making for a rare situation where a radio station at the top of the market ratings changed formats (though it was speculated the station made the change due to low advertising revenues with the previous format). On April 28, 2016, KIFM changed callsigns to KXSN to match the "Sunny" moniker. Concurrently, the KIFM callsign was moved to a co-owned sports radio station in Sacramento, AM 1320 KCTC. Despite the call letter switch, the KXSN HD2 subchannel is referred to as "Smooth Jazz KIFM" as a tribute to the classic Smooth Jazz station.

=== Classic hits (2017–present) ===
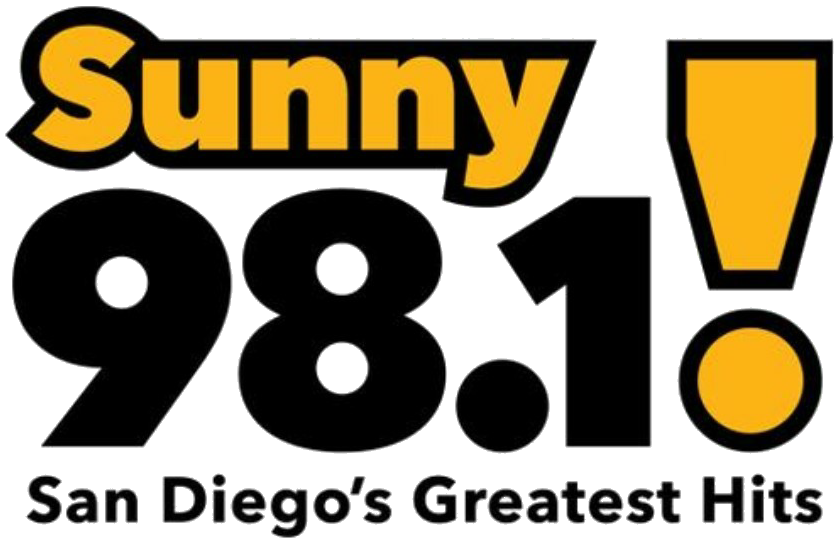
Logo under previous slogan

On July 24, 2017, KXSN switched to classic hits, and retained the "Sunny 98.1" branding. This returned the classic hits format to the market for the first time since 2000, when KJQY became a hot AC station. It was the second time that the 98.1 FM frequency changed formats despite leading the market, this time with a 6.2 share in the June 2017 Nielsen Audio ratings. The change came because of the merger between station owner Entercom and CBS Radio, then-owner of soon-to-be sister station KYXY, as it would eliminate playlist overlap between the two stations. Entercom completed the acquisition of KYXY on November 17. In January 2018, KXSN's studios relocated from Mission Valley to Murphy Canyon.

In November 2018, KXSN-HD3 began carrying the LGBTQ-targeted "Channel Q" network featuring a talk/dance music format originating from sister station KQPS in Palm Springs.

In September 2020, Entercom began restructuring radio formats and regionalizing its programming offerings. As part of this plan, on January 20, 2021, KXSN began voice-tracking talent from KRTH in Los Angeles. Greg Simms hosts the station's morning show, while KRTH midday personality Lara Scott and evening host Larry Morgan will assume those same time slots on KXSN. Simms has previously worked in the San Diego market on KFMB-FM in the 1990s and 2000s.
