= KYXY =

Adult contemporary radio station in San Diego

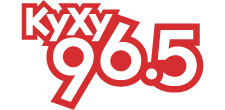
- San Diego, California; United States
- Broadcast area: San Diego, California - Tijuana, Baja California
- Frequency: 96.5 MHz (HD Radio)
- Branding: KyXy 96.5 (pronounced "kick-see")

Programming
- Language: English
- Format: Adult contemporary

Ownership
- Owner: Audacy, Inc.; (Audacy License, LLC)
- Sister stations: KBZT; KSON; KWFN; KXSN

History
- First air date: 1960
- Former call signs: KFMX (1960–71)
- Call sign meaning: A derivation of formerly co-owned KIXI in Seattle

Technical information
- Licensing authority: FCC
- Facility ID: 51671
- Class: B
- ERP: 26,500 watts
- HAAT: 210 meters (690 ft)
- Transmitter coordinates: 32.839°N 117.250°W

Links
- Public license information: Public file; LMS
- Webcast: Listen live (via Audacy)
- Website: www.audacy.com/kyxy

KYXY (96.5 FM) is a commercial radio station owned by Audacy, Inc. KYXY is licensed to San Diego, California, with its studios in the city's Stonecrest area. Its transmitter site is in La Jolla, on the KGTV Tower which it shares with KGTV and several other San Diego FM stations. KYXY airs a mainstream adult contemporary radio format.

KyXy 96.5 broadcasts in HD Radio. The programming on the station's HD2 channel was FlashBack ALT, airing alternative rock music of the 1980s and 1990s. It has since been turned off.

KYXY was also the San Diego Radio Disney affiliate (on HD Radio) until June 2018.

== History ==
KYXY first signed on in 1960 as KFMX. It changed its callsign to KYXY (pronounced "kick-see") in the late 1960s after being bought by Walter Nelskog, who also owned stations KIXI in Seattle and KYXI in Portland. The station has kept the same KYXY call letters ever since. It was an independent FM station, carrying a middle of the road music format, which was described as "Good Music." KYXY transitioned to an adult contemporary format in late 1970s and has mostly retained the format. However, the station has become more upbeat within the last decade in an effort to attract younger listeners. Since 1981, the KFMX calls have been assigned to a mainstream rock station in Lubbock, Texas.

On February 2, 2017, CBS Radio announced it would merge with Entercom. The merger was approved on November 9, 2017, and was completed on November 17.

In January 2018, KYXY moved out of its longtime Linda Vista studios and re-located to Stonecrest.

The station most recently adopted its current slogan in January 2019.

== Special programming ==
- As a mainstream AC station, KYXY plays all Christmas songs from mid-November until Christmas night.
- In June 2009, the weekend after Michael Jackson's death, the station paid tribute to the singer by playing continuous Michael Jackson and Jackson 5 hits.

At one time, KYXY aired the syndicated Delilah's in evenings, but dropped the program as the station moved to a more upbeat direction. From 2005 to 2008, Love Songs with Kris Toledo aired Monday-Friday 7 p.m. to midnight, hosted live by Kristin Cruz. Previously, the syndicated Intelligence for Your Life with John Tesh aired in evenings, and returned in May 2020.

== HD programming ==
KYXY formerly broadcast The Crossing, a contemporary Christian music format that was operated by Azusa Pacific University, on its HD2 subchannel. The HD3 subchannel started broadcasting classic alternative in 2018, first as 96.5 The Flash (in reference to former alternative station XHRM from the mid-1990s), and then as FlashBack ALT.

As of 2020, "The Crossing" is no longer a part of KYXY programming, which resulted in moving Flashback ALT to the HD2 and switching the HD3 off. As of 2023, "FlashBack ALT" is no longer a part of KYXY programming.
