= KLNV =

Regional Mexican radio station in San Diego

- San Diego, California; United States
- Broadcast area: San Diego County, California; Tijuana, Baja California, Mexico
- Frequency: 106.5 MHz (HD Radio)
- Branding: Qué Buena 106.5

Programming
- Format: Regional Mexican
- Subchannels: HD2: TUDN Radio

Ownership
- Owner: Uforia Audio Network; (Univision Radio Stations Group, Inc.)
- Sister stations: KLQV

History
- First air date: June 26, 1960
- Former call signs: KPRI (1960–1984); KLZZ (1984); KLZZ-FM (1984–1987); KKLQ-FM (1987–1997); KKLQ (1997–1998); KEBN (1998)
- Call sign meaning: "La Nueva" (previous branding)

Technical information
- Licensing authority: FCC
- Facility ID: 51515
- Class: B
- ERP: 50,000 watts
- HAAT: 134 meters (440 ft)
- Transmitter coordinates: 32°43′19.2″N 117°4′10.1″W

Links
- Public license information: Public file; LMS
- Webcast: Listen live
- Website: www.univision.com/radio/san-diego-klnv-fm/que-buena-106-5-fm

KLNV (106.5 FM, "Qué Buena 106.5") is a regional Mexican radio station licensed to San Diego, California, United States, broadcasting to the San Diego metropolitan area. It is owned by TelevisaUnivision, and is a part of the Uforia Audio Network. Studios are located on West Broadway in San Diego, with its antenna located near 60th Street and Tooley Street in San Diego's Emerald Hills neighborhood, and is co-located with KOGO.

== History ==
The station started as KPRI in 1960 and broadcast an MOR-easy listening format with the slogan "Island of Capri" (K-PRI); Beginning in December 1967, it began airing a freeform format in the overnight hours (midnight to 3 a.m.), which would become full-time by June 1968, and would later evolve into album-oriented rock by 1973.

In January 1984, the station flipped to an adult contemporary format as KLZZ, "Class FM". KLZZ switched formats once again in September 1986, to classic rock as "California Classics", retaining the KLZZ callsign.

On March 5, 1987, at 6 p.m., after KLZZ was purchased by Edens Broadcasting, KLZZ flipped to a dance-leaning Top 40 format, branded as "Q106" and adopted the KKLQ call letters. The first song on "Q106" was "Sign o' the Times" by Prince. KKLQ was also heard on KOGO, 600 AM, as part of a simulcast, and later on now-Talk formatted KCBQ. Q106 was co-owned with KKBQ (93Q) in Houston, Texas, KOY-FM (Y95) in Phoenix, Arizona, WRBQ-FM (Q105) in Tampa, Florida, and WRVQ (Q94) in Richmond, Virginia. All five stations were top 40 stations. Edens also owned WWDE (2WD) in Norfolk, Virginia, during this time, but that station was adult contemporary. Q106 competed against KFMB-FM ("B100").

Q106 enjoyed high ratings success, as the station was ranked #1 for 12 continuous ratings periods. However, in April 1990, XHITZ-FM flipped from classic rock to a dance-leaning CHR format as "Jammin' Z90", which took away much of Q106's audience. To counter this, the station shifted towards a more mainstream Top 40 format by early 1991. In 1992, Edens went into receivership, as the company lost large amounts of money due to the fallout of WRBQ from competitor WFLZ-FM. Par Broadcasting, owned by local brewing company mogul Leon Parma, bought the station that year. Ratings slightly improved, but not to the unprecedented levels the station attained in the beginning.

Jacor, the owners of WFLZ who also purchased KECR-FM, bought the station in early 1997. Morning hosts Jeff and Jer left for KFMB-FM (which flipped to hot AC as "Star 100.7" in June 1994) in April 1997 due to tensions between the duo and the new owners. In addition, the station shifted towards a more adult lean. The station's ratings still did not improve.

In July 1998, due to Jacor's merger with Nationwide Communications and in order to meet ownership limits, KKLQ was sold to Hispanic Broadcasting Company, forerunner to today's Uforia Audio Network, who announced a format change to Regional Mexican. During the last week of July, KKLQ aired "11 Years of the Q", airing various airchecks, jingles, and promotions from the station's 11-year history, while also redirecting listeners to KHTS-FM. After the farewell concluded, during the first week of August, KKLQ began stunting with a loop of "Macarena" by Los Del Rio, and again redirected listeners to KHTS. KKLQ officially flipped to the new format on August 10 of that year. The current KLNV call letters would be adopted on October 12, 1998.

In March 2016, KLNV rebranded as "Qué Buena 106.5". Three years later, Univision placed all their radio stations into the Uforia mobile application and platform; this took effect on March 15, 2019.
