= KGTV =

Television station in San Diego

- San Diego, California; United States
- Channels: Digital: 10 (VHF); Virtual: 10
- Branding: ABC 10

Programming
- Affiliations: 10.1: ABC; for others, see § Subchannels

Ownership
- Owner: E. W. Scripps Company; (Scripps Broadcasting Holdings LLC)

History
- First air date: September 13, 1953
- Former call signs: KFSD-TV (1953–1961); KOGO-TV (1961–1972)
- Former channel numbers: Analog: 10 (VHF, 1953–2009); Digital: 25 (UHF, 1999–2009)
- Former affiliations: NBC (1953–1977)
- Call sign meaning: Callsign was changed from KOGO-TV after FCC regulations implied that a radio and TV station cannot share the same call letters unless they are both owned by the same company at that time

Technical information
- Licensing authority: FCC
- Facility ID: 40876
- ERP: 20.7 kW
- HAAT: 227 m (745 ft)
- Transmitter coordinates: 32°50′20″N 117°14′59″W
- Translator(s): KZSD-LD 20 (UHF) San Diego (city)

Links
- Public license information: Public file; LMS
- Website: www.10news.com

KGTV (channel 10) is a television station in San Diego, California, United States, affiliated with ABC and owned by the E. W. Scripps Company. The station's studios are located on Air Way in the Riverview-Webster section of San Diego, and its transmitter is located on Mount Soledad in La Jolla.

KGTV operates digital translator KZSD-LD (channel 20), which allows homes with issues receiving KGTV's VHF signal or only a UHF antenna to receive KGTV in some form.

== History ==
The San Diego area's third-oldest television station first went on the air on September 13, 1953, as NBC affiliate KFSD-TV. The station's original owner was Airfan Radio Corporation, which also owned NBC Radio Network affiliate KFSD (600 AM, now KOGO). Under terms of the initial construction permit award, Airfan sold one-third ownership of the stations to two other firms who competed separately for channel 10. In 1954, the KFSD stations were purchased by investment firm, Fox, Wells & Rogers. The publishers of Newsweek magazine took a minority (about 46 percent) share of the stations in 1957, four years before the periodical was itself sold to the Washington Post Company. In 1961, channel 10 changed its call sign to KOGO-TV; the radio stations also adopted the KOGO call sign.

The broadcasting division of Time-Life acquired KOGO-TV and its sister radio stations in 1962. This deal was reached after failed attempts to sell the properties to Triangle Publications and United Artists among others; and after the Washington Post Company's Post-Newsweek Stations division disclosed it was not interested in acquiring full ownership.

As part of a sale announced in late 1970, KOGO-AM-FM-TV was sold to McGraw-Hill along with Time-Life's other radio/television combinations in Denver, Indianapolis and Grand Rapids, Michigan; and KERO-TV in upstate Bakersfield. When the sale was concluded in June 1972, the purchase price for the entire group was just over $57 million. However, to comply with the Federal Communications Commission (FCC)'s new restrictions on concentration of media ownership, McGraw-Hill was required to sell the radio stations in San Diego, Indianapolis, Denver, and Grand Rapids. Time-Life would later take WOOD-TV in Grand Rapids out of the final deal. KERO-TV, KLZ-TV (now KMGH-TV) in Denver, and WFBM-TV (now WRTV) in Indianapolis were retained by McGraw-Hill along with KOGO-TV, which changed to its current call letters KGTV on June 1 as a result of the sale due to FCC regulations in place at the time that prohibited TV and radio stations in the same market, but different ownership from sharing the same callsigns.

=== Switch to ABC ===
The ABC affiliation in San Diego had belonged to XETV (channel 6), a station licensed across the international border to Tijuana, Mexico, since 1956. ABC and XETV were required to obtain special permission from the FCC, renewed annually, for the network to provide its programming to XETV via the "bicycling" delivery method. In 1973, KCST-TV (channel 39), San Diego's UHF independent station, prevailed in a years-long attempt to contest this arrangement and secure ABC programming in the market; KCST claimed that ABC should no longer be affiliated with a station located in Mexico when there was now a third U.S.-based station which could carry its programming. At the time of the switch, ABC was still the third-ranked network, behind second-rated NBC and perennial leader CBS.

Over the next several years, however, ABC began to experience ratings growth in their prime time programming and rose to first place during 1975–76, finishing the year with ten programs in Nielsen's top twenty. In San Diego, KCST-TV experienced a carryover effect and also rose to first place locally, knocking KGTV down to third behind CBS station KFMB-TV (channel 8). But ABC was never happy with having been forced onto the UHF dial in San Diego, and the unprecedented success gave the network the impetus to actively upgrade its affiliate roster nationwide.

Despite having more than a year remaining in its current agreement with NBC, KGTV announced it was joining ABC in June 1976. After KCST-TV (now KNSD) signed with NBC, the switch between the two stations took place on June 27, 1977.

In 1994, as part of repercussions stemming from CBS' acquisition of KCNC-TV and KUTV, McGraw-Hill signed a long-term deal with ABC that would keep KGTV as an affiliate of the network (it remains an ABC affiliate to this day). As a condition of that agreement, television stations in other cities, including KUSA in Denver and KBAK-TV in Bakersfield, would lose their ABC affiliations to competing McGraw-Hill-owned stations (KMGH-TV, KERO-TV) in those cities.

KGTV shut down its analog signal, over VHF channel 10, on February 17, 2009, the original target date on which full-power television stations in the United States were to transition from analog to digital broadcasts under federal mandate (which was later pushed back to June 12, 2009). The station's digital signal relocated from its pre-transition UHF channel 25 to VHF channel 10.

On October 3, 2011, McGraw-Hill announced it was selling its entire television station group, including KGTV and Azteca América affiliate KZSD-LP, to the Cincinnati-based E. W. Scripps Company for $212 million. The deal was completed on December 30, 2011.

Due to their current Scripps ownership, the station makes disclaimers regularly, especially in its medical reporting, that it has no ties to the local Scripps Health system, a completely separate organization created in 1923 from a bequest from Ellen Browning Scripps, a sister to Scripps founder E. W. Scripps, as Scripps Health personnel are regularly asked to comment on medical stories in the San Diego area, including by KGTV.

== News operation ==
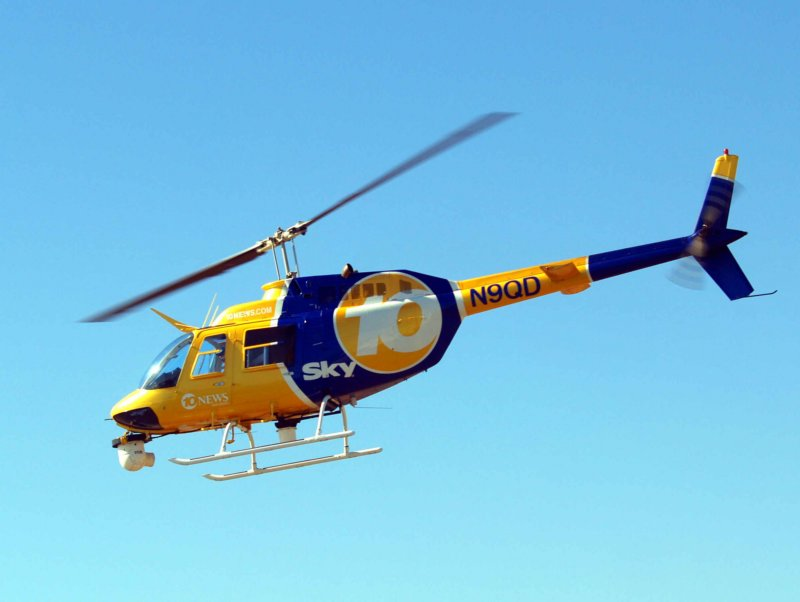
10 News helicopter "Sky10"

KGTV presently broadcasts 44 hours of locally produced newscasts each week (with seven hours each weekday and 4 1/2 hours each on Saturdays and Sundays). In addition, the station produces the sports highlight program Sports Xtra at 11:30 p.m. on Saturday and Sunday evenings. Of note, KGTV, along with KNSD and Fox affiliate KSWB-TV (channel 69), is one of three San Diego television stations with a 4 p.m. newscast. Entitled The NOW San Diego, KGTV's 4 p.m. newscast originally premiered under the title 10-4 in 2009.

KGTV first began to challenge the longstanding local news dominance of KFMB in the mid-1970s, when anchors Jack White and Harold Greene, along with popular weather anchor "Captain Mike" Ambrose and sportscasters Al Coupee and Hal Clement, led the station's newscasts (then simply titled The News) to first place in the ratings, albeit briefly. Even with the brief return of Greene following his stints in San Francisco and Los Angeles, the station fell back to second place behind KFMB in the early 1980s. However, management succeeded in hiring away popular anchor Michael Tuck from KFMB in 1984; the move resulted in KGTV reclaiming first place and giving the station credibility by way of Tuck's high-profile nightly commentaries titled "Perspectives".

KGTV also made history by being the first station in San Diego with a female anchor team on its 11 p.m. newscast, featuring Carol LeBeau and Bree Walker. After Walker left in 1987, Kimberly Hunt would team with LeBeau and form the city's longest-running anchor duo at 15 years. During that time, LeBeau and Hunt would anchor alongside Tuck (who left for KCBS-TV in Los Angeles in 1990, only to return to San Diego nine years later on KFMB), Stephen Clark (later at sister station WXYZ-TV in Detroit but now retired), Steve Wolford (later at sister station KTNV-TV and now with KSNV in Las Vegas), and a returning Hal Clement (who had switched from sports to news duties in 1983 while working at KFMB).

Eventually, KGTV would decline after Hunt left for an anchor position at KUSI-TV (channel 51) alongside Tuck; at one point, the station fell to third place as KNSD's news viewership rose to first place in the 11 p.m. timeslot. The Hunt-Lebeau team was reunited in early 2008, before LeBeau retired from the station the following year. On August 30, 2008, KGTV became the third television station in the San Diego market (after KFMB-TV and KSWB-TV) to broadcast its local newscasts in high definition. Since the Scripps purchase of KGTV was completed at the end of 2011, the station has entered into a news and weather partnership with its former AM radio sister KOGO (now owned by iHeartMedia). In May 2010, KGTV had the top-rated early evening newscast in the San Diego market in the coveted demographic of adults between 25 and 54 years old.

=== Notable current on-air staff ===
- Virginia Cha – anchor
- Kimberly Hunt – chief & primary anchor, managing editor
- Anne State – anchor

=== Notable former on-air staff ===
- Mona Kosar Abdi – general assignment reporter
- Harold Greene – anchor/reporter (1974–1977 and 1980–1982)
- Jim Hill – sports reporter
- Lisa Kim – anchor (1986–1994)
- Paul Magers – anchor/reporter (1981–1983)
- Byron Miranda – meteorologist
- Kent Ninomiya – reporter (1991–1993)
- Regis Philbin – local talk show host (1961–1964)
- Sarah Purcell – talk show host (late 1970s)
- Billy Ray Smith – sportscaster (1993–1997)
- Michael Tuck – anchor (1984–1990)
- Bree Walker – anchor/reporter (1980–1987)

== Subchannels ==
The station's signal is multiplexed:

Subchannels of KGTV
Subchannel	Res.	Short name	Programming
10.1	720p	KGTV-HD	ABC
10.2	480i	Bounce	Bounce TV
10.3	480i	Grit	Grit
10.4	480i	Mystery	Ion Mystery
10.5	480i	Laff	Laff
10.6	480i	Busted	Busted
10.7	480i	HSN	HSN
10.8	480i	QVC	QVC

Until October 2012, the station has carried TheCoolTV on its second digital subchannel. It was later replaced with the Live Well Network.

On April 15, 2015, LWN was replaced with Laff.

On May 1, 2017, Scripps took over the affiliation for the MeTV classic television network in San Diego, and placed the subchannel on KGTV-DT2, along with an analog simulcast on KZSD-LP; two months earlier the Azteca affiliation moved to XHDTV-TDT2 temporarily, then to XHAS-TDT on July 1, all of which involved the move of The CW affiliation from XETV to MeTV's former slot on KFMB-DT2, and Telemundo from XHAS to KNSD-DT20 (now KUAN-LD). During an interim period from mid-March to the end of April that year, KGTV-DT2 carried a continuous loop of the latest newscast produced by the station.

On November 15, 2024, Scripps News has been replaced with Laff, as Scripps News has switched its focus on streaming, ending over-the-air broadcast.

=== Translator ===
City of license	Callsign	Channel	ERP	HAAT	Facility ID	Transmitter coordinates
San Diego	KZSD-LD	20	7.3 kW	592 m (1,942 ft)	57054	32°41′46.6″N 116°56′10.3″W

== See also ==
- KGTV Tower
