= KWFN =

Sports radio station in San Diego

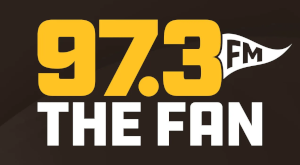
- San Diego, California; United States
- Broadcast area: San Diego-Tijuana
- Frequency: 97.3 MHz (HD Radio)
- Branding: 97.3 The Fan

Programming
- Language: English
- Format: Sports radio
- Subchannels: HD2: The Bet (Sports gambling)
- Affiliations: Westwood One Sports; Navy Midshipmen; San Diego Padres; Sports USA Radio Network

Ownership
- Owner: Audacy, Inc.; (Audacy License, LLC)
- Sister stations: KBZT; KSON; KXSN; KYXY

History
- First air date: January 15, 1964; 62 years ago
- Former call signs: KSEA (1964–1975); KSON-FM (1975–1997); KSON (1997–1998); KSON-FM (1998–2009); KSON (2009–2017); KEGY (2017–2018)
- Call sign meaning: "Fan"

Technical information
- Licensing authority: FCC
- Facility ID: 30832
- Class: B
- ERP: 38,000 watts
- HAAT: 152 meters (499 ft)
- Transmitter coordinates: 32°43′48″N 117°05′06″W
- Repeaters: 97.3 KWFN-FM1 (La Jolla); 97.3 KWFN-FM2 (Ramona); 97.3 KWFN-FM3 (San Marcos); 97.3 KWFN-FM4 (Escondido); 97.3 KWFN-FM5 (Encinitas)

Links
- Public license information: Public file; LMS
- Webcast: Listen live (via Audacy); Listen live (via Audacy) (HD2)
- Website: www.audacy.com/973thefansd

KWFN (97.3 FM) – branded as 97.3 The Fan – is a commercial sports radio station licensed to serve San Diego, California. Owned by Audacy, Inc., the station covers both the Greater San Diego market and the San Diego–Tijuana transborder agglomeration, and is the flagship station for the San Diego Padres Radio Network, in addition to being the market affiliate for Westwood One Sports.

The KWFN studios are located in San Diego's Stonecrest neighborhood, while the main station transmitter resides in San Diego's Emerald Hills neighborhood; to expand KWFN's overall reach, the station also utilizes a series of booster relays synchronized with the main signal. In addition to a standard analog transmission, KWFN and the booster relay network broadcast over two HD Radio digital subchannels, and is available online via Audacy.

== History ==
=== Country (1964–2017) ===
97.3 first signed on as KSEA on January 15, 1964. It was owned by Broodmoor Broadcasting, along with KSON (1240 AM). The two stations simulcast their programming. In its early days, KSEA was powered at 25,000 watts, using an antenna at only 220 feet in height above average terrain. Today, KWFN's power and antenna height are double that of KSEA. As of 1998, KSEA is a Regional Mexican station in Greenfield, California.

In 1967, 97.3 began its long run as a country music station, still simulcast with its AM sister station. In 1975, the station call sign was changed to KSON-FM to match its co-owned AM station. KSON-FM had previously been used on stations at 101.5 and at 105.3.

In 1985, Jefferson-Pilot Communications acquired KSON-AM-FM. The company filed an application in 1989 to construct a single full-on repeater to help improve KSON-FM's coverage in the rapidly growing suburbs of Northern San Diego County. Plans were cancelled in 1991. In 2003, Jefferson-Pilot instead acquired another station at 92.1 FM, licensed to Escondido, and converted it into a simulcast for KSON-FM to cover Northern San Diego County. The new repeater's call sign became KSOQ-FM, similar to KSON-FM's call letters.

Jefferson-Pilot became Lincoln Financial Media when it was acquired by the Lincoln Financial Group in 2006.

In 2007, KSON-FM was nominated for the "Top 25 Markets Country Music Station of The Year" award by the Radio & Records magazine. Other nominees included WUSN Chicago, KYGO-FM Denver, WYCD Detroit, KEEY-FM Minneapolis, and WXTU Philadelphia.

On March 1, 2009, the station dropped the FM suffix and became KSON, as the AM station was sold and changed its call letters to KNSN.

In January 2014, in honor of the January 31 San Diego stop on George Strait's farewell tour, KSON temporarily re-branded as "George FM". The station added more George Strait music to its playlist, and held on-air giveaways of memorabilia and tickets to the San Diego show.

On December 8, 2014, Entercom announced its acquisition of KSON's parent company Lincoln Financial Media. The transaction was approved on July 17, 2015.

=== Top 40 (2017–2018) ===
Three years later, Entercom merged with CBS Radio on November 17, 2017. KSON's simulcast partner KSOQ-FM was spun off to the Educational Media Foundation to comply with FCC ownership caps.

The merger placed KSON in common ownership with Top 40/CHR-formatted KEGY, Energy 103-7 – which had a better signal in Northern San Diego County, home to most of KSON’s core audience. Immediately after the merger closed, the country format was moved to 103.7; for the next three days, 97.3 stunted with a message loop redirecting listeners to the new frequency. On November 20, the station assumed 103.7's CHR format and branding as Energy 97-3.

In January 2018, KEGY moved out of its longtime Linda Vista studios and relocated to Stonecrest.

=== Hot talk (2018) ===
Following the move of Energy to 97.3, KEGY's ratings nosedived, from a 2.2 share to a 1.0 in the Nielsen Audio ratings. In February 2018, Entercom announced it had hired former Mighty 1090 morning host Dan Sileo; he was slated to host a new program on one of Entercom's San Diego stations, with Sileo saying on social media that he would be able to talk about "anything". On February 19, the San Diego Padres announced that the team's radio broadcasts would move from sister station KBZT to KEGY for the 2018 season, intensifying speculation that Entercom intended to flip 97.3 to a sports radio format.

On March 1, 2018, at 2 p.m., KEGY began stunting with rock music and no imaging, although notably playing "Welcome to the Machine" by Pink Floyd at the top of each hour. Two days later, KEGY flipped to hot talk as 97.3 The Machine. Its daytime lineup on weekdays featured Dan Sileo in middays, and The Mens Room from KISW/Seattle in afternoon drive. Blocks of classic rock music interspersed with comedy bits were broadcast on nights and weekends. The station would carry coverage of San Diego Padres games, with hour-long pre- and post-game shows. A morning show, Kevin Klein Live (moving from sister station KITS/San Francisco) was scheduled to premiere on March 29, 2018, coinciding with Major League Baseball's Opening Day.

The 103.7 frequency had previously aired a hot talk format as part of CBS Radio's former Free FM network.

==== Kevin Klein Live controversy ====
A promotional campaign for Kevin Klein Live featured social media posts containing the slogan "JUMP ... to a new morning show". One of the ads featured this caption on a photograph of the San Diego–Coronado Bridge. Listeners considered this ad to be insensitive, as the second-largest number of suicide deaths from bridge jumping in the U.S. have occurred on the bridge.

The campaign resulted in calls for the Padres to cut their ties with Entercom. The team issued a statement the next day, condemning the ad as being "offensive, insensitive and completely unacceptable." The team said the expansion of Padres coverage was planned before the team learned the full extent of the format changes, and requested that Entercom apologize for Klein's behavior. Padres chairman Ron Fowler criticized KEGY's new format as being "almost shock jock radio" and contradictory to his opinion that baseball is "family entertainment." Fowler said the team would reevaluate its relationship with KEGY. The photographer of the bridge image also accused the station of having used it without permission.

Klein issued a public apology for the ads, stating that "I know I've upset many people in America's Finest City, and this is something I regret. The comment was reprehensible and inexcusable. I've failed at making a good first impression, but I hope that you will give me another chance to provide entertainment and good-natured laughs when I go on the air on Thursday morning. Once again, I apologize to all the listeners and the city of San Diego." The premiere was cancelled indefinitely, and neither Entercom or Klein made any public statements regarding the program or if it would premiere at all. Klien has since moved to KROQ in Los Angeles, first hosting afternoons with Ted Stryker before taking over the morning drive slot in 2021.

=== Sports talk (2018–present) ===
On April 11, 2018, Entercom announced that it would drop The Machine and its hot talk format, and would relaunch KEGY as a conventional sports talk station, 97.3 The Fan, at 5 a.m. the following day. Entercom San Diego market manager Bob Bolinger said the company had used the Kevin Klein controversy as an opportunity to reevaluate KEGY's programming, and explained that "the station was always going to be largely about sports and we determined the right thing to do was to go 100% all-in." Padres chairman Ron Fowler was pleased that Entercom was willing to address the team's concerns surrounding the station's content, and that the revamp "better reflects the values of the Padres and the San Diego community as a whole." As part of the relaunch, Dan Sileo was moved to mornings, The Men's Room was dropped, and the station also acquired The Jim Rome Show previously heard on XEPRS. The Doug Gottlieb Show was also picked up for the weekday lineup. Its call letters were changed to KWFN.

In the first three months of the all-sports format, KWFN was among the lowest-rated stations in the market, with Sileo's morning show unable to tabulate a Nielsen Audio rating due to its small number of listeners. The Padres' last-place standing during the 2018 season also hindered the station's ratings.

On April 17, 2019, Sileo left KWFN's morning show but remained with Entercom, hosting a weekend program on co-owned WEEI-FM in Boston. Sileo was replaced by "Coach" John Kentera. The San Diego Union-Tribune speculated that Sileo's departure was tied to listener backlash surrounding plans to have Padres staff members appear on his show for interviews on Friday mornings.

Ben Higgins and Steven Woods (formerly of The Mighty 1090 XEPRS) became KWFN's morning hosts on June 10. John Kentera was moved to early afternoons. Also beginning in 2019, KWFN joined the Navy Football Radio Network.

On December 21, 2023, John Kentera was fired by the station just before the Christmas holiday. He would be replaced in the middays by Annie Helibrunn and Craig Elsten alongside Kentera's former producer, Braden Surprenant.

KWFN continued to expand the local talk radio lineup as Surprenant, along with fellow producer Matt Skraby were added to the station's program lineup. Skraby began hosting an hour-long show on weekday evenings from 6pm until 7pm following "Gwynn & Chris" hosted by Tony Gwynn Jr. and Chris Ello. Surprenant now hosts a Sunday morning talk show from 9am until 11am.

On March 5, 2025, Audacy announced nationwide layoffs of close to 300 on air hosts in a sweeping move after emerging for bankruptcy. The moves affected KWFN as Elsten and Helibrunn were a part of the layoffs, leaving the station without a midday show for the time being. Elsten confirmed his dismissal via a post on his Instagram account, thus Surprenant was moved from Sunday mornings and into the midday time slot.

== Boosters ==
In 2019, Entercom received construction permits for five fill-in boosters to improve KWFN's coverage, to be located near La Jolla, Ramona, San Marcos, Escondido, and Encinitas. These signals are expected to be operational by 2022.

Call sign	Frequency	City of license	FID	ERP (W)	Class	FCC info
KWFN-FM1	97.3 FM	La Jolla, San Diego	203647	67 (H)/200 (V)	D	LMS
KWFN-FM2	97.3 FM	Ramona, California	203667	200 (H)/600 (V)	D	LMS
KWFN-FM3	97.3 FM	San Marcos, California	203665	10 (H)/30 (V)	D	LMS
KWFN-FM4	97.3 FM	Escondido, California	203664	53 (H)/160 (V)	D	LMS
KWFN-FM5	97.3 FM	Encinitas, California	203663	330 (H)/1,000 (V)	D	LMS
