= Kimberly Hunt =

American journalist

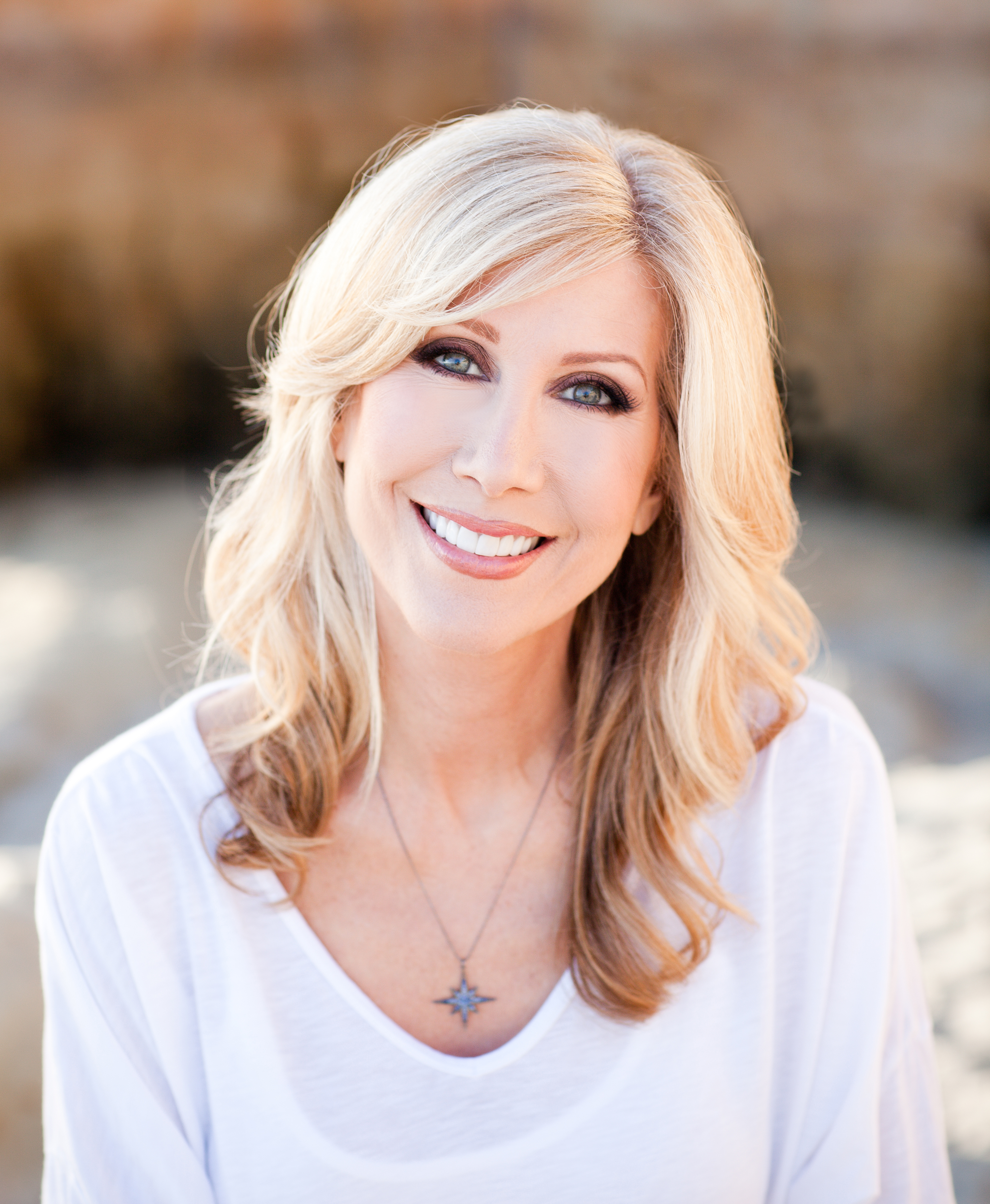
- Kimberly Hunt, News Anchor
- Born: Kimberly Hunt; August 1961 (age 65); Ventura, California, U.S.
- Status: Widowed
- Occupations: News Anchor, Managing Editor
- Notable credit(s): 10 News Evening Anchor (2008–Present) KUSI News Evening Anchor (2002–2007); 10 News Evening Anchor (1987–2002)
- Spouse: Billy Ray Smith m. 1990 d. 2026
- Website: http://www.10news.com/index.html

Kimberly Hunt, an Emmy Award winner, is a San Diego news reporter, chief anchor, and managing editor, for KGTV. During her career, Hunt has interviewed sitting presidents, Oprah Winfrey, and other military, political and business leaders. She has reported live from the Academy Awards, Super Bowl games, political conventions, and other events.

== Early life and education ==
Hunt was born in Ventura, California, and raised in Napa. She graduated from San Francisco State University. During college, she worked as a radio news reporter for KVON/KVYN Radio in Napa.

== Career ==
After graduation, Hunt went to work for ABC Network News as a researcher for Peter Jennings during the 1984 Democratic National Convention in San Francisco. At the close of the convention, she began working as an associate producer for ABC's Monday Night Football.

Hunt began her on-air television career at CBS affiliate KMST (now KION-TV) in Monterey. She relocated to San Diego in 1987 as an anchor for the ABC affiliate KGTV. For fifteen years, Hunt co-anchored the evening newscasts with Carol LeBeau, the longest running female anchor team in the U.S. Hunt joined the KUSI News team in October 2002. For five years, she anchored the 6 p.m., 10 p.m. and 11 p.m. weeknight newscasts. Hunt was also a host of the weekend show San Diego People. In January 2008, Hunt rejoined the 10News team. She currently serves as the chief & primary anchor and managing editor for KGTV, appearing on its 4 p.m., 6 p.m., 7 p.m. and 11 p.m. weeknight newscasts with Steve Atkinson.

Hunt was married to former San Diego Chargers linebacker Billy Ray Smith from 1990 until his death in 2026. Their only child is daughter Savannah Marie Smith.

It was reported on the KGTV news on December 6, 2023 that Hunt suffered a significant orthopedic injury and would miss work for several weeks, but was in good spirits.

== Awards ==
Hunt has been given four regional Emmy Awards for Best Investigative News Story, Best Feature News Story, Best Journalistic Enterprise and Best Evening Newscast. Her contributions to other reports and newscasts have also garnered additional Emmys. In 2011, Hunt won an Edward R. Murrow Award for her story, Tracking the Mexican Mafia - Inside Donovan State Prison. Hunt has earned other industry honors including two first place awards from the San Diego Press Club, for her coverage of Open Air Brothels in San Diego's canyons and her report on Sex Trafficking. She received a Golden Mic Award for a special titled Postcards From Home during the Persian Gulf War, which linked local Marines with their families via videotaped messages. She was also presented with the Attorney General's Crime Prevention Award.

== Community contributions ==
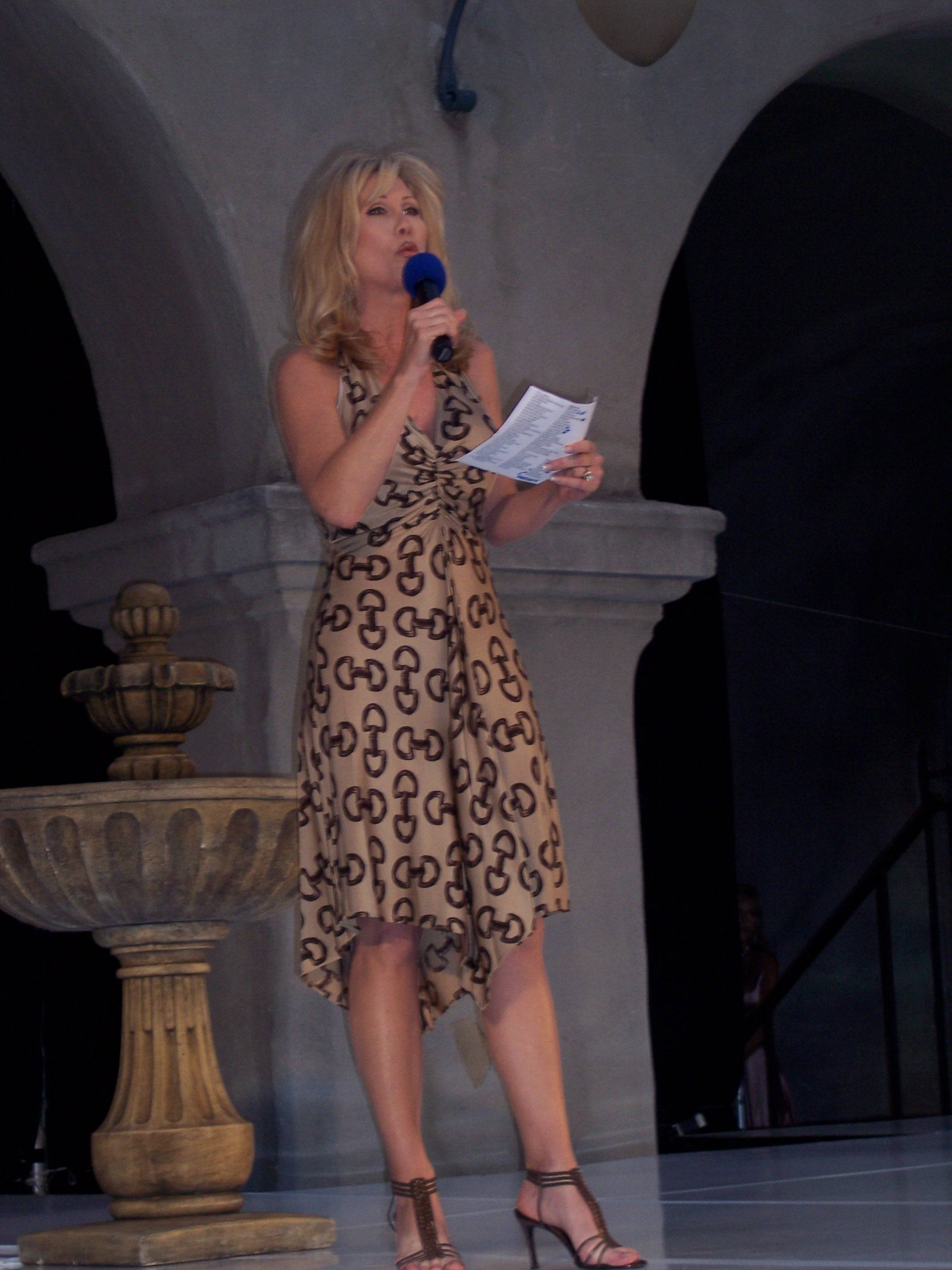
Hunt serves as emcee for Runway in the Park, benefiting Ordinary Miracles. May, 2006

Hunt has volunteered as Mistress of Ceremonies for such organizations as The Cystic Fibrosis Foundation, Dia Del Sol (United Cerebral Palsy), The San Diego Burn Institute, and the annual lighting of the Tree of Life, in support of Mama's Kitchen and the fight against HIV and AIDS. In April 2007, Hunt helped to launch the city's 1st annual Sleepless In San Diego, benefiting The San Diego Rescue Mission.

In March 2011, Hunt was honored by Soroptimist International for her investigative reports exposing the world of sex trafficking. In November 2007, Hunt and husband Billy Ray Smith were given the Legacy Award from Nonprofit Management Solutions for their charitable contributions in San Diego and abroad.

Hunt has emceed San Diego's annual Shop with a Cop, which pairs officers with underprivileged children, to provide them with holiday gifts. Hunt's family has a history of law enforcement service. Her father was a lieutenant with the California Highway Patrol, and her grandfather was a constable with the Ojai Police Department.
