= KSSX =

Urban contemporary radio station in San Diego

- Carlsbad, California; United States
- Broadcast area: San Diego, California
- Frequency: 95.7 MHz (HD Radio)
- Branding: Jam'n 95.7

Programming
- Language: English
- Format: Rhythmic contemporary
- Subchannels: HD2: Black Information Network
- Affiliations: Black Information Network

Ownership
- Owner: iHeartMedia; (iHM Licenses, LLC)
- Sister stations: KGB, KGB-FM, KHTS-FM, KIOZ, KLSD, KMYI, KOGO

History
- First air date: 1965; 61 years ago
- Former call signs: KARL (1965–1979); KKOS (1979–1995); KUPR (1995–1997); KMCG (1997–1998); KMSX (1998–2001); KJQY (2001–2002); KOCL (2002–2004); KUSS (2004–2011); KOGO-FM (2011–2013)
- Former frequencies: 95.9 MHz (1965–1995)
- Call sign meaning: Sounds like "KISS" (former branding)

Technical information
- Licensing authority: FCC
- Facility ID: 67664
- Class: B
- ERP: 30,000 watts
- HAAT: 202 meters (663 ft)

Links
- Public license information: Public file; LMS
- Webcast: Listen live (via iHeartRadio)
- Website: jamn957.iheart.com

KSSX (95.7 FM) is a commercial radio station located in San Diego, California, although the station is legally licensed to serve Carlsbad, in nearby North County. The station airs a rhythmic contemporary format, and is one of seven stations in the market owned and operated by iHeartMedia. The station's studios are located in San Diego's Kearny Mesa neighborhood on the northeast side, and the transmitter is atop Mt. Soledad, located in La Jolla.

== History ==
=== 95.9 FM (1969–1996) ===
Although the station began broadcasting on 95.7 in 1995, it has its origins as a Class A (local) station on 95.9 MHz known as KARL, (a MOR station from 1965 to 1979), then KKOS. During this period the station had various formats, including adult contemporary, CHR, and AAA.

However, an interference problem in Mexico ended up resulting in changes to KKOS. At the time, Califórmula owned a Tijuana station broadcasting on 95.7, XHKY-FM, and was causing interference to KKOS and co-channel KFSH-FM in Anaheim. Ultimately, KKOS and XHKY reached a deal, which was agreed to by the FCC and SCT; on September 15, 1995, XHKY moved to 99.3 at 25,000 watts, KKOS moved to 95.7 at 25,000 watts, and the previous occupant of 99.3, XHATE-FM in Tecate, moved to 95.3 MHz. On the day of the frequency change, KKOS became KUPR, still keeping the AAA format.

=== Country (1996–1997) ===
On November 22, 1996, the station began stunting with country as "Your New Country, 95.7 KUPR".

=== Urban adult contemporary (1997–1998) ===
On March 5, 1997, the station flipped to Urban AC as Magic 95.7 under new callsign KMCG.

=== Hot adult contemporary (1998–2000) ===
The station was sold by Nationwide Communications to Jacor/Citicasters. On September 7, 1998, the "Magic" format would move to XHRM (92.5 FM). After a 15-day period of simulcasting on both frequencies, on September 22, 95.7 flipped to Hot AC as "Mix 95.7" with the callsign changed to KMSX.

=== '80s hits (2000–2001) ===
The format was shifted to all-1980s' hits on November 11, 2000, a day after KBZT adopted the format.

=== Oldies (2001–2004) ===
On November 21, 2001, KMSX swapped frequencies with KJQY and flipped to oldies as "K-Joy 95.7". On January 3, 2002, the station rebranded as "Kool 95.7" (with new callsign KOCL).

=== Country (2004–2011) ===
Logo as New Country 95.7

On January 5, 2004, "Kool" moved to XHHCR-FM 99.3 (rechristened XHOCL-FM), and 95.7 adopted 99.3's country format as US 95.7 (the callsign was then changed to KUSS). The station would rebrand as "New Country 95.7" in September 2008.

=== News/talk (2011–2012) ===
On November 7, 2011, at 7 a.m., after playing "The Dance" by Garth Brooks, 95.7 began simulcasting KOGO as "News/Talk FM 95.7 and AM 600 KOGO". On the 14th, the callsign KUSS was changed to KOGO-FM. Unlike many news/talk stations, the FM addition did nothing to help KOGO's ratings; in fact, they declined after the addition of the simulcast, dropping from a 3.9 in the September 2011 Nielsen ratings (the last prior to the simulcast) to a 3.0 in the October 2012 ratings (the last during the simulcast).

The simulcast with KOGO ended on November 16, 2012, at 7 p.m., when KOGO-FM began stunting with Christmas music as Holiday 95.7 (though it was promoted on-air as simply "95-7 FM"). The KOGO simulcast moved to KMYI's HD2 channel.

=== Rhythmic oldies (2012–2013) ===
Logo as KISS-FM

On December 26, 2012, at 9:57 a.m., after playing "Silent Night" by Josh Groban, the station flipped to rhythmic oldies as "95.7 KISS-FM", with "Kiss" by Prince and "You Should Be Dancing" by the Bee Gees being the first two songs played. In mid-February 2013, the station began including more 1990s, 2000s and recurrent songs, and shifted towards rhythmic adult contemporary. On February 22, KOGO-FM changed their call letters to KSSX. After being jockless for the first three months, the station added Chio (formerly of XHITZ-FM) as their morning show host on April 8, as well as Sean Sarille in evenings (he has since departed from the station), Shelley Wade in middays, Louie Cruz in afternoons and Beto Perez in nights.

=== Rhythmic adult contemporary (2013–2016) ===
On November 16, 2013, KSSX flipped once again to Christmas music, but kept the "KISS-FM" name and "The Rhythm of San Diego" slogan. At Midnight on December 26, the station completely shifted to a rhythmic adult contemporary direction, dropping the pre-1989 songs from their playlist to focus on the 1990s, 2000s and current material, and changed their slogan to "Today's Rhythm and All the Best Throwbacks". Since then, KSSX has shifted towards rhythmic top 40 by incorporating more current hip hop, as XHITZ-FM de-emphasized hip hop in 2013 and began moving towards a more Mainstream Top 40 direction.

On September 16, 2014, Clear Channel spun off its radio and communications division; the spun off entity was renamed iHeartMedia.

=== Rhythmic Contemporary (2016–present) ===
On May 27, 2016, KSSX airstaff announced the station was going to start "Jam'n" for the Memorial Day weekend at 3 p.m. that day. At that time, after playing "Ignition" by R. Kelly, KSSX rebranded as "Jam'n 95.7" under the direction of program director Rob Scorpio. "The Next Episode" by Dr. Dre and "Work" by Rihanna were the first two songs played. Under the new format, KSSX is the second station in San Diego to adopt the Jammin brand (though as Jam'n), which was previously utilized by XHITZ off and on from the 1990s through the 2010s.

=== HD Programming ===
KSSX utilizes two HD subchannels. The HD1 subchannel is the same Rhythmic radio format as its standard FM signal, as required by law. For the longest time, operation of the HD2 subchannel was contracted to the EMF, and like most HD capable urban stations, carried the Air 1 network. On February 1, 2019, operation of the HD2 subchannel passed to the Association For Community Education, which now repeats the programming of KMRO and carries that station's Spanish-language religious programming; in effect, now carrying the Nueva Vida (Spanish for New Life) network, the affiliation moved from AM station KSDO. FM translator 98.5 K253AD relayed the HD2 subchannel, as KSSX already reaches North County, having Carlsbad as its city of license.

In the light of the George Floyd protests, iHeart terminated the agreement with the Association for Community Education in June 2020, and replaced it with news radio. It began airing programming from the Black Information Network later that summer. The relay was dropped on the translator in early 2021, when it began simulcasting KARJ's HD3 subchannel; KSSX-HD2 now simulcasts KFOO, the Inland Empire BIN affiliate.

=== Competition ===
As of 2020, KSSX primarily competes with XHITZ-FM.
