= KFBG (FM) =

Radio station in San Diego

- San Diego, California; United States
- Broadcast area: San Diego, California; Tijuana, Baja California
- Frequency: 100.7 MHz
- Branding: Frontera 100.7

Programming
- Language: Spanish
- Format: Regional Mexican

Ownership
- Owner: Lotus Communications; (Lotus Communications, LLC)

History
- First air date: September 21, 1959
- Former call signs: KFMB-FM (1959–2020)
- Call sign meaning: "Big FM" previous format

Technical information
- Licensing authority: FCC
- Facility ID: 42117
- Class: B
- ERP: 30,000 watts
- HAAT: 189 meters (620 ft)
- Transmitter coordinates: 32.838°N 117.250°W

Links
- Public license information: Public file; LMS
- Webcast: Listen live
- Website: www.fronterafm.com

KFBG (100.7 FM, "Frontera 100.7") is a commercial radio station licensed to San Diego, California, United States, and broadcasts a Regional Mexican format. KFBG is currently owned by Lotus Communications. The station first broadcast in 1959 as KFMB-FM, before changing its call sign to KFBG in 2020.

Originally a jazz station from 1959 to 1960, KFMB-FM was founded by Transcontinent Television Corporation, owner of the KFMB AM and TV stations. Midwest Television bought the KFMB stations in 1964; KFMB-FM would remain under Midwest ownership until 2018. KFMB-FM had a variety of English-language music formats in its history, shifting to beautiful music from 1960 to 1975, top 40 from 1975 to 1994, adult hits from 1994 to 2015, rock from 2015 to 2018, and adult hits again from 2018 to 2024. In 1977, KFMB became the first FM station to be ranked number one in a major market Arbitron survey.

Over five decades of ownership by Midwest Television ended in 2018 when Tegna Inc. bought KFMB-FM. Two more sales followed, to Local Media San Diego in 2020 and Lotus Communications in 2025. Lotus also changed the format from adult hits to regional Mexican.

== History as KFMB-FM ==
=== Jazz (1959–1960) ===
A sister station to existing AM station KFMB (760 AM) under the ownership of Transcontinent Television Corporation, the station signed on as KFMB-FM on 100.7 FM on September 21, 1959, initially with a jazz format. A previous KFMB-FM station signed on in April 1947 and broadcast until 1950 on 101.5 MHz.

=== Beautiful music (1960–1975) ===
By the summer of 1960, KFMB-FM transitioned to beautiful music, which the station described as the "golden sound of refined musical fare". In 1964, Transcontinent sold the KFMB/KFMB-FM/KFMB-TV cluster to Midwest Television, a company controlled by the Meyer family and based in Champaign, Illinois, at the time. In the late 1960s, the format was called "Music only for a woman"; station manager Eddie "Ed" Peters bought the rights to syndicate the format. Soon after, Peters left and started his own jingle company, Peters Productions, which syndicated the format on reel-to-reel tape to over 100 stations during the 1960s and 1970s, changing the name of the format to "Music just for the two of us".

=== Top 40 (1975–1994) ===
Following the trend of FM radio stations taking on top 40 formats in the early 1970s, KFMB program director Bobby Rich and station manager Paul Palmer decided to launch a top 40 station on KFMB-FM to challenge market leader KCBQ (1170 AM). Rich wanted to change the call letters to something with a "Q" in them to become "the FM Q", but the owners refused to break up the KFMB/KFMB-FM/KFMB-TV matched set of call signs. In March 1975, KFMB-FM became "B-100" with the slogan "Better Boogie"; Southern California radio writer Richard Wagoner described the new station as a "high-energy screamer [that] went straight for the jugular". In the fall 1977 Arbitron ratings, KFMB-FM became the first FM station to be no. 1 in a major media market.

B-100's on-air staff during its first two years included "Shotgun" Tom Kelly, Kenny "Beaver Cleaver" Levine, and Bobby Rich under his on air name "Dr. Boogie". Later, some DJs left to launch top 40 outlet KTNQ (Ten-Q) in Los Angeles.

B-100 had major success in the 1980s, reinventing itself as one of the nation's first ever hot adult contemporary (hot AC) stations. It melded top 40 hits (omitting some teen-oriented songs) with an adult delivery by its high-profile air staff. The day started with The B-100 Morning Zoo starring Bobby Rich, Scott Kenyon, Pat Gaffey, and Frank Anthony — collectively known as "The Rich Brothers". Other personalities from this era included Gary Kelley, Gene Knight (who moved on to KXSN), Danny Romero (who eventually landed at KABC-TV in Los Angeles), Ellen K. Thomas, and John Fox.

Jeff and Jer became the new morning drive hosts at B-100 in 1991, but would leave in April 1993 for KKLQ-FM. Replacing them were John Landers and Jools Brandt, followed by Larry Himmel, who had also succeeded "Shotgun" Tom Kelly in mornings on B-100 in 1979. After Jeff and Jer departed, the station's ratings began to decline.

=== Adult hit formats (1994–2015) ===
On May 16, 1994, Midwest Television announced that KFMB-FM would change formats. After the announcement, the station began a 3-week stunt dubbed "The Great Radio Experiment", where the station tested formats such as all-1970s hits, country, all-Elvis, modern rock, "party songs", all-Beatles, an "MTV"-style top 40 format, classic rock, all-Motown, and children's music, each lasting for a day, and allowed listeners to vote for the new format. On June 6 at midnight, KFMB-FM relaunched as "Star 100.7" and retained the hot AC format, though with a more current and upbeat focus than B-100.

Star 100.7 was a personality-oriented station, with an initial air staff made up of Shawn Ireland and Donna Davis in mornings, Kim Morrison in middays, Dave Smiley in afternoons, Dominica in evenings, and China More in overnights. Later on, the station's air staff consisted of Jeff and Jer (who returned in May 1997) in mornings, Anita Rush in middays, XHRM-FM morning hosts Jagger and Kristi in afternoons (after they left for KMYI in 2002, they would be replaced with Gregg Simms, Jen Sewell and Sara Kiani), and Ricky Lopez at nights (who would later be replaced with a repeat of Jeff and Jer dubbed Jeff and Jer Primetime). The station also aired the Bob and Sheri syndicated morning drive show in the early morning hours for a brief period in late 2004 and early 2005 (the show broadcasts from Charlotte, North Carolina in the Eastern Time Zone).

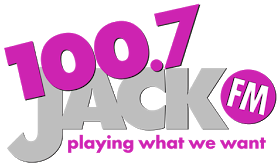
Logo as "100.7 Jack FM"

"Star 100.7" continued until April 6, 2005, at 9:55 a.m., when the station began stunting with a five-minute ticking clock and a mysterious voice saying "closer...closer", which ended with an alarm going off and a female announcer saying "Bye Star". At that point, "Jack FM" and its adult hits format was introduced with R.E.M.'s "It's The End of the World As We Know It (And I Feel Fine)". Jeff and Jer left KFMB-FM in August 2005 for KMYI (94.1 FM).

By one estimate by Karla Peterson and Mark Sauer of the San Diego Union-Tribune, the new Jack FM format had a playlist of nearly 1,200 songs dating to the 1970s, in contrast to Star 100.7 focusing on about 200. On a weekly basis, newer songs were played only 10 percent as often. Peterson and Sauer compared the deeper Jack FM playlist to an iPod's shuffle feature.

Beginning January 23, 2006, KFMB debuted morning show Monique and the Man, co-hosted by comedian Monique Marvez and former Star 100.7 DJs Greg and Sara. The show ended in 2009, and KFMB-FM had no morning show until Dave, Shelly and Chainsaw began on August 2, 2010, having moved from KGB-FM.

On August 2, 2013, KFMB-FM began restricting access to its online stream to listeners within the city of San Diego proper. This move by program director Mike O'Reilly drew the ire of fans who live outside the city limits, including the large U.S. military community stationed locally and overseas. O'Reilly explained his rationale, citing a new Arbitron policy on how online listening is measured:

Our radio industry is continually adapting to changing metrics, which are sometimes out of our control within our competitive landscape. I understand your frustration and I can assure you this decision to restrict our streaming efforts to San Diego was based on multiple factors including the licensing issues outlined on our website. In addition, radio stations that do not 100% simulcast their signals online are essentially competing with themselves. Technically they are considered two separate radio stations in the way they are rated. By restricting our signal to San Diego only, our online stream and our air signal at 100.7FM will be considered one unified station.

— Mike O'Reilly, KFMB-FM program director

KFMB-FM achieved this effect by restricting the signal based on the IP address of the mobile phone on which a listener streamed the station. However, fans within the city of San Diego were prevented from hearing the station as well. In addition, the station charged for access to its local morning radio show on podcast in September 2013.

In January 2014, KFMB-FM evolved from the adult hits format by adding more current and recent hits, dropping most songs recorded before 2000 other than those by established modern rock artists such as Green Day, INXS, and U2. In April 2014, Mediabase added KFMB-FM to its hot AC panel, reflecting its shift from adult hits to a modern rock-leaning hot AC format.

=== Rock (2015–2018) ===
On October 6, 2015, Midwest Television announced that it had entered into a joint operating agreement with Local Media San Diego LLC, which operates three stations licensed to Tijuana but broadcasting in English for the San Diego media market: XETRA-FM (91.1 FM), XHITZ-FM (90.3 FM), and XHRM-FM (92.5 FM). The five stations formed an entity known as SDLocal, which was intended to "preserve the local ownership and operation of San Diego's top-rated radio stations". With the sale, the paywall was lifted off the station's website, allowing the station to be heard outside San Diego once more.

Logo as 100.7 KFM-BFM.

On November 17, 2015, KFMB-FM began airing an all-Christmas music format for the holiday season as "Jack Frost". On December 8, Garrett Michaels, formerly program director at XETRA-FM, was named to the same position at KFMB-FM. With the announcement, there were possible hints of an upcoming format change. While Dave, Shelly and Chainsaw was usually ranked in first place among morning-drive programs, particularly among listeners 25–54 years old, KFMB-FM overall was ranked #17 in the December 2015 Nielsen Audio ratings report for the San Diego market. On December 26, 2015, at 10 a.m., after playing "Merry Christmas (I Don't Want to Fight Tonight)" by the Ramones, KFMB-FM began stunting with a "Wheel of Formats" — consisting of all-AC/DC, all-Bob Marley, all-1980s hits, all-Van Halen, outlaw country, soft adult contemporary, all-glam metal, all-blues, and adult standards — branded simply as "100.7", with each new format starting every day at 10 a.m. The stunt lasted until January 4, when the station settled on a mainstream rock format consisting of a mix of classic rock and 1970s—1980s new wave hits. This was branded as "100.7 KFM-BFM", a nod to how the station referred to its call letters in the 1980s.

Midwest Television and Local Media San Diego ended the SDLocal joint operating agreement at the end of 2016.

On December 18, 2017, Tegna, Inc. announced it would purchase the KFMB stations for $325 million; the deal marked Tegna's re-entry into radio, as predecessor Gannett Company had sold its previous radio group to Evergreen Media in 1997. The sale was completed on February 15, 2018.

The last edition of Dave, Shelly and Chainsaw aired July 19, 2018. The hosts' contracts were set to expire at the end of the month, but KFMB-FM failed to reach new deals with hosts Dave Rickards and Cookie "Chainsaw" Randolph. Shelly Dunn had announced her retirement from radio the previous week.

=== Return to adult hits (2018–2020) ===
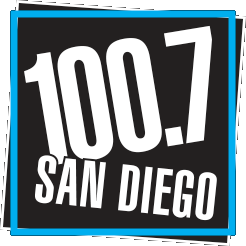
Logo as "100.7 San Diego"

In December 2018, KFMB-FM flipped back to adult hits as "100.7 San Diego". In January 2019, it was announced that Chris Cantore (coming from KBZT) would begin hosting mornings. (Former KFMB studios owner Elisabeth Kimmel was later arrested on March 12, 2019, for her role in the infamous 2019 college admissions scandal, with conspiracy to commit mail fraud and honest services mail fraud to boost her son's college admission credentials for pole vaulting.)

On December 30, 2019, Tegna reached an agreement to sell KFMB and KFMB-FM to Local Media San Diego (LMSD) for $5 million, putting them back under common control with its three Mexican-licensed stations. The deal broke up the KFMB station cluster after 60 years and did not include the rights to the KFMB call letters. Local Media entered into a 10-year lease of the transmitter site on Mount Soledad as part of the sale. On January 28, 2020, ahead of the closure, it was announced that the entire airstaff would be exiting on February 7, 2020, which was when they expected the sale to be closed. However, it was later revealed that their staff would remain in place through at least February 14; regulatory approval of the sale faced delays due to several factors, including the required publication of public notices of the proposal being delayed due to an "inadvertent scheduling oversight". The sale was ultimately approved on March 12, 2020, and was completed on March 17, 2020; while KFMB was immediately divested to iHeartMedia, no immediate changes were disclosed for KFMB-FM, other than a planned relocation to LMSD's Sorrento Valley studios.

== History as KFBG ==
=== "Big FM" adult hits format (2020–2025) ===
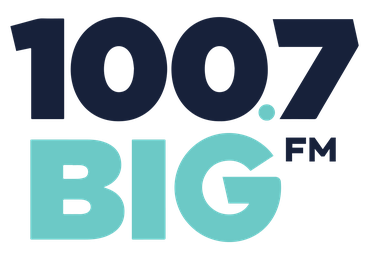
Logo as "Big FM"

On April 6, 2020, the station's call sign was changed to KFBG. On April 13, at noon, the station rebranded as "100.7 Big FM", featuring what it said was "a bigger music library". The studios also relocated to Sorrento Valley. Initially, the station aired without any DJs, but a morning personality was hired in December 2020. In April 2022, the frequency reached #1 in the Nielsen Audio Ratings for the first time since 1988.

=== Regional Mexican (2025) ===
In December 2024, the station was sold by Local Media San Diego to Lotus Communications. The "Big FM" adult hits format ended at 7 p.m. on January 31, 2025, following a half-hour block of departure-themed songs (ending with "Mexican Radio" by Wall of Voodoo - a subtle nod to both its soon-to-be former sister stations that are licensed to Mexico, and to the fact Lotus operates primarily regional Mexican, or otherwise Spanish-language, formatted stations). KFBG then switched to a temporary simulcast of XETRA-FM while awaiting Federal Communications Commission approval for the sale. Its airstaff remained with LMSD. (LMSD also intended to keep the KFBG callsign, specifically mandating in the announcement of the move they wanted to keep it with the sale, which would've forced 100.7 to change callsigns with the move, and would've seemingly hinted at an eventual revival of the "Big" brand on another local frequency. This did not come to pass, and the station still retains the callsign as of 2026 as a result.) Afternoon host Garett Michaels was transferred to XETRA-FM as its new morning host, while morning host Corey Dylan moved to XHITZ-FM as its midday host.

The sale to Lotus closed in late April. On May 1, KFBG flipped to Regional Mexican, branded as "Frontera 100.7." The station will feature the syndicated "Don Cheto Al Aire" in mornings.

== Technical information ==
KFBG broadcasts with 26 kW of effective radiated power. Its transmitter is atop Mount Soledad in La Jolla. KFBG's studios are currently located at Cornerstone Court in Sorrento Valley.
