= XEPRS-AM =

Radio station in Playas de Rosarito, Baja California, Mexico

XEPRS
- Fracc. Rancho del Mar, Playas de Rosarito, Baja California; Mexico
- Broadcast area: San Diego–Tijuana, Los Angeles-Orange County, Riverside-San Bernardino
- Frequency: 1090 kHz
- Branding: La Voz 1090

Programming
- Format: Spanish Christian

Ownership
- Owner: Interamericana de Radio, S.A de C.V.; (Interamericana de Radio, S.A. de C.V.)
- Operator: Ministerios Encuentro y Conexión

History
- First air date: November 6, 1944 (as XERB)
- Former call signs: XERB (1936–1971)
- Call sign meaning: Sounds like "Express" (former branding)

Technical information
- Licensing authority: CRT
- Class: B
- Power: 50,000 watts
- Transmitter coordinates: 32°24′8.2″N 117°5′12.2″W

XEPRS (1090 kHz) is an AM commercial radio station licensed to Playas de Rosarito, a suburb of Tijuana in Baja California, Mexico. It broadcasts a Spanish Christian radio format. The station can be heard across the San Diego–Tijuana, Los Angeles-Orange County, Riverside-San Bernardino and areas of Southern California.

XEPRS is a Class A, 50,000-watt clear-channel station using a non-directional antenna in the daytime. Because it must protect other Class A stations on 1090 AM, it uses a three-tower array directional antenna at night. The transmitter is just off Mexican Federal Highway 1D in Fraccionamiento Rancho del Mar. The daytime signal can be heard over much of coastal Southern California and parts of Baja California. At night, the skywave signal extends over much of the West Coast of the United States and Northwestern Mexico.

== History ==
=== XERB: The Mighty 1090 ===
Today's 1090 AM started out as 150,000-watt XERB on 730 kHz. The original concession was awarded to Manuel P. Barbachano, grandson of one-time Governor of Yucatán, Miguel Barbachano. The concession was sold to Radiodifusora Internacional, S.A., in 1939. As part of the North American Regional Broadcasting Agreement in 1941, the station moved from 730 to 1090, with a power of 50,000 watts. XERB was sold to Interamericana de Radio, S.A., in 1950.

In the early 1960s, Robert Weston Smith (better known as Wolfman Jack) was living in Del Rio, Texas and appearing on the 250,000-watt "border blaster" radio station XERF (1570 AM), just over the Rio Grande in Ciudad Acuña. In 1964, after several violent incidents at XERF's transmitter, Smith and partner Marvin Kosofsky (called "Mo Burton" in Wolfman Jack's autobiography) decided to relocate to an American radio station. They purchased Minneapolis-area daytimer station KUXL 1570. Smith moved to Minnesota and never appeared as Wolfman Jack on KUXL, but rather worked as the station's general manager while shipping Wolfman shows on tape to XERF.

In 1965, Smith made an arrangement with the U.S. agent to program another border blaster, XERB in Tijuana. Smith began selling ad time on the "Mighty 1090" and recording Wolfman Jack shows for his new affiliate. Initially, Smith controlled the station's affairs from Minneapolis, but in 1966, Smith, along with fellow KUXL staffers Ralph Hull (also known as Preacher Paul Anthony and The Nazz) and Art Hoehn (also known as Fat Daddy Washington), relocated to Southern California to run XERB full-time.

Wolfman and his associates were able to make the station turn a large profit by selling 15–30-minute blocks of time to radio proselytizers. The preachers were able to pay for the time by asking their listeners to send them donations. Because they had such a large following and made so much money, the radio evangelists were willing to pay sizable fees for airtime.

In addition to the paid brokered programming, Wolfman began broadcasting his own pre-recorded shows on three different high-powered Mexican stations at different times of the day: XERB, XERF, and XEG in Monterrey, Nuevo León, powered at 100,000 watts. Wolfman courted advertisers who enjoyed his brand of rock and roll music and his howling personality.

According to his biography, by 1971, Wolfman was making a profit of almost $50,000 a month. The Mexican company executives that leased XERB noticed this and got greedy. They wanted to throw him out and make all the money themselves. The owners bribed Mexican officials into politically squeezing Wolfman off the air. The Mexican government acquiesced by passing a law prohibiting Pentecostal and Evangelical religious programming on Mexican airwaves. Since XERB made most of its profits from airtime sold to the prayer-cloth preachers, Wolfman could no longer make payments to the owners each month. "That was it," Wolfman remembered. "In one stroke they cleaned out 80 percent of all the money we were expecting to make." He and Kosofsky had to return control of the station to the Mexican owners.

Some years later, the Mexican government repealed that law and allowed radio preachers back on the air. But, without Wolfman Jack howling over the airwaves, XERB never duplicated the fame he had brought it. The XERB call sign was recycled in 1986 for a radio station in Cozumel, in the state of Quintana Roo with no relation to the old XERB.

=== XEPRS: The Soul Express ===
With Wolfman out of the way, the station owners tried to duplicate his successful formula. They changed the call letters to XEPRS (“The Soul Express”), programmed at night with soul music, mostly for the African-American and Latino neighborhoods around Los Angeles. The Wolfman still broadcast for over a year while under the new ownership, until April 15, 1972. Airchecks of that last show are still available online; tapes of old Wolfman shows could be heard on XEPRS as late as 1980.

In the summer of 1972, George Lucas filmed Wolfman Jack using the studios of station KRE 1400 in Berkeley, California for the film, American Graffiti. (Some artistic license was employed for the movie: Wolfman is shown doing his program live from California, although the Brinkley Act made such broadcasting illegal.)

=== Daytime Spanish, nighttime oldies ===
Through the 1970s, '80s and '90s, XEPRS aired a variety of formats in Spanish in the daytime, while sometimes running English-language programming at night. From 1976 to the early 1980s, Rick Ward and Ron Beaton programmed oldies during the 6 p.m. to 6 a.m. skywave signal. Ron Beaton is now retired in Glendale, California, and Rick Ward is retired, living in Little Rock, Arkansas. Wolfman's old shows were broadcast from 11 p.m. to 1 a.m. on Saturday nights during this period. Early in the 1980s, DJ Sean Green hosted a daily oldies show, from 7 p.m. to midnight, in English, calling it "1090 Express Radio." The show's advertisements, announced by Dick "Huggy Boy" Hugg, were mostly for oldies albums that appealed to the Lowrider culture.

The last Spanish-language format was salsa, merengue and other forms of Tropical music as "Radio Caliente." From 2000 to 2002, XEPRS was the Spanish-language home of the Anaheim Angels, including its championship year of 2002.

=== Sports radio ===
In 2001, another powerful AM station in Tijuana, XETRA (now XEWW), began simulcasting much of the English-language sports programming also heard on KLAC 570 in Los Angeles and a few other AM stations around Southern California, with the moniker "XTRA Sports". Several of the AM 690 hosts and sportscasters were released, including Bill Werndl, John Kentera, and others. That left the San Diego radio market without a local all-sports station. The former head of programming for XTRA Sports, John Lynch, saw the void and formed the Broadcast Company of the Americas, launching a new all-sports station on XEPRS in March 2003. He brought over most of the on-air talent released from 690 XETRA. John Lynch has another involvement in the world of sports; he's the father of the former NFL defensive back, also known as John Lynch. In addition, John Lynch Sr. helped introduce Lee "Hacksaw" Hamilton to San Diego sports radio.

In 2004, XEPRS acquired the rights to become the flagship station of the San Diego Padres. XEPRS was the Padres' home station until 2016, when Entercom won the rights and began broadcasting the games on alternative rock station KBZT.

Beginning February 1, 2006, XEPRS started simulcasting its sports talk programming on sister station XHBCE-FM 105.7, based in Tecate, Baja California. This operation was aimed at improving the station's signal to Eastern San Diego County as well as giving XEPRS listeners the choice of hearing it on FM or AM. The station then became known as "XX (Double X) Sports Radio." News updates were produced by San Diego television station KUSI.

On April 15, 2008, at 9 a.m., XX Sports Radio ended the simulcast on 105.7 MHz. XHBCE-FM became an oldies radio station branded as "105.7 The Walrus." This was the first FM oldies station in San Diego since XHOCL-FM flipped to a Spanish language format on September 1, 2005. As a result of the simulcast's break-up (except for Padres games), XX Sports Radio was renamed "XX 1090."

In 2009, the Padres simulcast was moved to XEPE-AM 1700.

On October 6, 2010, XEPRS became a part-time affiliate of ESPN Radio, simulcasting sister station XEPE overnights and weekends, dropping the Sporting News Radio affiliation XEPRS held since 2008.

The Mighty 1090 former logo used from 2012 to 2015

XEPRS has also carried San Diego Toreros men's basketball, San Diego State Aztecs college football and basketball, and the San Diego Gulls AHL hockey, and has aired a few games for the Anaheim Ducks, the Gulls' parent club. Beginning with the 2018 season, XEPRS carried Los Angeles Rams football games.

=== Return of "The Mighty 1090" ===
On December 17, 2012, the station re-branded as "The Mighty 1090" to coincide with the return of the Scott & BR Show. On January 2, 2013, the station became the San Diego outlet for CBS Sports Radio with a line-up featuring Jim Rome's syndicated show on CBS, plus local San Diego hosts heard mornings and afternoons. In 2014, the station signed Dan Sileo to host its morning drive show.

In April 2018, XEPRS got new competition on the FM dial when Entercom switched KEGY 97.3 to a sports format, branded as "97.3 The Fan." It became the San Diego Padres' flagship station, taking over from co-owned KBZT 94.9. Dan Sileo, who left XEPRS earlier in the year, joined The Fan for a morning drive time show. As a result, XEPRS gave up its affiliation with CBS Sports Radio, since Entercom owns a stake in that network and began carrying its programming on KEGY. On nights and weekends, XEPRS returned to airing ESPN Radio, also heard on co-owned XEPE.

=== Return to Spanish-language programming ===
In December 2018, it was reported that the Bichara family, owners of Interamericana de Radio, as well as stations in Monterrey and McAllen, Texas, was not happy with its relationship with BCA. The Bicharas began looking for a new operator for the station for $100,000 a month in rent, or $11 million to buy the station. At the same time, Jaime Bonilla Valdez's Media Sports de México had halted BCA's program supply to two stations it owned in a rent dispute.

On April 10, 2019, XEPRS replaced BCA's sports format with a simulcast of one of the Bichara family's McAllen stations, KJAV 104.9. The BCA-operated webcast aired ESPN Radio programming for the remainder of the day. The webcast resumed carrying "Mighty 1090"'s local sports shows on April 11.

In several tweets, Andrés Bichara revealed that BCA had not paid its rent for XEPRS in four months and that issues between BCA and the Bicharas had dated back three years. BCA shut down the "Mighty 1090" audio stream on April 29, 2019. XEPE also halted its broadcasts of ESPN Radio, leaving the San Diego-Tijuana market without an ESPN English-language affiliate.

=== "The Mightier 1090" ===
The Mightier 1090 previous logo used from 2020 to 2022

In April 2020, Bill Hagen, owner of an advertising agency in Flagstaff, Arizona, signed a five-year lease with XEPRS owner Interamericana de Radio and announced plans to relaunch the station as "The Mightier 1090" with a mix of talk, sports and lifestyle features.

On August 12, XEPRS begun stunting with a loop of the station's "History of 1090". The loop featured the history of the frequency and some of the station's eras with Wolfman Jack "The Soul Express", and its prior "Mighty 1090" existence, while also taking pot shots at a previous management running it into the ground. The loop also promoted the newly relaunched station as "the first radio station in the cloud, with no studios". The station, operated by SportsGrid, launched at 9 a.m. on August 17. XEPRS carries SportsGrid programming, The Rich Eisen Show, Scott Kaplan, and SportsMap programming.

On January 10, 2022, XEPRS added programming from ESPN Radio, including its live NFL, MLB, and NBA play-by-play broadcasts. XEPRS added The Jim Rome Show to its afternoon lineup on June 2 that year; the show's previous San Diego affiliate, KWFN, dropped it in February.

=== Monte María Radio, Oldies format ===
On August 1, 2024, XEPRS dropped the "Mightier 1090" programming after its lease expired, flipping to Spanish-language Catholic programming from Monte Maria Radio in the interim.

In September 2024, it was reported that the station had begun to air a four-hour block of oldies programming during the afternoon drive time as 1090 AM, split between a live DJ and reruns of Wolfman Jack. Monte Maria Radio continued to air for the remainder of the day. In November 2024, after this soft launch, Marc Paskin officially announced that he would be programming the station. In honor of the station's 85th anniversary, its lineup primarily features syndicated reruns of programming from veteran radio personalities, such as Wolfman Jack, Charlie Tuna, Don Steele's Live From the 60's, and M. G. Kelly, with Paskin himself hosting live hours under the alias "El Chigon". Paskin described the new format as "some of the world’s greatest DJs, playing the world’s greatest oldies", and "radio the way it was meant to be heard". Some parts of the broadcast day are still occupied by Monte Maria Radio programming and the iteration which started on Monday March 3, 2025, was a switch to easy listening rock which has replaced the oldies programming. Not long after, XEPRS reverted to all-Spanish programming, which remains to this day.

== See also ==
- XERF-AM
- XHPRS-FM
- XEPE-AM
