= 1989 Loma Prieta earthquake =

Major earthquake in Northern California

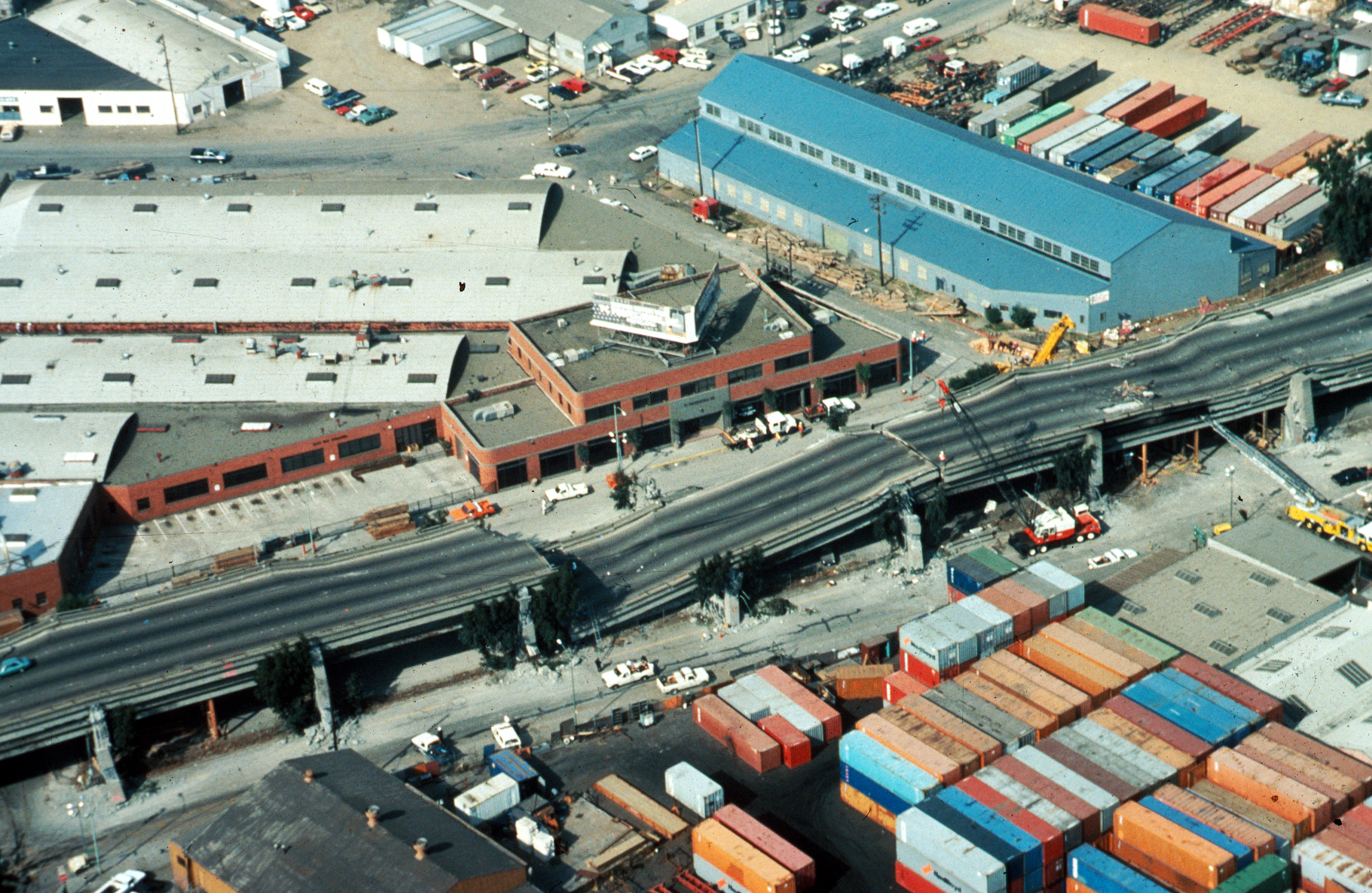
- The collapsed Cypress Street Viaduct in Oakland, California

- UTC time: 1989-10-18 00:04:15
- ISC event: 389808
- USGS-ANSS: ComCat
- Local date: October 17, 1989; 37 years ago
- Local time: 17:04:15 PDT
- Duration: 8–15 seconds
- Magnitude: 6.9 M_{w}, 7.2 M_{S}
- Depth: 19 km (12 mi)
- Epicenter: 37.04°N 121.88°W
- Type: Oblique-slip reverse
- Areas affected: Central Coast (California); San Francisco Bay Area; United States
- Total damage: $5.6–6 billion (equivalent to $14.5–15.6 billion today)
- Max. intensity: MMI IX (Violent)
- Peak acceleration: 0.65 g (at epicenter)
- Tsunami: Yes
- Landslides: 1,000–4,000
- Foreshocks: 5.3 M_{L} June 27, 1988; 5.4 M_{L} August 8, 1989
- Casualties: 63 killed, 3,757 injured

On October 17, 1989, at 5:04 p.m. PDT, the Loma Prieta earthquake occurred on the Central Coast of California. The shock was centered in The Forest of Nisene Marks State Park in Santa Cruz County, approximately 10 miles (16 km) northeast of Santa Cruz on a section of the San Andreas Fault System and was named for the nearby Loma Prieta Peak in the Santa Cruz Mountains. With an M_{w} magnitude of 6.9 and a maximum Modified Mercalli intensity of IX (Violent), the shock was responsible for 63 deaths and 3,757 injuries. The Loma Prieta segment of the San Andreas Fault System had been relatively inactive since the 1906 San Francisco earthquake (to the degree that it was designated a seismic gap) until two moderate foreshocks occurred in June 1988 and again in August 1989.

Damage was heavy in Santa Cruz County and less so to the south in Monterey County, but effects extended well to the north into the San Francisco Bay Area, both on the San Francisco Peninsula and across the bay in Oakland. No surface faulting occurred, though many other ground failures and landslides were present, especially in the Summit area of the Santa Cruz Mountains. Liquefaction was also a significant issue, especially in the heavily damaged Marina District of San Francisco, but its effects were also seen in the East Bay, and near the shore of Monterey Bay, where a non-destructive tsunami was also observed.

Because it happened during a national live broadcast of the 1989 World Series, the annual championship series of Major League Baseball, taking place between Bay Area teams San Francisco Giants and the Oakland Athletics, it is sometimes referred to as the "World Series earthquake", with the championship games of the year being referred to as the "Earthquake Series". Rush-hour traffic on the Bay Area freeways was much lighter than normal because the game, being played at Candlestick Park in San Francisco, was about to begin, and this almost certainly prevented a larger loss of life, as several of the Bay Area's major transportation structures suffered catastrophic failures. The collapse of a section of the double-deck Nimitz Freeway in Oakland was the site of the largest number of casualties for the event, but the collapse of human-made structures and other related accidents contributed to casualties occurring in San Francisco, Los Gatos, and Santa Cruz.

== Background ==
The history of earthquake investigations in California has been largely focused on the San Andreas Fault system because of its strong influence in the state as the boundary between the Pacific plate and the North American plate; it is the most studied fault on Earth. Andrew Lawson, a geologist from the University of California, Berkeley, had named the fault after the San Andreas Lake (prior to the occurrence of the 1906 San Francisco earthquake) and later led an investigation into that event. The San Andreas Fault ruptured for a length of 290 mi (470 km) during the 1906 shock, both to the north of San Francisco and to the south in the Santa Cruz Mountains region. Several long term forecasts for a large shock along the San Andreas Fault in that area had been made public prior to 1989 (the event and its aftershocks occurred within a recognized seismic gap) but the earthquake that transpired was not what had been anticipated. The 1989 Loma Prieta event originated on an undiscovered oblique-slip reverse fault that is located adjacent to the San Andreas Fault.

=== Forecasts ===
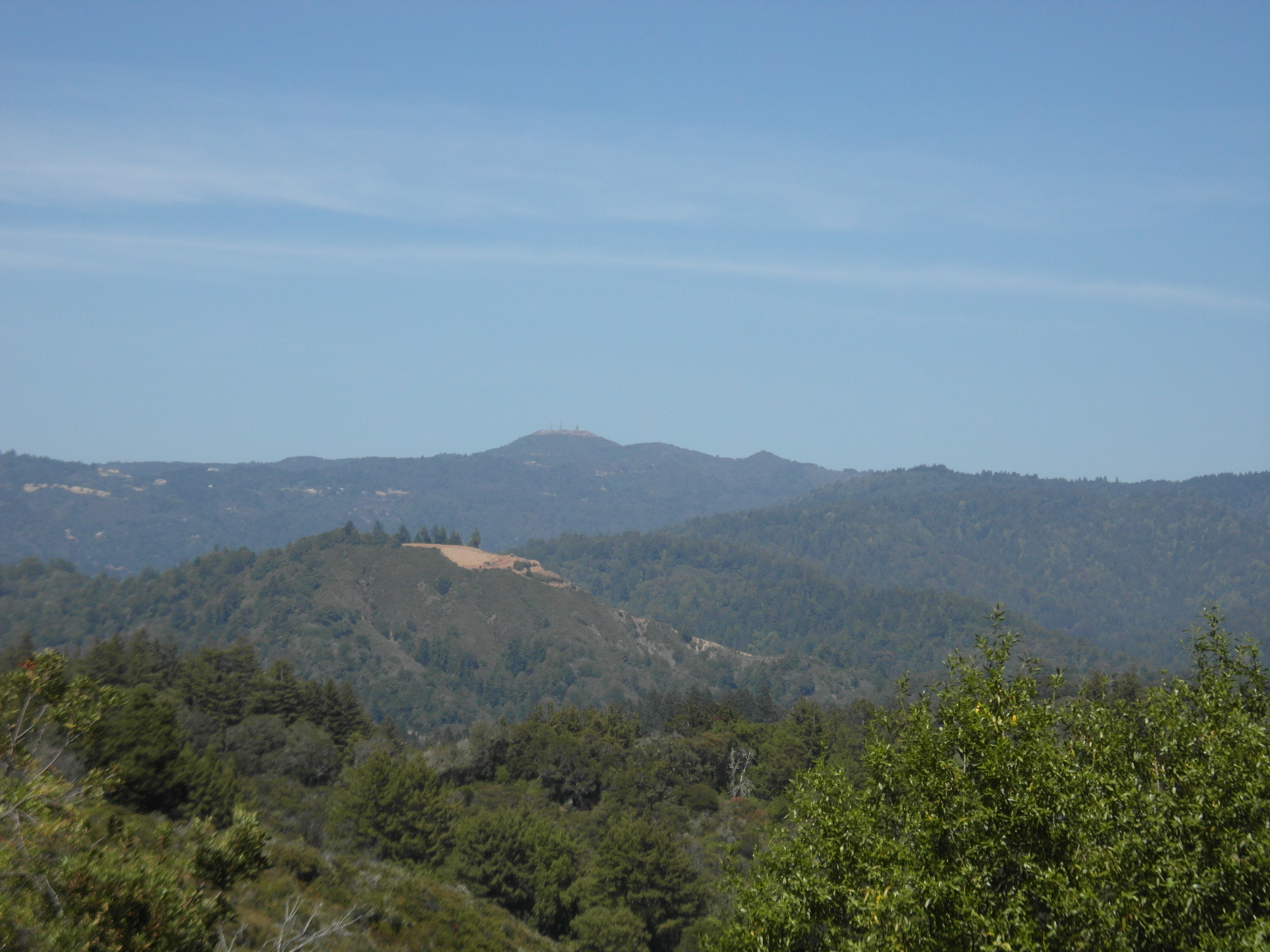
Loma Prieta Peak in the Santa Cruz Mountains

Since many forecasts had been presented for the region near Loma Prieta, seismologists were not taken by surprise by the October 1989 event. Between 1910 and 1989 there were 20 widely varying forecasts that were announced, with some that were highly specific, covering multiple aspects of an event, while others were less complete and vague. With a M6.5 event on the San Juan Bautista segment, or an M7 event on the San Francisco Peninsula segment, United States Geological Survey (USGS) seismologist Allan Lindh's 1983 forecasted rupture length of 25 miles (40 km) (starting near Pajaro Gap, and continuing to the northwest) for the San Juan Bautista segment nearly matched the actual rupture length of the 1989 event. An updated forecast was presented in 1988, at which time Lindh took the opportunity to assign a new name to the San Juan Bautista segment – the Loma Prieta segment.

In early 1988, the Working Group for California Earthquake Probabilities (WGCEP) made several statements regarding their forecasts for the 225 mi (360 km) northern San Andreas Fault segment, the 56 mi (90 km) San Francisco Peninsula segment, and a 18.8–22 mi (30–35 km) portion of that segment which was referred to as the southern Santa Cruz Mountains segment. The thirty year probability for one or more M7 earthquakes in the study area was given as 50%, but because of a lack of information and low confidence, a 30% probability was assigned to the Southern Santa Cruz Mountains segment. Two moderate shocks, referred to as the Lake Elsman earthquakes by the USGS, occurred in the Santa Cruz Mountains region in June 1988 and again in August 1989. Following each event, the State office of Emergency Services issued (for the first time in Bay Area history) short term advisories for a possible large earthquake, which meant there was "a slightly increased likelihood of an M6.5 event on the Santa Cruz Mountains segment of the San Andreas fault". The advisories following the two Lake Elsman events were issued in part because of the statements made by WGCEP and because they were two of the three largest shocks to occur along the 1906 earthquake's rupture zone since 1914.

=== Foreshocks ===
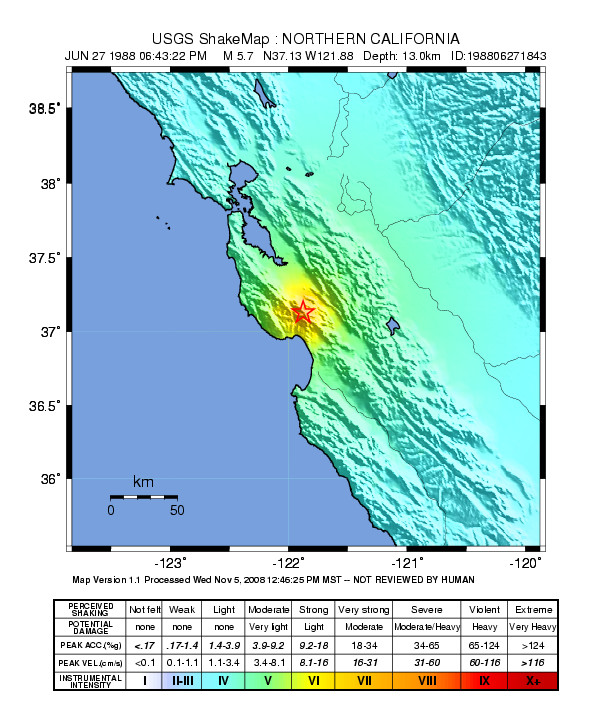
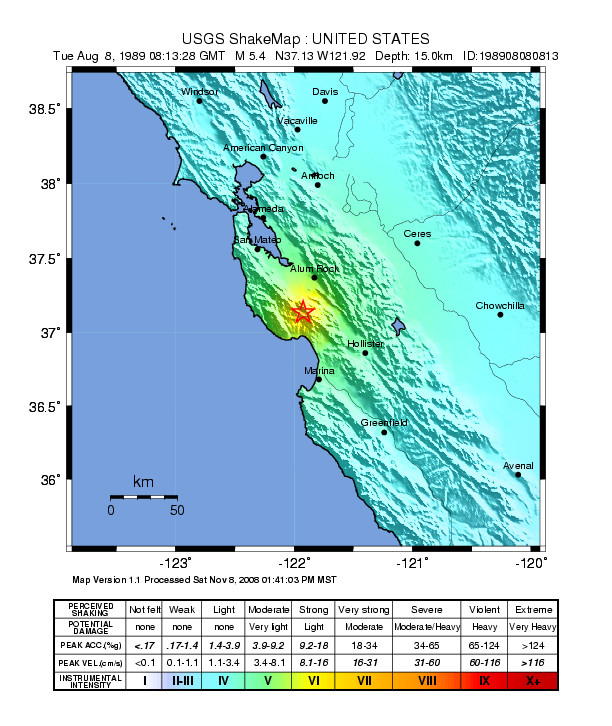
USGS ShakeMaps showing similar intensity patterns for the June 1988 (left) and August 1989 events near Lake Elsman in the Santa Cruz Mountains

The M_{L} 5.3 June 1988 and the M_{L} 5.4 August 1989 events also occurred on previously unknown oblique reverse faults and were within 3 mi (4.8 km) of the M6.9 Loma Prieta mainshock epicenter, near the intersection of the San Andreas and Sargent faults. Total displacement for these shocks was relatively small (approximately 4 in (100 mm) of strike-slip and substantially less reverse-slip) and although they occurred on separate faults and well before the mainshock, a group of seismologists considered these to be foreshocks because of when and where they occurred relative to the main event. Each event's aftershock sequence and effect on stress drop was closely examined, and their study indicated that the shocks affected the mainshock's rupture process. Following the August 8, 1989, shock, in anticipation of an upcoming large earthquake, staff at the University of California, Santa Cruz deployed four accelerometers in the area, which were positioned at the UCSC campus, two residences in Santa Cruz, and a home in Los Gatos. Unlike other nearby (high gain) seismographs that were overwhelmed (driven off scale) by the large magnitude mainshock, the four accelerometers captured a useful record of the main event and more than half an hour of the early aftershock activity.

The June 27, 1988, shock occurred with a maximum intensity of VI (Strong). Its effects included broken windows in Los Gatos, and other light damage in Holy City, where increased flow was observed at a water well. Farther away from the Santa Cruz Mountains, pieces of concrete fell from a parking structure at the Sunnyvale Town Center, a two-level shopping mall in Santa Clara County. More moderate damage resulted from the August 8, 1989, shock (intensity VII, Very strong) when chimneys were toppled in Cupertino, Los Gatos, and Redwood Estates. Other damage included cracked walls and foundations and broken underground pipes. At the office of the Los Gatos City Manager, a window that was cracked had also been broken in the earlier shock. Also in Los Gatos, one man died when he fell or jumped through a window and impacted the ground five stories below.

== Earthquake ==
Ground shaking animation

The Loma Prieta earthquake was named for Loma Prieta Peak in the Santa Cruz Mountains, which lies just to the east of the mainshock epicenter. The duration of the heaviest shaking in the Santa Cruz Mountains was about 15 seconds, but strong ground motion recordings revealed that the duration of shaking was not uniform throughout the affected area (because of different types and thicknesses of soil). At sites with rocky terrain, the duration was shorter and the shaking was much less intense, and at locations with unconsolidated soil (like the Marina District in San Francisco or the Cypress Street Viaduct in Oakland) the intensity of the shaking was more severe and lasted longer. The strong motion records also allowed for the causative fault to be determined – the rupture was related to the San Andreas Fault System.

While a Mercalli Intensity of VIII (Severe) covered a large swath of territory relatively close to the epicenter (including the cities of Los Gatos, Santa Cruz, and Watsonville) farther to the north, portions of San Francisco were assessed at intensity IX (Violent). At more than 44 miles (70 km) distant, the San Francisco Bay Area recorded peak horizontal accelerations that were as high as 0.26 g, and close to the epicenter they peaked at more than 0.6 g. In a general way, the location of aftershocks of the event delineated the extent of the faulting, which (according to seismologist Bruce Bolt) extended about 24 miles (40 km) in length. Because the rupture took place bilaterally, the duration of strong shaking was about half of what it would have been had it ruptured in one direction only. The duration of a typical M6.9 shock with a comparable rupture length would have been about twice as long.

=== Characteristics ===
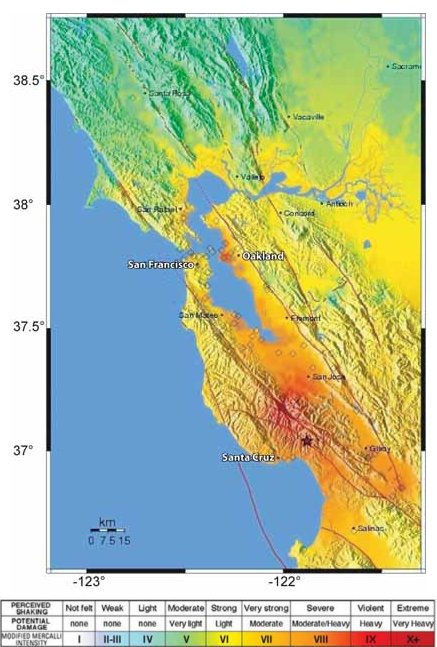
USGS ShakeMap showing the intensity of the mainshock

Gregory Beroza, a seismologist with Stanford University, made several distinctions regarding the 1906 and 1989 events. Near Loma Prieta, the 1906 rupture was more shallow, had more strike-slip, and occurred on a fault that was near vertical. The 1989 event's oblique-slip rupture was at 10 km and below on a fault plane that dipped 70° to the southwest. Because much of the slip in 1989 occurred at depth and the rupture propagated up dip, Beroza proposed that the overlying San Andreas Fault actually inhibited further rupture and also maintains that the occurrence of an event at the location that was forecast by the WGCEP in 1988 was coincidental.

The contrasting characteristics of the 1906 and 1989 events were examined by seismologists Hiroo Kanamori and Kenji Satake. The significant amount of vertical displacement in 1989 was a key aspect to consider because a long-term sequence of 1989-type events (with an 80–100-year recurrence interval) normally result in regions with high topographic relief, which is not seen in the Santa Cruz Mountains. Three scenarios were presented that might explain this disparity. The first is that the geometry of the San Andreas Fault goes through a transition every several thousand years. Secondly, slip type could vary from event to event. And lastly, the 1989 event did not occur on the San Andreas Fault.

=== Ground effects ===
While the effects of a four-year drought limited the potential of landslides, the steep terrain near the epicenter was prone to movement, and up to 4,000 landslides may have occurred during the event. The majority of landslides occurred to the southwest of the epicenter, especially along road cuts in the Santa Cruz Mountains and in the Summit Road area, but also along the bluffs of the Pacific Coast, and as far north as the Marin Peninsula. Highway 17 was blocked for several weeks by a large slide and one person was killed by a rockfall along the coast. Other areas with certain soil conditions were susceptible to site amplification due to the effects of liquefaction, especially near the shore of San Francisco Bay (where its effects were severe in the Marina District) and to the west of the epicenter near rivers and other bodies of water. Minor lateral spreading was also seen along the shores of San Francisco Bay and to the south near Monterey Bay. Other ground effects included downslope movement, slumps, and ground cracks.

=== Injuries and fatalities ===
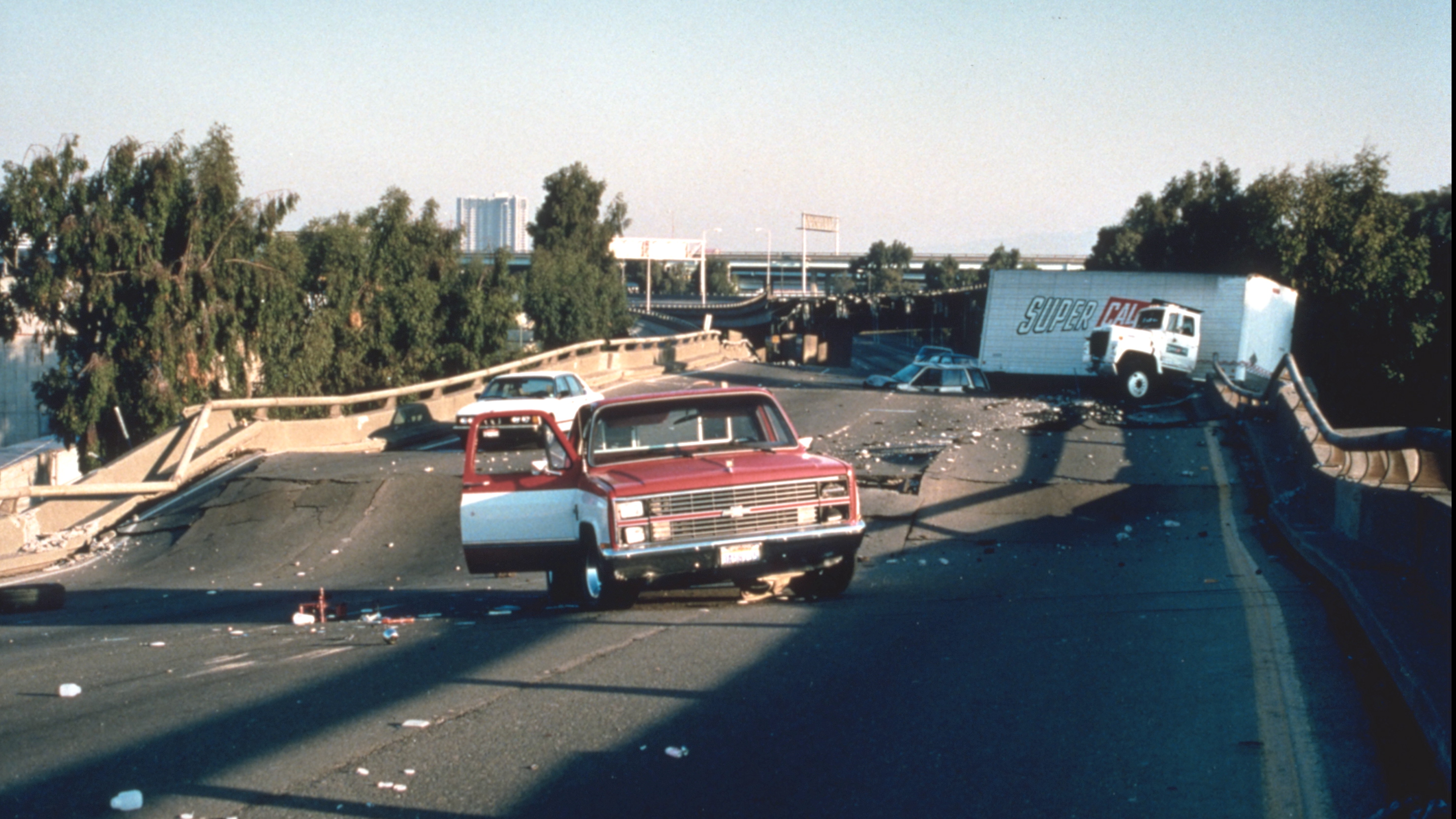
Collapse of the top deck of the Nimitz Freeway onto the bottom deck, and resulting crashes

Fifty-seven of the deaths were directly caused by the earthquake; six further fatalities were ruled to have been caused indirectly. In addition, there were 3,757 injuries as a result of the earthquake, 400 of which were serious. The highest number of deaths, 42, occurred in Oakland because of the collapse of the Cypress Street Viaduct on the Nimitz Freeway (Interstate 880), where the upper level of a double-deck portion of the freeway collapsed, crushing the cars on the lower level, and causing crashes on the upper level. One 50-foot (15 m) section of the San Francisco–Oakland Bay Bridge also collapsed, leading to a single fatality, Anamafi Moala, a 23-year-old woman. Three people were killed in the collapse of buildings along the Pacific Garden Mall in Santa Cruz, and five people were killed in the collapse of a brick wall on Bluxome Street in San Francisco.

When the earthquake hit, the third game of the 1989 World Series baseball championship was about to begin. Because of the unusual circumstance that both of the World Series teams (the San Francisco Giants and Oakland Athletics) were based in the affected area, many people had left work early or were staying late to participate in after work group viewings and parties. As a consequence the normally crowded freeways contained unusually light traffic. If traffic had been normal for a Tuesday rush hour, injuries and deaths would certainly have been higher. The initial media reports failed to take into account the game's effect on traffic and initially estimated the death toll at 300, a number that was corrected to 63 in the days after the earthquake.

== Damage ==
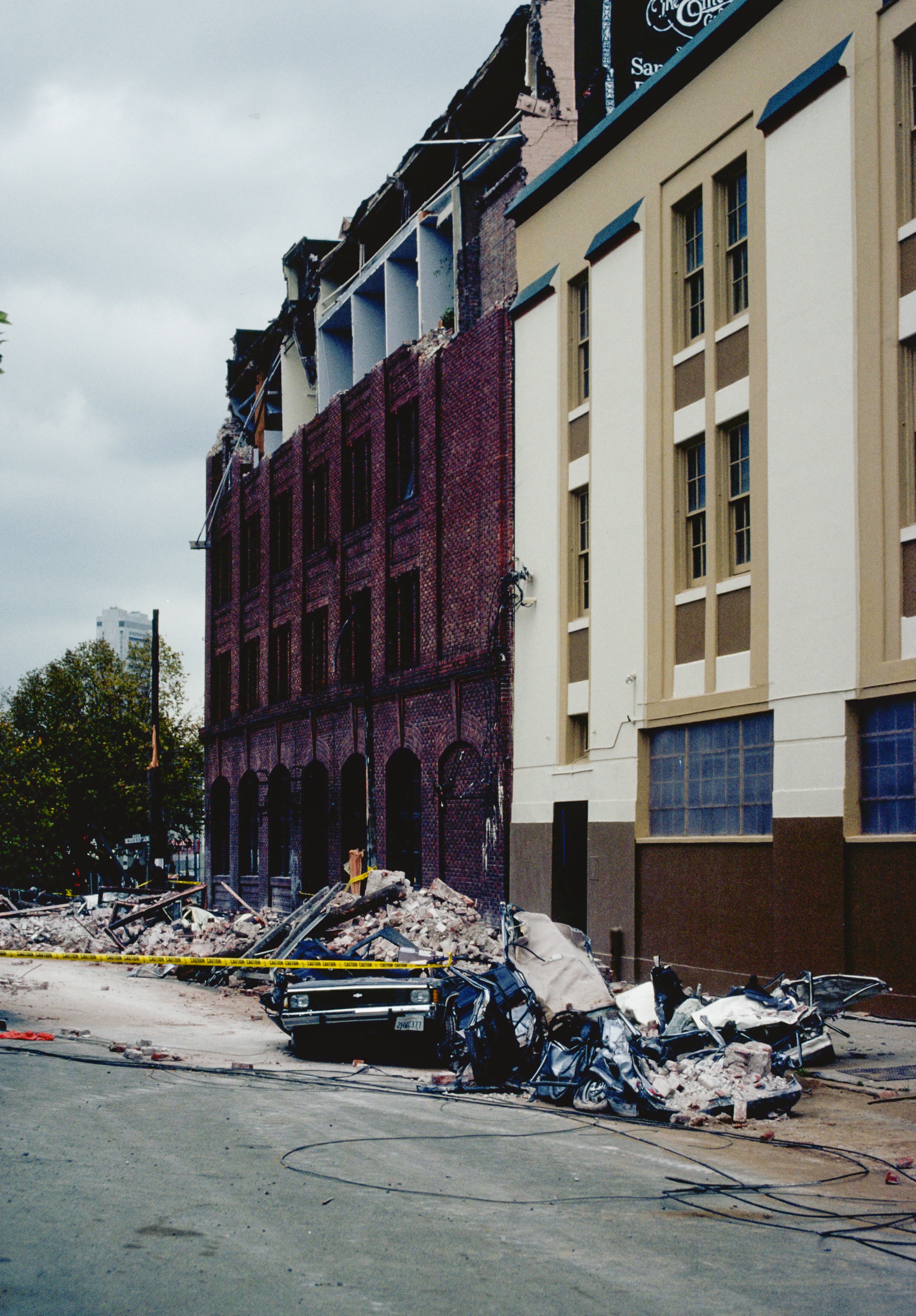
Five people were killed on Sixth Street between Bluxome and Townsend in San Francisco as a brick facade collapsed onto the sidewalk and street.

The earthquake caused severe damage in some very specific locations in the Bay Area, most notably on unstable soil in San Francisco and Oakland. Oakland City Hall was evacuated after the earthquake until a US$80 million (equivalent to US$208 million today) seismic retrofit and hazard abatement work was completed in 1995. Many other communities sustained severe damage throughout the region located in Alameda, San Mateo, Santa Clara, San Benito, Santa Cruz and Monterey counties. Major property damage in San Francisco's Marina District 60 mi (97 km) from the epicenter resulted from liquefaction of soil used to create waterfront land. Other effects included sand volcanoes, landslides and ground ruptures. Some 12,000 homes and 2,600 businesses were damaged. The Federal Emergency Management Agency (FEMA) turned people who were homeless prior to the earthquake away from homeless shelters and provided shelter for those with homes prior to the earthquake.

In Santa Cruz, close to the epicenter, 40 buildings collapsed, killing six people. At the Santa Cruz Beach Boardwalk, the Plunge Building was significantly damaged. Liquefaction also caused damage in the Watsonville area. For example, sand volcanoes formed in a field near Pajaro as well as in a strawberry field. The Ford's department store in Watsonville experienced significant damage, including a crack down the front of the building. Many homes were dislodged if they were not bolted to their foundations. There were structural failures of twin bridges across Struve Slough near Watsonville. In Moss Landing, the liquefaction destroyed the causeway that carried the Moss Beach access road across a tidewater basin, damaged the approach and abutment of the bridge linking Moss Landing spit to the mainland and cracked the paved road on Paul's Island. In the Old Town historical district of the city of Salinas, unreinforced masonry buildings were partially destroyed.

Following the quake, an estimated 1.4 million people experienced power losses that were mainly due to damaged electrical substations. Many San Francisco radio and television stations were temporarily knocked off the air. KGO-TV, the local ABC station in San Francisco, was off the air for about 15 minutes, while KRON-TV (at the time the region's NBC affiliate) was off the air for about half an hour, and KGO-AM (ABC News Radio) was off the air for about 40 minutes. About an hour and 40 minutes after the quake, Fox affiliate KTVU resumed broadcasting, with their news anchors, Dennis Richmond and Elaine Corral reporting from the station's parking lot. KCBS-AM (CBS News Radio) switched immediately to backup power and managed to stay on air despite a subsequent generator failure. KCBS later won a Peabody Award for their news coverage, as did KGO-TV.

KNBR-AM (the designated station for the Bay Area's Emergency Broadcast System at the time) failed to communicate a catastrophe with the activation and instructions of the Emergency Broadcast System to the public after the quake because the engineering department at KNBR experienced major technical malfunctions and difficulties. The malfunctions during the aftermath of the earthquake caused confusion as to whether an earthquake would cause the Emergency Broadcast System to activate. KNBR began using an emergency generator, hooking up the signal from a command center right after their nearby studio was severely shaken during the quake, when most of the KNBR staff were at Candlestick for the World Series. The Mayor of San Francisco, Art Agnos, later came on the air and provided an update on the earthquake.

All four network-affiliated TV stations (KRON, KGO, KTVU and CBS affiliate KPIX) would recover enough to broadcast continuous breaking news coverage of the aftermath of the quake for the next several hours, some of it picked up and broadcast nationally over their respective networks, as well as on CNN, in a manner anticipating later major catastrophes such as the 1994 Los Angeles earthquake and the 9/11 terror attacks.

Power was restored to most of San Francisco by midnight, and all but 12,000 customers had their power restored within two days.

The quake caused an estimated $6 billion (equivalent to $16 billion today) in property damage, becoming one of the most expensive natural disasters in U.S. history at the time. Private donations poured into aid relief efforts and on October 26, President George H. W. Bush signed a $1.1 billion ($2.9 billion today) earthquake relief package for California.

=== Marina District ===
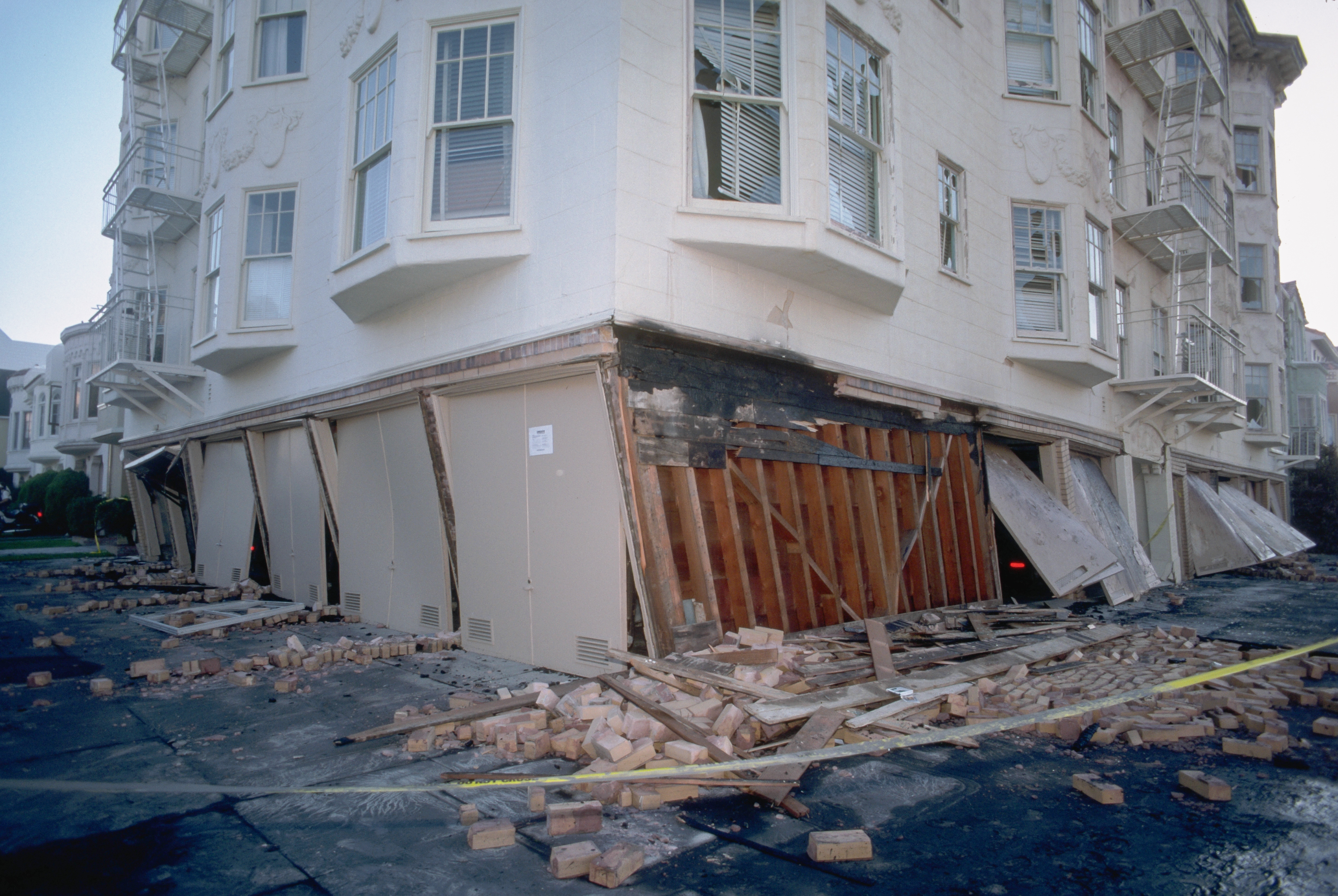
A building in the Marina District at Beach and Divisadero settled onto its failed garage supports

Four people died in San Francisco's Marina District, four buildings were destroyed by fire, and seven buildings collapsed. Another 63 damaged structures were judged too dangerous to live in. Among the four deaths, one family lost their infant son who choked on dust while trapped for an hour inside their collapsed apartment.

The Marina district was built on a landfill made of a mixture of sand, dirt, rubble, waste, and other materials containing a high percentage of groundwater. Some of the fill was rubble dumped into San Francisco Bay after the 1906 San Francisco earthquake, but most was sand and debris laid down in preparation for the 1915 Panama-Pacific International Exposition, a celebration of San Francisco's ability to rebound after its catastrophe in 1906. After the Exposition, apartment buildings were erected on the landfill. In the 1989 earthquake, the water-saturated unconsolidated mud, sand, and rubble suffered liquefaction, and the earthquake's vertical shock waves rippled the ground more severely.

At the intersection of Beach and Divisadero Streets in San Francisco, a natural gas main rupture caused a major structure fire. The San Francisco Fire Department selected civilians to help run fire hoses from a distance because the nearby hydrant system failed. Since the bay was only two blocks from the burning buildings, water from the bay was pumped by the fireboat Phoenix, to engines on the shore, and from there sprayed on the fire. The apartment structures that collapsed were older buildings that included ground-floor garages, which engineers refer to as a soft story building.

=== Santa Cruz and Monterey counties ===
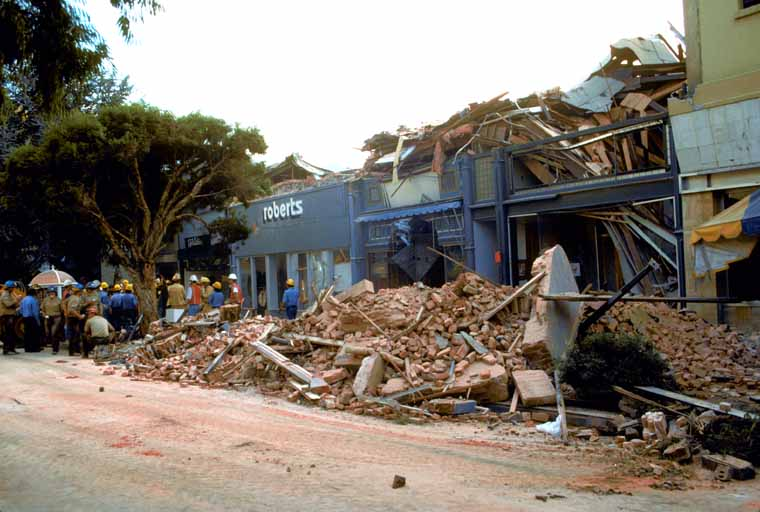
Santa Cruz's historic Pacific Garden Mall suffered severe damage – three died.

In Santa Cruz, the Pacific Garden Mall was severely damaged, with falling debris killing three people, half of the six earthquake deaths in Santa Cruz and Monterey Counties. Some 31 buildings were damaged enough to warrant demolition, seven of which had been listed in the Santa Cruz Historic Building Survey. The four oldest were built in 1894, the five oldest withstood the 1906 San Francisco earthquake.

Immediately, a number of civilians began to free victims from the rubble of Ford's Department Store and the Santa Cruz Coffee Roasting Company – both buildings had collapsed inward on customers and employees alike. Two police officers crawled through voids in the debris, found one victim alive and another dead inside the coffee house. Santa Cruz beach lifeguards assisted in moving the victims. Police dogs were brought in to help locate other victims. A woman was found dead inside Ford's. The civilians who were helpful initially, were soon viewed by police and fire officials as a hindrance to operations, with frantic coworkers and friends of a coffee house employee thought to be trapped under the rubble continuing their efforts in the dark. Police arrested those who refused to stop searching. This became a political issue in the following days. The body of a young woman coffee worker was found under a collapsed wall late the next day.

During the first few days following the quake, electric power to most Santa Cruz County subscribers was out, and some areas had no water. Limited phone service remained online, providing a crucial link to rescue workers. Widespread search operations were organized to find possible victims inside the remains of fallen structures. As many as six teams of dogs and their handlers were at work identifying the large number of damaged buildings that held no victims.

The quake claimed one life in Watsonville: a driver who collided with panicked horses after they escaped their collapsed corral. In other Santa Cruz and Monterey county locations such as Boulder Creek and Moss Landing, a number of structures were damaged, with some knocked off of their foundations. Many residents slept outside their homes out of concern for further damage from aftershocks, of which there were 51 with magnitudes greater than 3.0 in the following 24 hours, and 16 more the second day. The earthquake damaged several historic buildings in the Old Town district of Salinas, and some were later demolished.

Damage to the Salinas River rail bridge and subsequent repairs led to reduced traffic on the Monterey Branch Line, which contributed to the discontinuance of freight rail services in western Monterey County.

=== San Francisco–Oakland Bay Bridge ===
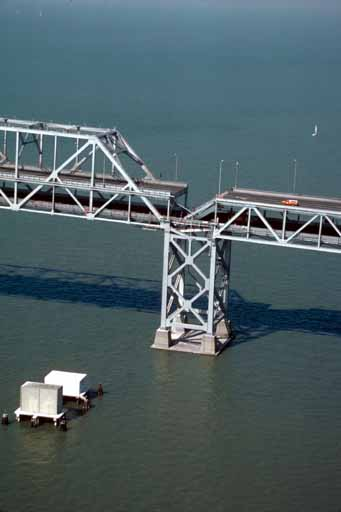
Collapsed upper deck section of the San Francisco–Oakland Bay Bridge – one person died

The San Francisco–Oakland Bay Bridge suffered severe damage, as a 76-by-50-foot (23 m × 15 m) section of the upper deck on the eastern cantilever side fell onto the deck below. The quake caused the Oakland side of the bridge to shift 7 in (18 cm) to the east, and caused the bolts of one section to shear off, sending the 250-short-ton (230 t; 500,000 lb; 226,800 kg) section of roadbed crashing down like a trapdoor. Traffic on both decks came to a halt, blocked by the section of the roadbed. Police began unsnarling the traffic jam, telling drivers to turn their cars around and drive back the way they had come. Eastbound drivers stuck on the lower deck between the collapse and Yerba Buena Island were routed up to the upper deck and westward back to San Francisco. A miscommunication made by emergency workers at Yerba Buena Island routed some drivers the wrong way; they were directed to the upper deck where they drove eastward toward the collapse site. One of these drivers did not see the open gap in time; the 1980 Mercury Zephyr plunged over the edge and smashed onto the collapsed roadbed. The driver, Anamafi Moala, died, and the passenger, her brother, was seriously injured. The family sued the state for their role in Moala's death. Caltrans removed and replaced the collapsed section, and re-opened the bridge on November 18.

To assist with transportation during Bay Bridge repairs, Bay Area Rapid Transit ran 24-hour service in the Transbay Tube between the date of the earthquake and December 3 that same year.

=== Oakland and Interstate 880/Cypress Viaduct ===
The worst disaster of the earthquake was the collapse of the double-deck Cypress Street Viaduct of Interstate 880 in West Oakland. The failure of a 1.25-mile (2.0 km) section of the viaduct, also known as the "Cypress Structure" and the "Cypress Freeway", killed 42 and injured many more.

Built in the late 1950s and opened to traffic in 1957 (as SR 17), the Cypress Street Viaduct, a stretch of Interstate 880, was a double-deck freeway section made of nonductile reinforced concrete that was constructed above and astride Cypress Street in Oakland. Roughly half of the land the Cypress Viaduct was built on was filled marshland and the other half somewhat more stable alluvium. Because of new highway structure design guidelines – the requirement of ductile construction elements – instituted following the 1971 San Fernando earthquake, a limited degree of earthquake reinforcement was retrofitted to the Cypress Viaduct in 1977. The added elements were longitudinal restraints at transverse expansion joints in the box girder spans, but no studies were made of possible failure modes specific to the Cypress Viaduct. Caltrans has since received widespread backlash for not thoroughly studying the structure. When the earthquake hit, the shaking was amplified on the former marshland, and soil liquefaction occurred.

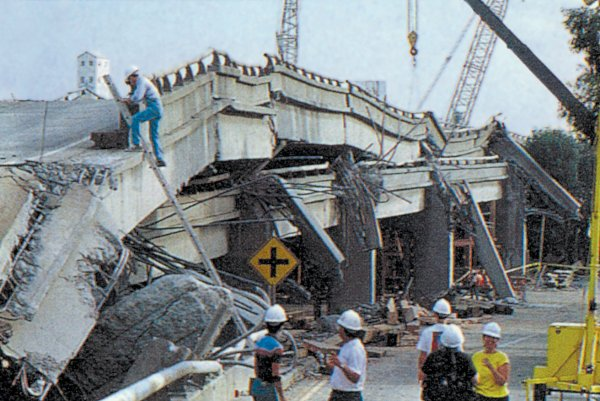
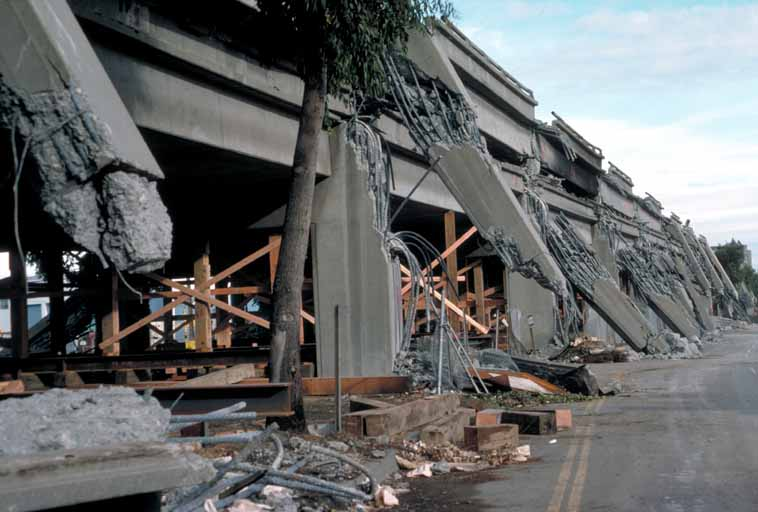
The Cypress Street Viaduct's collapsed upper deck and failed support columns – 42 people died

When the earthquake struck, the freeway buckled and twisted before the support columns failed and the upper deck fell on the lower deck. Forty-two people were crushed to death in their cars. Cars on the upper deck were tossed around violently, some of them flipped sideways, and some were left dangling at the edge of the freeway. Nearby residents and factory workers came to the rescue, climbing onto the wreckage with ladders and forklifts and pulling trapped people out of their cars from under a four-foot gap in some sections. 60 members of Oakland's Public Works Agency left the nearby city yard and joined rescue efforts. Employees from Pacific Pipe drove heavy lift equipment to the scene and started using it to raise sections of fallen freeway enough to allow further rescue. Local workers continued their volunteer operation nonstop until October 21, 1989, when they were forced to pause as U.S. President George H. W. Bush and California Governor George Deukmejian viewed the damage. That same day, survivor Buck Helm was freed from the wreckage, having spent 90 hours trapped in his car. Dubbed "Lucky Buck" by the local radio, Helm lived for another 29 days on life support, but then died of respiratory failure at the age of 58.

Although the freeway reopened in stages between 1997 and 1999, it was not fully rebuilt until 2001 so that it would comply with safety and reinforcement standards. In the meantime, traffic was detoured through nearby Interstate 980, causing increased congestion. Instead of rebuilding Interstate 880 over the same ground, Caltrans rerouted the freeway farther west around the outskirts of West Oakland to provide better access to the Port of Oakland and the San Francisco–Oakland Bay Bridge, and to meet community desires to keep the freeway from cutting through residential areas (at the time the original viaduct was constructed, West Oakland was predominantly occupied by African- and Hispanic-Americans). Street-level Mandela Parkway now occupies the previous roadbed of the Cypress structure.

=== Effects on transportation ===
Aftershocks
Mag	Date (UTC)	Year
4.3 M_{L}	Oct 18 at 00:38	1989
5.2 M_{L}	Oct 18 at 00:41	1989
4.0 M_{L}	Oct 18 at 02:26	1989
4.1 M_{L}	Oct 18 at 03:30	1989
4.2 M_{L}	Oct 18 at 04:50	1989
4.2 M_{L}	Oct 18 at 05:18	1989
4.3 M_{L}	Oct 18 at 10:22	1989
4.3 M_{L}	Oct 19 at 9:53	1989
4.2 M_{L}	Oct 21 at 10:22	1989
4.7 M_{L}	Oct 21 at 22:14	1989
4.3 M_{L}	Nov 2 at 05:50	1989
4.3 M_{L}	Apr 18 at 13:37	1990
4.5 M_{L}	Apr 18 at 13:41	1990
5.4 M_{L}	Apr 18 at 13:53	1990
4.2 M_{L}	Apr 18 at 14:52	1990
4.2 M_{L}	Apr 18 at 15:28	1990
4.5 M_{L}	Mar 24 at 03:42	1991
Dietz & Ellsworth 1997, p. 43

Immediately after the earthquake, Bay Area airports were closed so officials could conduct a visual inspection and damage assessment procedures. San Jose International Airport, Oakland International Airport and San Francisco International Airport all opened the next morning. Large cracks in Oakland's runway and taxiway reduced the usable length to two-thirds normal, and damage to the dike required quick remediation to avoid flooding the runway with water from the bay. Oakland Airport repair costs were assessed at $30 million (equivalent to $82 million today).

San Francisco Municipal Railway (Muni) lost all power to electric transit systems when the quake hit, but otherwise suffered little damage and no injuries to operators or riders. Cable cars and electric trains and buses were stalled in place – half of Muni's transport capability was lost for 12 hours. Muni resorted to Diesel-powered buses to continue abbreviated service until electric power was restored later that night, and electric units could be inspected and readied for service on the morning of October 18. After 78 hours, 96 percent of Muni services were back in operation, including the cable cars. Amtrak intercity rail service into Oakland from the California Zephyr continued, but the Coast Starlight was temporarily suspended north of Salinas because of damage to the Southern Pacific Railroad's Coast Line.

The earthquake changed the Bay Area's automobile transportation landscape. Not only did the quake force seismic retrofitting of all Bay Area bridges, it caused enough damage that some parts of the region's freeway system had to be demolished. Damage to the region's transportation system was estimated at $1.8 billion (equivalent to $4.7 billion today).

- San Francisco–Oakland Bay Bridge, Interstate 80: The Bay Bridge was repaired and reopened to traffic in a month. However, the earthquake made it clear that the Bay Bridge, like many of California's toll bridges, required major repair or replacement for long-term viability and safety. Construction on a replacement for the eastern span began on January 29, 2002. The project was completed on September 2, 2013.
- Cypress Street Viaduct/Nimitz Freeway, Interstate 880: The 1.78-mile (2.86 km) double-deck Cypress Street Viaduct, Interstate 880 was demolished soon after the earthquake and was not replaced until July 1997 (To the Bay Bridge only, the ramps to and from Interstate 80 east were not completed until 2001 despite opening in 1999). The replacement freeway section, a single-deck structure, was re-routed around the outskirts of West Oakland, rather than bisecting it as the Cypress Street Viaduct had. The former route of the Cypress Street Viaduct was reopened as the ground-level Mandela Parkway.
- Embarcadero Freeway, State Route 480: Earthquake damage forced the closure and demolition of San Francisco's incomplete and controversial Embarcadero Freeway (State Route 480). This removal opened up San Francisco's Embarcadero area to new development. The elevated structure, which ran along San Francisco's waterfront, was demolished in 1991 and later replaced with a ground-level boulevard.
- Interstate 280: Seismic damage also forced the long-term closure of Interstate 280 in San Francisco (north of US 101), another concrete freeway that had never been completed to its originally planned route. The uncompleted northernmost stub of I-280 was demolished during August–October 1995 while one connecting ramp between northbound I-280 and southbound US 101 was opened in December 1995. The full I-280 project was completed in late 1997. In addition, another segment of Interstate 280 in Los Altos near State Route 85 also suffered seismic damage and was subsequently repaired.
- Central Freeway, U.S. Highway 101: San Francisco's Central Freeway (part of U.S. Route 101 and a key link to the Bay Bridge Flyover) was another concrete double-deck structure that faced demolition due to safety concerns. Originally terminating at Franklin Street and Golden Gate Avenue near San Francisco's Civic Center, the section past Fell Street was demolished first, then later the section between Mission and Fell Streets. The section from Mission Street to Market Street was rebuilt (completed September 2005) as a single-deck elevated freeway, touching down at Market Street and feeding into Octavia Boulevard, a ground-level urban parkway carrying traffic to and from the major San Francisco traffic arterials that the old elevated freeway used to connect to directly, including Fell and Oak Streets (which serve the city's western neighborhoods) and Franklin and Gough Streets (which serve northern neighborhoods and the Golden Gate Bridge).
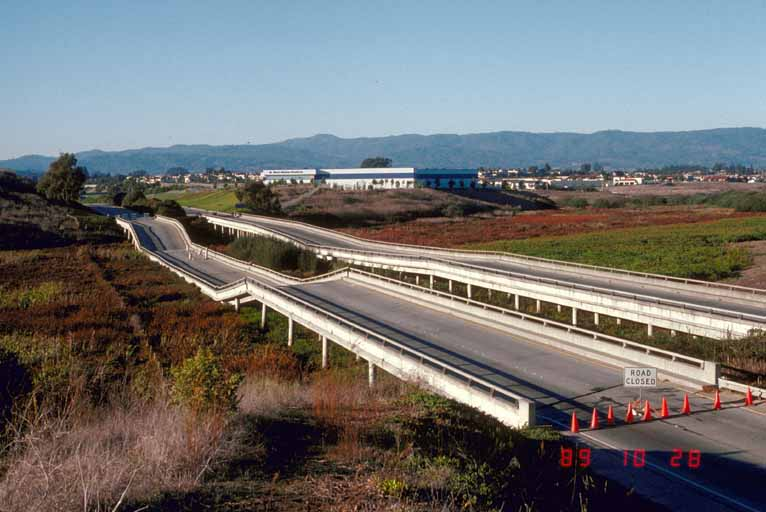
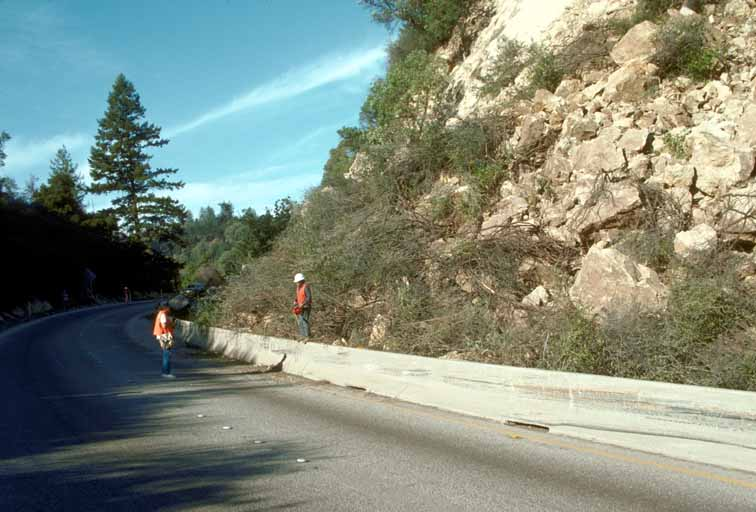
State Route 1 collapsed near Watsonville with Loma Prieta Peak visible in background (left) and landslide debris blocking both eastbound lanes of Highway 17 near Summit Road.
- State Route 17: Over half of the 26-mile (42 km) highway was closed for about one to two months because of landslides that occurred between Granite Creek Road in Scotts Valley and State Route 9 in Los Gatos; only buses and carpools with three or more people on board could cross it. After reopening, retaining walls and barbed wire fences were added in damaged areas to prevent any further landslides/rockslides. The route crosses the San Andreas Fault in the Santa Cruz Mountains, near the earthquake's epicenter.
- Cabrillo Highway, State Route 1: In Watsonville, the Struve Slough Bridge collapsed, with concrete/steel support columns penetrating the bridge deck. The highway was closed for several months until it could be demolished and rebuilt. Meanwhile, commuters used SR 152 and SR 129 as bypass routes. Another section of Highway 1 through Monterey suffered damage and had to be rebuilt as well. Additionally, the bridge carrying Highway 1 over the Salinas River near Highway 156 and Fort Ord was damaged and subsequently rebuilt.
- Bay Area Rapid Transit: The BART rail system, which hauled commuters between the East Bay and San Francisco via the Transbay Tube, was virtually undamaged and only closed for post-earthquake inspection. With the Bay Bridge closed because of its damage, the Transbay Tube became the quickest way into San Francisco via Oakland for a month, and ridership increased in the three work weeks following the earthquake, going from 218,000 riders per average weekday to more than 330,000 post-quake, a 50% increase. BART instituted round-the-clock train service until December 3, then returned to their normal schedule. In 2006, BART began the $1.3 billion Earthquake Safety Program to retrofit tunnels, aerial structures, and stations, which was completed in September of 2024.
- Amtrak: Historic 16th Street Station in West Oakland suffered significant damage and was rendered structurally unsound. Amtrak would shift its Oakland operations to a new station in Emeryville.
- Transbay Ferries: Ferry service between San Francisco and Oakland, which had ended decades before, was revived during the month-long closure of the Bay Bridge as an alternative to the overcrowded BART. A ferry terminal was put together in Alameda, and the U.S. Army Corps of Engineers dredged a suitable ferry dock at the Berkeley Marina. Additionally, the demolition of the quake-damaged Embarcadero Freeway led to the Ferry Building Terminal renovation, increasing the efficiency of ferry service to the peninsula. The passenger-only service proved popular and continues to expand its service. The need for a robust ferry system in the event that the region's roads and tunnels become impassable in an emergency led to the creation of the San Francisco Bay Ferry system.

== 1989 World Series and television coverage ==
The 1989 World Series featured the Oakland Athletics and the San Francisco Giants in the first cross-town World Series since 1956. Game 3 of the series was scheduled to begin at San Francisco's Candlestick Park on October 17 at 5:35 PDT, and American television network ABC began its pre-game show at 5:00 PDT to tune in for viewers in the Central and Eastern Time Zones. When the earthquake struck at approximately 5:04 PDT, sportscaster Tim McCarver was narrating taped highlights of Game 2, which had been played two days prior across the Bay Bridge in Oakland. Television viewers saw the video signal begin to break up, heard McCarver repeat a sentence as the shaking distracted him, and heard McCarver's colleague Al Michaels exclaim, "I'll tell you what, we're having an earth – ." At that moment, the signal from Candlestick Park was lost.

The network put up a green ABC Sports "World Series" technical difficulties telop graphic while it scrambled to repair the video feed (the broadcast cameras and mics were powered by the local power supply), but audio from the stadium was restored after thirteen seconds via a telephone link:

Al Michaels: Well, heh, I don't know if we're on the air... We are in commercial, I guess.

Jim Palmer: Yes, yes, we hear you.

Tim McCarver: I guess...

Michaels: I don't hear a thing.

McCarver: I guess Dave Parker...

Michaels: Well, heh, I don't know if we're on the air or not, and I'm not sure I care at this particular moment but we are. Well, folks, that's the greatest open in the history of television! Bar none!

McCarver: Opened with a bang!

Michaels: Yes, it certainly did! (laughs) We're still here! We are still, as we can tell, on the air, and I guess you are hearing us, even though we have no picture and no return audio, and we will be back—we hope—from San Francisco, in just a moment.

The combined screams of excitement and panic from fans who had no idea of the devastation elsewhere could be heard in the background. After airing several commercials for Acura, Tylenol, and Michelin, alongside the network promos of Good Morning America and multi-promos of Just the Ten of Us and Perfect Strangers, ABC then switched to the rerun of recently aired episodes of Roseanne and The Wonder Years, which were on standby for a rain delay situation, while attempting to restore electricity to its remote equipment. The first television news report of the earthquake, filed by reporter Mark Coogan, came over KABC-TV in Los Angeles at 5:11 p.m. PDT. KGO-TV, the local owned-and-operated ABC station in San Francisco, lost power for almost 15 minutes upon the start of the earthquake, before beginning its coverage with anchor Cheryl Jennings. On KGO-TV's feed during the outage, the network's "World Series" telop graphic was replaced with a station identification slide, recycled from the network's 1986-87 "Together" campaign, with "Please Stand By" text on top of the Circle 7 logo.

With anchorman Ted Koppel in position in Washington, D.C., ABC News began continuous coverage of the quake at 5:32 p.m. PDT, with Al Michaels, in the process, becoming a de facto on-site reporter for ABC. CBS News also began coverage around that same time with coverage from its San Francisco affiliate KPIX-TV when the network interrupted the docu-drama series Rescue 911. About an hour later, NBC News also began continuous coverage with Tom Brokaw anchoring and featuring local coverage from its then-San Francisco affiliate, KRON-TV, as the Big Three television networks suspended their primetime programming. A Goodyear Blimp had already been overhead to cover the baseball game, and ABC used it to capture images of damage to the Bay Bridge and other locations. The blimp pilot John Clayton reported that he felt four bumps during the quake. Local Fox affiliate KTVU was knocked off the air for over 90 minutes before returning to the air with a raw feed fed from one of the station's remote trucks. KTVU anchors Dennis Richmond and Elaine Corral began their coverage from the station's parking lot, as power had not yet been restored to that section of Oakland.

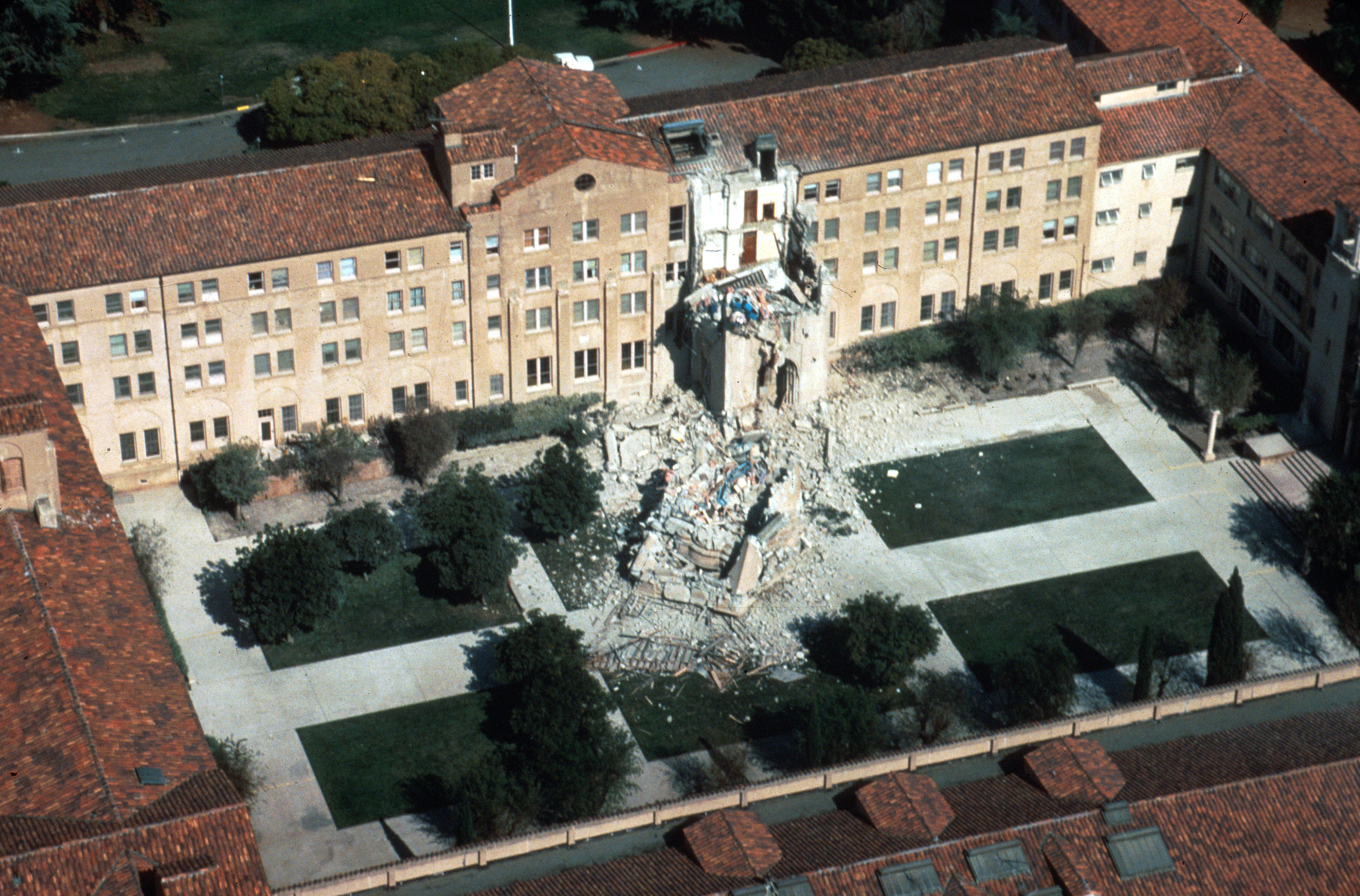
One person died when a five-story tower collapsed at St. Joseph's Seminary in Santa Clara County.

Inside Candlestick Park, fewer than half of the more than 62,000 fans had reached their seats by the time of the quake, and the load on the structure of the stadium was lower than maximum. There had also been a seismic-strengthening project previously completed on the upper deck concrete windscreen that may have prevented large numbers of injuries in the event of serious damage or even a catastrophic collapse. Fans reported that the stadium moved in an articulated manner as the earthquake wave passed through it, that the light standards swayed by many feet, and that the concrete upper deck windscreen moved in a wave-like manner over a distance of several feet. When electrical power to the stadium was lost, someone drove a police car onto the field, where an officer used the car's public address system to advise that the game had been postponed. After the shaking subsided, many of the players on both teams immediately searched for, and gathered, family and friends from the stands before evacuating the facility.

The October 18, 1989, edition of NBC's Today that covered the earthquake ran until noon Eastern Time. Bryant Gumbel, Jane Pauley and Deborah Norville anchored from Chicago (where they had planned to originally do a special celebratory edition), with reports done by Bob Jamieson and Don Oliver in San Francisco, and George Lewis in Oakland. Jim Miklaszewski and Bob Hager covered disaster response from Washington. NBC Sports commentators Bob Costas and Jimmy Cefalo discussed the effect the temblor would have on the 1989 World Series.

The World Series was later postponed while the Bay Area started the recovery process. While the teams' stadiums had suffered only minor damage, it took several days for power and transmission links at Candlestick Park to be repaired. Game 3 was rescheduled to October 27 still to be held in San Francisco after ten days (the longest delay in World Series history), with the Athletics defeating the Giants 13–7; the Athletics then completed the four-game sweep the following afternoon with a 9–6 victory in Game 4.

It is likely that the World Series game saved many lives, as Bay Area residents who would have normally been on the freeways were at home ready to watch the game when the earthquake hit. It is a rough estimate that thousands of people may have otherwise been on the Cypress Structure during the 5:00 p.m. rush-hour, as the structure was said to have carried 195,000 vehicles a day.

== See also ==
- 1906 San Francisco earthquake
- 1971 San Fernando earthquake
- 1989 Loma Prieta earthquake in popular culture
- 1994 Northridge earthquake
- Earthquake engineering
- List of earthquakes in California
- List of earthquakes in the United States
