= Dialing for Dollars =

1950s-1990s American and Canadian television franchise

Dialing for Dollars was a franchised format local television program in the United States and Canada, popular from the 1950s to the early 1990s.

== Format ==
These two ads show the Dialing for Dollars format in 1972-73 on two sister stations, KXMB-TV in Bismarck/Mandan, N.D. and KXMC-TV in Minot, N.D. They illustrate how local stations used their own talent and set design to create a Dialing for Dollars series.

At the beginning of a typical Dialing for Dollars program, the host (a local television personality) would announce the day's password, which often contained one or more of the following: a secret word, the amount of money at stake, and a randomly determined "count." Each time the game was played, the host would randomly select and call a telephone number, using either numbers previously submitted by viewers or slips of paper cut from residential telephone directories from a bag or a drumroll. If the chosen person answered the call within a set number of rings and gave the correct password, he/she won the money at stake; if not, money was added to the prize for the next playing. The prize was reset to a starting value after it was won.

The count, when it was part of the password, consisted of a number from 1 to 9 (or 10 in some markets) and a direction of "up" or "down" (in some markets, "top" or "bottom"). Those were being delivered in various ways in different markets, such as a flip machine, a wheel, or an electronic counter among others. The host drew a slip cut from the telephone book(s) for the viewing area, each containing several numbers, then used the count to choose the number by counting down from the first number listed or up from the last one. For example, a count of "6 Down" (or "6 Top") meant that the sixth number down from the top would be called. A common password was "the count and the amount," or the day's count and the total money at stake on that particular playing.

Dialing for Dollars originated as a radio program in 1939 on WCBM in Baltimore, Maryland, hosted by Homer Todd. With the advent and rise of commercial television broadcasting in the U.S. during the late 1940s and 1950s, the format switched to television and was franchised nationally as a popular, low-budget way to fill local market airtime, especially in the late mornings.

On some stations (such as KTVU hosted by Pat McCormick, who also did voices for the Charley & Humphry puppets during a local cartoon show), the Dialing for Dollars format would be used during the local telecasting of a morning or afternoon movie. The film would be interrupted by a Dialing for Dollars segment every so often, rather than going to a commercial break, after which the program either went to a commercial or directly back to the film. On others, such as WKBW's version and WTNH's version, both versions are variety shows complete with studio audience and mini-games, The difference between both stations is that WTNH's version also contains special guests and performances after dialing games or mini-games. However, WKBW's version runs for an entire hour, and WTNH's version runs for 30 minutes as normal.

By the mid-1970s, the popularity faded for the Dialing for Dollars format, as competition developed from daytime talk shows, and more sophisticated game shows coming from syndication. Another factor in the show's decline was the trend of fewer households having stay-at-home members available to answer the phone during the day. Dialing for Dollars left the Baltimore airwaves in 1977 (although it is still seen in a few markets), after giving away $800,000 locally in its 38-year run there on radio and television.

Broadway producer Lee Guber attempted to resurrect the concept on a national basis in 1987, meeting with Canadian broadcaster Peter Emmerson with regards to hosting what would have emanated from the former GFG Productions facilities in Brooklyn. The project was never completed due to Guber's illness which was diagnosed soon after; he died of a brain tumor on March 27, 1988.

The program has also been satirized on the Canadian sketch comedy series SCTV.

Live with Kelly and Ryan carries on the tradition with its daily Travel Trivia contest, and a few local shows directly trace their lineage to Dialing for Dollars (an example is AM Buffalo).

The program was also referenced in Janis Joplin's classic hit song "Mercedes Benz" from the 1970 album "Pearl".

More recently, cable network Adult Swim has periodically revived the concept beginning in mid-2018 for its online livestream; due to the original concept being rendered obsolete by the advancement of technology, instead viewers of the livestream must memorize a certain word (indicated by the onscreen appearance of a plane marked "SPY"). Viewers that enter their phone number into the Adult Swim website can then have a chance to be picked to win a prize of some sort if they are picked during the drawing (which is broadcast Thursdays at 9PM on the livestream) and say the correct word.

== List of stations that carried Dialing for Dollars ==
- CICT-TV (formerly CFAC) – Calgary, Alberta, Canada
- KARK-TV – Little Rock, Arkansas (originally used for newscasts since 2018)
- KATC-TV – Lafayette, Louisiana
- KBJR-TV (formerly WDSM) – Superior, Wisconsin/Duluth, Minnesota
- KCOP – Los Angeles, California, Johnny Gilbert hosted the show.
- KCPQ – Seattle, Washington
- KCRG-TV – Cedar Rapids, Iowa (February 1968 – January 1972), hosted by George Patrick.
- KDIX-TV –Dickinson, North Dakota, hosted by Stan Deck and Lorren Haake
- KELO-TV – Sioux Falls, South Dakota, during the noon news block
- KFIZ-TV – Fond du Lac, Wisconsin
- KJEO-TV – Fresno, California
- KHON – Honolulu, Hawaii, aired for a short time from 1968 until 1969. It was primarily hosted by Jim Peters, with Sydette Sakauye and Diane Lockwood taking over on alternate weeks.
- KICU-TV – San Jose, California (late–1990s)
- KIII-TV – Corpus Christi, Texas
- KMBC-TV – Kansas City, Missouri (1966–1968)
- KODE-TV – Joplin, Missouri
- KOAT-TV – Albuquerque, New Mexico (September 1966 – June 1984)
- KOBI – Medford, Oregon, used a different format version of Dialing for Dollars titled "Jackpot Bingo" which had different formats and developments until canceled in 1988.
- KPAC-TV – Port Arthur, Texas
- KPHO – Phoenix, Arizona (January 1965 – 1971), originally aired as a 30-minute program until 1968 when it began airing during movie breaks.
- KPTV – Portland, Oregon
- KQTV – St. Joseph, Missouri (late–1970s)
- KRQE – Albuquerque, New Mexico (early–1970s)
- KSHB-TV – Kansas City, Missouri (early-1970s, short-lived)
- KSL-TV – Salt Lake City, Utah
- KSTP-TV – Minneapolis/St. Paul, Minnesota, 30-minute (later 60-minute) local television game/variety show in color, hosted by Jim Hutton (1964–1970).
- KTAL-TV – Shreveport, Louisiana, “Dialing for Thousands” (1980s and 1990s), hosted by Ron Young
- KTBS-TV – Shreveport, Louisiana, first known as "Dialing For Dollars Theatre".
- KTHV – Little Rock, Arkansas, under a different title, to compete with KARK
- KTNT – Seattle, Washington, hosted by Al Cummings (nicknamed "Mr. Fortune")
- KTRK-TV – Houston, Texas (1968–1977)
- KTSM-TV – El Paso, Texas, hosted by weatherman and former El Paso city councilman Ted Bender.
- KTVI-TV – Saint Louis, Missouri, hosted by Morgan Hatch.
- KTVU – Oakland, California, Ran through multiple variations over the years since 1967. Mel Venter and later Bob March in the morning and Pat McCormick in the afternoon hosted the show. Bob Eldred hosted an evening version called "The Jackpot Movie." KTVU canceled its longtime run in September 1986 due to "poor revenue and the station not keeping up with their money".
- KTVX – Salt Lake City, Utah, hosted by disc-jockey Lynn Lehmann. KCPX/KTVX's version aired during The Mike Douglas Show from 1967 until 1972, and it was later aired during episodes of To Tell the Truth and Truth or Consequences.
- KUSA – Denver, Colorado, also as KBTV, Stormy Rottman hosted the segments.
- KVLY-TV (then KTHI-TV) – Fargo/Grand Forks, North Dakota, hosted by Bob Ivers
- KXLY-TV – Spokane, Washington
- KXMB-TV – Bismarck, North Dakota, hosted by Rodger Dixens and Karen MacKinson (1972 until 1977)
- KXMC-TV – Minot, North Dakota hosted by Davey Bee and a lady simply known as Euenvo (during the 1970s)
- WAAY-TV – Huntsville, Alabama
- WALA-TV – Mobile, Alabama, hosted by Danny Treanor, ran for a short time from 1968 until 1970.
- WANE-TV – Fort Wayne, Indiana, hosted by Dave King
- WAVE-TV – Louisville, Kentucky, aired during "Channel 3's Morning Show" and afternoon reruns of Dr. Kildare (February 1967 until April 1968).
- WAVY-TV – Norfolk, Virginia, hosted by Murray Roberts (1960’s), followed by a 30-minute program hosted by Troy Strait (1971-1972).
- WAWV-TV (then WIIL-TV) – Terre Haute, Indiana, hosted by Woody Berlin
- WBBH-TV – Fort Myers, Florida, aired for a short time until WEVU took it over.
- WBRC-TV – Birmingham, Alabama, originally known as "The Dialing for Dollars Movie" in 1972, but was renamed simply "Dialing for Dollars" when it aired during syndicated programming. WBRC's version only lasted for less than two years in the early-1970s.
- WCBD-TV – Charleston, South Carolina, hosted by Betty Hudson.
- WCIA-TV – Champaign, Illinois
- WCIX – Miami, Florida, Patricia San Pedro hosted the show.
- WCWB-TV – Macon, Georgia, first hosted by Barbara Cheshire, later taken over by an unknown woman with her last name being Colson for a short period of time, and ran during "Fortune Feature" movies from 1971 until 1974.
- WDAF-TV – Kansas City, Missouri (late-1960s, short-lived)
- WDBB-TV – Tuscaloosa, Alabama, originally called "Dialing for Big Bucks", hosted by Brent Jones.
- WDSU-TV – New Orleans, Louisiana
- WEVU-TV – Fort Myers, Florida, hosted by Gary Firestone (late–1970s)
- WEWS-TV – Cleveland, Ohio (September–December 1971)
- WFAA-TV – Dallas, Texas, hosts included Ed Hogan, Ross Cass, and "Dandy" Don Norman. It lasted from 1965 until 1978.
- WFBC-TV – Greenville, South Carolina (September 1969 – June 1970), aired during both its afternoon newscasts and The Mike Douglas Show on weekdays.
- WFBM-TV – Indianapolis, Indiana, hosted by George L. Davis, aired during breaks in several syndicated talk and entertainment programs such as The Steve Allen Show, The Virginia Graham Show, and Jim Gerald (January 1969 – Early 1970s)
- WFLD-TV - Chicago, Illinois (late–1960s, early–1970s) hosted by Jerry G. Bishop
- WFRV-TV – Green Bay, Wisconsin (September 4, 1966 – Early 1980s), hosted by Cal Dring.
- WFTV – Orlando, Florida, hosted by Russ Wheeler beginning in 1970, later by Pete Forgione until January 1984, and later by Merita Valentine until October 1984. An unknown personality hosted the last 3 months of the program, which was canceled on January 4, 1985.
- WGHP-TV – High Point, North Carolina (1968–1980), hosted by Dick Bennick and later Jo Nelson.
- WHBQ-TV – Memphis, Tennessee (January 6, 1969 – September 1, 1978), WHBQ news anchor Dave Brown was the original program host and continued various times during its run. Later hosts included local talk show hostess Marge Thrasher.
- WHTN-TV – Huntington, West Virginia (September 1973 – March 1975)
- WHO-TV – Des Moines, Iowa, hosted by Bob Williams. It aired during its "Early Show Movie" and The Merv Griffin Show. WHO-TV's version also features a game show segment where prizes are hidden in pyramid-stacked boxes.
- WISN-TV – Milwaukee, Wisconsin. Dialing for Dollars began at the station in December 1967. A news/talk/contest show, the program is noted for its long-standing husband-and-wife hosting team of Howard and Rosemary Gernette. The Dialing contest remained when the show was rechristened At Twelve in 1980.
- WJKS-TV – Jacksonville, Florida
- WJSU-TV – Anniston, Alabama
- WJZ-TV – Baltimore, Maryland, used "The Hustle" as the theme music, and at one point in the 1970s, Oprah Winfrey hosted the show.
- WKBD-TV – Detroit, Michigan, aired during the final quarter of the 1960s.
- WKBF-TV – Cleveland, Ohio, Gary Essex hosted the short-lived version until his move to WKYC-TV in October 1968.
- WKBN-TV – Youngstown, Ohio, hosted by Rich Morgan ("The Money Movie")
- WKBW-TV – Buffalo, New York, practically, this show was never canceled. Its name was changed when Dave Thomas/Dave Roberts left the station for WPVI in 1978, and the show was renamed without the Dialing for Dollars franchise to AM Buffalo, which still airs today.
- WLBZ – Bangor, Maine
- WLCY-TV / WTSP – St. Petersburg, Florida, the 45-minute version of the show only ran from 1957-1959, and Tampa never had a Dialing for Dollars program until 1965 when WSUN-TV took it over. And in 1967, WTSP took over the show and ran until 1970 and WTOG Channel 44 ran the series.
- WLKY – Louisville, Kentucky (1972–74)
- WLNE-TV – New Bedford, Massachusetts, George Allen hosted the show
- WMAR-TV – Baltimore, Maryland (1948 – 1977), hosted by George Rogers and later in the 1960s and 1970s by Stu Kerr. Kerr referred to himself as "Mr. Fortune" on the show. His co-host was Sylvia Scott.
- WNAC-TV – Boston, Massachusetts, Ed Miller hosted the show.
- WNEP-TV – Scranton, Pennsylvania, WNEP had both an normal Dialing for Dollars from 1966 to 1975, and a similar formatted version on its 16.2 subchannel in the mid-2010s.
- WNEW-TV – New York City, short-lived, hosted by an unknown man (nicknamed Mr. Fortune) (1966–67).
- WPLG-TV – Miami, Florida Jay L. Mann hosted, only lasted in the early–1970s until WCIX-TV took over the show in the mid-1970s.
- WPRI-TV – Providence, Rhode Island (late–1960s, early–1970s) hosted by Salty Brine
- WPTV-TV – West Palm Beach, Florida, Dave Davis hosted the show.
- WPVI-TV – Philadelphia, first hosted by Bob McLean in 1973, who would later host a talk show in Canada on CBC Television; it was also presented by Jim O'Brien. The show ended on May 1, 1978, when it was replaced by A.M. Philadelphia.
- WRAL-TV – Raleigh, North Carolina, presented by Bob DeBardelaben, later forecaster of the station.
- WRET-TV – Charlotte, North Carolina (April 7 – August 8, 1980), hosted by Tony Alexi. Its format contains questions related to news headlines.
- WREX-TV – Rockford, Illinois
- WROC-TV – Rochester, New York, hosted by Ann Keefe.
- WSAZ-TV – Huntington, West Virginia (January 1966 – May 1967)
- WSPA-TV – Greenville, South Carolina (September 1968 – January 1969)
- WSTM-TV (formerly WSYR-TV) – Syracuse, New York, hosted by Ed Murphy
- WSUN-TV – St. Petersburg, Florida, WSUN's version only lasted from the mid-1960s until 1967 when WTSP took the show over again for the first time since its last run in 1959, and ran until 1970.
- WTAE-TV – Pittsburgh, Pennsylvania (September 29, 1965 – 1972)
- WTCN-TV – Minneapolis/St. Paul, Minnesota; Mel Jass hosted Dialing for Dollars as a segment incorporated into his Mel's Matinee Movie program for a short time in 1970-71 before it was reverted into a short-lived 30-minute program hosted by Warren Martin a short time later until February 1972.
- WTEN-TV – Albany, New York, co-hosted by Ralph Vartigian and John Stewart from 1970-1975.
- WTNH-TV – New Haven, Connecticut, 30-minute local television game/variety show.
- WTOG – St Petersburg, Florida, once known as "Cinema 44 Cash Call", later renamed as "Tele-Quest" in 1988.
- WTOL-TV – Toledo, Ohio, during The Big Show (weekday afternoon movie), hosted by weatherman and former WKBN-TV employee Joseph J. Ashton.
- WTVC-TV – Chattanooga, Tennessee
- WTVF-TV (previously WLAC-TV) – Nashville, Tennessee
- WTVN-TV (now WSYX-TV) – Columbus, Ohio
- WVEC-TV – Norfolk, Virginia
- WXEX-TV (now WRIC-TV) – Richmond, Virginia (one-hour show ran from about 1959 until 1970)
- WXIA-TV – Atlanta, Georgia, Linda Faye Carson and Don Barber, then Freddie Miller hosted the show.
- WYTV-TV – Youngstown, Ohio (1965–1966)

=== Other local formats ===
A similar format, The Money Man, was used on WLOS-TV Asheville, North Carolina, in the late 1960s. Host Bob Caldwell would call viewers and ask them to tell how much money was in the jackpot and name the show or star of the day. This aired in late afternoons, during reruns of Perry Mason and the station's 5:30 PM newscast.

Another similar format, the Prize Movie, aired on weekday afternoons for many years beginning in the early-1970s on WUAB-TV in Cleveland, Ohio; host John Lanigan would call people in a manner similar to Dialing for Dollars, by using a rotating drum, and would spin a wheel containing photos of both station personalities and stars of the syndicated fare seen on the station; he would then ask the caller to identify that person or show. If they did so successfully, the host would deliver one out of six cards that were labeled WUAB-TV. The caller would then receive a small prize, such as small gifts, and was followed by a question that was worth the money. If they answered the question correctly, the caller wins the jackpot (which always ended in 43 cents). The setup had a few major changes in its 20-year run. The first wheel had pegs located at the back of the wheel rather than the front at first and all of the photos were printed in black and white. By the mid-1980s, both the setup and the wheel received an update and a makeover. The wheel resembles a film reel located far to the right from the host's desk, with pegs in the front rather than the back in the first wheel, and color-printed photos were added as well. This lasted for many years until September 10, 1993, when the station opted to replace the Prize Movie with a slate of syndicated talk shows in the fall of 1993; this was a failure and the Prize Movie was brought back in January 1994 by Lanigan himself featuring both a new gameboard and gameplay. This didn't last long, and the show quickly ended for good that August.

- A similar Prize Movie format took place on Fox station WTTE-TV in Columbus, Ohio in 1989, when Fox 28 Kids Club host Susan Gilbert promoted a short-lived contest for viewers to win various prizes including a trip to the then-new Disney MGM Studios at Walt Disney World. The contest used the same formula as the Prize Movie with a much wider wheel with no pegs containing eight photos of Disney characters in each colorful space.

WFLI-TV in Chattanooga, Tennessee, beginning with its first year of operation in 1987, ran a 30-minute live and locally-produced program entitled 53 Trivia Spin. The program was equivalent to the Dialing for Dollars format, hosted by Bob Broome and Cynthia Davis. Bob would give the viewers a question, and then a person would call in to answer the question. Once the caller gets a correct answer, the caller then chooses a number between 1 and 18 (including two "53" spaces) that were listed on the wheel before Cynthia would spin it. Once a random non-selected number was landed, the caller would win a selected amount of money or a smaller prize that was given such as coupons and tickets. If a selected number was landed, a big prize would be given to the caller such as vehicles and trips. Prizes were changed each round.

- A similar Trivia Spin format took place on KPBI-CD, the then-Fox affiliate in Fort Smith, Arkansas in the late-1990s entitled Spin for the Wheel of Riches, which aired as a segment on its lifestyle-leaning morning show 46 Good Day and used a horse racing wheel in the segment.
- The short-lived children's television show The Good Time Gang from KXTX-TV in Dallas, Texas in both 1977 and 1978 had a segment where brother-team hosts Frank and Daryl Kurtz will call a random child on the phone before one of the brothers would spin a wheel with prizes written in marker on each colorful space.
  - WXNE-TV in Boston had a similar variant in their version of The Good Time Gang in the late-1970s featuring a Wild West-themed setup. Prizes were listed 1 through 8, and a person would spin an antique wagon wheel with an arrow attached on a spoke.
- KLFY-TV in Lafayette, Louisiana, had a similar format in the mid-1980s called 10 To Win which aired as segments on weeknight syndicated reruns. A customized roulette wheel was used.

== See also ==
- Bowling for Dollars
- TV Powww
