= Pat McCormick =

Pat McCormick may refer to:

- Pat McCormick (actor) (1927–2005), appeared in Smokey and the Bandit, wrote for The Tonight Show
- Patricia McCormick (author) (born 1956), American journalist and writer of realistic fiction for young adults
- Patricia McCormick (bullfighter) (1929–2013)
- Pat McCormick (diver) (1930–2023), Olympic gold medalist
- Pat McCormick (television personality) (born c. 1933), Oakland, California area television weatherman

== See also ==
- Patty McCormack (born 1945), stage, film and television actress
- Pat McCormack (disambiguation)
