= Michael Tuck (journalist) =

American journalist (1945–2022)

- Born: John Michael Tuck; September 10, 1945; Silsbee, Texas, U.S.
- Died: August 17, 2022 (aged 76); San Diego, California, U.S.
- Education: Trinity University
- Occupation: News anchor
- Notable credit(s): KFMB-TV; KGTV; KCBS-TV; KUSI-TV
- Spouse: Jill
- Children: Collin and Jackson (sons); Tyler (daughter)
- Relatives: Cecil and Gene (brothers), Elizabeth (sister)

John Michael Tuck (September 10, 1945 – August 17, 2022) was an American journalist. He was best known for his work on television in Southern California where he had anchored for television stations in San Diego and Los Angeles.

== Early career ==
From 1967 to 1970, Tuck (during his studies at Trinity University) worked at San Antonio station KENS-TV. In 1970, he joined then-independent station KTVU in Oakland/San Francisco where he joined with Ron Fortner to form The Tuck-Fortner Report. After their news program was cancelled in 1974, Tuck left KTVU and joined WCAU in Philadelphia to anchor their TV-10 News alongside Jack Jones. However, in 1976, both Tuck and Jones were replaced by Ralph Penza and Joan Dinerstein. Jones left WCAU for KYW-TV and Tuck continued with WCAU as a weekend anchor until 1978.

== Work in Southern California ==
=== Early years in San Diego ===
Tuck began his San Diego career in 1978 for CBS affiliate KFMB-TV. Under the direction of news director Jim Holtzman, news ei8ht with Tuck, co-anchors Allison Ross and Hal Clement, weathercaster Clark Anthony and sports anchor Ted Leitner help led KFMB rise up to first-place position in 1979. In 1984, Tuck left KFMB for ABC affiliate KGTV where alongside co-anchors Carol LeBeau, Bree Walker and Kimberly Hunt helped made KGTV reclaim the #1 position in San Diego news ratings. In addition, KGTV gained credibility with "Perspectives," a nightly commentary delivered by Tuck which utilized a fairly predictable formula. It started with Tuck by either attacking or praising an individual or organization, then explains his premises and draws a strong conclusion—all served up with a voice that seems to emanate, in tone and intent, from behind a burning bush. For sake of distinguishing between commentary and news anchoring, Tuck did his "Perspectives" without a jacket and his tie loosened.

=== Los Angeles years ===
In 1990, Tuck left KGTV and joined Los Angeles television station KCBS-TV in September. At KCBS-TV, Tuck anchored the Channel 2 Action News and also brought his "Perspectives" commentary segments to that stations newscasts. Tuck's co-anchors at KCBS-TV included Walker, Tritia Toyota and former KABC-TV newscaster Ann Martin. However, as a result of a news room shake-up, Tuck was dismissed from KCBS-TV in August 1999 (which became CBS 2 News at the time of his departure). He later cited his disenchantment with the station's high management turnover and, from his perspective, an obsession with celebrities and sensationalism in its news coverage.

=== Return to San Diego ===
Tuck returned to KFMB-TV in 1999 and resumed his position as anchor for News 8, which later became Local 8 News from 2001 to 2005. He departed KFMB-TV in late 2004 and in the following year, joined KUSI-TV as news anchor for their daily afternoon and evening newscasts alongside his KGTV colleague Kimberly Hunt. Tuck departed KUSI-TV in 2007.

== Filmography ==
- Prizzi's Honor (1985) – Anchorman "Fred"
- Armageddon (1998) – American Newscaster

== Personal life ==
Tuck was a resident of the Rancho Bernardo neighborhood in northeastern San Diego. He died on August 17, 2022, of post-stroke complications.
