= KTVU =

Television station in Oakland, California

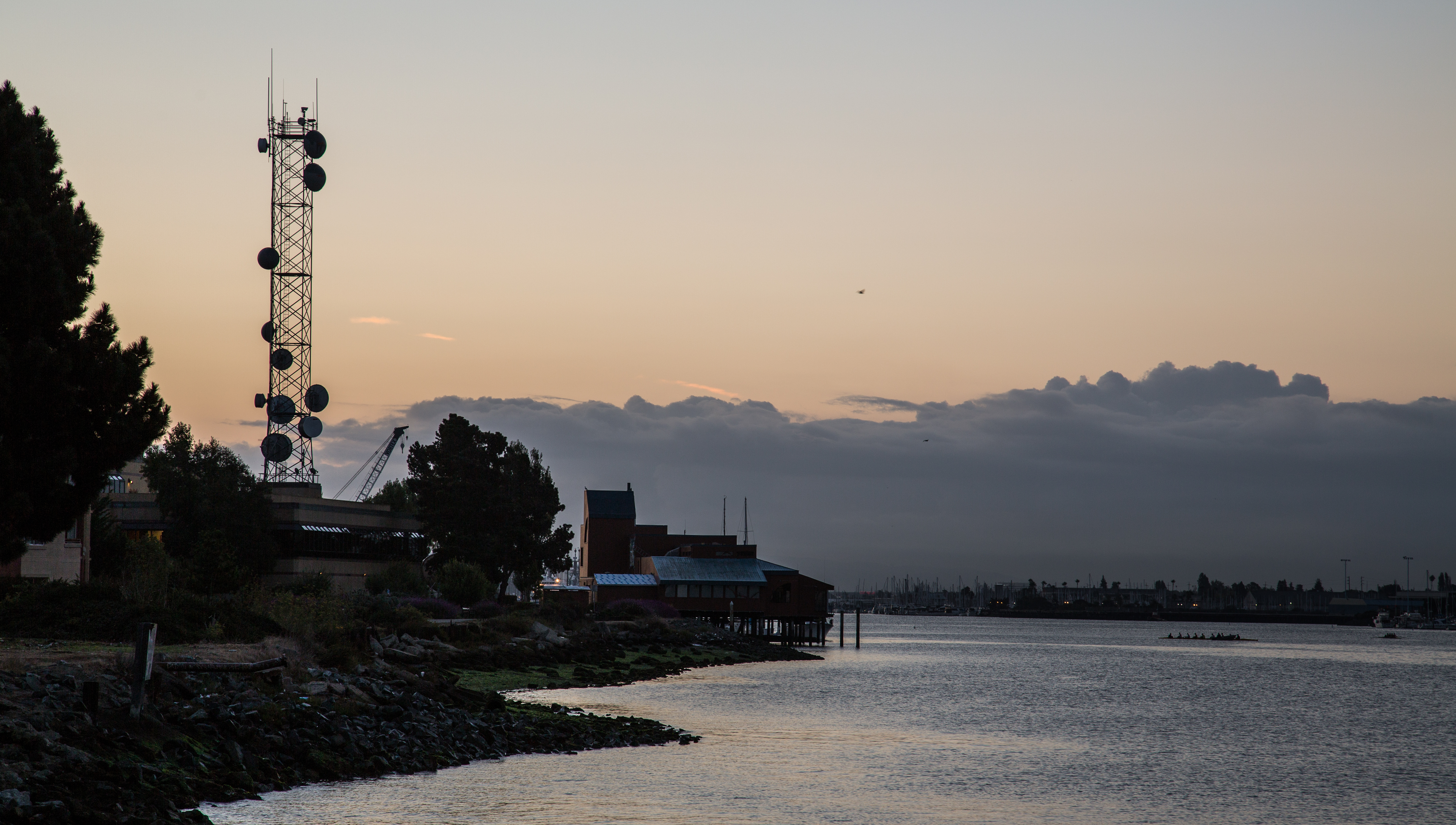
- The KTVU studios (left) overlooking the Oakland Estuary in Oakland's Jack London Square
- Oakland–San Francisco–San Jose, California; United States
- City: Oakland, California
- Channels: Digital: 31 (UHF); Virtual: 2
- Branding: KTVU FOX 2; KTVU FOX 2 News

Programming
- Affiliations: 2.1: Fox; for others, see § Subchannels

Ownership
- Owner: Fox Television Stations, LLC
- Sister stations: KICU-TV

History
- Founded: June 1957
- First air date: March 3, 1958
- Former channel numbers: Analog: 2 (VHF, 1958–2009); Digital: 56 (UHF, 1998–2009), 44 (UHF, 2009–2020)
- Former affiliations: Independent (1958–1986)
- Call sign meaning: No meaning

Technical information
- Licensing authority: FCC
- Facility ID: 35703
- ERP: 1,000 kW
- HAAT: 512 m (1,680 ft)
- Transmitter coordinates: 37°45′19″N 122°27′10″W
- Translator(s): 26 (UHF) San Jose

Links
- Public license information: Public file; LMS
- Website: www.ktvu.com

KTVU (channel 2) is a television station licensed to Oakland, California, United States, serving the San Francisco Bay Area. It is owned and operated by the Fox network through its Fox Television Stations division alongside San Jose–licensed KICU-TV (channel 36). The two stations share studios at Jack London Square in Oakland; KTVU's transmitter is located at Sutro Tower in San Francisco.

== History ==
=== As an independent station ===
The station first signed on the air on March 3, 1958, originally operating as an independent station. The station was originally owned by San Francisco–Oakland Television, Inc., a local firm whose principals were William D. Pabst and Ward D. Ingrim, former executives at the Don Lee Network and KFRC (610 AM); and Edwin W. Pauley, a Bay Area businessman who had led a separate group which competed against Pabst and Ingrim for the station's construction permit. The call sign was originally ascribed to have no meaning at all, but several engineers from KTVU, an early UHF station in Stockton, California, came to work for the new station, and purportedly suggested the calls.

KTVU's operations were inaugurated with a special live telecast from its temporary studio facility at the former Paris Theatre in downtown Oakland. That June, the station moved into a permanent facility at Jack London Square in western Oakland, which was constructed using material gathered by the Port of Oakland and repurposed from a demolished pier.

Channel 2 was the fourth commercial television station to sign on in the Bay Area, and the first independent station in the market. During its first 15 years on the air, KTVU's transmitter facilities were originally based on a tower on San Bruno Mountain in northern San Mateo County. KTVU moved its transmitter facilities to the Sutro Tower after the structure was completed in 1973.

The Ingrim–Pabst–Pauley group attempted to sell KTVU to NBC in 1960, as the network sought to acquire a television station in the Bay Area to operate alongside KNBC radio. The sale was eventually canceled in October 1961, due to pre-existing concerns over the sale cited by the Federal Communications Commission (FCC) that were related to NBC's ownership of radio and television stations in Philadelphia. A second sale attempt proved successful in July 1963, when KTVU was sold to Miami Valley Broadcasting Company, precursor to Cox Media Group, for $12.3 million.

Over the station's history as an independent, KTVU's programming schedule consisted mainly of syndicated off-network series, movies, talk shows and religious programs, as well as a sizeable amount of locally produced news, sports, talk and public affairs programming. In 1960, after acquiring camera, projection and slide equipment to transmit programming available in the format, the station began broadcasting its programming in color; much of the programs that it broadcast in color consisted of movies and certain series acquired from the syndication market that were produced in the format, as well as locally produced specials.

In October 1962, a sister station agreement with RKB Mainichi Broadcasting from Fukuoka was signed. The first programs provided by RKB aired in November of that year, both covering the newly-acquired sister city status.

Under Cox's stewardship, channel 2 became the leading independent station in the San Francisco–Oakland market and one of the top-rated independents in the Western United States. KTVU retained this status even as competing independents on the UHF band signed on, including KBHK-TV (channel 44) and KEMO-TV (channel 20) both in early 1968.

KTVU debuted Creature Features on Saturday evenings on January 9, 1971, with Bob Wilkins as a horror host; Wilkins previously hosted similar programs in Sacramento at KCRA-TV and KTXL. An immediate hit, Creature Features topped Saturday Night Live in local ratings, prompting John Belushi and John Landis to guest appear on the program in 1978 promoting National Lampoon's Animal House. Wilkins also interviewed then-local author Anne Rice upon the publication of Interview with the Vampire as well as, among many others, Christopher Lee, William Shatner and local independent filmmaker Ernie Fosselius (of Hardware Wars fame). Wilkins also hosted Captain Cosmic, presenting Japanese anime including Star Blazers and Ultra Man. Wilkins retired in 1979, ending Captain Cosmic; former San Francisco Chronicle reporter and occasional co-host John Stanley took over hosting Creature Features until its 1982 cancellation.

In the early 1960s, KTVU obtained the local broadcast rights to the Warner Bros. Pictures library; the films it broadcast from the studio primarily consisted of those released during the 1950s, most being presented in color, which aired at 7 p.m. on Sundays. Channel 2 was the first television station in the Bay Area to air such films as A Star Is Born, East of Eden and Rebel Without a Cause. KTVU exercised discretion and limited the number of commercial break interruptions during the movie telecasts, often airing the films uncensored and with commentary, either by a studio host or via slides. The station even televised the Metro-Goldwyn-Mayer film Hollywood Revue of 1929 with some of the original two-strip Technicolor sequences. During the early 1970s, the station began employing a different programming strategy to stand out from the other independents in the market, acquiring first-run syndicated sitcoms and drama series, several comedies and dramas from the United Kingdom (such as Upstairs, Downstairs and The Benny Hill Show, the latter of which had some episodes re-edited by the station to remove scenes of frontal nudity accidentally left in the broadcast prints), and various nature series (including National Geographic specials) as alternative offerings.

KTVU occasionally aired movies originally assigned an R rating for their theatrical release (such as One Flew Over the Cuckoo's Nest and Walkabout) without editing for strong profanity, nudity or violence, some of which aired during prime time. In 1992, KTVU ran a station-edited version of the 1984 science fiction film Dune, which combined footage from the Alan Smithee television cut with the original theatrical release (thereby restoring all the violence featured in the latter cut, while eliminating some of the objectionable edits that caused director David Lynch to remove his name from the credits of the television print). KTVU also carried programming from the Operation Prime Time programming service (at least) in 1978.

On December 16, 1978, KTVU was uplinked to satellite as a superstation, carried primarily on systems operated by Cox Cable.

=== Fox affiliation ===
KTVU, along with Cox-owned WKBD-TV in Detroit and KDNL-TV in St. Louis, agreed to become charter affiliates of Fox upon their October 9, 1986, launch. KTVU was a rarity among the new network's affiliate base as it broadcast on VHF and had an established news department; general manager Kevin O'Brien saw Fox's backing with the 20th Century Fox studio as an advantage, providing the station access to major stars. The network launched with The Late Show with Joan Rivers in late night and did not begin programming in prime time until the following April.

Cox Enterprises acquired KICU-TV on November 29, 1999, from a group led by Buffalo Bills owner Ralph Wilson; KICU moved to KTVU's studios in Oakland, while their former studio became home to KTVU's South Bay news bureau.

=== Becoming a Fox-owned outlet ===
Reports emerged in August 2013 that Fox Television Stations, the owned-stations division for Fox, was seeking to buy stations in San Francisco and Seattle; Variety reported that Fox desired having owned-stations in markets with NFL teams in the National Football Conference, and followed their purchase of CW affiliate WJZY in Charlotte, North Carolina, which switched to Fox. KTVU was the largest Fox affiliate in the country not owned by the network. Fox's then-parent 21st Century Fox made several offers to buy KTVU, and also considered buying KIRO-TV in Seattle from Cox, but Cox turned down each of these proposals.

Fox and Cox Media agreed to an asset swap on June 24, 2014, where Cox sold KTVU and KICU to Fox; in turn, Fox sold to Cox Media both WFXT in Boston and WHBQ-TV in Memphis. As part of the trade, WFXT general manager Gregg Kelly was reassigned to KTVU, while KTVU general manager Tom Raponi moved to WFXT.

== Programming ==
=== Local productions ===
From 1958 until the early 1970s, KTVU aired the space-themed afternoon children's program Captain Satellite, which was hosted by Bob March and was set in a fictional spaceship known as the Starfinder II. The series—which was originally produced at Moose Hall in Oakland, before moving to the KTVU studios in 1959—showcased cartoons between segments (including among others The Space Explorers), as well as film clips provided by NASA and live in-studio visits from astronauts.

Until the 1980s, the station produced a series of classic public service shorts titled Bits and Pieces, often featuring two talking puppets, Charley and Humphrey, which Pat McCormick had brought over to KTVU from his tenure at KGO-TV. The shorts, which often aired during children's programs shown on the station, were aimed at delivering positive and educational messages to kids. In the late 1970s, Charley and Humphrey were spun off into a daily children's program on KTVU, which was hosted by McCormick. Channel 2 also served as the Bay Area's originating station for the children's television program franchise Romper Room; originally hosted by Nancy Besst, the half-hour program aired at 8:30 a.m. on weekday mornings for much of the 1980s.

Other local programs that aired on KTVU during its run as an independent station included the film showcase/trivia game show franchise Dialing for Dollars, which was first hosted by Mel Venter and later by Pat McCormick, who later served as a weather anchor at the station; National All-Star Wrestling, which aired on Friday nights during the early and mid-1960s from the KTVU studios or Daly City's Cow Palace and was hosted by Walt Harris; and Roller Derby, which Harris also hosted for many years and featured San Francisco Bay Bombers roller derby games until the demise of the International Roller Derby League in 1973. During the early 2000s, KTVU broadcast the San Francisco Chinese New Year Parade.

=== Sports coverage ===
KTVU began carrying San Francisco Giants games in 1961, initially carrying road games against the Los Angeles Dodgers until 1965. KTVU's relationship with the Giants extended to the franchise's ownership, as Cox Enterprises owned a 10 percent stake in the Giants during the latter years of their contract. KTVU's rights were shared with NBC Sports Bay Area (then SportsChannel Bay Area) beginning in 1991; the Giants moved to KNTV in 2008. KTVU also carried Oakland Athletics games in 1973.

KTVU carried San Francisco/Golden State Warriors games from 1962 to 1963, 1965 to 1968, 1969 to 1983, and from the late 1990s to 2001. The station currently airs ancillary programming for the 49ers, including the KTVU Mercedes-Benz Sports Weekend on Saturdays, and 49ers Total Access and 49ers Pre Game Live on Sundays; the latter airs in lieu of Fox NFL Kickoff, which airs instead on KICU. Since 2015, KTVU has featured Sports Wrap on weekend evenings.

=== News operation ===
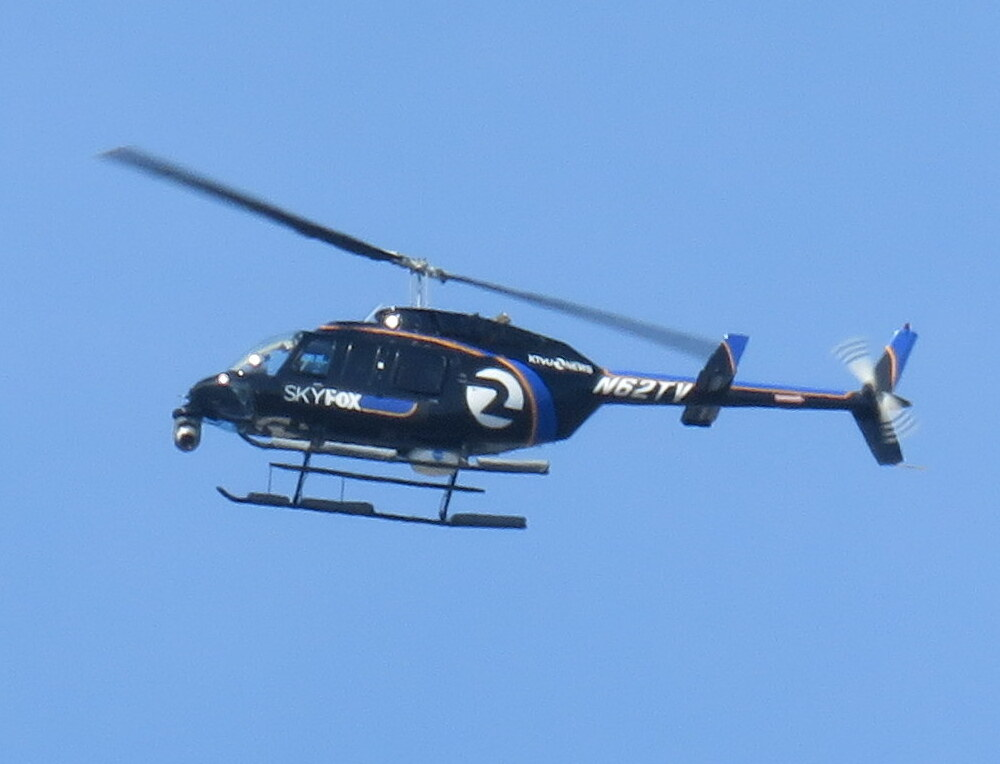
KTVU helicopter over San Francisco in 2021

KTVU's news department began operations along with the station on March 3, 1958, with the launch of The 10 O'Clock News. The program was originally anchored by KTVU managing editor Les Nichols and news director Al Helmso; Nichols and Helmso stepped down as main anchors in the early 1960s, replaced by Gary Park and Stan Atkinson. The program was reformatted in 1971 as The Tuck-Fortner Report, with Ron Fortner and Michael Tuck. Later anchors included Marcia Brandwynne and George Reading in 1974, and Atkinson and Judd Hambrick.

In 1976, assignment reporter Dennis Richmond became lead anchor, and became known among local viewers for his straightforward and interpersonal, but calm and unopinionated delivery in his reporting. Richmond's co-anchors were Judd Hambrick (1976–1977), Andy Park (1977–1978), Barbara Simpson (1978–1986), Elaine Corral (1986–1998), Leslie Griffith (1998–2006) and Julie Haener (2000–2008). Richmond anchored The Ten O'Clock News for 32 of his 40 years at KTVU until his retirement in May 2008. Replacing him was Frank Somerville, who had been an anchor for the station starting in 1992. Pat McCormick was a weathercaster for the station from 1969 until retiring in 1995 and was chief weathercaster from 1974 onward; successor Bill Martin joined Channel 2 in 1996. Bob MacKenzie was a fixture for many years as a feature reporter and commentator, winning 13 Bay Area Emmy Awards during his tenure at the station from 1978 to 2006. Fred Zehnder joined the station as assistant news director before being promoted to news director in 1978; Zehnder crafted a no-nonsense journalistic style for The 10 o'clock News largely devoid of "happy talk".

The station began morning news with Mornings on 2 on January 2, 1991, which expanded to three hours on September 14, 2015. An hour-long early-morning newscast launched in August 1996, followed by 6 p.m. news in March 2000 (KTVU previously had a 6 p.m. newscast from 1989 until 1991). After KRON and KPIX implemented early prime scheduling in February 1992, KTVU bested both stations' late-evening newscasts, which were moved up to 10 p.m.; KRON ended early prime in September 1993, while KPIX ended it in September 1998.

Besides beating out its competition in the 10 p.m. time slot, The Ten O'Clock News has also placed ahead of KRON, KPIX and KGO's 11 p.m. newscasts in overall late news viewership for much of its history; however, as its news programming expanded, KTVU's newscasts avidly competed for first overall with KRON-TV and KGO-TV during the 1990s. Its newscasts became the highest-rated in the Bay Area by the early 2000s. The May 1999 retirement of Zehnder brought changes to the newsroom; however, KTVU was ranked as the highest quality local newscast in the nation in 2000 by the Project for Excellence in Journalism under his immediate successor, Andrew Finlayson (who began his tenure at KTVU as a noon news producer in 1988 and left the station in 2003), while maintaining the top rating slot at 10 p.m. and throughout the noon and morning newscasts. Varying prime time numbers and improvements at competitors (as well as audience erosion for local programming in general) have since led to a decline in the once-dominant news operation's ratings, although it retains the No. 1 spot, a rarity for a Fox station. For August 2010, KTVU's newscasts ranked No. 1 among adult viewers 25–54, beating KPIX, KGO, KNTV, and KRON.

On October 10, 2006, KTVU became the first television station in the Bay Area to begin broadcasting its local newscasts in high definition.

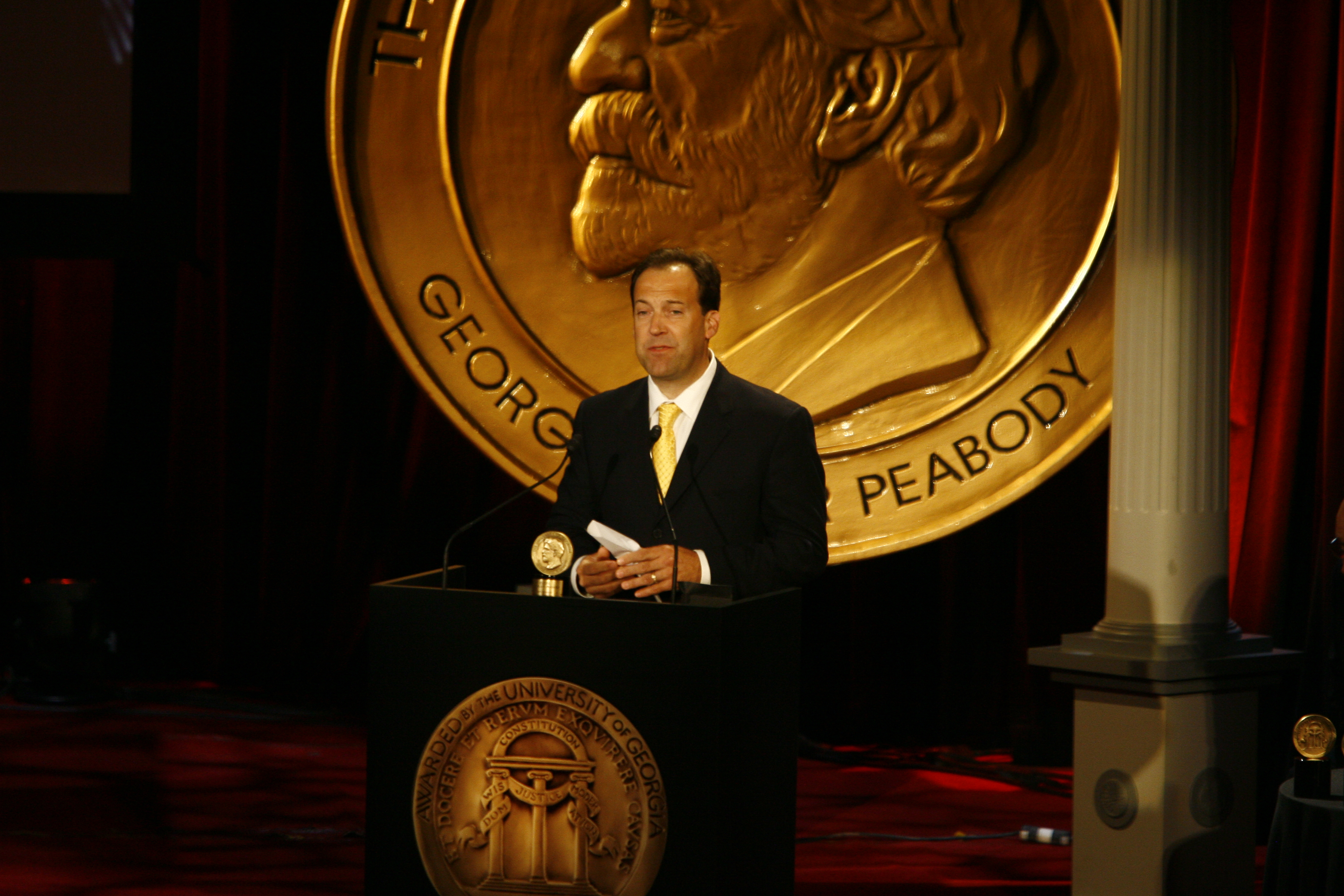
Former KTVU news director Ed Chapuis at the 69th Annual Peabody Awards in 2010

KTVU launched a 7 p.m. newscast for KICU-TV on January 21, 2008. In 2010, the KTVU news department was honored with a Peabody Award for its coverage of the January 2009 shooting of unarmed African-American male Oscar Grant in a Bay Area Rapid Transit (BART) terminal. By January 2011, KTVU launched weekend morning newscasts and extended the morning news to a start time of 4:30 a.m. KTVU's newscasts were also simulcast in other television markets. By 2014, newscasts aired on KRXI-TV in Reno, Nevada, KCBA in Monterey, KRVU-LD in Chico, and KEMY-LP in Eureka. KRXI ended the morning and noon simulcasts on May 14, 2014, and the 10 p.m. simulcast on July 31, 2023; KRVU/KEMY dropped the 10 p.m. simulcast on September 27, 2021, and KCBA dropped the morning and 10 p.m. simulcasts in January 2022.

During the station's coverage of Asiana Airlines Flight 214, on the noon newscast on July 12, 2013, anchor Tori Campbell read the names of four people purported to be the pilots, but were satirical names playing off Asian stereotypes—Captain Sum Ting Wong ("something wrong"), Wi Tu Lo ("we too low"), Ho Lee Fuk ("holy fuck"), (Note: Pronounced by Campbell on-air as "Ho Lee Fook" [ˈhəʊ ˌliː ˈfʊk].) and Bang Ding Ow—inadvertently vetted by a summer intern at the National Transportation Safety Board (NTSB). The NTSB apologized for its role in the incident, several KTVU staff were terminated immediately, and a news producer resigned. Asiana Airlines filed a defamation lawsuit against KTVU, but withdrew it a few days later. KTVU filed DMCA requests to remove user-uploaded videos of the newscast intended to lessen insensitivity towards the Asian community.

KTVU debuted an hour-long 4 p.m. newscast in June 2015; this followed an extension of Mornings on 2 to a 4 a.m. start. On April 17, 2017, KTVU debuted a half-hour newscast at 11 p.m.

Frank Somerville was taken off the air after a May 2021 newscast when he struggled to read the teleprompter and slurred his words. That September, he was suspended indefinitely after attempting to add personal commentary to a report on the disappearance of Gabrielle Petito alluding to "missing white woman syndrome". The station declined to renew his contract in January 2022, a month after he was arrested for driving under the influence.

== Notable former on-air staff ==
- Brian Copeland – feature reporter/meteorologist, 1994–1999
- Mark Curtis – anchor/reporter, 1993–2007
- Priya David Clemens – reporter, 2005–2008
- Ron Fortner – co-anchor of The Tuck and Fortner Report, early 1970s
- Leslie Griffith – anchor/reporter, 1986–2006
- Lloyd LaCuesta – reporter, 1977–2012
- Pat McCormick – meteorologist and host of Dialing for Dollars and children's show Charlie and Humphrey (1968–1995)
- Byron Miranda – meteorologist, 2006
- Steve Physioc – sports director, 1987–1989
- Dennis Richmond – anchor/reporter, 1976–2008
- Ted Rowlands – anchor/reporter, 2001–2004 and 2016–2017
- Don Sherwood – talk show host, 1950s
- Sara Sidner – anchor/reporter, 2004–2007
- Barbara Simpson – anchor, 1978–1986
- Frank Somerville – anchor, 1992–2021
- Michael Tuck – co-anchor of The Tuck and Fortner Report, 1970–1974
- Thuy Vu – anchor/reporter, 1998–2000
- Bob Wilkins – original host of Creature Features, 1971–1979

== Technical information ==
=== Subchannels ===
The station's signal is multiplexed:

Subchannels of KTVU
Subchannel	Res.	Short name	Programming
2.1	720p	KTVU-HD	Fox
2.2	480i	FOXWX	Fox Weather
2.3	480i	MOVIES!	Movies!
2.4	480i	BUZZR	Buzzr
4.1	720p	KRON-TV	The CW (KRON-TV)

Broadcast on behalf of another station

=== Analog-to-digital conversion ===
KTVU shut down its analog signal, over VHF channel 2, on June 12, 2009, as part of the federally mandated transition from analog to digital television. The station's digital signal was relocated from its pre-transition UHF channel 56, to UHF channel 44, using virtual channel 2. KTVU relocated from UHF channel 44 to UHF channel 31 in March 2020.

=== Translators ===
KTVU operates a digital fill-in translator on UHF channel 26. The station was previously rebroadcast over translator K25QJ-D, licensed to Ukiah.

Translator of KTVU
Call sign	City of license	Channel	ERP	HAAT	Facility ID	Transmitter coordinates
KTVU (DRT)	San Jose	26	2.15 kW	871 m (2,858 ft)	35703	37°29′17.0″N 121°52′3.0″W
