= Dennis Richmond =

American news anchor (1943–2025)

- Born: May 26, 1943; Rossford, Ohio, U.S.
- Died: February 5, 2025 (aged 81); Grass Valley, California, U.S.
- Education: Wayne State University; Columbia University
- Occupation: News anchor
- Years active: 1968–2008
- Employer: KTVU

Dennis Richmond (May 26, 1943 – February 5, 2025) was an American news anchor who spent 40 years with Oakland, California-based KTVU.

== Biography ==
=== Early life ===
Richmond was born in Toledo, Ohio, and raised in Rossford, Ohio, a village in the Toledo area. He graduated from Rossford High School in 1961. He served in the United States Army from 1961 to 1964 with the 82nd Airborne Division. He attended Wayne State University in Detroit from 1965 to 1967. He then attended Columbia University Graduate School of Journalism in 1969 on a scholarship which he was offered while working at KTVU.

=== Career ===
Richmond joined KTVU on April 23, 1968, as a clerk typist, and became anchor in 1976—one of the first African-Americans to become chief anchor of a major-market TV newscast. He co-anchored alongside Barbara Simpson from 1978 to 1986. Elaine Corral served as co-anchor from 1986 to 1998, followed by Leslie Griffith through 2006. His last co-anchor was Julie Haener. During his career he and his wife settled in San Ramon, California.

After forty years with KTVU—thirty-one as anchor—Richmond retired on May 26, 2008, his 65th birthday. By the time of his retirement, Richmond had become the highly respected "dean" of Bay Area TV news anchors, the longest-serving anchor in the Bay Area's history. His final show garnered 400,000 viewers, giving the newscast a 15.6 Nielsen rating and making him "more popular than Oprah". He had one daughter from a previous relationship and two grandchildren.

Frank Somerville, a longtime anchor for KTVU's morning and afternoon newscasts, succeeded Richmond as anchor of the 10 O'Clock News.

=== Personal life and death ===
Dennis Richmond was a native of the area of Toledo, Ohio, and served in the United States Army for three years. He gambled on driving to California where he had relatives; he later found employment with KTVU as a typist and never left.

Richmond was a member of the board of directors of the Child Abuse Consortium, which is a California statewide government agency. He served as the General Chairperson of the YMCA fundraising drive for Alameda County. He also served in the Oakland Mayor's Blue Ribbon Committee to Save High School Sports.

During Richmond's years as a news anchor, his wife operated a salon and Spa. Richmond was living in Grass Valley, California with his wife Deborah when he died on February 5, 2025, at the age of 81. His wife told a member of KTVU that he suffered a heart attack and a fall weeks before.

=== Awards ===
Richmond won several awards, including the Humanitarian Award of Oakland (the highest honor given in that city) and the Black Media Coalition Journalist of the Year Award.

Richmond also received an Award of Distinction from Rossford High School, as a distinguished graduate.
