= Leslie Griffith =

American journalist (1956–2022)

Leslie Ray Griffith
- Born: January 1, 1956; Tomball, Texas, U.S.
- Died: August 10, 2022 (aged 66); Lake Chapala, Mexico
- Occupation: News anchor
- Years active: 1984–2006
- Employer: KTVU

Leslie Ray Griffith (January 1, 1956 – August 10, 2022) was an American writer and journalist. She worked for 22 years at KTVU in the San Francisco Bay Area as a reporter and as a news anchor.

== Early life ==
Born in Tomball, Texas, Griffith worked her way through college as a single mother, working as a cleaner.

== Career ==
She began her career in the newspaper business as a journalist for the Associated Press and the Denver Post. Her first television jobs were in Grand Junction, Colorado, and in the Monterey-Salinas market of California. In 1986 she became a weekend reporter and anchor at KTVU in Oakland, California; in March 1998 she became co-anchor of the Ten O'Clock News with Dennis Richmond. For nine years she was sole anchor of the weekend news; on her 25th birthday, she was in Moscow reporting on the Cold War. She resigned from the station in 2006, after 22 years.

She continued to write for news publications, including The Huffington Post and the San Francisco Chronicle

For many years, she was concerned with the problem of tuberculosis in circus elephants. She published an article on the issue in 2007 and later wrote and directed the award-winning documentary, When Giants Fall.

In 2005, she established the Leslie R. Griffith Woman of Courage Scholarship to help young women.

She had a small part as a TV anchor in the 1999 film True Crime.

== Personal life and death ==
Griffith and her first husband divorced after two years of marriage. She had two daughters and a son. She died on August 10, 2022, in Lake Chapala, Mexico, from the effects of Lyme disease, which she had contracted in 2015; she moved to Mexico in 2016.

== Awards ==
- Casey Award for "Candy Kids" with Roland De Wolk at KTVU, 1998.
- Emmy for Election Night coverage with KTVU News, 2001.
- Emmy for "My 20th Century: The Battle for California" for KTVU, 2001.
- Emmy for On Camera News Anchor, 2002.
- Emmy for "Lost Children of Romania" with KTVU, 2003.
- Genesis Award for KTVU's Ten O'Clock News "Circus Elephants" feature on the treatment of circus elephants at the Ringling Bros. and Barnum & Bailey Circus, 2004.
- APTRA Award for Best Anchor, 2005.
