= Pat McCormack =

Pat McCormack may refer to:

- Pat McCormack (boxer, born 1946)
- Pat McCormack (boxer, born 1995)

== See also ==
- Pat McCormick (disambiguation)
- Patty McCormack (born 1945), stage, film and television actress
