= Priya David Clemens =

American journalist

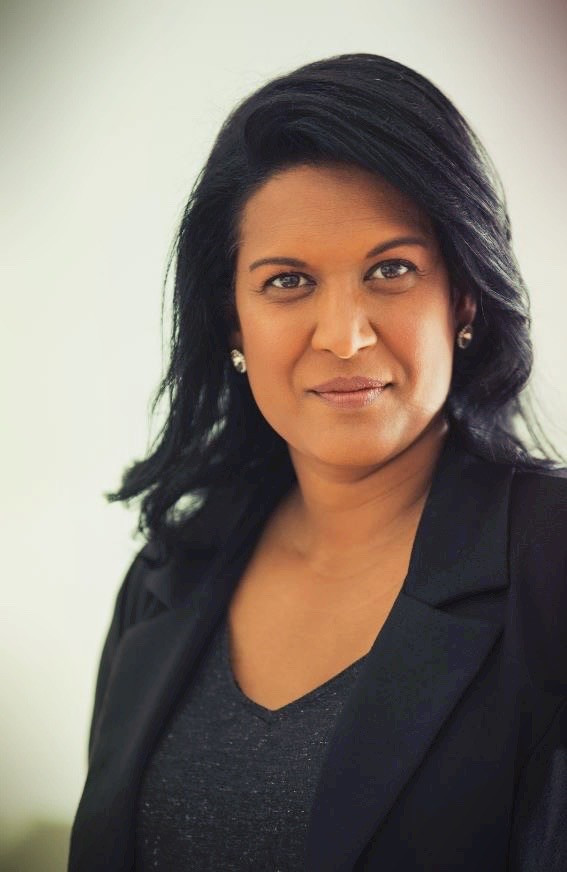
- Born: Priya David; December 23, 1974 (age 51); Madras (now Chennai), India
- Education: University of Southern California
- Occupations: Journalist, news presenter
- Notable credit(s): KQED Newsroom (2020–2023); CBS Evening News (2008–2012); The Early Show (2008–2012); The Early Show Saturday Edition (2008–2012); KTVU (2005–07, 2010)
- Spouse: Alex Clemens

Priya David Clemens (born December 23, 1974) is an American journalist based in San Francisco.

== Early life and education ==
Clemens was born Priya David in Madras (now Chennai), India. She grew up in Virginia, California, Brussels and London, where her father worked for an American company that worked with NATO.

Clemens graduated with honors from Westmont College in 1997, with a bachelor's degree in anthropology and with a master's degree in broadcast journalism from University of Southern California in 2002.

== Career ==
Clemens was the host of KQED Newsroom until June 23, 2023 (the series finale of the program). Most recently, she was the spokesperson for the Golden Gate Bridge District, handling communications, media and policy for the Golden Gate Bridge, Golden Gate Ferry, and Golden Gate Transit bus system.

Clemens has worked as a CBS News correspondent based in New York City, reporting for the CBS Evening News and for The Early Show, and filling in as an occasional Saturday and Sunday CBS Evening News anchor. In 2008 and 2009, during the international sub-prime crisis, Clemens regularly reported on financial issues from the floor of the New York Stock Exchange.

She worked for KTVU in the San Francisco Bay Area, as a reporter for Mornings on 2 and other news shows, and for MSNBC as an embedded presidential campaign reporter in 2004 - covering Dick Gephardt's presidential campaign and Dick Cheney's re-election bid. Clemens was employed as an anchor for KOIN, the CBS affiliate in Portland, Oregon. She hosted Keep It Local, a daily, hour-long news show shot live at various locations in Oregon, and filled in as an anchor on KOIN's various news shows.

== Personal life ==
In September 2011, she and her family were subjected to an armed raid of their Alameda, California home, by the Martinez Police Department, the FBI, and the Alameda Police Department. The law enforcement officials had a search warrant for the previous owners of the home, who had moved out nearly three months earlier when David and her husband Alex Clemens purchased the home.
