= Frank Somerville =

American journalist

- Born: Frank Somerville; March 19, 1958 (age 68); San Luis Obispo, California, U.S.
- Education: San Francisco State University
- Occupations: Journalist and news anchor
- Years active: 1991–present
- Television: KTVU (1991–2021)

Frank Somerville (born March 19, 1958) is an American television journalist. During his three decades at KTVU in Oakland, California, Somerville received three Emmy Awards, including one for best on-camera news anchor.

== Early life and education ==
Somerville was born on March 19, 1958, in San Luis Obispo, California, but was raised in Berkeley. He was named after his father's childhood friend, Frank Patty, and his paternal grandfather, William Somerville. He attended Berkeley High School, graduating in 1976. He then attended San Francisco State University.

== Broadcast career ==
Somerville was an intern at KTVU in 1981, while attending San Francisco State. After graduation he worked at local stations in Santa Rosa, California; Minneapolis, Minnesota; and Providence, Rhode Island, before returning to the San Francisco Bay Area. He became co-anchor of KTVU's morning news program in 1992 and was the first anchor of the 5 p.m. newscast when it launched in 2005. In 2008, he was named co-anchor of the 6 p.m. and 10 p.m. newscasts, replacing 40-year veteran Dennis Richmond.

In 2013, Somerville apologized on behalf of KTVU for an incident in which racist pilot names were read out in a broadcast on Asiana Airlines Flight 214.

In June 2021, Somerville took a personal leave of absence from KTVU following an on-air incident during which he struggled to read the script for several stories and appeared to slur his words. He returned to the anchor chair on August 4 without addressing the incident that saw his brief departure. In September 2021, he was suspended for disobedience after seeking to keep a "tag" concerning domestic violence and "missing white woman syndrome" in a story on the Gabby Petito case. In November 2021, he said in an interview with the Bay Area News Group that KTVU had not contacted him and that "All indications are that I’m never going to anchor at Channel 2 again."

Somerville's suspension from KTVU would become permanent in January 2022 when his contract expired and KTVU would decide not to re-sign him. He believes that his automotive collision that happened the month before did not play a role; instead, he believes management had already decided to cut him loose months earlier.

In December 2022, Somerville went public about his dismissal from the station on a Facebook post.

== Personal life ==
Somerville was married to television producer Donna Wright Somerville for more than 20 years; the couple has two daughters. A picture of him styling his Black, adopted daughter's hair went viral on the Internet.

Somerville has been a vegetarian since the age of 12. He works out and practices the Israeli martial art of Krav Maga.

=== Legal issues ===
On December 30, 2021, Somerville was arrested on suspicion of driving under the influence after an automobile collision.

In June 2023, Somerville was arrested twice in one day for alcohol-related issues.

In September 2025, Somerville was arrested following a physical altercation with his daughter.

== See also ==
- List of vegetarians
