= Ron Fortner =

American journalist (1941–2003)

Ronnie Fortner (October 12, 1941 – February 7, 2003) was an American radio and television anchor.

== Early life ==
Fortner was born in Poteau, Oklahoma.

== Career ==
Fortner spent more than thirty years as a broadcaster, working alongside veteran California newscaster Michael Tuck both in San Diego and San Francisco. Immediately after Fortner's death from cancer, Tuck took it upon himself to help raise college and support funds for his son, 13-year-old Blaise Alejandro Fortner. According to Tuck, "Ron had hit on hard times over the past few years and I wanted to do something to help. He was a terrific guy, professionally and personally."

Fortner's work in the San Diego TV market included stints at XETV-TV Channel 6 during that station's initial attempts at creating a news department. He later moved to KNSD-39 and had a talk radio show during that time at KSDO (AM). In the early 1970s he and Tuck anchored The Tuck and Fortner Report on San Francisco's KTVU-2.

Upon his move to Palm Springs, Fortner concentrated on radio as the conservative host of The Ron Fortner Show originally carried on KNWZ (AM). Poor ratings meant a move to KESQ (AM) Palm Desert. After that station's sale, Fortner moved one final time to KGAM (AM) Palm Springs. While at KNWZ, Fortner was host of a national show bearing his name on the Talk Radio Network.

== Personal ==
Ron was profiled on a number of media outlets about emerging rejuvenation clinics and therapy, it isn't clear if the testosterone injections contributed to his health issues or cancer growth.
