= Pat McCormick (television personality) =

American television personality

Pat McCormick (born c. 1933) is a retired American local television personality and puppeteer who worked for San Francisco's KGO-TV, and Oakland's KTVU channel 2, where among many jobs he was the nightly news' weatherman, hosted the midday movie Dialing for Dollars program, and co-hosted the local edition of the Jerry Lewis Labor Day Telethon.

== "Charley and Humphrey" ==
McCormick was raised in the southern Oregon town of Myrtle Creek. While working at ABC-TV in Los Angeles, McCormick pitched a children's program to a CBS affiliate in Fresno, California, and went on the air there in Spring 1959 with Charley (inspired by Dennis Weaver's character Chester on Gunsmoke) and his sidekick Humphrey. Charley was a horse who wore a sea captain's hat, and Humphrey Hambone was a bulldog. In time, he'd added additional characters, "Sneezer," "Shagnasty Bear," and "Pussyfoot", the grand piano playing cat wearing sunglasses. The characters followed McCormick when he signed with San Francisco's KGO-TV in 1961, and finally to KTVU where they starred in "The Charley and Humphrey Show" from 1972 to 1976 and they became a staple in afternoon PSAs. Humphrey eventually wore a trademark Oakland Raiders sweater sent to McCormick by Sonny Barger of the Oakland Hells Angels.

In a 2008 interview, McCormick admitted that the "Charley and Humphrey" skits were his favorite aspect of working on television: "All the other things I did on television were just jobs. It was my work. By contrast Charley and Humphrey were my passion. They were me. I miss working with them more than I can describe."

In 2021, it was announced a comic book series based on the characters will be published by new publisher Acme Ink in January 2022.

=== Some "Charley and Humphrey" episodes ===
- Bees
- Boating Safety
- Borrowing Without Asking
- Think For Yourself
- Park
- Exercise
- Interruption
- Hostility
- Kitten
- Library

== Dialing for Dollars ==
McCormick also hosted a show in the 1970s called Dialing for Dollars where random Bay Area people were called and asked to guess the "Count and the Amount". The "count" was used to determine which person would be called. The host would pick a slip of paper from a drum containing pages from local phone books sliced into convenient sizes. At the beginning of the show, the count was determined by spinning two wheels, one of which resulted in a number and the other in "top" or "bottom". If the count was, for instance, 3/top, the host would start at the top of the slip of phone book and count three numbers down from the top and call the resulting number. The "amount" was the amount of money to be won. It would start at $100 and increase by a fixed amount with every unsuccessful call. The calls were made during commercial breaks while the afternoon movie was being screened.

== Personal life ==
After his retirement, McCormick settled in Gold Beach, Oregon.
