= Afternoon movie =

Afternoon airing of films on television

The afternoon movie was a popular practice of local television stations in North America from the 1950s through the 1970s. It consisted of the daily weekday showing of old films usually between 12:30 and 2:00 p.m.; if the film ran two hours or more, it was split into two parts. Atlanta local station WSB-TV, for example, would show films in this time slot under the umbrella title Armchair Playhouse.

Popular titles, such as the 1953 House of Wax, The Beast from 20,000 Fathoms (also 1953), the 1935 Mutiny on the Bounty, the 1949 The Secret Garden, or National Velvet (1944), would often turn up as afternoon movies. During the Christmas season, such films as Gulliver's Travels (1939), Hansel and Gretel: An Opera Fantasy (1954), or A Christmas Carol (1938) would sometimes be telecast on local stations after the network telecast of the Macy's Thanksgiving Day parade.

These afternoon movie telecasts existed in an age where was no cable TV, home video, or video-on-demand. Viewers either had to watch an old film when it was telecast, or wait for it to be shown at a revival house.

WABC-TV in New York City ran The 4:30 Movie weekdays from 1968 to 1981. Other ABC owned-and-operated stations also used the format at different times in the afternoon.

Some local stations also telecast 'morning movies' in much the same format; these were often shown from 9:30 a.m. to 11:00 a.m., and like the afternoon films, would often be split up into two parts. Obscure B-films often turned up as morning movies, though occasionally a "big film" such as The Miracle of the Bells would be telecast.

As more and more films began to be televised by TV networks in prime time, and as more and more soap operas, talk shows, and daily syndicated programming filled the network airwaves and became popular, the daily afternoon movie on TV was phased out by the three major commercial networks (NBC, CBS and ABC). Ted Turner's WTBS-TV on the other hand, showed old films such as the 1960 Little Shop of Horrors and the edited version of Joan of Arc both in morning and in the afternoon slots throughout the 1970s.
