= 1989 Loma Prieta earthquake in popular culture =

The 1989 Loma Prieta earthquake is featured in films and television shows.

== Films and TV shows ==
- The events in the TV sitcom Full House episode "Aftershocks" (December 8, 1989) take place following the Loma Prieta earthquake; it centers on 7-year-old Stephanie Tanner developing separation anxiety towards her father Danny because he came home late at night when the earthquake occurred and she feared he had perished in it.
- After the Shock (1990), a made-for-TV movie that was aired on the USA Network, with stories of rescue after the disaster.
- Miracle on Interstate 880 (1993), a TV movie fictionalization and re-enactment of events at the collapsed Cypress Structure.
- Journeyman (2007), TV show on NBC in which the main character travels back in time to save a person who died during the earthquake. Occurs in the third episode, "Game Three," in reference to the 1989 World Series.
- Midnight Caller (1990), TV show set in San Francisco in the aftermath of the earthquake. In the show, a caller jokes about Candlestick Park being renamed "Wiggly Field".
- Medium (2005), TV show on NBC in which a character uses her coincidental presence in Oakland during the earthquake as an opportunity to fake her own death and disappear. Occurs in the episode "Sweet Dreams".
- Fringe (2008), TV show on Fox in which a character's parents are killed in the Oakland Bay Bridge collapse, while the Observer is watching her and her parents. Occurs in the episode "August". In a later episode ("Amber 31422", November 4, 2010), the alternate Walter Bishop refers to October 17, 1989, as the first time he used his amber-based protocol to heal breaches between the two universes.
- The Grateful Dead performed the Rodney Crowell song "California Earthquake" at their concert in Philadelphia, Pennsylvania, on October 20, 1989, then again three nights later in Charlotte, North Carolina – the only times the band ever performed the song. On December 6, 1989, the band played an earthquake benefit concert at the Oakland-Alameda County Coliseum Arena.
- Gillian Welch in the song "Wrecking Ball" on her Soul Journey album.
- The 2004 video game Grand Theft Auto: San Andreas takes place in 1992. In it, fictional San Fierro, the game's version of San Francisco, has a few quake-damaged areas courtesy of a major shaker occurring three years before the game begins, and another earthquake being the reason the player is locked from visiting San Fierro and Las Venturas in early parts of the game. One location includes a damaged overpass resembling the collapsed Cypress Street Viaduct.
- Faultline.mov – An unlisted 2022 YouTube video from Kane Pixels' Backrooms analog horror series that details the events following the earthquake. In the video, the earthquake occurs at the same time as a scientific experiment conducted by the fictional Async research institute.
- Episode 6, Season 1 of the 2022 revival of Quantum Leap takes place during the earthquake.

== Documentaries ==
Some earthquake and disaster-themed television documentaries that feature the earthquake include:

- The Quake of 89: The Final Warning? – a 12th episode of the 26th series of the BBC television documentary programme Horizon, broadcast on April 2, 1990.
- Nature's Fury – produced by National Geographic in 1994 .
- Earth's Fury (also known as Anatomy of Disaster outside the United States) – produced by GRB Entertainment and aired on television networks around the world such as The Learning Channel in the United States, feature the earthquake.
- Raging Planet – aired on Discovery Channel in 1997, features the earthquake.
- Mega Disaster – produced by NHNZ and aired internationally on National Geographic Channel in 2006.
- Surviving Disaster – aired on the BBC in the United Kingdom features the earthquake.
- World's Deadliest Earthquakes – aired on ABC television network in 1999 features the earthquake.
- Minute by Minute – aired on A&E in 2002, features the earthquake.
- Critical Rescue – aired on Discovery Channel in 2003, features the rescuers of the earthquake.
- San Francisco Quake: A Matter of Seconds – aired on TLC in 1999, a special focus on the earthquake.
- Loma Prieta Earthquake, 30 Years Later – aired on NBC owned-and-operated television station KNTV in San Francisco Bay Area for its 30th anniversary in 2019.
- The Day the Series Stopped – 2014 documentary film from ESPN's 30 for 30 series that focuses on the disruption of the 1989 World Series by the earthquake.
- I Alive – The first episode of the series, broadcast in 2019 by Cottage Life Network, titled "San Francisco Freeway Collapse" that focuses on the collapse of the Cypress Street Viaduct during the earthquake.

== Literature ==
- The graphic novel Smile by Raina Telgemeier features her account of how the earthquake felt, as well as the aftermath of it.

== Music ==
There is a California based hardcore punk band named Loma Prieta.
