= Barbara Simpson =

American broadcaster

Barbara Allan Simpson (born July 29, 1937) is an American retired TV reporter, news anchor, and conservative radio talk show host.

== Early life and education ==
Simpson was born Barbara Allan in New York City and raised in Ocean County, New Jersey. Her parents were Rose (née Colletta), of Italian descent, and John Allan (surname anglicized), a Croatian immigrant. She has a brother, Henry Allan.

She graduated from Georgian Court College with a Bachelor of Science degree in 1958 and later earned a Master of Arts degree from Michigan State University.

== Career ==
=== Academic ===
Simpson was an assistant professor and chair of the textiles and clothing department at Mount St. Mary's College in Los Angeles and was on the faculty of a similar department at Michigan State University.

== Personal ==
Simpson is an experienced markswoman. A Roman Catholic, she lives in Moraga, California. She has two daughters, Elizabeth Zubkoff and Patricia Simpson.
