= The Mikey Show =

American radio program

- Genre: Alternative music afternoon drive program
- Home station: The Drive 101.7 & AM 830
- Syndicates: local show only
- Hosted by: Mikey Esparza
- Recording studio: The KFMB Station Studios.
- Original release: 2017
- Audio format: FM Stereo
- Website: mikeyshow.com

The Mikey Show is an afternoon drive program currently airing in Tucson, AZ. It recently was on hiatus from 2012 to 2017.

Prior to its reboot, it was a controversial shock jock morning drive program syndicated across the Southwest.

== History ==
The Mikey Show earned its name from show host Mikey Esparza. He worked in radio his entire adult life all over the country, from Rochester, New York; to Dallas, Texas.

The Mikey Show was once syndicated, having aired on KSJO in San Jose and KEGL in Dallas, Texas but was let go from both stations after creating a controversial parody song. Esparza did the evening slot on KIOZ from 7:00 p.m. to 12:00 am from the late 1990s until 2004, broadcasting to both San Jose and Dallas via satellite. His stint in the evening slot ended a week after he started broadcasting the morning drive in early 2004 and was fired for a stint he did about kidnapping victim Erica Pratt. His return to San Diego came on the heels of Howard Stern’s departure for satellite radio where he quickly established a loyal fan base known as the “P-1s” (Priority One) and became the highest rated morning show in San Diego. The show aired on KIOZ until late December 2009 when it was announced that Esparza would not be given a chance to renew his contract. His former cast remained at KIOZ to and continued their own show now entitled The Show on January 4, 2010.

On January 12, 2010, it was announced on mikeyshow.com that The Mikey Show moved to 94.9. The Mikey Show debuted live on February 1, 2010.

On March 7, 2012, it was announced that The Mikey Show was no longer on 94.9. FM 94/9's senior V.P. and general manager Rick Jackson announced March 7 at 8:00 a.m. via a taped statement that its morning-talk Mikey Show would no longer be a part of the station's morning drive-time lineup.

On March 9, 2016, Jay Isbell stated on his podcast that there were hurt feelings behind the scenes on the Mikey Show while it was on the air. These feelings divide Lauren and Woods from working with Mikey at this time.

On July 24, 2017, it was announced that The Mikey Show would be airing on the afternoon drive on San Diego's KFMB 100.7.

In July 2019, it was announced that Mikey and KFMB were parting ways. It was later noted that Mikey's contract was not renewed by the station.

On August 5, 2019, Mikey announced that he was moving to Tucson, AZ and would be doing the drive-time broadcast for a new radio station, The Drive 101.7.

== Controversy ==
The Mikey Show was criticized for its potential to harm children, some going as far as charging that it engages in the "sexual exploitation of children to gain an audience." The Mikey Show set off a storm of criticism when, in 2004, Esparza jokingly gave kidnapping tips to listeners following the kidnapping and subsequent escape of 7-year-old Erica Pratt. The station initially suspended Esparza for one week over the gag; he later returned to the air and apologized. Esparza has also been criticed for simulating marijuana smoking on the air and producing a parody song about artist R. Kelly's legal troubles, specifically being accused of statutory rape.

After returning to San Diego, Esparza increasingly incorporated his Christian faith into the show, with billboard advertising highlighting his Christian identity. Esparza often spoke of his love for Jesus and spoke openly about his past problems with substance abuse.

== KBZT Cast Members ==
The new show on FM94/9 San Diego's KBZT had a cast of four: Mike Esparza (Host), Steven Woods (Sports), Jay Isbell (Producer), and Lauren O'Brien (Assistant Producer). On July 13, 2011 KBZT conducted mass layoffs which included Mikey Show News girl Sienna Feerrar

Mikey was in radio for over 20 years. In December 2009 after a very controversial breakup of his former show, Mike was left to build a whole new team on his own.

Steven Woods and Mikey crossed paths when Mikey was in Dallas on the Eagle. Woods and Baumann were two characters often on KIOZ's Mikey Show that Eddie and Mikey did the voices for. Baumann was an older gentleman always trying to teach "The Kid" (Woods) some class about high priced suits, expensive cars and proper etiquette.

Jay is a former employee of Clear Channel Communications. He was the promotions director until January 2009 when Clear Channel had a massive budget cut and laid off 9% of their staff, Jay was part of that 9%. From there Jay went on to create his own promotions company, named Isbell Production. He was hired to do the 28hr show 2009 for KIOZ's Mikey Show.

Lauren is a stand-up comedian and was discovered by Mikey when he found her on YouTube. She offers a lot of character voices and has a dry, sarcastic sense of humor.

== KIOZ Cast Members ==
When the Mikey Show aired on San Diego's KIOZ it had a cast of five: Mikey, "Boston" Rob, Eddie, Ashlee, and Sky. Up until early 2009 the show had a sixth cast member by the name of Sean, he was laid off by Clear Channel due to budget cuts.

No immediate information was given as to the cause of the layoffs.

Professional American Football Player Jeff Garcia went to high school with Mike. Jeff appeared (via telephone) on the show. Mikey attributed Jeff's success to Mikey's bench-warming, and Jeff in turn mentioned that Mikey was busy watching the girls. Jeff also acknowledged that Mikey was "DJing back then, telling it like it is!"
