= KIOZ =

Active rock radio station in San Diego

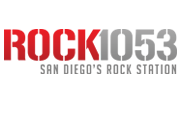
- San Diego, California; United States
- Broadcast area: Greater San Diego
- Frequency: 105.3 MHz (HD Radio)
- Branding: Rock 105.3

Programming
- Language: English
- Format: Active rock
- Subchannels: HD2: TikTok Radio
- Affiliations: Compass Media Networks

Ownership
- Owner: iHeartMedia, Inc.; (iHM Licenses, LLC)
- Sister stations: KGB, KGB-FM, KHTS-FM, KLSD, KMYI, KOGO, KSSX

History
- First air date: 1954
- Former call signs: KSON-FM (1955–1957); KPAY (1957); KDFR (1957–1958); KITT (1958–1981); KCBQ-FM (1981–1996)
- Call sign meaning: "IOZ" looks like "102"; original frequency was 102.1 FM, now KLVJ

Technical information
- Licensing authority: FCC
- Facility ID: 13504
- Class: B
- ERP: 26,000 watts
- HAAT: 210 meters (690 ft)
- Transmitter coordinates: 32.838944°N 117.249750°W

Links
- Public license information: Public file; LMS
- Webcast: Listen live (via iHeartRadio)
- Website: rock1053.iheart.com

KIOZ (105.3 FM, "Rock 105.3") is a commercial radio station licensed to San Diego, California, United States. Owned by iHeartMedia, Inc., it broadcasts an active rock format. KIOZ's studios are located in San Diego's Serra Mesa neighborhood on the northeast side, and the transmitter is located in La Jolla.

== History ==
=== Early years ===
The station at 105.3 FM went on the air in 1954 as KSON-FM, co-owned with KSON (AM). It broadcast initially on 101.5 MHz and moved to 104.7 MHz at the end of 1954. The station changed call letters twice in 1957; the second call sign, KDFR, reflected its ownership by Dorothy and C. Fredric Rabell.

In March 1958, the newly renamed KITT, a beautiful music-formatted station, began broadcasting on 105.3 MHz. The transmitter was located in downtown San Diego atop the Bank of America building. The station struggled financially for many years; the station was perpetually for sale, at one point for as low as $100,000. KITT was airing an Adult Contemporary format in 1978 when it went off the air due to transmitter problems, and remained so for more than a year.

When KITT returned to the air in March 1979, it adopted a Disco format. "K105" as it was branded, debuted in the April/May 1979 ratings with a 4.2 share, though the numbers quickly receded.

=== KCBQ-FM (1981–1996) ===
In 1981, KITT was bought by the owners of KCBQ and began simulcasting its new AM counterpart as KCBQ-FM. The station changed formats many times. First, following the end of the simulcast, KCBQ-FM signed on as "KCBQ Country" to compete with KSON-FM (97.3 FM). When that effort failed, it became "The Eagle", another flop.

KCBQ-FM eventually found success as an oldies station. Owner Compass Media proceeded to rehire former program director Rich Brother Robbin, who adjusted the format to "modern oldies". In October 1995, Compass sold six stations, including KCBQ-AM-FM, to Par Broadcasting for $68 million.

=== KIOZ — "Rock 105.3" (1996–present) ===
On April 1, 1996 at midnight, KCBQ-FM swapped frequencies with KIOZ, transferring the latter station's call letters and active rock format from 102.1 FM (IOZ resembles the number 102) to 105.3 FM. Meanwhile, KCBQ's call sign was dropped in favor of a new identity: KXST, for "Sets FM", with an adult album alternative (AAA) format. In October 1996, just one year after purchasing KIOZ, Par Broadcasting sold its four-station San Diego cluster to Jacor Communications for $72 million, part of a complex four-way swap of stations throughout California.

The new "Rock 105.3" thrived under Jacor. KIOZ aired the syndicated program The Howard Stern Show weekday mornings after it was pulled from Mexican radio station XETRA-FM. Shannon Leader was on-air middays, B.C. and Woody hosted afternoon drive, Mikey Esparza (later of The Mikey Show) was on evenings, and Mark The Shark hosted the overnight slot. It also had controversial moments, such as the "head up your ass" billboard of the late 1990s.

In 2004, The Mikey Show replaced Howard Stern on the KIOZ lineup. This change resulted from Clear Channel Communications (now iHeartMedia), which purchased Jacor, canceling Stern's morning show from the six Clear Channel-owned stations that carried it, owing to the "Nipplegate incident at Super Bowl XXXVIII. (Stern would move to KPLN that summer, then ultimately off terrestrial radio altogether — and thus outside FCC indecency regulation — when he moved to Sirius Satellite Radio in January 2006.) The Mikey Show itself left KIOZ in 2010 when Esparza moved to KBZT.

KIOZ was the flagship station of the San Diego Chargers football team from 2005 until their relocation after the 2016 NFL season. Staffing the microphones for pre-game shows were Eddie "The Oracle" Pappani (from KIOZ morning drive program The Show), and former NFL players Lew Bush and Jim Laslavic of San Diego's KNSD.

Replacing The Mikey Show in morning drive is a program known simply as The Show, which debuted on January 4, 2010. The show has a cast of four: Eddie, Sky, Thor and Emily. Costa, as he is referred to on-air, left the program in August 2012. After 13 years, Ashlee left on September 5, 2017. Emily, the newest member of The Show, joined on January 2, 2018.
