= California Council on Criminal Justice =

American government agency

The California Council on Criminal Justice (CCCJ) is an entity of the government of California that acts as the supervisory board concerning federal grants by the Office of Justice Programs (OJP) and an advisory board for other requirements of the Omnibus Crime Control and Safe Streets Act of 1968 and the Juvenile Delinquency Prevention and Control Act of 1968. It was created by the Deukmejian-Moretti Act of 1967.

The current chair is Sacramento County District Attorney Jan Scully. A notable council chair was Mike Carona, former Sheriff-Coroner of Orange County convicted of witness tampering.

== Organization ==
=== Office of Criminal Justice Planning ===
Previously there existed the subordinate Office of Criminal Justice Planning (OCJP) from 1997 to 2003 which largely controlled the functions of the council, but the CCCJ's functions were transferred to the California Office of Emergency Services (OES) in 2003. Since 2003–04, the OES Law Enforcement and Victim Services (LEVS) division has administered criminal justice grant programs formerly managed by the Office of Criminal Justice Planning, but due to weaknesses in the OCJP’s accounting records, OES encountered a number of serious problems, including the inability to match expenditures with grant amounts and violations of federal grant management requirements, and as a result the federal government froze its grant monies for a time (several federal grants remain frozen).

The statutory requirements of the OCJP, and hence the OES, are to:

- Develop with the advice and approval of the council, the comprehensive statewide plan for the improvement of criminal justice and delinquency prevention activity throughout the state.
- Define, develop and correlate programs and projects for the state criminal justice agencies.
- Receive and disburse federal funds, perform all necessary and appropriate staff services required by the council, and otherwise assist the council in the performance of its duties as established by federal acts.
- Develop comprehensive, unified and orderly procedures to insure that all local plans and all state and local projects are in accord with the comprehensive state plan, and that all applications for grants are processed efficiently.
- Cooperate with and render technical assistance to the Legislature, state agencies, units of general local government, combinations of those units, or other public or private agencies, organizations or institutions in matters relating to criminal justice and delinquency prevention.
- Conduct evaluation studies of the programs and activities assisted by the federal acts.

It may also:

- Collect, evaluate, publish, and disseminate statistics and other information on the condition and progress of criminal justice in the state.
- Perform other functions and duties as required by federal acts, rules, regulations or guidelines in acting as the administrative office of the state planning agency for distribution of federal grants.

==== California Major Narcotic Vendors Prosecution Law ====
The California Major Narcotic Vendors Prosecution Law is a program of financial and technical assistance for district attorneys' offices, whose funds are administered and disbursed by the executive director of the office in consultation with the CCCJ.

=== Judicial Criminal Justice Planning Committee ===
The Judicial Criminal Justice Planning Committee is a committee tasked with giving the CCCJ advice and assistance, with members appointed by the Judicial Council of California.
