= Orange County Sheriff's Department =

Law enforcement agency in California, US

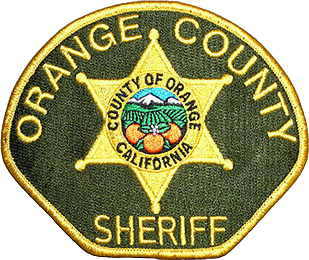
- Patch of the Orange County Sheriff's Department

- Flag of Orange County, California
- Common name: Orange County Sheriff
- Abbreviation: OCSD

Agency overview
- Formed: August 1, 1889; 137 years ago
- Employees: 4,000

Jurisdictional structure
- Operations jurisdiction: Orange County, California, U.S.
- Jurisdiction of Orange County Sheriff's Department
- Area: 948 square miles (2,460 km^{2})
- Population: 3,190,400
- General nature: Local civilian police

Operational structure
- Headquarters: Santa Ana, California
- Sworn/Professionals: 4,000
- Agency executive: Don Barnes, Sheriff

Facilities
- Jails: 4
- Helicopters: 5

Website
- OCSD

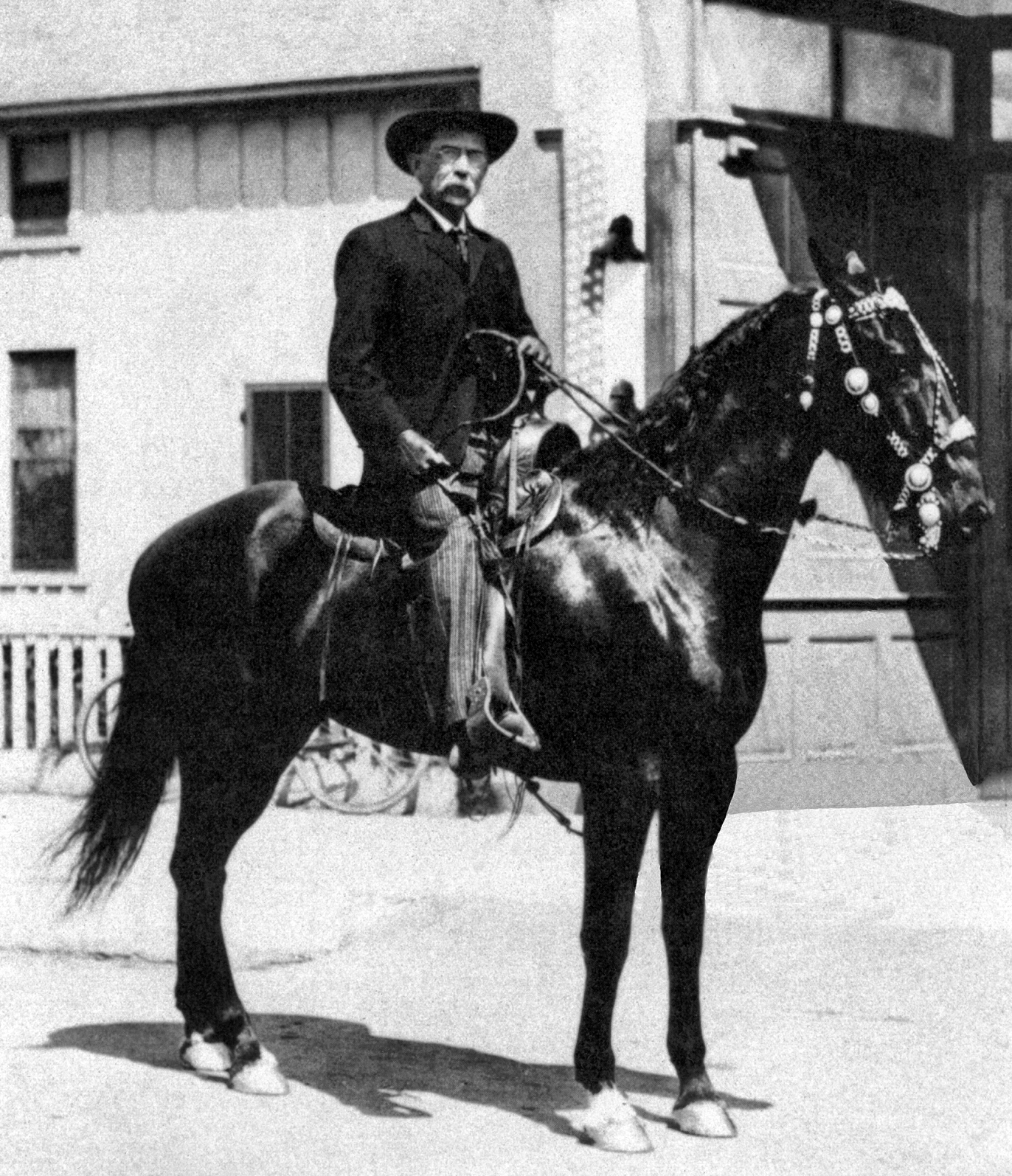
Orange County Sheriff Theo Lacy on horseback, 1890s

The Orange County Sheriff's Department (OCSD) is the law enforcement agency serving Orange County, California. It currently serves the unincorporated areas of Orange County and thirteen contract cities in the county: Aliso Viejo, Dana Point, Laguna Hills, Laguna Niguel, Laguna Woods, Lake Forest, Mission Viejo, Rancho Santa Margarita, San Clemente, San Juan Capistrano, Stanton, Villa Park, and Yorba Linda.

The agency also provides law enforcement services to the Orange County Transportation Authority (OCTA) system, and John Wayne Airport. OCSD also runs Orange County's Harbor Patrol, which provides law enforcement, marine fire fighting, search and rescue, and underwater search and recovery services along the county's 42 miles (68 km) of coastline and in the county's three harbors (Dana Point, Newport and Huntington).

The OC Sheriff is Don Barnes.

== History ==
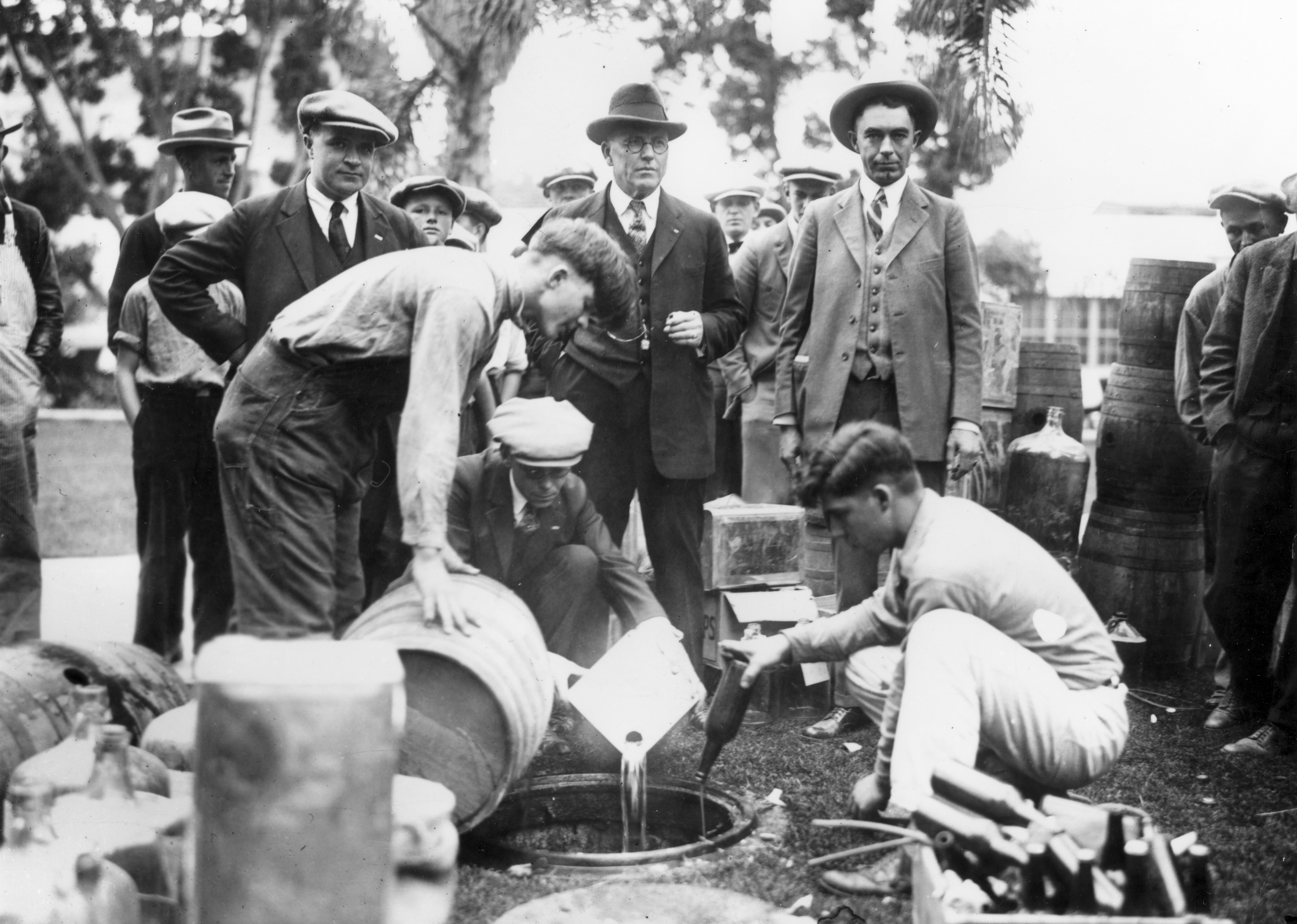
J. Elliott, Joe Ryan, Sheriff Sam Jernigan, and Undersheriff Ed McClellan shown dumping bootleg liquor, circa 1925

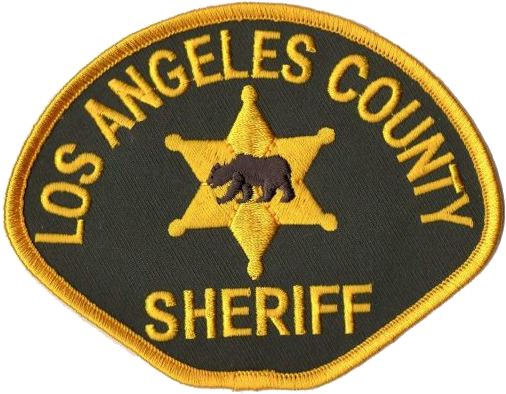
Los Angeles County Sheriff. Orange County was split from the Los Angeles County in 1889

=== Early years ===
The Orange County Sheriff's Department was established on August 1, 1889, after the California State Legislature separated the southern part of Los Angeles County to form Orange County. The first staff included Sheriff Richard Harris and Deputy James Buckley. The department had an annual budget of $1,200 and operated a small jail in a rented basement in Santa Ana. At the time, the county had about 13,000 residents spread across 782 square miles (2,030 km^{2}) of largely rural land. Early law enforcement duties included pursuing outlaws, addressing vagrancy, and maintaining order in scattered communities.

Since the county was expanding, the department grew with it. The Spurgeon Square Jail was opened by Sheriff Joe Nichols in 1897, and the Orange County Courthouse followed in 1901. Sheriff Theo Lacy (the second and fourth sheriff of Orange County, who served from 1890 to 1894 and from 1899 to 1911) was able to move from borrowed office space in Santa Ana to a dedicated headquarters in the courthouse that remained in operation until 1924.

When he took office in 1911, Sheriff Charles Ruddock commanded a staff of eight full-time deputies and jailers, serving a county of nearly 34,000 citizens. But the county's frontier past returned to haunt it on December 16, 1912, when Undersheriff Robert Squires became the first member of the department to be killed in the line of duty while part of a posse attempting to apprehend a violent fugitive.

The county's growing population brought new challenges. Most of the county had outlawed liquor by the time Sheriff Calvin Jackson took office in 1915. Raids of "blind pig" businesses that served as fronts for illegal liquor sales were commonplace. When Congress passed the 18th Amendment in 1920, Prohibition became the law of the land. Suppressing illegal liquor operations became a major focus for the department over the next decade.

By the time Sheriff Sam Jernigan took office in 1923, rum runners and bootleggers were commonplace along the coastline and in Orange County's harbors, using them as a base of operation for smuggling Canadian liquor into the country. Thanks to Jernigan's diligence, many of them ended up serving time in the new county jail on Sycamore Street in Santa Ana, a building that would serve as OCSD's main jail and headquarters for the next forty-four years. Jernigan remained in office until the end of the decade. By 1930, the department had grown to include eighteen full-time personnel with an operating budget of $49,582. The county's population was approaching 119,000, over half of which was scattered across a mostly rural landscape.

Sheriff Logan Jackson assumed office in 1931, and for the next eight years guided the department through a turbulent decade. The 1933 Long Beach Earthquake caused widespread damage throughout the county, especially in Santa Ana. In 1938, a week of intense rain overflowed the Santa Ana River, causing a massive flood that caused over $30 million in damage. The sheriff also had to deal with the Citrus Riots of 1936, an agricultural labor dispute that led to a strike and subsequent disturbance so large that Sheriff Jackson swore in over four hundred special deputies to help control the violence. Sheriff Jackson believed that the labor unrest, caused by the depressed wages of citrus workers, was fomented by communists. On July 7, 1936, he issued a "Shoot to Kill" order, claiming "This is no fight between orchardists and pickers... it is a fight between the entire population of Orange County and a bunch of Communists." His actions created a reign of terror for striking citrus workers, but Jackson's term in office also saw advancements for the department, such as an expansion of the Sycamore Jail that included the county's first radio dispatch center. One of his final acts as sheriff was to implement the wearing of uniforms and a standardized badge for all thirty of his deputies.

=== World War II and the creation of the reserve bureau ===
Sheriff Jesse Elliott replaced Jackson in 1939, just as the Depression was ending and the county once again began to prosper. This peaceful time was cut short by the outbreak of World War II in 1941, which created challenges unlike any others in department history. Most of Orange County's peace officers left for war, leaving the department critically understaffed. This was made worse by the fact that in addition to his normal responsibilities, the Sheriff was now required to assist with mandatory civil defense measures such as air raid drills and blackouts, as well as help police the seven wartime military bases within the county borders. Elliott suddenly found himself responsible for twice as many duties with only a fraction of his former staff to carry them out. To meet this need, he formed the Sheriff's Emergency Reserve, which eventually became the department's current reserve bureau.

=== Post-World War II ===
In 1946, retired NFL star and former deputy James A. Musick came home from the war and successfully ran for the office of Sheriff, assuming command in 1947. He would serve as Sheriff for the next twenty-eight years – the longest term in department history. When he took office, the county was still mostly rural, with a population of 216,000 served by a department of only seventy-six. During Musick's administration, a number of divisions and facilities were commissioned that remain active to this day. He implemented the county's first crime lab, its first Peace Officer's Training Center (now known as the Katella Facility), and the nation's first law enforcement Explorer post. The 1960s saw the construction of the Orange County Industrial Farm (later renamed the James A. Musick Jail Facility), the Theo Lacy Facility, and the headquarters and central jails still in use today. In response to the civil unrest of the late 1960s, Musick formed the Emergency Action Group Law Enforcement (EAGLE) team, a group of deputies with specialized training in various riot control and specialized tactics. Although the team disbanded several years later, certain platoons evolved into the modern-day SWAT, hazardous devices, and mounted patrol units. The department grew even larger when the coroner's office merged with it in 1971. By the time Musick retired in 1974, the county had expanded to a rapidly urbanizing population of over 1,400,000, with the department having grown to a staff of over 900.

Musick's handpicked successor was Brad Gates, who became sheriff in 1975. The department continued its rapid expansion during his administration, with the merging of two more agencies – the Orange County Harbor Patrol and the Stanton Police Department. In response to severe jail overcrowding, the Intake Release Center was opened in 1988, completing the modern-day Central Jails Complex. Gates also established the Air Support Bureau and created the Laser Village tactical training center, as well as the county's first DNA laboratory. The continuing urbanization of the county resulted in several cities incorporating and becoming contract patrol areas. Gates also steered the department through the challenges of a severe county bankruptcy in 1994. He also oversaw the final funeral services for Richard Nixon in Yorba Linda that same year. By the time he retired in 1999, the department had grown to over 3000 members.

=== Sheriff Carona ===
Sheriff Michael Carona took office in 1999 and oversaw a merger of the Orange County Marshal's Department (his former agency) with OCSD. His term brought additional department expansion, including a modernized Katella Facility and a new OCSD Academy in Tustin. Patrol cars were equipped with mobile computers, and anti-terrorism units were formed in response to the events of September 11, 2001. Carona received an initial surge in popularity due to the department's handling of high-profile cases such as the abduction and murder of Samantha Runnion, being declared "America's Sheriff" and "America's Sheriff Department" by Larry King. In 2007, Carona and former members of his executive staff were indicted on multiple corruption charges. He was convicted of a felony and entered Englewood Federal Correctional Institution in January 2011. Carona was released in May 2015 to complete his sentence by home confinement.

Carona's replacement, retired L.A. Sheriff's Commander Sandra Hutchens, was appointed by the County Board of Supervisors after a nationwide search for a suitable candidate. Hutchens reorganized the agency after assuming office and created new branches such as the Homeland Security Division, a unified command for the various bureaus responsible for the county's security. In 2016, the Board of Supervisors approved a contract expanding the department's budget, raising deputy salaries "8.5 percent" and costing taxpayers "an additional $62.2 million" overall.

=== Beds for Feds (2010-2019) ===
In 2010, OCSD and Immigration and Customs Enforcement (ICE) reached an agreement that would allow federal detainees to be placed in Orange County Jail facilities and several county deputies to be cross trained as ICE Special Agents. While this contract was set to expire in July 2020, Sheriff-Coroner Don Barnes announced in 2019 that the County intended to terminate the contract early. Barnes explained that the decision was not politically motivated but rather a "business decision" due to the relatively small detainee population, and resulting scarcity of federal funding. Barnes also emphasized that ending this contract with ICE would open up more jail beds for residents living with mental illness, and allow county personnel to shift priorities from detaining immigrants to incarcerating the mentally ill.

== Organization ==
The OCSD is divided into twenty divisions covering five organizational functions: Public Protection; Jail Operations; Technical Services such as investigations, coroner services, and emergency management; and Administrative and Support Services.

The Orange County Marshal's Department was absorbed by OCSD on July 1, 2000; then-Sheriff Michael Carona was the last Marshal. OCSD, under its Court Operations Division, now provides all security and law enforcement services (such as Bailiff services, weapons screening checkpoints and prisoner custody) to the county court system.

The OCSD currently has 1,460 sworn deputies and over 1,446 civilian personnel, with another 800 reserve personnel.

The department-issued sidearm is generally a Glock 17 (which is chambered for 9mm) with an attached Surefire weapon-mounted light. However deputies are also allowed to purchase and carry an approved sidearm of their own (in 9mm, 40 S&W or 45 ACP) and another favored sidearm by some is the Staccato P, which is also carried by Sheriff Barnes.

== Command staff ==
=== Executive Command ===
- Sheriff-Coroner Don Barnes
  - Undersheriff Jeff Hallock

=== Administrative Services Command ===
- Executive Director Brian Wayt
    - Communications and Technology
    - Financial/Administrative Services
    - Research and Development
    - Support Services

=== Custody Operations Command ===
- Assistant Sheriff Jeff Puckett
    - Central Jail Complex
    - Musick Facility
    - Theo Lacy Facility
    - Intake Release Center and Transportation
    - Inmate Services

=== Professional Services Command ===
- Assistant Sheriff Cory Martino
    - Court Services
    - Professional Standards
    - S.A.F.E.
    - Training
    - Force

=== Investigations Command ===
- Assistant Sheriff Cory Martino

=== Field Operations Command ===
Assistant Sheriff John McCulloch

== Rank structure ==
Title	Insignia
Sheriff	
Undersheriff	
Assistant Sheriff	
Commander	
Captain	
Lieutenant	
Sergeant	
Investigator	
Master Field Training Officer	
Deputy Sheriff II	No insignia
Deputy Sheriff I	No insignia

=== Sworn ===
- Sheriff-Coroner (1)
- Undersheriff (1)
- Assistant Sheriff (4)
- Commander (13)
- Captain (15) / Chief Deputy Coroner
- Lieutenant / Assistant Chief Deputy Coroner
- Sergeant / Supervising Deputy Coroner
- Investigator
- Master Field Training Officer
- Deputy Sheriff II / Senior Deputy Coroner
- Deputy Sheriff I / Deputy Coroner
- Reserve Deputy Sheriff

=== Non-sworn ===
- Sheriff's Special Officer II
- Sheriff's Special Officer I
- Sheriff's Crime Scene Investigators
- Sheriff's Correctional Services Assistant
- Sheriff's Community Services Officer
- Sheriff's Correctional Services Technician
- Sheriff's Crime Prevention Specialists
- Sheriff's Professional Staff
- Sheriff's Cadets

=== Explorers ===
Title	Insignia
Explorer Commander (1)	
Explorer Captain (2)	
Explorer Lieutenant	
Explorer Sergeant	
Explorer Corporal	
Explorer	No insignia
Explorer Recruit	No insignia

== Field Operations and Investigative Services ==
=== John Wayne Airport Police Services ===
John Wayne Airport Police Services provides responsive and professional service to John Wayne Airport. The Bureau consists of Deputy Sheriffs and Sheriff's Special Officers along with Explosive Detection Teams. They are vigilant against threats (foreign or domestic) to ensure the security and safe operation of the airport. All Airport Police Services employees are expected, by the department, to represent the department and John Wayne Airport in a friendly, helpful, and professional manner. The current head of John Wayne Airport Police Services is Commander Jared Dahl.

=== Homeland Security Division ===
The division has five separate bureaus, each with a nexus to local homeland security. Each is run by a lieutenant or administrative manager. The division is led by Commander Brent Jasper.

- Special Enforcement Bureau (SWAT section/Canine Services/Air-Support Unit/Hazardous Devices Unit/Tactical Arrest Team/Crisis Negotiators Team)
- Mass Transit Bureau (OCTA /Explosive Detection Unit/Module-Rail section)
- Marine Operations Bureau (Newport Beach Station/Dana Point Station/Sunset-Huntington Station)
- Mutual-Aid Bureau (Counter Terrorism section-JTTF/Grants/Sheriff's Response Team)
- Orange County Intelligence and Assessment Center

==== Orange County Harbor Patrol - Marine Operations ====
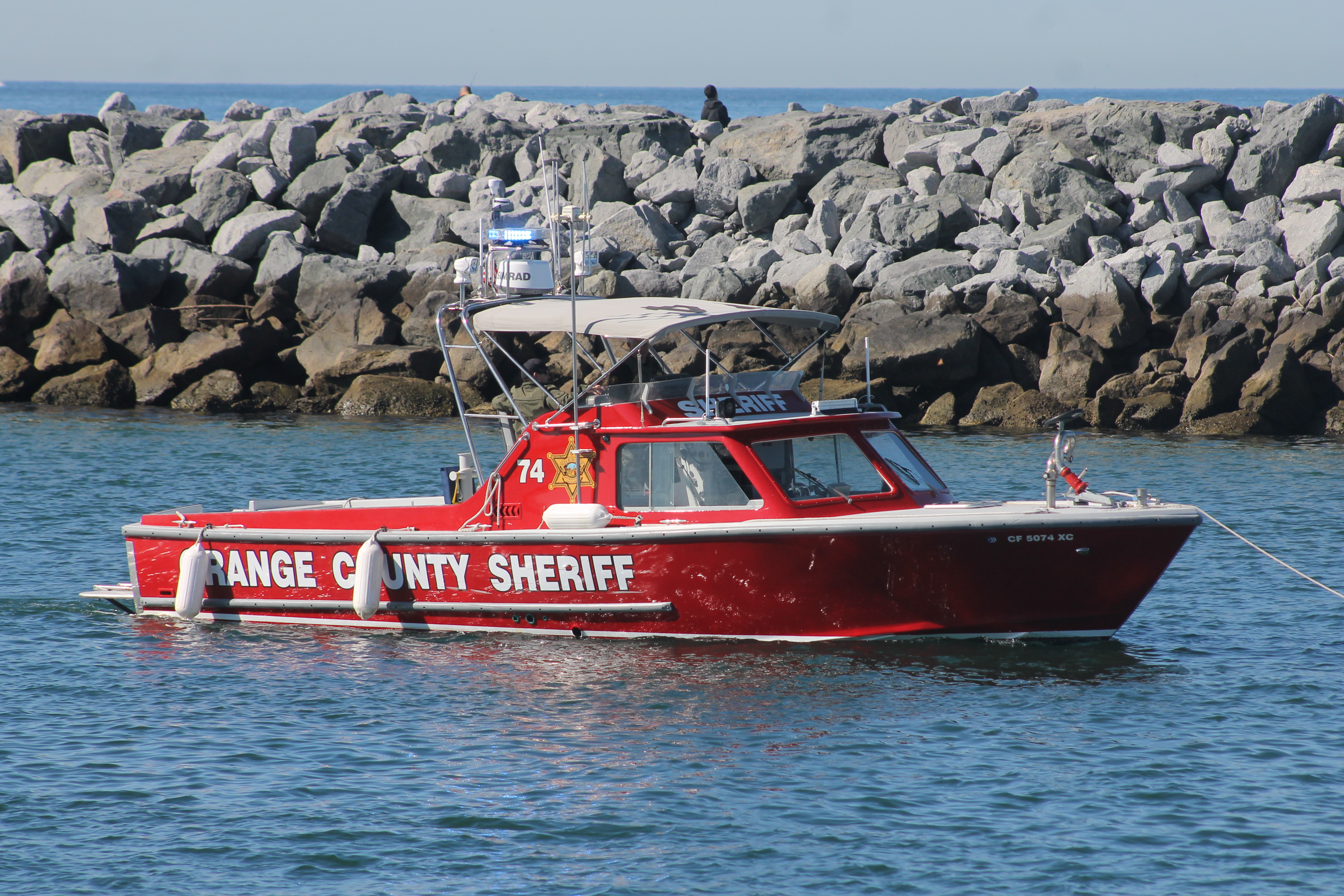
A Boat assigned to Newport Harbor.

Orange County Harbor Patrol includes maritime security and enforcement of laws in Orange County's Harbors. Sheriff's personnel frequently work in conjunction with Federal Homeland Security, and United States Coast Guard for interdiction of contraband and human trafficking. The current head of Harbor Patrol is Orange County Harbormaster, Lieutenant Chris Corn.

- Sunset Beach Harbor, California
- Newport Harbor, California
- Dana Point Harbor, California

==== Aircraft ====
OCSD Duke 6 Bell UH 1H N186SD

The department's 5 helicopters are (3 Eurocopter AS350 B2 [or "A*Stars"] and 2 rescue UH-1H Huey's) use the radio call sign "Duke" (after actor and Newport Beach resident John Wayne) and, appropriately, use John Wayne Airport as their operational base. The original "Duke" helicopters (a pair of Boeing 500s) had an image of John Wayne riding atop a sheriff's badge (while waving his cowboy hat) painted on the fuselage. The Aviation Unit covers the 13 contract cities the department serves, unincorporated communities, as well as a contract with the Santa Ana police department.

==== OC Transit Police Services ====
The current head of OCTA Police Services is Captain Miguel Sotelo.

- Orange County Transit Authority

=== Investigations ===
The Investigations Division comprises the Criminal Investigations and Special Investigations Bureaus. The Criminal Investigations Division is based out of headquarters in Santa Ana, California. The Special Investigations division is stationed across the county headquarters, John Wayne Airport, and the Aliso Viejo station. The current head of the Investigations Division is Commander Anthony Benfield.

==== Criminal Investigations Bureau ====
- Captain Rachel Puckett
  - Bank Robbery Apprehension Team
  - Computer Forensics Detail
  - Crime Analysis Detail
  - Cyber Crimes Detail
  - Economic Crimes
  - Family Protection Detail
  - Homicide Detail
  - Special Victims Detail

==== Special Investigations Bureau ====
- Captain Rene De La Rosa
  - Gang Enforcement
  - Narcotics/Vice
  - Specialized Task Forces
  - Special Operations
  - Highway Interdiction Team

=== North Operations ===
North Operations includes patrol and investigative services for the northern boundaries of Orange County, it is based in Sheriff's Headquarters, Santa Ana, California. The current head of North Operations is Commander Brent Benson.

==== Emergency Communications Bureau ====
- Captain Marcus Perez
- Control One
- Dispatch

==== North Patrol ====
- Captain A.J. Patella
  - Unincorporated areas of
    - Anaheim
    - Brea
    - Costa Mesa
    - Garden Grove
    - La Habra
    - Newport Beach
    - Orange
    - Placentia
    - Santa Ana
    - Tustin
  - Communities of
    - Emerald Bay
    - Midway City
    - Rossmoor
    - Silverado Canyon
  - City of
    - Stanton
    - Villa Park
    - Yorba Linda

==== Security Bureau ====
The purpose of the Security Bureau is to provide uniformed law enforcement presence at contracted county facilities

- Captain William Longan
  - Contracted Facilities
    - Chief Executive Office
    - The Orange County Clerk-Recorder
    - Assessor and Treasury/ Tax Collector
    - County Social Services Agency
    - Child Support Services
    - Probation
    - Health Care Agency
    - Hall of Administration

==== North Investigations ====
North Investigations consists of general criminal investigations, in-custody court liaison and jail crimes. North Investigators are responsible for The City of Villa Park, county facilities, county parks, the unincorporated communities within North Operations, jail facilities, justice facilities, John Wayne Airport, and the Orange County Fairgrounds

==== Stanton Police Services ====
Stanton Police Services includes patrol and investigative services for the city of Stanton, California after the Stanton Police Department was absorbed by OCSD. The current head of Stanton Police Services is Captain Charlie Walters.

- Stanton, California

==== Yorba Linda Police Services ====
The Sheriff's Department has provided law enforcement services to the City of Yorba Linda since January 2013 after the city decided not to renew its contract with the Brea Police Department. The current head of Yorba Linda Police Services is Captain Joses Walehwa

=== Southeast Operations ===
The Southeast Operations Division provides law enforcement services to southeast boundaries of Orange County. The division is based out of the Saddleback Station in the City of Lake Forest, California.

==== Contract cities ====
- Commander Kirsten Wintersheid
  - Cities of
    - Lake Forest, California
    - Mission Viejo, California
    - Rancho Santa Margarita, California

==== South Patrol ====
- Captain Joe Vollmer
  - Communities of
    - Coto de Caza, California
    - Ladera Ranch, California
    - Las Flores, California
    - Ortega Highway
    - Trabuco Canyon, California
    - Wagon Wheel, California

=== Southwest Operations ===
The Southwest Operations Division provides law enforcement services to southwest boundaries of Orange County. The division is based out of the Aliso Viejo Station in the City of Aliso Viejo, California. The current head of Southwest Operations is Commander Virgil Asuncion.

  - Cities of
    - Aliso Viejo, California
    - Dana Point, California
    - Laguna Hills, California
    - Laguna Niguel, California
    - Laguna Woods, California
    - San Clemente, California
    - San Juan Capistrano, California

In 1993, the San Clemente Police Department was absorbed into OCSD, however San Clemente only allows the former San Clemente Police Station to be used by deputies who patrol their city.

== Training Division ==
The Training Division develops, schedules, and presents law enforcement training for sworn peace officers and professional staff. They use two training sites ensuring the best learning environment possible, depending on the specific needs of the course. Advanced officer training is primarily conducted at the Katella Facility. Academy and entry-level training is primarily conducted at the Sheriff's Regional Training Academy. The Orange County Sheriff's Department, as well as multiple local, state and federal public safety agencies train at and use both sites. Extensive input from law enforcement and other leaders throughout the county help to mold the curriculum and training that is offered. Both facilities are often used seven days per week and support daytime and evening instruction. The division is led by Commander David Main.

The Orange County Sheriff's Regional Training Academy is in Tustin, California, on the site of the former Tustin Marine Corps Air Station. It opened in late 2007, replacing the old academy on Salinas Avenue in Garden Grove which was no longer adequate due to overcrowding. The Orange County Sheriff's Regional Training Academy produces Deputy Sheriffs & Police Officers, Sheriff's Special Officers, and Correctional Services Assistants. Some training is also conducted at a Sheriff's facility on Katella Avenue in Orange, California.

The Katella Training Facility in Orange, California, houses the qualifications range, tactical range, administrative offices, advanced officer training, and elements of Homeland Security Division's Special Enforcement Bureau.

Some of the Orange County municipal agencies that send their recruit officers to OCSA are Newport Beach Police Department, Laguna Beach Police Department, Irvine Police Department, Costa Mesa Police Department, University of California Irvine Police Department, Fullerton Police Department, Garden Grove Police Department, Westminster Police Department, La Habra Police Department, Brea Police Department, Placentia Police Department, Tustin Police Department and Orange Police Department.

Many Los Angeles County municipal police agencies send their recruits to be trained by those at OCSA. Some of these police departments are: Beverly Hills PD, Santa Monica PD, University of California Los Angeles PD, Torrance PD, Hawthorne PD, Palos Verdes Estates PD, Redondo Beach PD, Manhattan Beach PD, South Gate PD, Burbank PD and Glendale PD.

== Jails ==
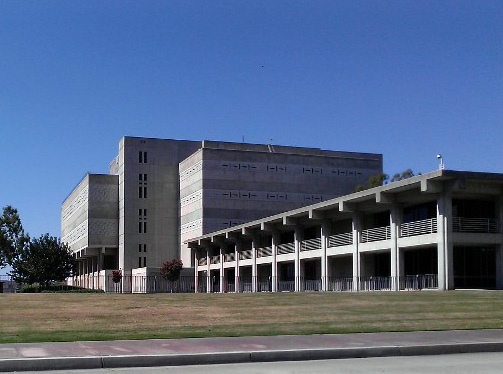
OC Central Jail Complex in Santa Ana

The OCSD Custody Operations Division operates four jails:

- Central Men's Jail and Women's Jail - The Central Jail Complex, opened in 1968, is located next to the department offices in Santa Ana. It houses approximately 2,664 inmates. In January 2016, three inmates escaped from the jail.
- Intake Release Center (IRC) - In 1988 as a part of the Central Jail Complex, the Intake Release Center was built to facilitate the intake and processing of inmates, and the including medical screening, booking, properidentification, and transfers between facilities. While it is a transitional facility, it also holds male and female inmates for brief periods.
- Theo Lacy Facility - The TLF, located in the city of Orange, was originally built in 1960. A major expansion completed in 2006 brought its capacity to 3,100 inmates, making it the largest jail in the county.
- James A. Musick Facility - A minimum security facility located on unincorporated county land near Lake Forest and Irvine, "The Farm" provides custodial and rehabilitative programs for 1256 adult male and female inmates.

== Courts ==
After the Orange County Marshal's Department was absorbed by OCSD, the sheriff's department became responsible for providing court services. There are Sheriff's personnel stationed at the Justice Centers throughout the county. Sheriff's staff at the Justice Centers fulfill the vital mission of the Sheriff that include bailiff services in each courtroom and weapons screening operations in the lobby of each Justice Center. Each justice center houses a detention holding facility for inmates who are appearing in court each day. These detention facilities are staffed by Deputy Sheriffs. There are also Deputies assigned to the Civil Enforcement Bureau who handle services in every city of the county serving restraining orders and court subpoenas, conducting evictions, and effecting bench warrants. The Special Operations and Judicial Protection Unit provides specialized protective and investigative services to counter any threats, perceived or real towards the judiciary of the Superior Court of California, County of Orange. All of these personnel fall under the Court Operations Division of the OCSD Professional Services Command. The current head of Court Operations is Commander Ehren Weidenkeller. Orange County Sheriff's Offices are located at the following Superior Court of California facilities in the County of Orange:

- Central Justice Center (CJC) in Santa Ana
- Lamoreaux Family & Juvenile Law Justice Center (LJC) in Orange
- North Justice Center (NJC) in Fullerton
- West Justice Center (WJC) in Westminster
- Harbor Justice Center (HJC) in Newport Beach
- Costa Mesa Justice Complex (CMJC) in Costa Mesa

== Orange County Sheriff's Department Explorer Post 449 ==
In November 1959, Orange County Sheriff James A. Musick wanted "young men," who desired exposure in the field of law enforcement to be afforded the opportunity to do so. In a newspaper article he stated, "We organized the group after we found that other special interest Explorer Posts were taking our best young men from our high schools. We decided, rather than take what was left over after other fields of endeavor took the best, that we should start training young men of high school age now for a career in law enforcement."

Thus, the first Law Enforcement Exploring Post in the nation was established. Its purposes were, "To train young men of today for the future that awaits them in the law enforcement field of tomorrow. To stimulate young men's interest in law enforcement practices, the code of ethics, and the fine qualities of citizenship which are expected, to briefly explore all phases of law enforcement and to be a definite approach to juvenile decency." Post 449 began with twenty-eight explorers in Santa Ana who had to meet the qualifications of being "between 14 and 21, must maintain a "B" average in school, have a clean record, be of outstanding citizenship in their community and have a general reputation beyond reproach."

In 1973, after fifteen years of only young men being allowed in the Exploring program, Boy Scouts of America allowed young women to explore careers in law enforcement through membership in an Explorer Program. Maintaining the same high standards for qualification and training these young women diversified the Department's Post.

When the residents of contract cities and the unincorporated county area need help they call the Sheriff's Department; when the Sheriff's Department needs help they call on their Explorers. The Orange County Sheriff's Explorer Post supports deputies during road closures caused by natural disasters such as mudslides, floods and forest fires. They complete search missions where either missing persons or evidence is sought and are deployed to protect crime scene perimeters. This involvement, by the Explorers, allows patrol deputies to be available for calls for service.

Explorers are also used to assist in public education. They distribute brochures explaining changes in parking regulations or temporary street closures. During Bicycle Rodeo Events, Explorers demonstrate to children how to properly size and wear bicycle helmets. They offer child identification and crime awareness, through a "Kid-Print" program and assist in crime prevention demonstrations throughout the county.

The department's Explorers serve the community by providing crowd and traffic control during Basic Academy Graduations, County Building Dedications, Mall grand openings, Community awareness fairs, 10 K runs, parades and other charitable events. The Post's Color guard is used to present the flag at City Council and County Board of Supervisor meetings, as well as scouting and civic events.

The Orange County Sheriff's Department Explorers participate in Law Enforcement competitions throughout the state. The Explorers also compete in Tug-of War, Volleyball and Obstacle Course competitions.

The Department's Advisors also serve on the County-wide Organization as Ranking Officials, Academy Directors, Tactical Training Officers and Instructors at the Explorer Academy. In addition to Orange County, these Advisors have trained and taught Explorers from Kern, Los Angeles, San Diego, Riverside and Ventura counties.

== List of sheriffs ==
- Richard T. Harris (1889–1891)
- Theo Lacy (1891–1895)
- Joe C. Nichols (1895–1899)
- Theo Lacy (1899–1911)
- Charles Ruddock (1911–1915)
- Calvin E. Jackson (1915–1923)
- Sam Jernigan (1923–1931)
- Logan Jackson (1931–1939)
- Jesse L. Elliott (1939–1947)
- James A. Musick (1947–1975)
- Brad Gates (1975–1999)
- Mike Carona (1999–2008)
- Jack Anderson (assistant sheriff, acting as sheriff) (January–June 2008)
- Sandra Hutchens (2008–January 7, 2019)
- Don Barnes (January 7, 2019–present)

== See also ==
- List of law enforcement agencies in California
