= Jim Musick =

American football player and sheriff (1910–1992)

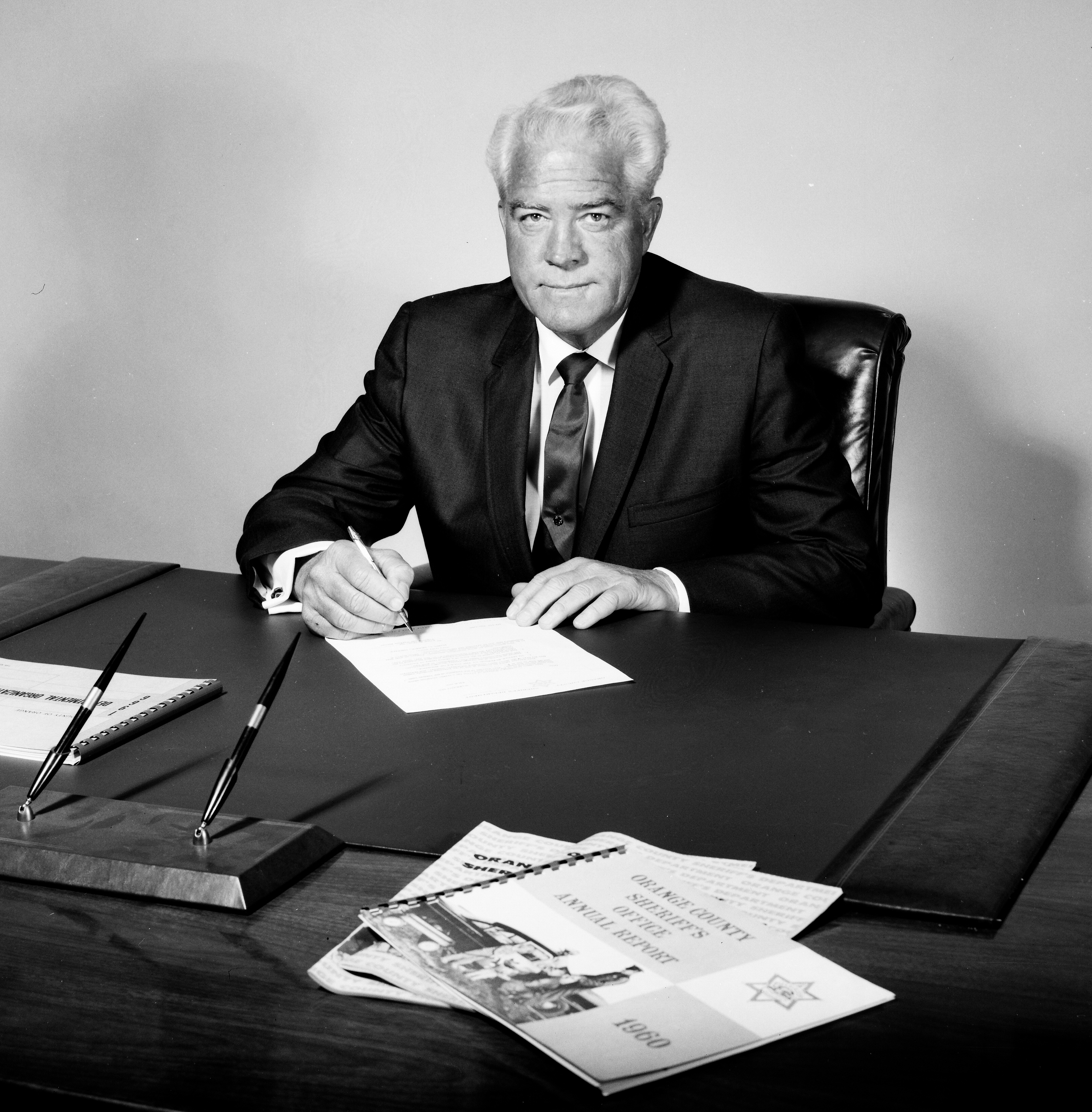
- Musick as the sheriff of Orange County, c. 1966

10th Sheriff-Coroner of Orange County, California
- In office 1947–1975
- Preceded by: Jesse L. Elliott
- Succeeded by: Brad Gates

Personal details
- Born: May 5, 1910 Kirksville, Missouri, U.S.
- Died: December 15, 1992 (aged 82) Santa Ana, California, U.S.
- Football career

No. 25
- Position: Fullback

Career information
- College: USC

Career history
- Boston Braves/Redskins (1932–1936)

Awards and highlights
- NFL rushing yards leader (1933); National champion (1931); NFL records: Most career interceptions thrown without recording a passing touchdown: 15

Career statistics
- Carries: 327
- Rushing yards: 1,313
- Rushing touchdowns: 8
- Passing TD–INT: 0–15
- Stats at Pro Football Reference

James Andrew Musick (May 5, 1910 – December 15, 1992) was an American law enforcement official and professional football player.

He played college football for the USC Trojans and professionally for the Boston Braves/Redskins of the National Football League (NFL) from 1932 to 1936, leading the league in rushing in 1933. He later became the Sheriff of Orange County, California, serving from 1947 to 1975.

== Early life and college career ==
Jim Musick was born May 5, 1910, in Kirksville, Missouri to a family of some note. Famous relatives included authors John R. Musick and Ruth Ann Musick, as well as painter Archie Musick. His family moved to Southern California when Jim was a young boy. After attending Santa Ana High School, Musick played college football at the University of Southern California (USC) from 1929 to 1931.

It was at USC he earned the nickname "Sweet" Musick as he helped lead the Trojans to two Rose Bowl victories and a national championship in 1931. Musick had 393 carries for 1,605 yards at USC. While at USC, Musick even had a brief flirtation with Hollywood, having an uncredited role along with fellow Trojan players and former player John Wayne in the 1932 movie That's My Boy. He was inducted into the Orange County Sports Hall of Fame in 1986.

== Professional career ==
After graduation from USC in 1932, Musick signed with the Boston Redskins (now the Washington Commanders) where he would play for four seasons. Musick led the NFL in rushing in 1933 with 173 carries for 809 yards, an average of 4.7 yards per carry, along with five touchdowns. For these accomplishments he was named to the 1933 NFL All-Star Team. Musick returned to the Redskins in 1935 only to suffer a season-ending knee injury three weeks into the season. In a bid to earn a new contract for more money, Musick refused to report for training camp in 1936. The Redskins would not give into the demands and waived Musick. Picked up off waivers by the Green Bay Packers in 1937, Musick prepared to report for training camp. However, he reinjured the knee while playing badminton two weeks prior to camp, effectively ending his NFL career.

Despite his effectiveness as a runner, Musick holds an infamous record when it comes to passing. His 15 career interceptions thrown is the most of any player with 0 career passing touchdowns in NFL history.

== Sheriff's Deputy ==
While still a professional football player, Jim Musick began working in the offseason as a deputy for the Orange County Sheriff's Department, which was headquartered in his hometown of Santa Ana, California. After retirement from the NFL, Musick took up law enforcement full-time, except for a period during World War II when he served as a US Marine officer.

== Sheriff of Orange County, California ==
In 1946, Musick won election to the first of seven consecutive terms as Orange County Sheriff, remaining at the post until deciding not to seek re-election in 1974. The James A. Musick Facility, part of the Orange County Sheriff's Department, is named for him.

== Death ==
Musick died December 15, 1992, at a nursing home in his hometown of Santa Ana, California.
