= Murder of Casey Williamson =

2002 kidnapping and murder of a six-year-old girl in Missouri, U.S.

Casey Williamson
- Casey Williamson
- Born: Cassandra Lynn Williamson; November 23, 1995; Valley Park, Missouri, U.S.
- Died: July 26, 2002 (aged 6); Valley Park, Missouri, U.S.
- Cause of death: Fatal head injuries
- Resting place: Sacred Heart Cemetery
- Other name: Casey Williamson
- Education: Valley Park Elementary School
- Occupation: Student (former)
- Known for: Victim of a kidnapping-murder case
- Parents: Ernie Williamson (father); Angie Williamson (mother)

On July 26, 2002, 6-year-old Cassandra "Casey" Lynn Williamson (born November 23, 1995), disappeared from her hometown of Valley Park, Missouri. After an extensive search, her body was found at an abandoned glass factory. Subsequently, investigations led to the arrest of Johnny Allen Johnson (March 16, 1978 - August 1, 2023), who was a family acquaintance. Johnson, who confessed to murdering the girl while he attempted to rape her, was convicted and sentenced to death in 2005. Despite his claims of mental illness, which were all rejected by the courts, Johnson was executed on August 1, 2023.

== Disappearance and murder ==
On July 26, 2002, at Valley Park in St. Louis County, Missouri, a 6-year-old girl was abducted from her home by a family acquaintance.

Cassandra "Casey" Williamson was last seen around 7am in the kitchen of her home by her father Ernie Williamson. When he noticed her missing, he alerted family members. At the time, Ernie was separated from his wife Angie and lived across the street just to remain close to his children. He happened to be staying over the night before. Within 30 minutes of Williamson's disappearance, her parents reported her missing. The authorities, including local police, St. Louis County deputy sheriffs and FBI agents, conducted the search for the missing little girl, and many members of the community volunteered to look for her.

Subsequently, the police received information from witnesses that they had seen her being carried away by a man who was identified as 24-year-old Johnny Allen Johnson (alias Movant), a friend of the Williamson family. Angie Williamson was a childhood best friend of Johnson's older sister, and even helped babysit Johnson during his childhood years. In fact, the night before Casey went missing, Johnson attended a barbecue at Williamson's house and the family allowed him to spend the night on the couch. He was not there in the morning when Casey was found to be missing. Evidence showed that just six months prior, Johnson was released from a state psychiatric facility, where he was confined due to schizophrenia.

Johnson was brought in for police questioning and he initially denied being involved in the disappearance of Williamson. Soon, however, he admitted that he was responsible for taking Casey from her house and then murdering her. He said that he took the child out to an abandoned glass factory near her home, where he killed her. Williamson's corpse was eventually found in a pit less than a mile from her home by one of the volunteers who had joined the search for her. An autopsy revealed that Williamson died from blunt force injuries to her head, which caused skull fractures and bruising of her scalp and brain. Furthermore, there were other injuries to the arms, shoulders, legs, and back. There were also signs of semen on Johnson's shorts, which indicated that he had likely sexually assaulted Casey.

Upon the discovery of the body, Johnson was apprehended and detained for questioning. Based on further investigations, Johnson, who had previously been convicted of burglary, was found to have abducted Casey and taken her to an abandoned glass factory, where he attempted to rape her. However, as Williamson fought back against his violent assault, Johnson used a brick and large rock to hit her on the head more than once, then battered her to death. After killing her, he left the body in a shallow grave, then washed himself at the nearby Meramec River.

A memorial was held for Casey on July 30, 2002. Mourners, including Williamson's friends and members of the public, gathered at Twin Oaks Presbyterian Church to pay respects, and the memorial was broadcast live on television.

== Trial of Johnny Johnson ==
Johnny Allen Johnson
- Mugshot of Johnny Johnson
- Born: March 16, 1978; Missouri, U.S.
- Died: August 1, 2023 (aged 45); Eastern Reception, Diagnostic and Correctional Center, Bonne Terre, Missouri, U.S.
- Cause of death: Execution by lethal injection
- Convictions: First degree murder Attempted forcible rape Kidnapping; Armed criminal action
- Penalty: Death

Details
- Victims: Casey Williamson, 6
- Date: July 26, 2002
- Location: Valley Park, Missouri
- Imprisoned at: Eastern Reception, Diagnostic and Correctional Center

After his arrest, Johnny Johnson was charged with the kidnapping, attempted rape and murder of Casey Williamson. Under Missouri state law, Johnson faced the death penalty or life imprisonment should he be found guilty of the most serious charge of first-degree murder in the case of Williamson's death.

Johnson's trial took place about two years after his arrest. Standing trial before a St. Louis County jury, Johnson never denied that he murdered Williamson, but his main defence was diminished responsibility. Johnson's lawyers sought to argue that as a result of his psychiatric disorders, including schizoaffective disorder, Johnson's state of mind at the time of the murders was severely impaired and he killed Williamson after experiencing hallucinations, and he was not capable of planning the murder. A psychiatrist diagnosed Johnson with schizoaffective disorder and testified on his behalf, and Johnson's girlfriend testified that Johnson stopped taking his medication and had been acting paranoid during the period leading up to the murder.

In rebuttal, the prosecution called upon psychiatric experts who testified that Johnson was still capable of deliberation and his mental responsibility had not been affected by any psychiatric illnesses, and it was not likely that Johnson would experience any psychosis that resulted in hallucinations that drove him into murdering Williamson; it was also speculated that any hallucinations possibly explored by Johnson during the course of the murder was caused by drug intoxication rather than psychiatric conditions.

On January 18, 2005, the 12-member jury found Johnson guilty of the murder of Williamson, and he was sentenced to death on March 7, 2005, in addition to three consecutive life sentences for the other charges of armed criminal action, kidnapping, and attempted forcible rape.

== Appeal process ==
On November 7, 2006, the Missouri Supreme Court rejected Johnny Johnson's appeal against the death sentence and murder conviction.

On November 20, 2012, Johnson appealed once again to the Missouri Supreme Court, but his motion was denied by the court. About two months later, a follow-up appeal to the Missouri Supreme Court was rejected again on January 29, 2013.

On February 28, 2020, the United States District Court for the Eastern District of Missouri dismissed Johnson's appeal.

== Death warrant and execution ==
On April 20, 2023, the Missouri Supreme Court approved the death warrant of Johnny Johnson, whose death sentence was scheduled to be carried out on August 1, 2023.

Johnson filed last minute appeals to challenge his execution, stating that he was incompetent to be executed due to his schizophrenia, and his lawyers urged the courts to consider that it had affected his state of mind when the murder of Williamson happened, and added that he experienced delusions about the devil using his death to bring about the end of the world. The Missouri Supreme Court rejected the appeal on June 8, 2023.

On July 17, 2023, District Judge Matthew T. Schelp of the United States District Court for the Eastern District of Missouri dismissed the appeal of Johnson to delay his execution. On July 26, 2023, however, the 8th U.S. Circuit Court of Appeals temporarily postponed the execution by a split decision of 2–1. However, the Missouri Attorney General's Office appealed against the ruling, and on July 29, 2023, a re-hearing convened before a different panel at the 8th U.S. Circuit Court of Appeals and the stay order was overturned, allowing the execution to move forward. The U.S. Supreme Court also refused to allow Johnson's appeal and confirmed his death sentence.

As a final resort to escape the death penalty, Johnson petitioned for clemency from the state governor, with hopes that his death sentence could be commuted to life in prison without the possibility of parole. On the eve of the execution, Missouri Governor Mike Parson also rejected Johnson's clemency plea and ordered the execution to move forward as scheduled. Out of Williamson's family, her father opposed executing Johnson due to his opposition to the death penalty, but others, including Williamson's great aunt Della Steele, wanted Johnson to be put to death. Steele urged the governor to not show mercy for Johnson as she felt that justice should be served and instead of turning back, Johnson made the conscious choice of kidnapping and murdering Williamson and caused destruction to the lives of those around her forever.

On August 1, 2023, 45-year-old Johnny Allen Johnson was put to death via lethal injection at Eastern Reception, Diagnostic and Correctional Center in Bonne Terre.

Prior to his execution, Johnson reportedly ordered a final meal of one bacon cheeseburger, curly fries and a strawberry shake. In a brief handwritten last statement, Johnson expressed remorse for the murder and said, "God Bless. Sorry to the people and family I hurt." Johnson was pronounced dead at 6.33pm after he was administered with a single dose of pentobarbital.

Johnson was the fourth person to be executed in Missouri and overall the 16th condemned criminal to be put to death in the U.S. during the year of 2023.

== Aftermath ==
In the aftermath, the abandoned glass factory where the murder happened was demolished in August 2012. In memory of Williamson, her bereaved loved ones established a scholarship, and an annual community safety fair in her name, and provided child identification kits in these events.

In 2022, a crime documentary titled The Worst Crime was released on Amazon Prime Video, which covered the case of Casey Williamson's abduction and murder. A former juror had expressed in the documentary that even after a decade since the crime that the killing was the worst possible crime ever witnessed.

During the final days before the execution, the family of Williamson spoke up in the media about their feelings towards the case. Her mother, who had since divorced her husband and become engaged to another man, stated that the impact of her daughter's murder was so much that Williamson's oldest sister (aged 12 at the time of the murder) had begun abusing drugs and alcohol, and died in 2015 due to substance overdose, and Williamson's two younger siblings (aged 2 and 4 at the time of the murder) had struggled with mental illnesses and making relationships with other people. Another relative revealed that Williamson's grandfather similarly turned to alcoholism due to his grief of losing a granddaughter and died. Casey's mother told the press that while she wanted Johnson to be executed for killing her daughter, she sympathized with his family and felt they did not deserve the blame for Johnson's actions.

== See also ==
- Child abduction scare of 2002
- Capital punishment in Missouri
- List of people executed in Missouri
- List of people executed in the United States in 2023
- List of solved missing person cases (post-2000)

Executions carried out in Missouri
Preceded by Michael Andrew Tisius June 6, 2023	Johnny Allen Johnson; August 1, 2023	Succeeded by Brian Joseph Dorsey April 9, 2024
Executions carried out in the United States
Preceded by James Edward Barber – Alabama August 1, 2023	Johnny Allen Johnson – Missouri; August 1, 2023	Succeeded by James Phillip Barnes – Florida August 3, 2023
