= Child abduction scare of 2002 =

Child safety scare in the United States

During the summer of 2002 there were a number of high-profile child abductions in the United States. Despite the statistical decrease of non-custodial child abductions since 1999, extensive media coverage of selected cases created a nationwide sense of panic. The focus on child abductions led governmental entities to take action. Many states instituted Amber alerts systems and a national Amber alert was included as part of a package of federal legislation known as the PROTECT Act of 2003.

== The kidnappings ==
The intensified media scrutiny began with the abduction and murder of seven-year-old Danielle van Dam earlier that year. She was taken from her bedroom in San Diego on February 1, 2002. A suspect, David Alan Westerfield, was arrested on February 22 and van Dam's body discovered on the 27th. Westerfield's trial began on June 1, 2002 and lasted into August. The trial received intense media scrutiny. San Diego County District Attorney Paul Pfingst stated that “The media's appetite for information in this case was insatiable. The trial was covered day by day on television and on radio. It was a remarkable event probably not to be repeated anytime soon.” Westerfield's defense argued that he could not receive a fair trial without a sequestered jury due to the media frenzy; however, this was denied by the judge. Furthermore, van Dam's parents were put under a microscope due to their liberated sexual lifestyle which included swinging and an open marriage. Westerfield was found guilty on August 21, 2002. On September 16, the jury recommended the death penalty.

On June 5, 2002, the day after the Westerfield trial began, Elizabeth Smart was kidnapped from her home in Salt Lake City. Her parents made a televised plea to the kidnapper on June 6. On June 14 police arrested Richard Ricci, an ex-con who worked as a handyman at the Smarts house, for parole violation. In the continuing weeks he would also be indicted on one count of burglary and two counts of theft, including once from the Smart residence, as well as a Nov. 2001 bank robbery. Ricci would remain the "main focus" of the investigation into Smarts kidnapping until his death due to a brain aneurysm on August 31.

On July 15, 2002 Samantha Runnion was kidnapped in front of her home in Stanton, Orange County, California. Her mutilated body was discovered by hikers the next day in nearby Cleveland National Forest. On July 19, Alejandro Avila was arrested for the murder. Avila was tried and convicted in 2005.

On July 22 Erica Pratt was abducted in Philadelphia, but she was able to escape her kidnappers on July 23. James Burns and Edward Johnson were arrested for Pratt's kidnapping on July 25.

Casey Williamson was abducted from her home on July 27, her body found later that day. Johnny Johnson, a transient who was living with the family, admitted to killing her and led police to the body. Johnson was executed in 2023.

On August 1, Tamara Brooks and Jacqueline Marris were kidnapped from a lovers lane in Lancaster, California. After a 12 hour manhunt the girls were discovered in Walker Pass, in a Ford Bronco being driven by convicted sex offender Roy Ratliff. They went public with their experiences, appearing on TV shows and on the cover of People.

== Government response ==
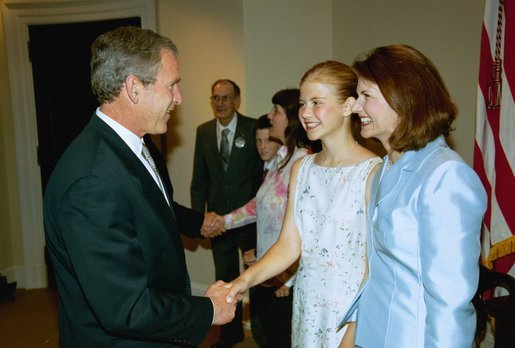
Smart with her mother, Lois, and George W. Bush at the signing of the PROTECT Act of 2003

On August 6, 2002, George W. Bush addressed the problem, specifically mentioning the cases of van Dam and Runnion, and announcing a White House Conference on Missing, Exploited and Runaway Children to convene that September. In October the Office of Juvenile Justice and Delinquency Prevention published a series of bulletins on the issue, specifying the difference between "stereotypical" kidnappings and the much more common family kidnappings.

In October the House of Representatives met to consider a Child Abduction Prevention Act that would create a national Amber alert, as well as mandatory sentencing, lifetime supervision of past offenders, removal of a statute of limitations and pre-trial release, among other things. Consideration of the bill was explicitly linked to the rash of high profile abductions by Representatives Lamar Smith and Mark Green. The legislation would eventually be merged into the PROTECT Act of 2003.

== Media response and precedents ==
The summer of 2002 was characterized as the "summer of child abductions", the "summer of kidnappings" or as an "'epidemic' of child abductions". However, the number of child abductions was actually down in 2002 and had been going down for several years. The real epidemic, according to Michelle Goldberg of Slate, was one of saturation TV coverage.

A number of factors have been suggested to explain the intense focus on child abductions during this period. Child safety advocates noted that parents and local police forces were becoming more media savvy, and had designed methods such as the Amber alert system to get the message out that children were missing during the first hours of being abducted. Others pointed to the particularly brazen nature of the crimes with Danielle van Dam and Elizabeth Smart literally taken from their beds at home.

Some scholars and journalists have noted that the scare came after the trauma of the September 11 attacks, when the country was in a heightened state of paranoia and Americans had a fear of some evil predator lurking in their own communities. Kidnapping scares have been cyclical events in American history often coinciding with anxiety about changing social mores. One of the first child abductions to garner mass media attention was the 1874 kidnapping of Charley Ross as the United States was entering the industrialized Gilded Age. A kidnapping scare occurred during the early 1930s with the Lindbergh and Howard Woolverton cases while the country was in the depths of the Great Depression. These kidnappings were usually for ransom from wealthy families. There was another panic in the 1950s, concurrent with the second red scare; this time greater emphasis was put on potential sexual violation, which meant that now even the children of less wealthy parents could potentially be victims. In the 1980s, as more women entered the workforce concern arose over the safety of children at day care centers. The widely publicized cases of Adam Walsh, Etan Patz and Jacob Wetterling stimulated national paranoia about so-called stranger danger.

== Cultural references ==
The hysteria was satirized on an episode of South Park, "Child Abduction Is Not Funny", which aired July 24, 2002. Dave Chappelle referenced the kidnappings of Smart and Pratt in his 2004 set "How Old is Fifteen Really?".

== See also ==
- Stranger danger
- Missing children panic
- Moral panic
- Summer of the Shark
