= Sandra Hutchens =

American sheriff of Orange County, California (1955–2021)

14th Sheriff-Coroner of Orange County, California
- In office June 14, 2008 – January 7, 2019
- Preceded by: Mike Carona
- Succeeded by: Don Barnes

Personal details
- Born: March 18, 1955 Monterey Park, California
- Died: January 4, 2021 (aged 65) Temecula, California
- Police career
- Service years: Orange County Sheriff's Department 2008–2019; Los Angeles County Sheriff's Department 1978–2008
- Rank: OC Sheriff-Coroner – 6/2008; LASD Chief – 7/2003; LASD Commander – 2001; LASD Captain – 7/1999; LASD Lieutenant – 1994; LASD Sergeant – 1986; Sworn in as a LA County Sheriff's Department Deputy Sheriff – 1978

Sandra Sue Hutchens (March 18, 1955 – January 4, 2021) was an American law enforcement officer who was the Sheriff-Coroner of Orange County, California. She was appointed to the position on June 10, 2008, replacing acting sheriff Jack Anderson, who had led the department since the January 14, 2008 resignation of Mike Carona. Prior to her appointment, she was retired from the position of division chief within the Los Angeles County Sheriff's Department. Hutchens was elected in 2010 and re-elected in 2014. In 2017 Hutchens announced that she would not seek re-election for a third term. She endorsed the successful election bid of Undersheriff Don Barnes.

== Biography ==
Hutchens was raised in Long Beach, California where she graduated from Woodrow Wilson High School. Shortly after graduating from high school she was hired as a secretary for the Los Angeles Sheriff's Department. She graduated from the academy in 1978.

She was a graduate of the University of La Verne, with a bachelor's degree in Public Administration. She also attended the FBI Academy.

== Controversies ==
In her first year as Sheriff of Orange County, Sheriff Hutchens made numerous changes to the Orange County Sheriff's Department, many of which were considered controversial.

=== Concealed weapons permits ===
During the first few months after her appointment as Sheriff-Coroner, her department sent letters to many concealed weapon permit holders, indicating their intention to revoke those permits. The form letters, sent to over six hundred permit holders, read "The Department has determined that your identified risk does not meet the good cause threshold as required under the new CCW policy based upon the information you provided. As a result of this determination, the Department's present intention is to revoke your CCW license." Hutchens states that her reason for the revocation was that she believed "the prior administration stretched good cause" and issued concealed carry permits to political supporters and donors. Many counties in California, especially rural counties such as nearby San Bernardino County, consider a desire for personal protection to be sufficient good cause. However, the Orange County Grand Jury has come out in favor of the sheriff, issuing a report strongly condemning the Board of Supervisors for interfering with the responsibilities of the sheriff's department and determining that Hutchens' policy is legal.

=== Staff terminations ===
Seven former top officials at the Orange County Sheriff's Department filed wrongful termination claims against the county, alleging Sheriff Sandra Hutchens lied when she said they were laid off for budgetary reasons. The two former assistant sheriffs and five captains, including ex-Assistant Sheriffs Jack Anderson and John Davis, allege that Hutchens really laid them off because she disliked their job performance. A performance-based termination would mean that officers should have been given hearings they were entitled to under the state's 'Peace Officers' Bill of Rights,' according to the claims. Hutchens said she chose to lay off the top administrators to keep investigator positions, and that the layoffs saved the department $2.2 million as part of a $28 million plan to pare the agency's budget. But in the claims, the former employees allege their terminations did not save the county any money, and that Hutchens' command staff is now larger than before the series of layoffs.

=== Ballot statements ===
Hutchens was challenged in court in an effort to force her to remove false claims that she cut her command staff by 47%. Hutchens settled the dispute out of court, agreeing to remove the misstatement from her ballot statement. This 47% of command staff is a popular topic in that it was described by Orange County Supervisor Bill Campbell as a "Bait and Switch" and her actions to remove this 47% of command staff and later expand her staff have resulted in a multimillion-dollar lawsuit against the county.

=== Immigration ===
Hutchens told the Trump administration she wanted her department to cooperate more closely with federal immigration agents.

== Campaign ==
At a candidates' forum sponsored by Orange County Young Republicans, Hutchens repeatedly invoked the law for some of her unpopular policies, such as not granting gun permits to people not facing a specific threat, or releasing some inmates early, saying, "If you want more guns and CCWs [concealed weapon permits], then you should vote for one of my opponents." She also stressed that the department had reclaimed its integrity and provided good service.

== Personal life ==
Hutchens' husband Larry is a retired assistant police chief for the Los Angeles Unified School District.

Hutchens was diagnosed with breast cancer in November 2012. She died from breast cancer on January 4, 2021.
