= Mike Carona =

Sheriff-Coroner of Orange County, California, from 1999 to 2008

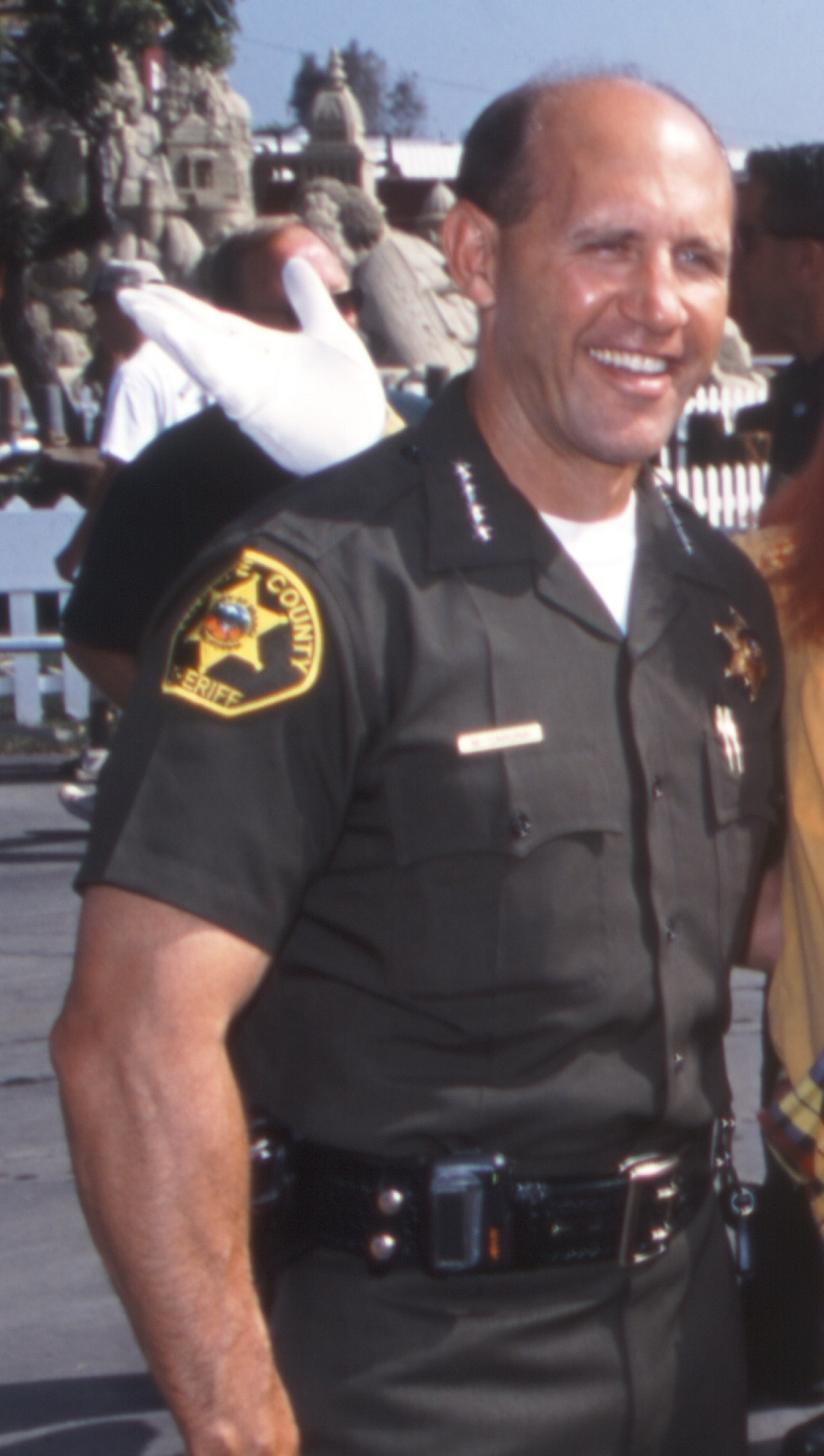
- Carona in 2002

12th Sheriff-Coroner of Orange County, California
- In office 1999–2008
- Preceded by: Brad Gates
- Succeeded by: Jack Anderson (acting); Sandra Hutchens

Personal details
- Born: May 23, 1955 (age 71) Santa Monica, California, U.S.
- Party: Republican
- Criminal information
- Status: Released
- Motive: Obstruction
- Convictions: 16 January 2009
- Criminal charges: Witness tampering
- Penalty: Imprisonment of 66 months

Michael S. Carona (born May 23, 1955) is an American former law enforcement officer, who served as the sheriff-coroner of Orange County, California from 1999 until his resignation in 2008. He gained national prominence during the hunt for the killer of Samantha Runnion. After the quick capture of her murderer, Alejandro Avila, late night television host Larry King dubbed him "America's Sheriff" during an interview.

In late 2007, a federal grand jury indicted Carona, his wife, and his alleged longtime mistress on corruption charges. He resigned effective January 14, 2008, and was convicted on one count of witness tampering, a year later. He was sentenced to 66 months in prison and on January 25, 2011, turned himself in to a federal prison in Colorado to start serving time on the conviction. In May 2015, he was released to his Orange, California, home for home confinement after being released from Federal Medical Center, Lexington and spending time at a halfway house in Los Angeles County.

== Personal life ==
Mike Carona was born on May 23, 1955, in Santa Monica, California. In 1978, Carona graduated from Mount San Antonio College, a community college in Walnut, California, with an Associate of Arts degree and in 1983, he graduated from University of Redlands with a Bachelor of Arts degree. In 1986, Carona received a Master of Arts degree in management, also from the University of Redlands. In 1992, he received another Master of Arts degree in management, this time from California State Polytechnic University, Pomona. Carona graduated from the OCSD training academy in 1976. He was assigned to the County Marshal's Department, where he worked as a deputy for 12 years.

Carona identifies with his Sicilian heritage, having explicitly noted it in his biography on the Orange County Sheriff's Department website. He became a lodge member of the Order of the Sons of Italy in 1999. He is also a member of Mensa.

== Law enforcement ==
In 1988, at the age 33, Carona was appointed as the Marshal of Orange County. After 10 years as Marshal, Carona was elected by popular vote as the Sheriff of Orange County in 1998. Carona ran unopposed during his re-election campaign in 2002 and began his second term in 2003.

In 2003, President George W. Bush appointed Michael Carona to the federal Emergency Response Senior Advisory Committee on Homeland Security. On November 15, 2007, the Department of Homeland Security asked for, and received, Carona's resignation from the task force, citing distractions due to the federal charges he was facing.

California Governor Arnold Schwarzenegger appointed Carona as a commissioner in the California State Athletic Commission in September 2004, citing such achievements as his 3rd degree black belt in Taekwondo. He remained there until August 2005.

On June 6, 2006, Carona was elected to a third term as sheriff.

Carona was also previously chair of the California Council on Criminal Justice.

== Federal indictment and trial ==
On October 30, 2007, the Los Angeles Times reported that Carona had been indicted on federal corruption charges, alleging that he used his office for personal financial gain and urged a former associate, former Assistant Sheriff Donald Haidl, to testify falsely before a grand jury. Federal prosecutors also charged him with instructing an employee in 2005 to lie to investigators about a sexual relationship she had with him as further evidence of tampering with witnesses. The indictment alleged that Carona received gifts including a boat, boxing tickets, and over $112,000 in cash in illegal, unreported gifts. Were he to have been convicted on all counts, Carona could have received 105 years in prison. In the Federal Indictment, Prosecutors alluded to extramarital affairs, titillating the media. A four-part Full Disclosure Network Emmy-nominated TV series featured an exclusive interview with Sheriff Carona immediately following his arraignment and focused on prosecutor tactics and federal sentencing procedures.

=== Trial ===
His trial was initially scheduled to begin on August 26, 2008, in Santa Ana. His attorneys asked for the trial to be delayed an additional two months and the trial was delayed to October 28 because the judge said the case was "so unusual and complex". Carona pleaded not guilty to all charges and claimed he would be vindicated at the trial.

The trial relied prominently on the testimony of Donald Haidl, a former partner of Carona. He has said, "Carona's political team developed 'the friend's list' through which Carona authorized reserve deputy badges in exchange for $1,000 campaign donations." It also features Carona saying of Orange County District Attorney Tony Rackauckas "He just wants to take me out. He thinks I'm weak." The Los Angeles Times reported that more than 12,000 pages of witness statements had been turned over by the government and over 100 witness may be called by the prosecution.

On January 14, 2008, Carona announced that he would resign the sheriff's post to concentrate on his defense. Carona was replaced on an interim basis by Assistant Sheriff Jack Anderson and then replaced permanently by retired Los Angeles County Sheriff's Department Division Chief Sandra Hutchens as the county's 12th sheriff.

=== Conviction ===
On January 16, 2009, a federal jury convicted Carona of a single count of witness tampering and acquitted him of charges of mail fraud, conspiracy, and another count of witness tampering. He could have faced up to twenty years in prison. On April 27, 2009 Carona was sentenced to 66 months in prison.

=== Pension ===
In July 2010, it was revealed that Carona received over $215,000 in pension checks the previous year, despite his felony conviction. Carona became eligible for his pension at age 50. A 2005 state law denies a public pension to public officials convicted of wrongdoing in office. However, that law only applies to benefits accrued after December 2005. Carona is also entitled, by law, to medical and dental benefits.

=== Incarceration ===
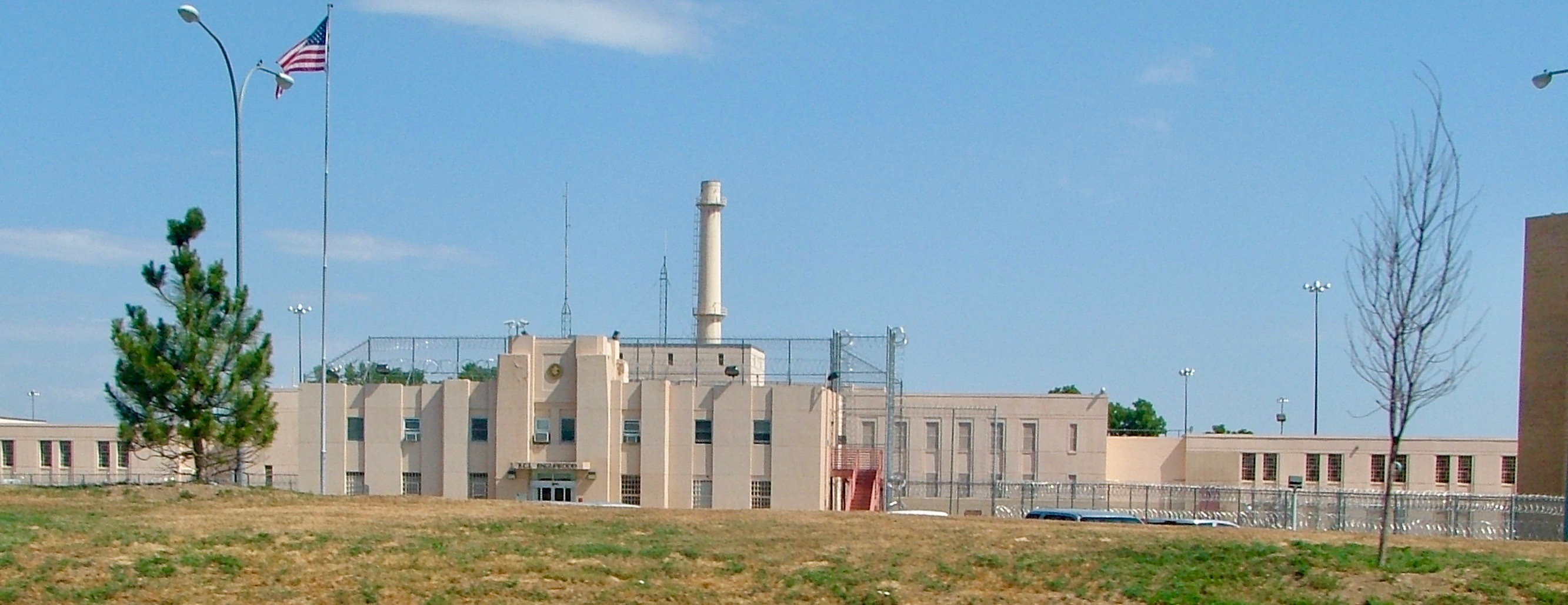
FCI Englewood, where Carona was located

He served five years and six months. Carona's "actual or projected" release date was November 8, 2015. On May 14, 2015, The Orange County Register reported that Carona was released from prison, earlier than expected.
