= Brad Gates =

American law enforcement official (1939–2024)

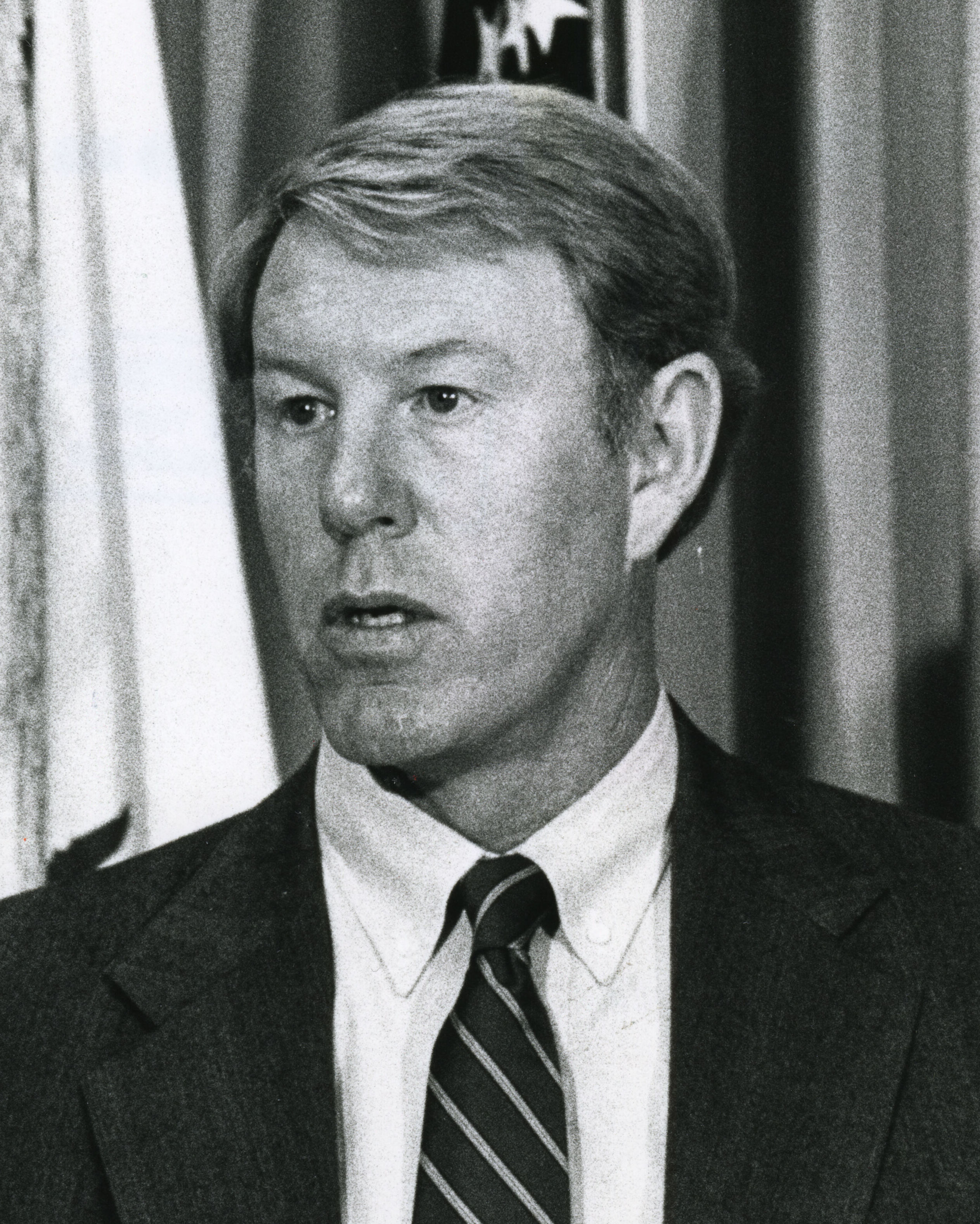
- Gates in 1985

11th Sheriff-Coroner of Orange County, California
- In office 1975–1999
- Preceded by: James A. Musick
- Succeeded by: Mike Carona

Personal details
- Born: March 27, 1939 Orange, California, U.S.
- Died: October 25, 2024 (aged 85)
- Party: Republican
- Spouse: Dee Dee Gates (m. 1961)
- Children: 2
- Education: Orange Coast College; Cal State Long Beach; B.S. and M.S., Criminology

Bradley Lorison Gates (March 27, 1939 – October 25, 2024) was an American law enforcement official who served as the 11th Sheriff-Coroner of Orange County, California, from 1975 until 1999.

== Early life ==
Bradley Lorison Gates was born in Orange, California, on March 27, 1939. He was the third of four children in his family. During his childhood, his family moved to San Juan Capistrano, California, where he would later attend Capistrano Union High School. As a teenager, Gates worked as a paperboy, busboy, and a drugstore janitor. He first studied at Orange Coast College before transferring to California State University, Long Beach, where he received a bachelor's degree and master's degree in criminology. He pursued a doctorate at Claremont Graduate University.

== Career ==
Gates first joined the Orange County Sheriff's Department in 1961. With the pending retirement of longtime Sheriff-Coroner Jim Musick, Gates assembled a campaign for the position in 1974. His campaign received endorsements from Musick and actor John Wayne, a resident of Orange County at the time. On June 4, Gates won the election, receiving 29,093 votes and beating the runner-up by over 23,000 votes. While Gates was a sheriff-elect, he was promoted to undersheriff in a unanimous county board vote on July 9. Gates took the office on January 6, 1975, and proposed a reorganization of the sheriff's department the following day.

By 1997, Gates had lost support from several prominent Republicans due to his proposal that taxes be raised in order to alleviate the 1994 Orange County bankruptcy. Republican state senators Rob Hurtt and John Lewis were among several who switched their allegiances to Mike Carona, a police marshal who announced in March 1997 that he would run against Gates. On October 16, Gates announced at a press conference that he would not seek re-election in 1998.

== Death ==
Gates died on October 25, 2024, at the age of 85.
