= Erica Pratt =

American kidnapping victim

- Born: 1994 or 1995
- Known for: being a Kidnapping Victim and escaping

Erica Pratt (born 1994 or 1995) is an American abduction survivor. She was abducted on May 22, 2002, from a Philadelphia sidewalk, at 7 years old. There was one witness present, a 6-year-old child named Rani Byrd. Rani tried to help Erica, but was pushed to the ground before two men pulled off. When Erica's grandmother called for Erica and her sister, a crying Rani stated that Erica had been kidnapped, but her sister was around the corner. Erica's abductors bound her hands and feet and held her captive in a vacant house until she was able to free herself by gnawing at the tape on her wrists and then smashing a window, a day after the kidnapping. Both Pratt's bravery and the media's handling of the situation attracted considerable attention.

== Reaction and recognition ==
Philadelphia's police inspector William Colarulo commented on Pratt's escape from captivity, stating, "I have twenty-one years in the Police Department, and I have never seen this kind of heroic act of bravery committed by a seven-year-old." Her problem-solving and actions, including her cries for help, have been cited as lessons for others and as an inspiration for female leadership. She was named Time's Person of the Week "as a reminder that not all abductions end in tears". In May 2003, United States Attorney General John Ashcroft presented her with the National Center for Missing and Exploited Children's National Courage Award "for her unyielding persistence and boldness."

In a year that had already seen several other high-profile kidnappings, including Danielle van Dam, Samantha Runnion and Elizabeth Smart, Pratt's story caused several media outlets to consider whether these crimes were actually becoming more commonplace, concluding that reporting was distorting perceptions of their frequency. This case, especially in comparison to those earlier in the year, led to suggestions that the media was selectively reporting about victims on the basis of racial or social class grounds, a claim sometimes generalized as missing white woman syndrome. Salon writer Margot Magowan also suggested the non-sexual nature of the Pratt kidnapping contributed to the media's attention. If raped women were granted the same status as Erica Pratt," she wrote, "there would be no reflex to make them disappear."

== Kidnappers ==
Edward Johnson, who performed the physical kidnapping, and James Burns, the getaway driver, were arrested three days after the kidnapping, which they had committed in an effort to collect ransom money from Pratt's grandmother. The kidnappers chose Erica as their target after a rumor spread about the Pratt family getting life insurance after one of the members was killed in a gang incident. The kidnappers had apparently known the Pratt family before the kidnapping took place, as court records show that Burns was charged for trying to shoot at Erica's uncle Derrick. Burns was wanted for failure to appear in court for this shooting, and Johnson had been previously arrested on drug charges. Johnson was identified by Erica in a lineup, which had led to their conviction for the crime. Johnson pleaded guilty in May 2003 while Burns was convicted a month later.

== In popular culture ==
Comedian Dave Chappelle referenced the Erica Pratt kidnapping, though he didn't use her name, in his 2004 comedy special, For What It's Worth, performed at the San Francisco Fillmore Auditorium, in the sketch, "How Old is Fifteen Really?"

== See also ==
- List of kidnappings
- List of solved missing person cases (post-2000)
- Child abduction scare of 2002
