= Don Barnes (sheriff) =

American sheriff of Orange County, California

13th Sheriff-Coroner of Orange County, California
- Incumbent
- Assumed office January 7, 2019
- Preceded by: Sandra Hutchens

Personal details
- Born: 1965 (age 60–61)
- Police career
- Department: O.C. Sheriff
- Service years: 1989–present
- Rank: Sheriff (2019–present); Undersheriff (2016–2019); Assistant Sheriff (2012–2015); Commander (2010–2012); Captain (2007–2010); Lieutenant (2005–2007); Sergeant (2001–2005); Deputy Sheriff (1989–2001)

Don Barnes (born 1965) is the Sheriff-Coroner of Orange County, California. He was elected to the position on November 5, 2018, and sworn in on January 7, 2019, replacing Sheriff Sandra Hutchens, who had endorsed Barnes shortly after she announced that she would not seek re-election.

== Career ==
Barnes was sworn in as a Deputy Sheriff in 1989. Barnes rose through the ranks of the department. In 2016, he was sworn in as Undersheriff. In 2018, then-Sheriff Sandra Hutchens announced that she would not seek re-election to a third term. She endorsed Barnes for the position. Barnes defeated Duke Nguyen in the 2018 general election. Barnes was sworn in as the 15th Sheriff-Coroner on January 9, 2019.

In 2020 Barnes was a defendant (with Orange County) in Ahlman v. Barnes (and a parallel state action Campbell v. Barnes), filed on 30 April. The case was a class action suit on behalf of medically vulnerable inmates in Orange County Jail, assisted by civil rights organisations. A temporary restraining order (TRO) was granted in part on 26 May, that the defendants follow CDC social distancing guidelines, increase testing and improve sanitation in the jails. The defendants tried multiple times to get a stay on the TRO,, finally being granted a stay by the Supreme Court on 5 August (Barnes v. Ahlman). Justice Sotomayor filed a robust dissent. Litigation continued until 32 May 2022 when the Supreme court denied certiorari. The same day the parties agreed preliminary settlement "the jail would follow CDC guidelines; offer free COVID testing;" a $5 incentive for vaccination; allow more out-of-cell time for quarantined inmates; "increase their recordkeeping; and allow plaintiffs' counsel to monitor conditions via requests for video recordings." Final approval of the agreement and attorney's fees was made on 12 September 2022. The attorney's fees and costs awarded were $714,928.39, simultaneously $2,985,071.61 in fees and costs in Campbell v. Barnes. The cases had taken over two years, and cost the County over $3.7m in plaintiffs costs alone. Due to an oversight, the case wasn't technically closed until 27 July 2023.

Barnes was unopposed for re-election in 2022.

In June 2021, Barnes became the Chairman of the Intelligence Commanders Committee of the Major County Sheriffs of America, the national association of sheriffs from largest counties in the United States. In this capacity, he testified in May 2023 before the U.S. House Homeland Security Subcommittee on Counterterrorism, Law Enforcement, and Intelligence and the U.S. House Homeland Security Subcommittee on Emergency Management and Technology regarding the security challenges facing the United States.

In February 2024, Barnes became Vice President of Homeland Security of the Major County Sheriffs of America.
