= Murder of Samantha Runnion =

Five-year-old girl abducted in 2002

Samantha Runnion
- Born: Samantha Bree Runnion; July 26, 1996; Boston, Massachusetts, U.S.
- Died: July 15, 2002 (aged 5); Cleveland National Forest, Riverside County, California, U.S.
- Cause of death: Homicide by strangulation
- Known for: Murder victim
- Parent(s): Derek Jackson (father); Erin Runnion (mother)

Samantha Bree (Jackson) Runnion (July 26, 1996 – July 15, 2002) was a five-year-old girl abducted from outside her home in Stanton, California, and murdered.

== Kidnapping and murder ==
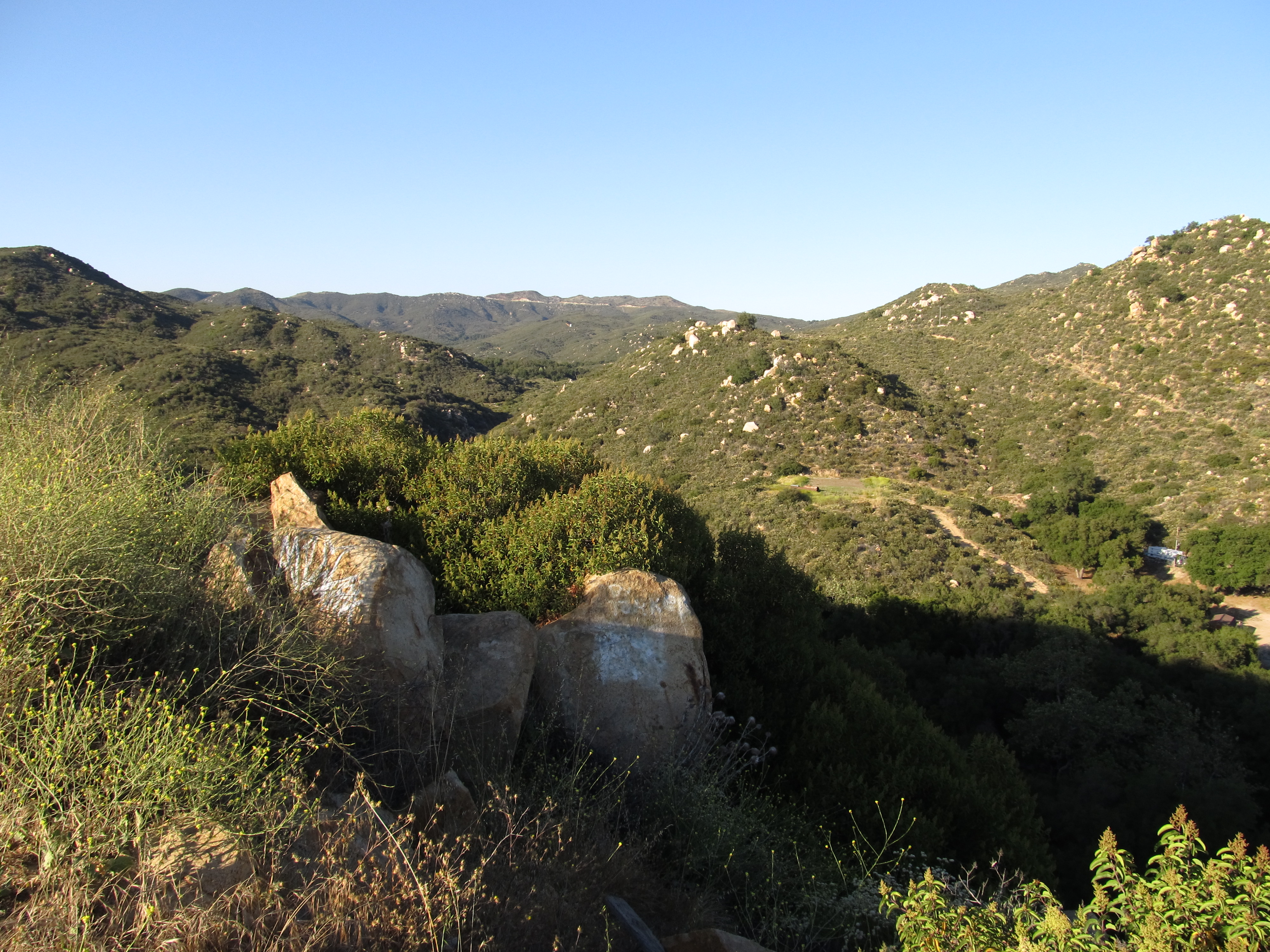
Runnion's body was found in Cleveland National Forest.

On July 15, 2002, Runnion was playing a board game with a friend Sarah in her front yard when a man approached them asking for help in finding his lost dog. After a short conversation, the man grabbed Samantha, forced her into his car, and drove away. A day later, her nude body was found 50 miles (80 km) south in Cleveland National Forest. A coroner's autopsy revealed the murderer had sexually assaulted Runnion both vaginally and anally, and struck her twice in the head, causing cerebral edema, at least 30 minutes before she died. The pathologist determined her cause of death to have been strangulation and asphyxiation, with blunt force trauma as a contributing factor, although the pathologist did not know what method the killer used to asphyxiate Runnion. The pathologist placed Runnion's time of death between 8:00 PM on July 15, and 2:00 AM on July 16.

== Investigation and trial ==
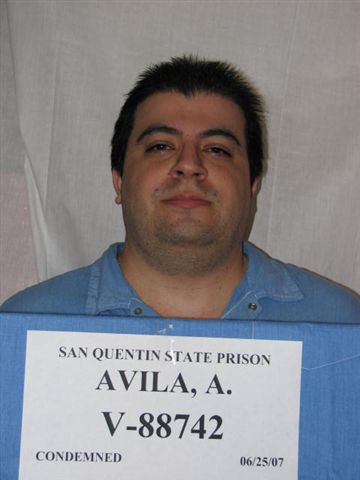
June 2007 mugshot of Avila

Alejandro Avila of Lake Elsinore, California, was arrested three days after the abduction. His DNA was found on Runnion's body, and her DNA was found in his car. Avila had previously visited his girlfriend in the condominium complex where Samantha lived and had been acquitted of molesting his girlfriend's daughter and niece. Police found child sexual abuse material on Avila's laptop computer, and he had booked a motel room on the day of the murder, where it was believed that Runnion was killed. Avila's public defender argued during the trial that he could not have kidnapped the girl, abused, murdered, and then dumped her body 50 miles away in one day as the prosecution believed.

On May 16, 2005, a jury returned a guilty verdict, and Avila was sentenced to death. He is incarcerated at San Quentin State Prison on death row. Samantha's mother, Erin Runnion, launched a foundation called "The Joyful Child Foundation," whose mission is "Preventing crimes against children through programs that educate, empower, and unite families and communities."

Avila has filed multiple appeals since the initial verdict, but none of them have been successful. On November 5, 2026, California governor Gavin Newsom announced that he would commute all of California's active 548 death sentences to sentences of life imprisonment without parole, including Avila's sentence; however, the Supreme Court of California will have to individually approve the commutations in cases where inmates have multiple felony convictions on file, including Avila, who was convicted not only of murder, but of kidnapping and lewd and lascivious acts with a minor.

== See also ==
- Child abduction scare of 2002
- List of kidnappings (2000–2009)
- List of solved missing person cases (2000s)
- List of death row inmates in the United States § California
