= The Saga of the Franklin =

1945 film

- Screenshot: Title frame
- Produced by: United States Navy
- Production companies: Department of the Navy, Office of the Chief of Naval Operations, Naval Observatory.
- Distributed by: United States Navy
- Release date: 1945
- Running time: 24 minutes
- Country: United States
- Language: English

The Saga of the Franklin (1945) is a 16-mm Kodachrome color documentary film produced about the aircraft carrier USS Franklin, nicknamed "Big Ben", one of 24 Essex-class aircraft carriers built during World War II. The aircraft carrier was hit by a Japanese dive bomber on March 19, 1945. The USS Franklin was the most heavily damaged carrier in World War II to survive an attack.

== Synopsis ==
The film traces the operational history of the USS Franklin before focusing on her final mission in 1945. After repair and refitting at Naval Air Station Alameda, California, after an earlier Kamikaze attack, she set out to sea and combat in the South China Sea near Honshu. On March 19, 1945, a single Yokosuka D4Y "Judy" dive bomber bombed the carrier. Some of the most harrowing footage in the film shows the aftermath of the Japanese bombing, when ammunition dumps aboard the carrier caught fire and began to explode.

The Saga of the Franklin ends as a badly damaged USS Franklin, against all odds, reaches the Brooklyn Navy Yard, at New York City for repairs.

== Production ==
The Saga of the Franklin was photographed originally in 16-mm as a silent film by the Department of the Navy, Office of the Chief of Naval Operations. Combat footage including aerial battles and gun camera views were employed, as well as personal accounts of sailors and aviators.

== Reception ==
A sequence in The Saga of the Franklin showing the ship's chaplain, Lieutenant Commander Joseph T. O'Callahan, wearing a steel helmet while administering the last rites to a dying sailor, is one of the most enduring images of World War II in the Pacific. Both O'Callahan and Lieutenant JG Donald A. Gary, were awarded the Medal of Honor for their actions on the USS Franklin.

Not only was the story of the USS Franklin's near-destruction and salvage chronicled in a silent, six-minute black and white newsreel, Bombing of U.S.S. Franklin (1945) distributed by Castle Films, but also was featured later in the documentary, USS Franklin: Honor Restored (2011). Footage of the actual Japanese attack seen in The Saga of the Franklin was included in Task Force (1949) starring Gary Cooper.

== See also ==
- List of World War II documentary films
