= Jay O'Callahan =

American musician and storyteller

- Born: August 15, 1938 (age 87); Brookline, Massachusetts, U.S.
- Education: College of the Holy Cross (BA)
- Occupation: Storyteller

Jay O'Callahan is an American storyteller known for his performances at national and international storytelling festivals and in theaters worldwide. He performs from materials which he himself authors and is known for his large-scale oral stories that explore the rich details and nuances of different cultures and time periods through the perceptions of a central narrative character.

== Biography ==
O'Callahan grew up in Brookline, Massachusetts, near the hospital of the Boston Longwood Medical Area, in a neighborhood which he has fictionalized in his stories as Pill Hill. He is the son of Edward J. and Helen Gately O'Callahan, two teachers who founded the Wyndham Secretarial and Finishing School on Marlborough Street in Boston's Back Bay, a women's secretarial college that sought to teach not only clerical skills but a broader liberal education. In the mid-1940s, his parents bought a 32-room mansion in Pill Hill built in 1883 for Charles Storrow and landscaped by Frederick Law Olmsted. As O'Callahan put it: His childhood neighbors, parents, and other relatives figure prominently in many of his stories.

After graduating from the College of the Holy Cross and unsuccessful attempts at law school and writing novels, O'Callahan found his voice as a professional storyteller in the 1970s. He is considered one of the early proponents of what has been called the American Storytelling Renaissance. He came to national prominence in 1980 with his first appearance at the National Storytelling Festival. In 1996 he was inducted into the Circle of Excellence by the National Storytelling Association (now National Storytelling Network). Jay and his wife Linda are the parents of two children, Ted and Laura. They live in Marshfield, Massachusetts.

== Notable performance venues ==
- National Storytelling Festival, Jonesborough, Tennessee 1980, 1987, 2000, 2002, 2004, and 2007
- Abbey Theatre, Dublin, Ireland
- National Theatre, London, England
- Lincoln Center, New York
- National Public Radio

O'Callahan has performed and recorded with John Langstaff and appeared several times in the character role of an ethnic storyteller in the Christmas Revels. He appeared on a 1980 episode of children's television show Mister Rogers' Neighborhood.

== Stories ==
Most of O'Callahan's early stories were developed from improvised bedtime tales for his two children, and are highly whimsical and showcase O'Callahan's talent for vocal characterization (including giving personalities to inanimate objects), rhythmic verbal poetry, his gentle absurdist humor, and ability to enter into a child's perception of the world. Notable stories of this type include "The Little Dragon", "Tulips", "The Bubble", "The Red Ball", and "Orange Cheeks".

The fictional kingdom of Artana is the setting for several of O'Callahan's tales of childhood adventure and heroism in a magical world set somewhere between Narnia and the island of Shakespeare's The Tempest.

O'Callahan's major breakthrough as an adult storyteller was "The Herring Shed", which depicts the World War II homefront through the perceptions of a young woman working at a fish packing plant in the Canadian Maritimes. Using the verbal singsong rhythm of the work of stringing herring on rods for the smokehouse, the story creates a momentum of a girl finding her social place and sense of self-esteem in this small monotonous work shed, seemly utterly remote from a world at war. But their work is for the war, a war that periodically intrudes in the form of telegrams announcing deaths of relations at the front.

Among O'Callahan's most often requested stories are an ongoing series known as the Pill Hill stories. These are somewhat fictionalized tales of O'Callahan's Irish-Catholic childhood in 1950s Boston, and of his uncle's and aunt's experiences during World War II and its aftermath. Frequently humorous and with a sense of magic and absurdity, these tales are told through the eyes of a young boy, and are tightly focused on the emotional lives of the characters. They nevertheless deal in this microcosm with larger historical and cultural issues including class and ethnic prejudice, politics, the effects of alcohol abuse on family members, the plight of Japanese-Americans during and after World War II, and the complex nature of heroism.

O'Callahan has created other long-form adult stories from factual material, always from the intimate point of view of a central narrative character, and imbued with a sense of the mythic. These include "The Spirit of the Great Auk" a tale of Dick Wheeler's real-life epic kayak trip along the eastern coast of Canada and New England, following the migratory route of the extinct great auk, and encountering its ghostly spirit; "Pouring the Sun", commissioned by Bethlehem, Pennsylvania to commemorate the city's steel-making history; and "Father Joe: A Hero's Journey" the story of his uncle, U.S. Navy chaplain Joseph T. O'Callahan, who saved the USS Franklin (CV-13) after it was set ablaze by Japanese aircraft during World War II.

== Publications ==
Almost all of O'Callahan's oral stories are available on compact disk or audio cassette through his website . Three of the Pill Hill stories, "Pouring the Sun", "Herman and Marguerite", and "Six Stories about Little Heroes" are available on DVD or video.

The Pill Hill stories (in order of publication) are "Chickie", "Glasses", "Politics", "The Dance", "Electra", "Muddy River High", "Equations", "A Good Night's Rest", "Muddy River Playhouse", "Books and Burglars", "Report Card", and "The Labyrinth of Uncle Mark". "Father Joe: A Hero's Journey" is arguably a Pill Hill story, as its principal characters include a youthful college-age Jay O'Callahan and his uncle, Father Joe. However, much of this story is not from the point of view of Oak, O'Callahan's autobiographical character, and none of this story occurs in or references the Pill Hill neighborhood.

Three of O'Callahan's oral stories have been published as illustrated children's books:

- Tulips (illustrated by Debrah Santini)
- Orange Cheeks (illustrated by Patricia Raine)
- Herman and Marguerite: An Earth Story (illustrated by Laura O'Callahan)

Stories by O'Callahan are published the following anthologies:

- The Greatest Generation Speaks: Letters and Reflections by Tom Brokaw ("Father Joe")
- Best Loved Stories Told at the National Storytelling Festival ("Orange Cheeks")
- Ready-to-Tell Tales by David Holt ("The Magic Mortar" a Japanese folktale)
- Chicken Soup for the Grandparent's Soul by Jack Canfield et al. ("Orange Cheeks")
- Chicken Soup for the Gardener's Soul by Jack Canfield et al. ("Brian")
- A Call to Character: A Family Treasury by Colin Greer and Herbert Kohl ("Orange Cheeks")

A Master Class on Storytelling is available on videotape from O'Callahan's website
