= Peter Girard =

American aviator

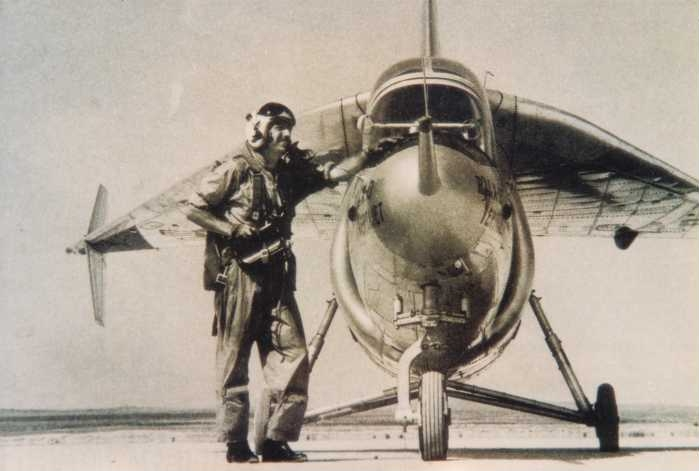
- Girard with the Ryan X-13 Vertijet in 1955, shortly after its first conventional flight.
- Born: May 5, 1918; Monterey, California
- Died: February 12, 2011 (aged 92); La Mesa, California

Peter Frank "Pete" Girard (May 5, 1918 – February 12, 2011) was a United States Army Air Forces pilot, Chief Engineering Test Pilot for Ryan Aeronautical, and the first man to hover in a jet vertical flight. This feat was accomplished on November 24, 1953, during tests that would culminate in the development of the Ryan X-13 Vertijet. He would later accomplish the first full-cycle vertical takeoff, horizontal flight, and vertical landing in a jet aircraft on April 11, 1957, at Edwards Air Force Base. Prior to working with Ryan, Girard worked at Curtiss-Wright in St. Louis, Missouri and served in the United States Army Air Corps during World War II as a Consolidated B-24 Liberator pilot.

== Early life and USAAC ==
Born in 1918 in Monterey, California, Girard was raised on a cattle ranch, first in Cachagua and then in Tularcitos, in the Carmel Valley near the Central Coast of California. Girard was graduated from the University of California, Berkeley with a degree in mechanical engineering, class of 1940. While working at Curtiss-Wright he joined a cadre of like-minded engineers who learned to fly in gliders purchased by the group. During World War II, Girard enlisted in what was then the United States Army Air Corps, and advanced through flight training, becoming a multi-engine heavy bomber pilot flying B-24s. He mustered out of the Air Corps as a Second Lieutenant at San Bernardino, California.

== Chief Engineering Test Pilot ==
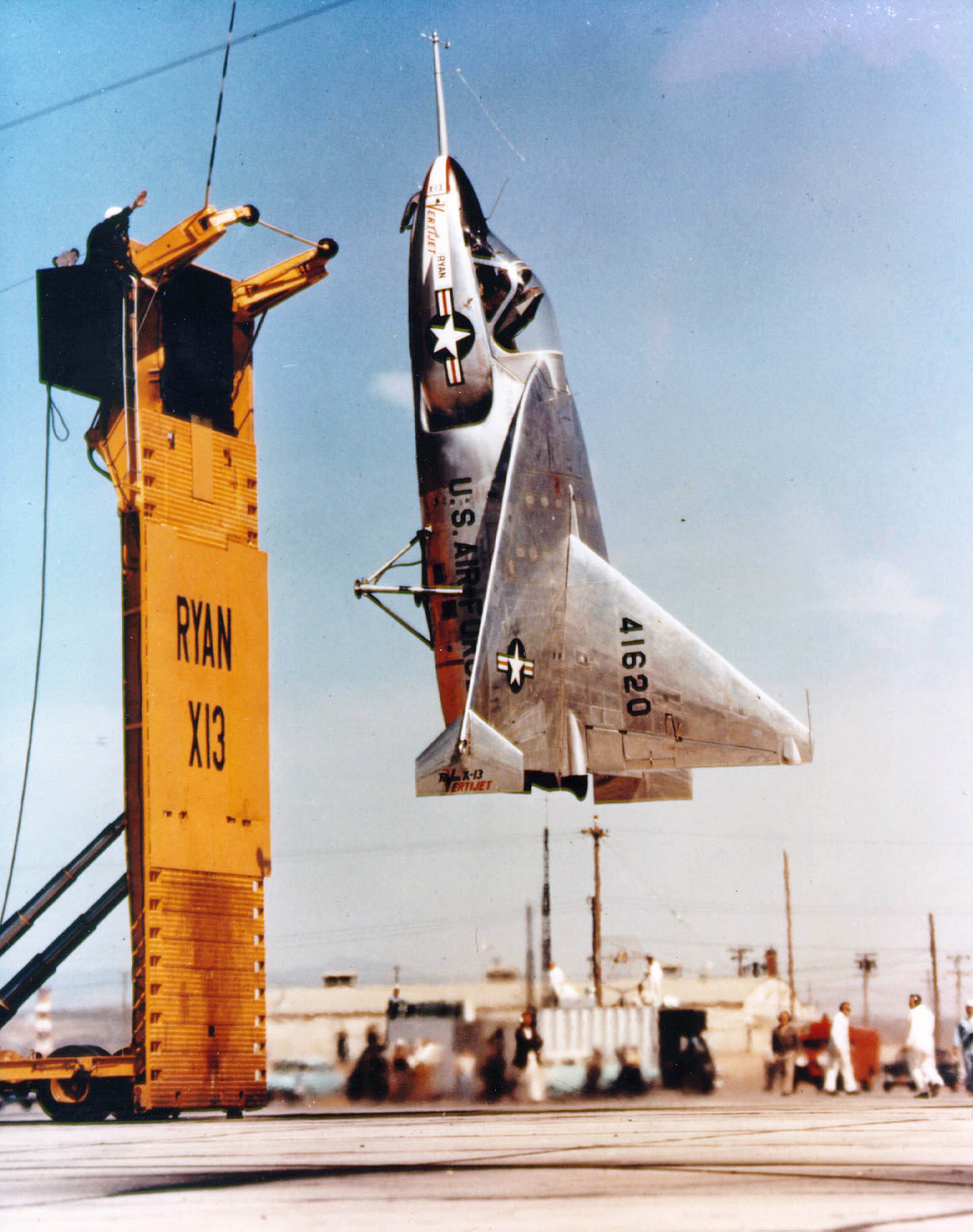
Girard was the test pilot for the Ryan X-13 Vertijet, the first full-cycle vertical takeoff, horizontal flight, and vertical landing jet aircraft.

After his military service, Girard found employment at Ryan Aeronautical in San Diego, initially in the metallurgical department, then as Chief of the Physical Test Section of the Engineering Laboratories, and later as their Chief Engineering Test Pilot. During this time Girard attended the 10th class of the United States Naval Test Pilot School at Naval Air Station Patuxent River, graduating second in his class of 36 as a civilian among military pilots. This prepared him to test a variety of new-concept designs including the Ryan X-13 Vertijet and the Ryan VZ-3 Vertiplane, and he performed test flights at various airfields including Edwards Air Force Base in the Mojave Desert. By this time specializing in vertical and short-take-off aircraft (V/STOL), his most notable moment occurred on July 29, 1957: While demonstrating the capabilities of the X-13, he landed vertically before an audience of some 3,000 officers and journalists at the steps of The Pentagon. After twelve years as Chief Engineering Test Pilot, he then served as Chief of Aerodynamics and Chief of Preliminary Design, finally retiring as Chief of Advanced Products for Aircraft Engineering, where he was responsible for designing remotely piloted air vehicles and other technical innovations. His experiences are recounted in the book Jet Pioneers (Grover Heiman, 1963 Van Rees Press, NY, Chapter 10, "Hanging on Hot Air"), and a segment produced by The History Channel entitled "Secret Superpower Aircraft: Quest for Vertical Take-Off". The X-13, with Girard in the pilot seat, was featured on the cover of the May 20, 1957 issue of Life magazine. The two X-13 aircraft constructed are now in aviation museums; one is in the San Diego Air & Space Museum and the other is in the National Museum of the United States Air Force at Wright-Patterson Air Force Base in Dayton, Ohio. Girard continued his activities in vertical flight and other areas and was awarded more than thirty patents at Ryan Aeronautical and after retirement. His last patent was obtained just a few years before his death.

== Other activities ==
Girard's passion for flight carried over into his personal life. He owned and fabricated sailplanes and experimental aircraft, continued to privately test small aircraft into his sixties, and would design and fabricate prototype components for ultralight aircraft and other unique air vehicles both on his own and in collaboration with others such as Ryan Aeronautical founder Tubal Claude Ryan. His marriage proposal to his wife of more than fifty years, Leslie Girard (née Gehres, daughter of rear admiral Leslie E. Gehres of the USS Franklin), was made aboard a sailplane off Torrey Pines Gliderport.

Girard was the author of at least seven published technical papers, and in 1963, he was awarded the I.B. Laskowitz Gold Medal by the New York Academy of Sciences for a technical paper on VTOL flight. He was an Associate Fellow of the American Institute of Aeronautics and Astronautics. a member of the American Helicopter Society, the Soaring Society of America, and the Associated Glider Club of Southern California. He was a Registered Professional Engineer in the State of California.

== Patents ==
Peter F. Girard, professional engineer of California, had more than 30 patents approved.

- 1961: US3025022 Filed: Jan 16, 1961. Delta Wing Heliplane
- 1962: US3135483 Filed: August 20, 1962. Auxiliary Boom Control System for Rogallo Type Wing Aircraft
- 1962: US3135482 Filed: December 26, 1962. Flexible Wing STOL Assist System for Aircraft
- 1963: US3152778 Filed: Feb 25, 1963. Articulated Spreader Bar Lateral Control System for Flexible Wing Aircraft
- 1963: US3155341 Filed: Apr 5, 1963. Convertiplane
- 1963: US3146970 Filed: July 1, 1963. Heliplane
- 1963: US3306559 Filed: November 4, 1963. Roll Control System for Flexible Wing Aircraft
- 1963: US3203649 Filed: Dec 23, 1963. Rotor Flap High Lift System
- 1964: US3159360 Filed: Jan 20, 1964. Jet Powered VTOL Aircraft. Co-inventor with Tubal Claude Ryan.
- 1964: US3273827 Filed: Apr 27, 1964. Propeller-rotor High Lift System for Aircraft
- 1964: US3269674 Filed: June 26, 1964. Flexible Wing With Pitch Stabilizing Means
- 1964: US3223361 Filed: Oct 5, 1964. Flexible Wing with Integrated Tail Unit
- 1965: USD203523 Filed: Apr 12, 1965. Rotary Wing VTOL Aircraft with Tiltable Secondary Wing. This is an ornamental appearance design patent.
- 1965: USD203524 Filed: Apr 19, 1965. Tandem Wing VTOL Aircraft. This is an ornamental appearance design patent.
- 1965: US3273655 Filed: Aug 2, 1965. Center Body Pivotally Retractable Rotor
- 1966: US3361388 Filed: March 7, 1966. Demountable Aircraft with Flexible Wing
- 1966: US3401906 Filed: May 3, 1966. Gyrochute
- 1966: US3381919 Filed: Jul 25, 1966. Flexible Wing Aerial Delivery System
- 1966: USD211215 Filed: Dec 16, 1966. STOL Utility Aircraft as ornamental appearance design patent.
- 1967: US3464650 Filed: Oct 18, 1967. Aircraft with Flapped Rotor/Wing
- 1968: US3490720 Filed: Nov 26, 1968. STOL AIRCRAFT WITH VARIABLE GEOMETRY ROTOR/WING
- 1970: US3675582 Filed: Aug 5, 1970. Mass Transportation System
- 1970: US3703998 Filed: Dec 28, 1970. Drone Aircraft with Telescopic Fuselage
- 1972: USD230961 Filed: May 22, 1972. Airplane. Co-inventor: T. Claude Ryan. Ornamental appearance design patent.
- 1972: US3827661 Filed: Jul 26, 1972. Aircraft Wing Structure and Method of Assembly. Co-inventor: T. Claude Ryan.
- 1972: US3794273 Filed: Sep 25, 1972. VTOL Rotor Wing Drone Aircraft
- 1972: US3792827 Filed: Nov 10, 1972. VTOL Aircraft with Cruciform Rotor
- 1975: US3986686 Filed: Jun 2, 1975. Aircraft with Retractable Rotor Wing
