= Task Force (film) =

1949 film by Delmer Daves

- theatrical poster
- Directed by: Delmer Daves
- Written by: Delmer Daves
- Produced by: Jerry Wald
- Starring: Gary Cooper; Jane Wyatt
- Narrated by: Gary Cooper
- Cinematography: Robert Burks; Wilfred M. Cline; Paul Mantz (Aerial photography)
- Edited by: Alan Crosland Jr.
- Music by: Franz Waxman
- Color process: Technicolor
- Production company: Warner Bros. Pictures
- Distributed by: Warner Bros. Pictures
- Release dates: August 30, 1949 (premiere); September 30, 1949 (New York City)
- Running time: 116 minutes
- Country: United States
- Language: English
- Budget: $1,893,000
- Box office: $1.8 million (US/Canada rentals) $4,071,000 (worldwide)

Task Force is a 1949 American war film about the development of U.S. aircraft carriers from USS Langley (CV-1) to USS Franklin (CV-13). Although Robert Montgomery was originally considered for the leading role, the film stars Gary Cooper, Jane Wyatt, Walter Brennan, Wayne Morris, Julie London and Jack Holt. Task Force was the only film Gary Cooper and Jane Wyatt made together, and was the last of the eight films Cooper and Walter Brennan made together.

Filmed in black-and-white with some Technicolor sequences, the picture received the complete support of the U.S. Navy, which lent naval vessels and facilities and allowed archival footage of the development of naval air power to be used.

== Plot ==
As a 1917 graduate of the Naval Academy, Naval Aviator Jonathan L. "Scotty" Scott (Gary Cooper) spends 28 years, from 1921 to 1949, promoting U.S. naval aviation and the power of the aircraft carrier. During that period, he antagonizes powerful people in the U.S. Navy and the U.S. Congress, and marries Mary Morgan (Jane Wyatt), the widow of a fellow flier who died in a crash during a carrier takeoff aboard USS Langley (CV-1). Throughout, Scott has the help and friendship of his mentor and superior officer, Pete Richard (Walter Brennan).

The Scotts spend two years in Hawaii and then move to Annapolis, where Scott, now a lieutenant commander, is to teach naval aviation but his outspoken stand in favor of aircraft carriers in combat causes him to lose a promotion. After Japan invades Manchuria, Scott is offered a civilian sales position selling aircraft in Europe, but remains in the Navy.

After Pearl Harbor is attacked by the Japanese, Scott's ship, USS Enterprise, is heavily involved in action at the Battle of Midway. Scott later travels to Washington D.C. to plead for more carriers and eventually a carrier fleet is produced. During the Battle of Okinawa, the fleet, with Scott as the captain of the carrier USS Franklin, proves its worth. When his carrier flight deck is badly damaged by Japanese torpedo aircraft, the ship is forced to withdraw to the U.S. for repairs and the war ends when they arrive in at the Navy Yard in New York City. Four years after the end of the war, Scott, as a rear admiral, retires and joins Mary, who is waiting for him on the dock.

While much of the archive footage used for the ship commanded by Scott was of the USS Franklin, the actual situation more closely resembles the attacks on USS Bunker Hill. Especially as in real life, Franklin had already been knocked out of the war before the invasion of Okinawa began.

== Cast ==
As appearing in Task Force, (main roles and screen credits identified):

- Gary Cooper as Jonathan L. Scott
- Jane Wyatt as Mary Morgan
- Wayne Morris as McKinney
- Walter Brennan as Pete Richard
- Julie London as Barbara McKinney
- Bruce Bennett as Rear Admiral C. Wade McClusky
- Jack Holt as Admiral Joseph M. Reeves
- Stanley Ridges as Senator Bentley
- John Ridgely as Dixie Rankin
- Richard Rober as Jack Southern
- Art Baker as Senator Vincent
- Moroni Olsen as Admiral Ames
- Ray Montgomery as Pilot
- Harlan Warde as Timmy Kissell

=== Uncredited cast ===
- Gregg Barton as Pilot
- Edmond O'Brien as Radio announcer (Note: Edmond O'Brien has a voice-only role as a radio announcer who gives the news of the attack on Pearl Harbor.)
- Mary Lawrence as Ruth Rankin

The use of U.S. Navy gun camera film such as the downing of a Japanese Kawanishi H8K "Emily" flying boat by a Grumman F6F Hellcat, created an authentic look.

== Production ==
In 1948, Warner Bros. Pictures obtained archival U.S. Navy footage documenting the rise of naval aviation as well as Technicolor footage filmed during the war in the Pacific, including the Battle of Midway, the Japanese attack on USS Yorktown and a kamikaze attack on USS Franklin. Encouraged by the offer of support from the U.S. Navy, when the production received permission to proceed with a film, a decision was made to shoot the first segments in black-and-white to merge into the original footage of the USS Langley, the first American aircraft carrier, and USS Saratoga. Principal photography began in late 1948 on the escort carrier, USS Bairoko to replicate USS Langley, as well as Naval Air Station North Island in San Diego. The U.S. Navy provided access to naval facilities with costs amounting to as much as $24,000 a day ($321,600 today) being incurred when an admiral's barge and jet fighters were commandeered. Additional work took place at the Burbank studios to cover interiors and process shots. Production finally wrapped on January 5, 1949.

Near the end of the film, the film changes from black and white to Technicolor in order to unobtrusively use actual combat film shot in color. The change comes just after a scene showing a contentious meeting in Washington D.C. in which Brennan and Cooper argue with a senator who wants to stop building carriers. After some aerial shots of a task force at sea and an aircraft landing on a carrier, still in black-and-white, a shot of a sailor in combat gear silhouetted against the sky is in color, but filtered to make it sepia, a technique similar to that used on the transitional shot of Dorothy opening the door of her house to reveal Munchkinland in The Wizard of Oz. This is followed by Cooper at night walking the deck of his first command, still in sepia, and aircraft taking off at night. The next shot, of a naval task force with air cover, is in full color.

Complications set in during the filming of Task Force as consecutively, four separate crews were at work with the resultant task of merging all of the live action and archival footage. One of the near disasters involved a delivery truck that caught on fire with its load of cut and stock film along with daily rushes, personal baggage and makeup destroyed. More serious was a series of accidents involving the star, who had already expressed reservation both about the script and his perceived inadequacies as an actor. In December 1948, Cooper was on a navy barge that broke down in fog, and began to take on water, almost foundering on the rocks in Long Beach harbor before he was rescued by a navy ship. Cooper was subsequently hospitalized with a high fever. He was nearly seriously injured on another occasion. During gunnery practice, when Cooper was on USS Antietam, an unmanned target aircraft was hit and caught fire, heading for the crowded deck where all of the actors and crew were standing before skimming overhead, and crashing in the ocean. Wayne Morris who portrayed Lt. McKinney was the only actual carrier pilot in the cast and served on the USS Essex, becoming an "Ace" by shooting down 7 Japanese planes and assisting in the sinking of 5 Japanese ships.

=== Historical accuracy ===
During the Battle of Midway scene, the "Japanese carrier" blowing up is actually HMS Barham exploding after being torpedoed by U-331.

When Cooper and Brennan attend the mid-1920s reception in Washington, D.C., the Chief of Naval Operations is called "Admiral Ames" (Moroni Olsen); the real CNO was Admiral Edward Walter Eberle. The movie CNO is clean shaven, Eberle had a full beard. Seen listening to Scott (Gary Cooper) tell Sen. Bentley (Stanley Ridges) about the use of aircraft carriers over battleships in future naval warfare and that Japan is a threat to the United States, the real Japanese naval attaché who would have heard that conversation was Captain Isoroku Yamamoto. Later, Admiral Yamamoto would be the architect of the attack on Pearl Harbor.

While Cooper's character Scott is shown as captain of the carrier USS Franklin at the Battle of Okinawa, the ship was actually commanded by Captain Leslie E. Gehres.

=== Aircraft used in the film ===
Paul Mantz did much of the flying in the early aerial sequences.

- Boeing B-17 Flying Fortress
- Boeing Model 100 standing in for a Curtiss F8C-2 Helldiver
- Curtiss F8C-2 Helldiver
- Curtiss P-36 Hawk standing in for a Mitsubishi A6M Zero
- Douglas SBD Dauntless
- Douglas TBD Devastator
- Grumman F4F Wildcat
- Grumman F6F Hellcat
- Grumman F9F Panther
- Grumman TBM Avenger
- Kawanishi H8K
- Mitsubishi A6M Zero
- Nakajima B6N
- Orenco Model F standing in for a Vought VE-7
- Vought SB2U Vindicator
- Vought VE-7

=== In popular culture ===
In the film, White Heat, when Arthur "Cody" Jarrett played by James Cagney is chased by federal investigators, to lose them, he drives the car into San-Val Drive In, where Task Force is showing. Later in the movie, when Cody's mother is interrogated by the cops, she says that she was with Verna (Virginia Mayo) watching the film and that it was "exciting."

== Reception ==
Special premieres were screened on USS Midway at sail in the Atlantic and USS Valley Forge in the Pacific. When released years after the end of World War II, Task Force was inevitably compared to wartime features and documentaries that chronicled the efforts of the U.S. Navy. Audiences on a whole, received the film enthusiastically, making it one of the "largest grossing pictures" of the postwar era.

According to Warner Bros records, the film earned $2,481,000 domestically and $1,590,000 foreign.

Bosley Crowther of The New York Times noted that when the film concentrates on "real carrier activity out at sea and the actual aspects of recent warfare, it springs into vivid, thrilling life." Playing on the propaganda-like message of Task Force, Radio Moscow decried it, "a film which glorifies war, and calls for the militarization of the country's whole life."
