= USS O'Callahan =

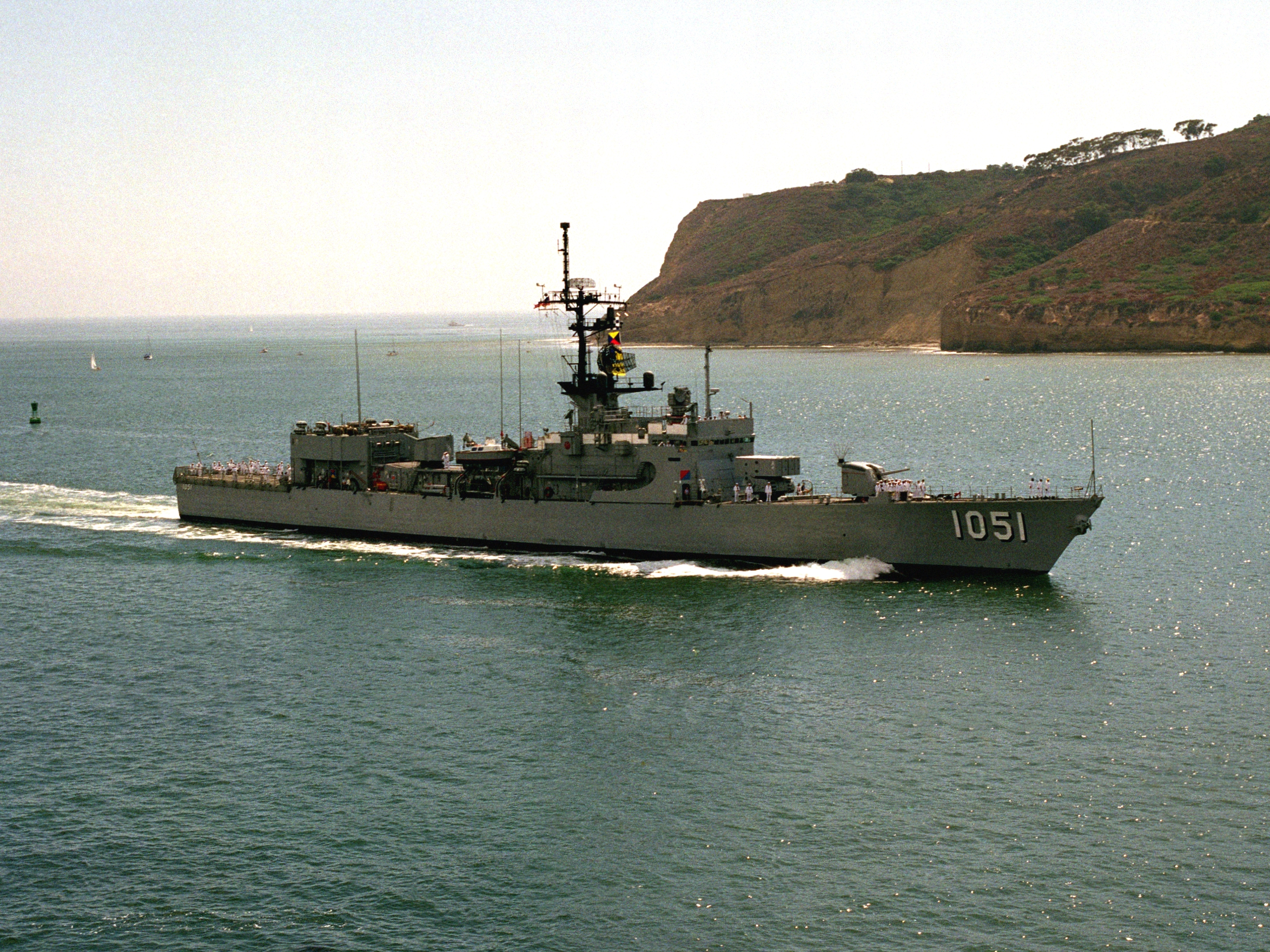
- USS O'Callahan

History

United States
- Name: O'Callahan
- Namesake: Joseph T. O'Callahan
- Ordered: 21 March 1963
- Builder: Defoe Shipbuilding Company, Bay City, Michigan
- Laid down: 19 February 1964
- Launched: 20 October 1965
- Acquired: 1 July 1968
- Commissioned: 13 July 1968
- Decommissioned: 20 December 1988
- Stricken: 29 November 1993
- Motto: Faithful and Brave
- Fate: Sold to Trusha Investments Pte. Ltd, c/o Jacques Pierot, Jr. & Sons, Inc., of New York City for over $600,000. Scrapped in Hong Kong.

Pakistan
- Name: Aslat
- Acquired: 8 February 1989 (leased)
- Out of service: 11 December 1993
- Identification: F265
- Fate: Returned to US, 11 December 1993

General characteristics
- Class & type: Garcia-class frigate
- Displacement: 2,624 tons (light); 3,400 tons full
- Length: 414 ft 6 in (126.34 m)
- Beam: 44 ft 1 in (13.44 m)
- Draft: 24 ft 6 in (7.47 m)
- Propulsion: 2 Foster-Wheeler boilers, 1 General Electric turbine, 35,000 shp (26,000 kW), single screw
- Speed: 27 knots (50 km/h; 31 mph)
- Range: 4,000 nmi (7,400 km; 4,600 mi) at 20 kn (37 km/h; 23 mph)
- Complement: 16 officers; 231 enlisted
- Sensors & processing systems: AN/SPS-40 air search radar; AN/SPS-10 surface search radar; AN/SQS-26 bow mounted sonar
- Armament: 2 × single 5 in (127 mm)/38 cal. Mk 30 guns; 1 × 8-tube ASROC Mk 16 launcher (16 missiles); 2 × triple 12.75 in (324 mm) Mk 32 torpedo tubes, Mk 46 torpedoes; 2 × MK 37 torpedo tubes (fixed, stern) (removed later)
- Aircraft carried: Gyrodyne QH-50 (planned) / SH-2 LAMPS

USS O'Callahan (FF-1051) was a U.S. Navy Garcia-class destroyer escort, later reclassified as a frigate. She was named for Chaplain Lieutenant Commander Joseph T. O'Callahan, a World War II Medal of Honor recipient for his rescue of crewmen on the aircraft carrier Franklin after it was hit and severely damaged by enemy bombs.

== History ==
O'Callahan was laid down on 19 February 1964 at the Defoe Shipbuilding Company in Bay City, Michigan and was launched on 20 October 1965. She was sponsored by Chaplain O'Callahan's sister, Sister Rose Marie O'Callahan of the Philippines Maryknoll College, the first nun to sponsor a U.S. Navy ship. She was commissioned on 13 July 1968 at the Boston Naval Shipyard, Boston, Massachusetts, with Captain Robert L. Brown commanding.

On 16 August 1968, after her fitting-out at Boston, O'Callahan departed for her homeport of San Diego, California. En route she called at Norfolk, Virginia; Charleston, South Carolina; and Fort Lauderdale, Florida. She stood out of San Diego on 1 October for 25 days of electronics and weapons systems tests off the Pacific Northwest, then commenced shakedown on 4 November. After at-sea training operations off the Hawaiian Islands from 6 through 17 February 1969, she entered the Long Beach Naval Shipyard on 4 March for post-shakedown availability through mid-May. She then conducted further training operations out of San Diego in preparation for her first deployment to the Western Pacific.

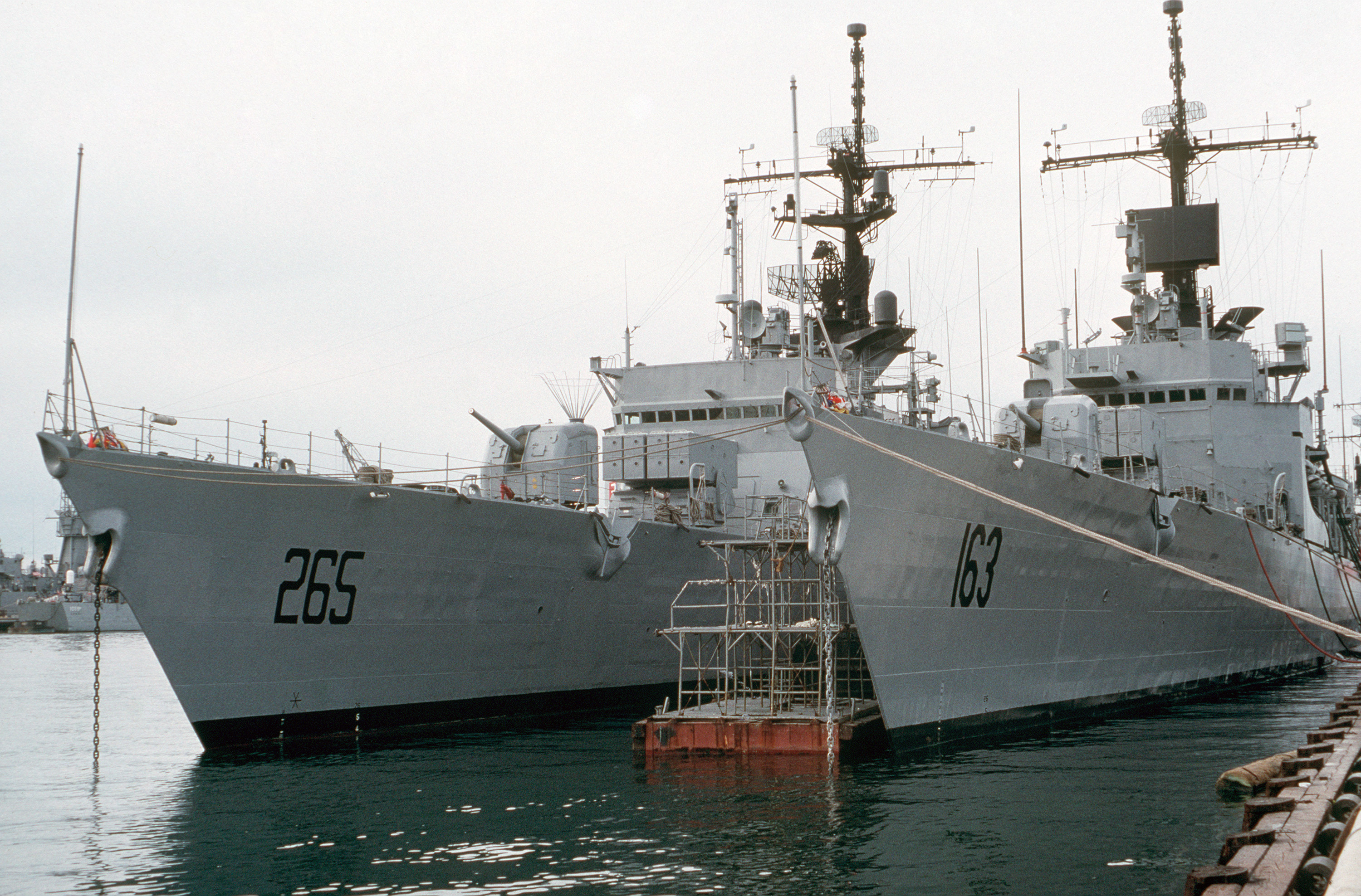
Former Brooke (right) and O'Callahan (left) during service with Pakistan.

[1969-1989]

On 30 June 1975 O'Callahan was reclassified as a frigate and given the designation FF-1051.

== Pakistan service ==
O'Callahan served until 31 May 1989, when she was decommissioned and leased to Pakistan. However, following Pakistan's refusal to halt its nuclear weapons program, the lease was cancelled in 1994. She was returned to United States custody at Singapore on 19 August 1994 and stricken from the Navy Register the same day. On 9 September she was transferred to the Maritime Administration and sold to Trusha Investments Pte. Ltd, c/o Jacques Pierot, Jr. & Sons, Inc., of New York City for over $600,000. She was then towed to Hong Kong and scrapped.
