= Joseph T. O'Callahan =

US Navy officer, chaplain, recipient of the Medal of Honor

Joseph Timothy O'Callahan
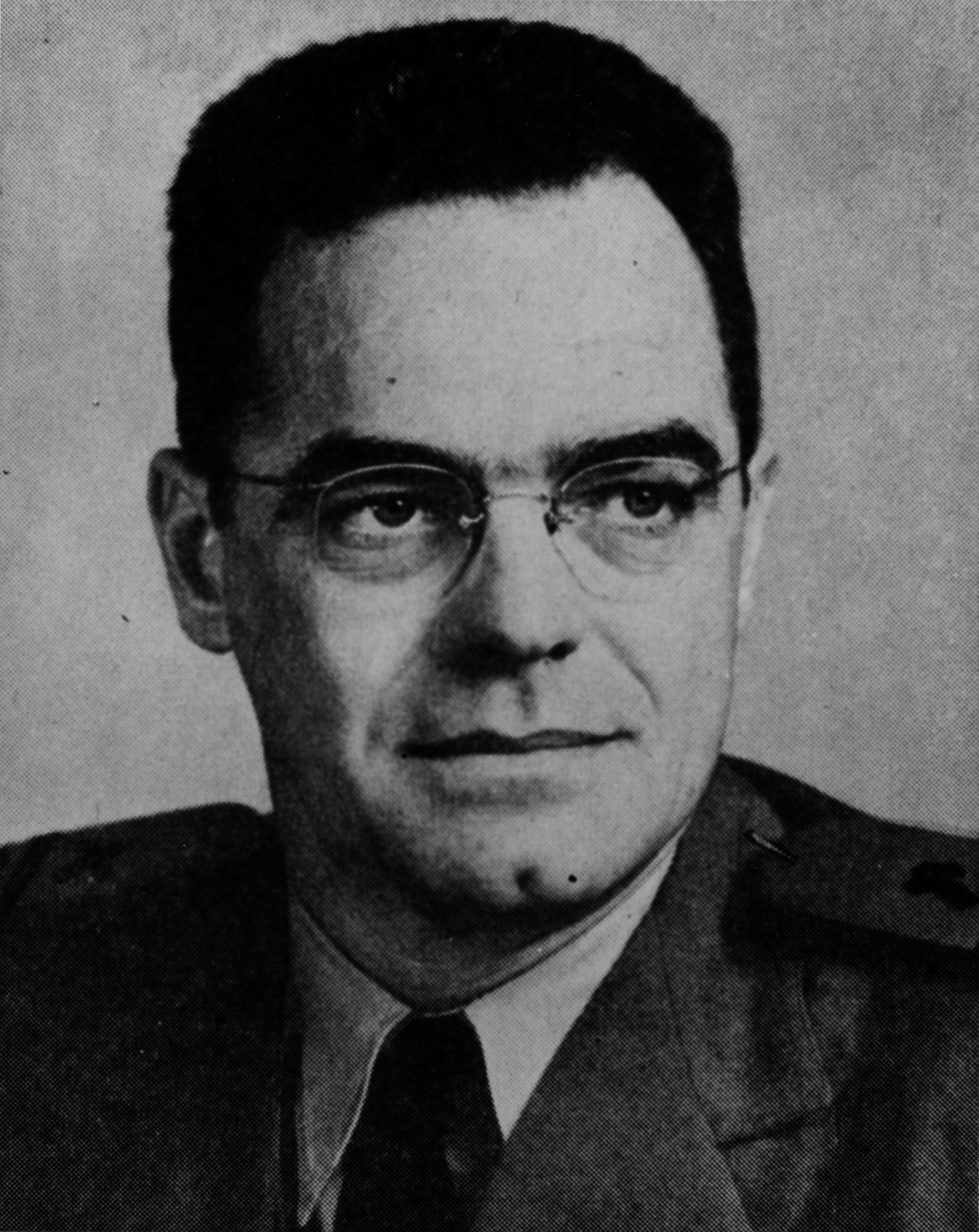
- Joseph T. O'Callahan, 1945.
- Born: May 14, 1905; Boston, Massachusetts
- Died: March 18, 1964 (aged 58); Worcester, Massachusetts
- Burial place: College of the Holy Cross Cemetery, Worcester, Massachusetts
- Military career
- Allegiance: United States
- Branch: United States Navy
- Service years: 1940–1946 (active); 1946–1953 (reserve)
- Rank: Captain
- Nickname: "Father Joe"
- Units: Navy Chaplain Corps; USS Franklin
- Conflicts: World War II: Attack on Kure (March 1945)
- Awards: Medal of Honor
- Other work: Jesuit priest

The Reverend Joseph Timothy O'Callahan SJ

Ecclesiastical career
- Religion: Roman Catholic
- Church: Latin Church
- Ordained: 1934
- Writings: I Was Chaplain on the Franklin (1961)

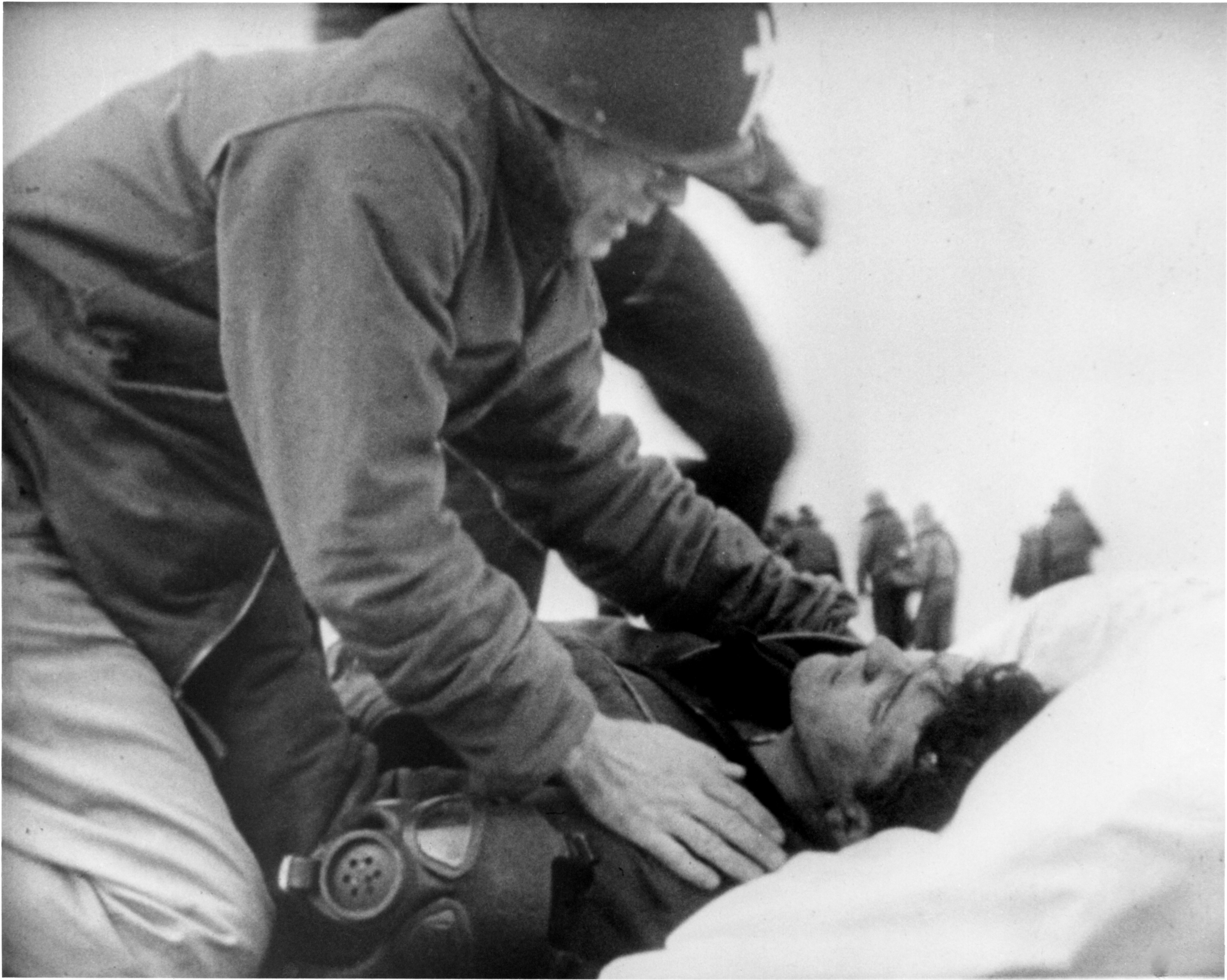
Chaplain Joseph O'Callahan ministers to an injured man aboard USS Franklin, 1945.

Joseph Timothy O'Callahan (May 14, 1905 – March 18, 1964) was a Jesuit priest and, during World War II, a United States Navy chaplain. He was awarded the U.S. military's highest decoration, the Medal of Honor, for his actions during and after an attack on the aircraft carrier aboard which he was serving, USS Franklin.

== Early years and career ==
O'Callahan was born on May 14, 1905, in the Roxbury neighborhood of Boston, Massachusetts. He joined the Society of Jesus (Jesuits) in 1922, shortly after graduating from Boston College High School. He began the 13 years of training required of a Jesuit at St. Andrew's College, Poughkeepsie, New York, where he received the Bachelor of Arts degree in 1925 and his Master of Arts degree in 1929, specializing in mathematics and physics in addition to religious philosophy. He was ordained to the Roman Catholic priesthood as a member of the Jesuit order in 1934. He was a professor of mathematics, philosophy, and physics at Boston College from 1927 to 1937. He then spent a year (1937–1938) as a professor of philosophy at Weston Jesuit School of Theology (Weston College). He served as the director of the Mathematics Department at the College of the Holy Cross in Worcester, Massachusetts from 1938 to 1940.

Among his students at Holy Cross was John V. Power, who would himself be awarded the Medal of Honor, although posthumously, during World War II. After the war, while O'Callahan was a patient at Saint Vincent Hospital, he was tended to by Power's sister, Patricia Power Rose, a nurse.

== Military service ==
Appointed lieutenant (junior grade) in the Chaplain Corps of the U.S. Navy Reserve on August 7, 1940, Chaplain O'Callahan advanced progressively in rank and attained that of commander in July 1945. His first assignment at sea was on USS Ranger, participating in Operation Torch off North Africa in 1942 and Operation Leader off Norway in 1943.

While in active service, O'Callahan reported aboard USS Franklin on March 2, 1945. 17 days later, the ship was severely damaged at dawn by two bombs from a lone Japanese aircraft. The hangar deck immediately became an inferno of exploding gas tanks and ammunition. Although wounded by one of the explosions after the attack, Chaplain O'Callahan moved about the exposed and slanting flight deck, administering the last rites to the dying, comforting the wounded, and leading officers and crewmen into the flames to carry hot bombs and shells to the edge of the deck for jettisoning. He personally recruited a damage control party and led it into one of the main ammunition magazines to wet it down and prevent its exploding. For this action he received the Navy Cross, which he publicly refused (the only man to do so in World War II). At the time, it was speculated that O'Callahan was offered the Navy Cross in lieu of the Medal of Honor since his heroic actions on USS Franklin highlighted perceived lapses in leadership by the ship's commanding officer, Captain Leslie E. Gehres, which reflected poorly on the Navy. President Harry Truman intervened after the resulting public outcry and the Medal of Honor was awarded to O'Callahan on January 23, 1946. He was the first Naval Chaplain so decorated.

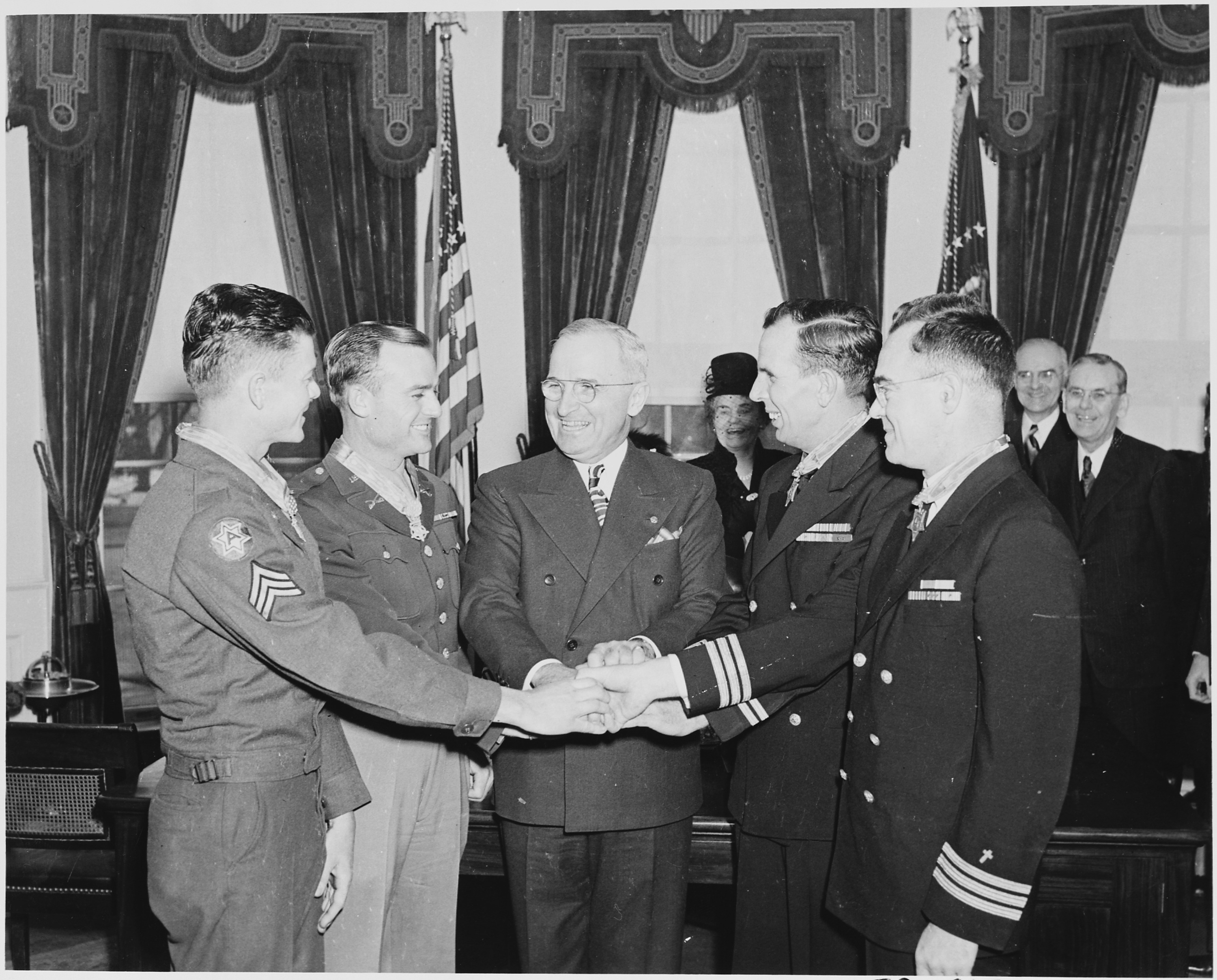
O'Callahan (right) with President Harry S. Truman (center) and other Medal of Honor recipients at their medal presentation ceremony in 1946.

== Medal of Honor citation ==
O'Callahan's official citation reads:

For conspicuous gallantry and intrepidity at the risk of his life above and beyond the call of duty while serving as chaplain on board the U.S.S. Franklin when that vessel was fiercely attacked by enemy Japanese aircraft during offensive operations near Kobe, Japan, on 19 March 1945. A valiant and forceful leader, calmly braving the perilous barriers of flame and twisted metal to aid his men and his ship, Lt. Comdr. O'Callahan groped his way through smoke-filled corridors to the open flight deck and into the midst of violently exploding bombs, shells, rockets, and other armament. With the ship rocked by incessant explosions, with debris and fragments raining down and fires raging in ever-increasing fury, he ministered to the wounded and dying, comforting and encouraging men of all faiths; he organized and led firefighting crews into the blazing inferno on the flight deck; he directed the jettisoning of live ammunition and the flooding of the magazine; he manned a hose to cool hot, armed bombs rolling dangerously on the listing deck, continuing his efforts, despite searing, suffocating smoke which forced men to fall back gasping and imperiled others who replaced them. Serving with courage, fortitude, and deep spiritual strength, Lt. Cmdr. O'Callahan inspired the gallant officers and men of the Franklin to fight heroically and with profound faith in the face of almost certain death and to return their stricken ship to port.

== Awards and decorations ==

1st row	Medal of Honor	Purple Heart	Combat Action Ribbon
2nd row	American Defense Service Medal with 1 Service star	American Campaign Medal	Asiatic-Pacific Campaign Medal with 1 Campaign star
3rd row	European-African-Middle Eastern Campaign Medal with 3 Campaign stars	World War II Victory Medal	National Defense Service Medal

== Later life ==
O'Callahan returned to Holy Cross in the fall of 1948 as the head of the Mathematics Department. He died on March 16, 1964, and is buried in the Jesuit cemetery on campus. His Medal of Honor resides in the Archives at The College of the Holy Cross.

In 1956, O'Callahan wrote an account of the attack titled I was Chaplain on the Franklin. His service is also recounted in the story "Father Joe" by his nephew, storyteller Jay O'Callahan.

USS O'Callahan (DE-1051), a U.S. Navy destroyer escort later re-classified as a frigate, was named in his honor.

== See also ==
- List of Chaplain Corps Medal of Honor recipients
- List of Medal of Honor recipients for World War II
- Roman Catholic Archdiocese for the Military Services, USA § World War II
