= Leslie E. Gehres =

US Navy admiral (1898–1975)

Leslie Edward Gehres
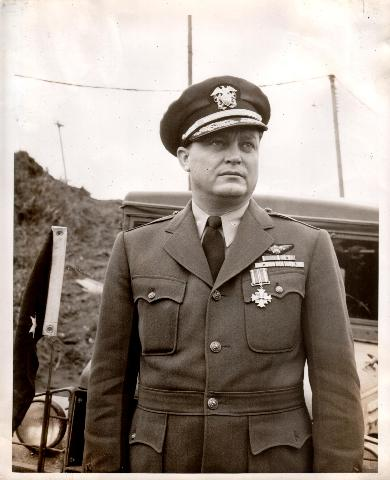
- Born: September 23, 1898; Newark, New York, U.S.
- Died: May 15, 1975 (aged 76); San Diego, California, U.S.
- Relatives: Peter Girard (son-in-law)
- Military career
- Allegiance: United States of America
- Branch: United States Navy
- Service years: 1914–1949
- Rank: Rear Admiral
- Commands: Naval Air Station San Diego; USS Franklin; Fleet Air Wing 4
- Conflicts: World War I World War II: Aleutian Islands Campaign; Philippines Campaign; Battle of Okinawa
- Awards: Navy Cross; Legion of Merit (2); Distinguished Flying Cross; Purple Heart

Leslie Edward Gehres (23 September 1898 – 15 May 1975) was a naval aviator who reached the rank of rear admiral in the United States Navy, being one of the "mustang" officers who rose from enlisted man to admiral's rank. He is most noted as commanding officer of the aircraft carrier USS Franklin, which was badly damaged by a Japanese air attack in March 1945, where his leadership tenure has been seen as a "a cautionary tale about the scourge of 'toxic leadership'."

== Early military career ==
Leslie Gehres was born on 23 September 1898, as a son of Charles Peter and Phoebe Ann Gehres. He attended Western High School in Rochester, New York, and Union High School in Newark, New York, before he enlisted with the permission of his mother in the New York Naval Militia in 1914. He was assigned to the 6th Division, Third Battalion.

With the entry of the United States into World War I his unit was mobilized on 6 April 1917 and he served on the cruiser USS Salem and on battleships USS Massachusetts and USS Indiana, where he received further naval training.

Gehres was then assigned to the Fourth Reserve Officers Class at United States Naval Academy at Annapolis, Maryland. Upon completion of the course, he was commissioned ensign in the United States Naval Reserve on 24 May 1918.

He was transferred to the Regular Navy in September 1918, where he served aboard the battleship USS North Dakota, which operated on escort duty with Atlantic Fleet. He stayed aboard this ship until June 1919, when he was transferred to destroyers.

== Interwar period ==
For the next five years, Gehres served aboard destroyers USS Tingey, USS Gillis, USS Aulick and USS Jacob Jones. In June 1924, Gehres was transferred to the Navy Yard at Pearl Harbor, Hawaii, where he served until November 1926, when he was assigned to the Naval Air Station at San Diego.

Thereafter, Gehres was transferred to the Naval Air Station Pensacola, Florida, where he reported for naval flight training. He was designated a Naval Aviator on August 30, 1927.

== World War II ==
Gehres was appointed commander of Patrol Wing 4 on 1 November 1941.

Every flight was a flight that the crew should not have returned from. Every man knew this and yet none wavered.

— Captain Leslie E. Gehres, Commander, Fleet Air Wing 4

Gehres had spent most of World War II in the Aleutians, "where men had nicknamed him Custer for his aggressive air wing tactics and what many thought was erratic behavior". There, he rose to the rank of Commodore, the first aviator to achieve this rank.

=== Captain of USS Franklin ===
Gehres took a step down in rank to command an aircraft carrier, supposedly as he desired a shot against Imperial Japan. On 7 November 1944, Gehres took command of USS Franklin, relieving Captain J. M. Shoemaker at the change of command ceremony, where Gehres also criticized the crew for failing to shoot down the kamikaze that had damaged their ship. Gehres was a strict disciplinarian whose autocracy was disliked by many of Franklin's crew, and some even consider his leadership as "toxic".

In 1945, Franklin made airstrikes on the Japanese homeland in support of the Okinawa landings, later launching sweeps and strikes against Kagoshima and Izumi on southern Kyūshū.

Before dawn on 19 March 1945, Franklin, which had maneuvered to within 50 miles (80 km) of the Japanese mainland, closer than any other U.S. carrier during the war, launched a fighter sweep against Honshū and later a strike against shipping in Kobe Harbor. After being called to battle stations twelve times within six hours that night, Gehres downgraded the alert status to Condition III, allowing his men freedom to eat or sleep, although gunnery crews remained at their stations.

In those days, radar was not entirely reliable or capable of sensing planes in clouds and this caused problems on this occasion, with short-term blips appearing on screen, then disappearing again. Despite receiving a last-minute warning of a "bogey" from USS Hancock, Gehres never ordered Franklin to general quarters, possibly for this reason. This "bogey" turned out to be a single Japanese aircraft that pierced the cloud cover and made a low-level run on the ship to drop two semi-armor-piercing bombs. The resulting fire and explosions killed 807 and wounded more than 487, the total casualties representing over a third of the carrier's personnel complement. Franklin had suffered the most severe damage and highest casualties experienced by any U.S. fleet carrier that survived World War II.

Gehres, along with ten of his officers and a single enlisted man from Franklin's crew and air group, were subsequently awarded the Navy Cross for heroism in coping with Franklin's battle damage and keeping the ship afloat. However, many members of the crew did outstanding work in carrying out actions, of their own volition, which played a major part in saving lives and enabling the survival of the vessel.

Joseph T. O'Callahan, a Jesuit priest and Navy chaplain on Franklin, was also offered the Navy Cross for his actions during the attack but turned it down. Speculation at the time was that O'Callahan was offered the Navy Cross in lieu of the Medal of Honor since his heroic actions on Franklin highlighted perceived lapses in leadership by Gehres, which reflected poorly on the Navy. President Harry Truman intervened after the resulting public outcry and the Medal of Honor was awarded to O'Callahan on January 23, 1946.

Upon Franklin's arrival in New York, a long-brewing controversy over the ship's crew's conduct during her struggles finally came to a head. Captain Gehres had accused many of those who had left the ship on 19 March 1945 of desertion, despite the fact that those who had jumped into the water to escape had done so to prevent a likely death by fire, or had been led to believe that "abandon ship" had been ordered. While en route from Ulithi Atoll to Hawaii, Gehres had proclaimed 704 members of the crew to be members of the "Big Ben 704 Club" for having stayed with the heavily damaged warship, but investigators in New York discovered that only about 400 were actually onboard Franklin continuously. The others had been brought back on board either before or during the stop at Ulithi. All of the charges against the men of her crew were quietly dropped.

According to the 2011 documentary USS Franklin: Honor Restored, Gehres was universally excoriated for his leadership deficiencies and his tendency to blame his crew for the near loss of his ship. Several men, including wounded, who had been blown off the ship by its huge explosions were later refused re-entry onto the ship. Gehres threatened to court martial men who had been blown overboard, because they had not been given the order to abandon ship.

Gehres's actions during this time led him to be described by War is Boring as "a cautionary tale about the scourge of 'toxic leadership.'" He was relieved as captain of the Franklin in July 1945, less than two months before Japan's unconditional surrender, and reassigned as Commander, Naval Air Station San Diego.

== Postwar ==
Following the end of World War II, Gehres gained a second star as he was promoted to the rank of Rear Admiral, but he received no further overseas assignments, and never commanded any U.S. Navy vessel again. His final three years in the U.S. Navy were spent as Commanding Officer, Naval Air Station San Diego (NAS North Island) from July 16, 1945, to September 18, 1948 - the largest Naval Air Complex in the United States Navy during WWII.

After retiring from the Navy in 1948, Gehres went into business with Ryan Aeronautical Company, now a division of Northrop Grumman, in San Diego, California. He later became general manager of the National Marine Terminal Company. In 1950, with Robert C. Wilson as his campaign manager, Gehres ran for Congress from San Diego and lost. Two years later, they switched roles and won.

Gehres was chairman of the San Diego County Republican Central Committee for 12 years, organizing support for former Governor (later President) Ronald Reagan, former Senator George Murphy and former Presidents Dwight D. Eisenhower and Richard M. Nixon.

He died in May 1975, at the age of 76.

== Decorations ==
Here is the ribbon bar of Rear Admiral Leslie E. Gehres:

Naval Aviator Badge
1st Row	Navy Cross		Legion of Merit with Gold Star and "V" Device
2nd Row	Distinguished Flying Cross	Navy Commendation Medal	Purple Heart
3rd Row	World War I Victory Medal with Escort Clasp	American Defense Service Medal with Fleet Clasp	American Campaign Medal
4th Row	Asiatic Pacific Campaign Medal with three service stars	World War II Victory Medal	Philippine Liberation Medal
