= Donald A. Gary =

US Navy officer, recipient of the Medal of Honor

Donald Arthur Gary
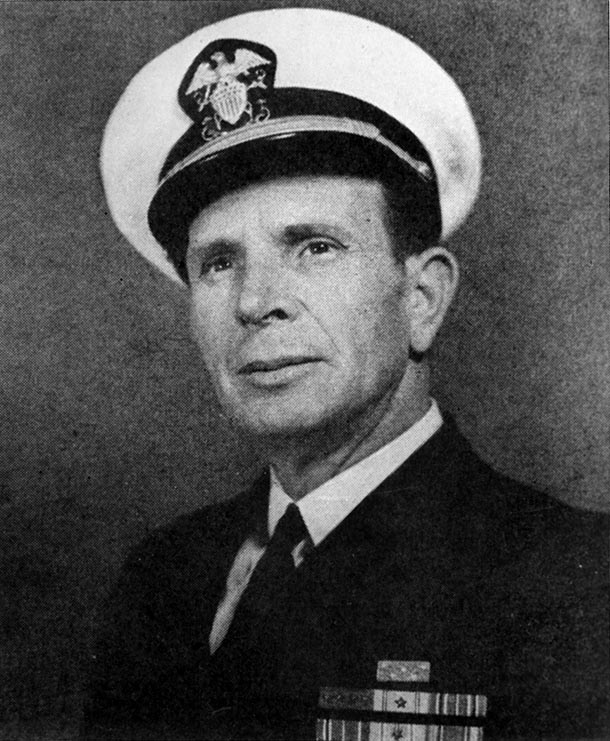
- Gary in 1945
- Born: July 23, 1901; Findlay, Ohio, U.S.
- Died: April 9, 1977 (aged 75); Garden Grove, California, U.S.
- Burial place: Fort Rosecrans National Cemetery, San Diego County, California, U.S.
- Military career
- Allegiance: United States of America
- Branch: United States Navy
- Service years: 1919–1950
- Rank: Commander
- Unit: USS Franklin
- Conflicts: World War II; Attack on Kure (March 1945)
- Awards: Medal of Honor

Commander Donald Arthur Gary (July 23, 1901 – April 9, 1977) was an officer of the United States Navy during World War II. He received the Medal of Honor for his heroism during the fires on USS Franklin on March 19, 1945.

== Biography ==
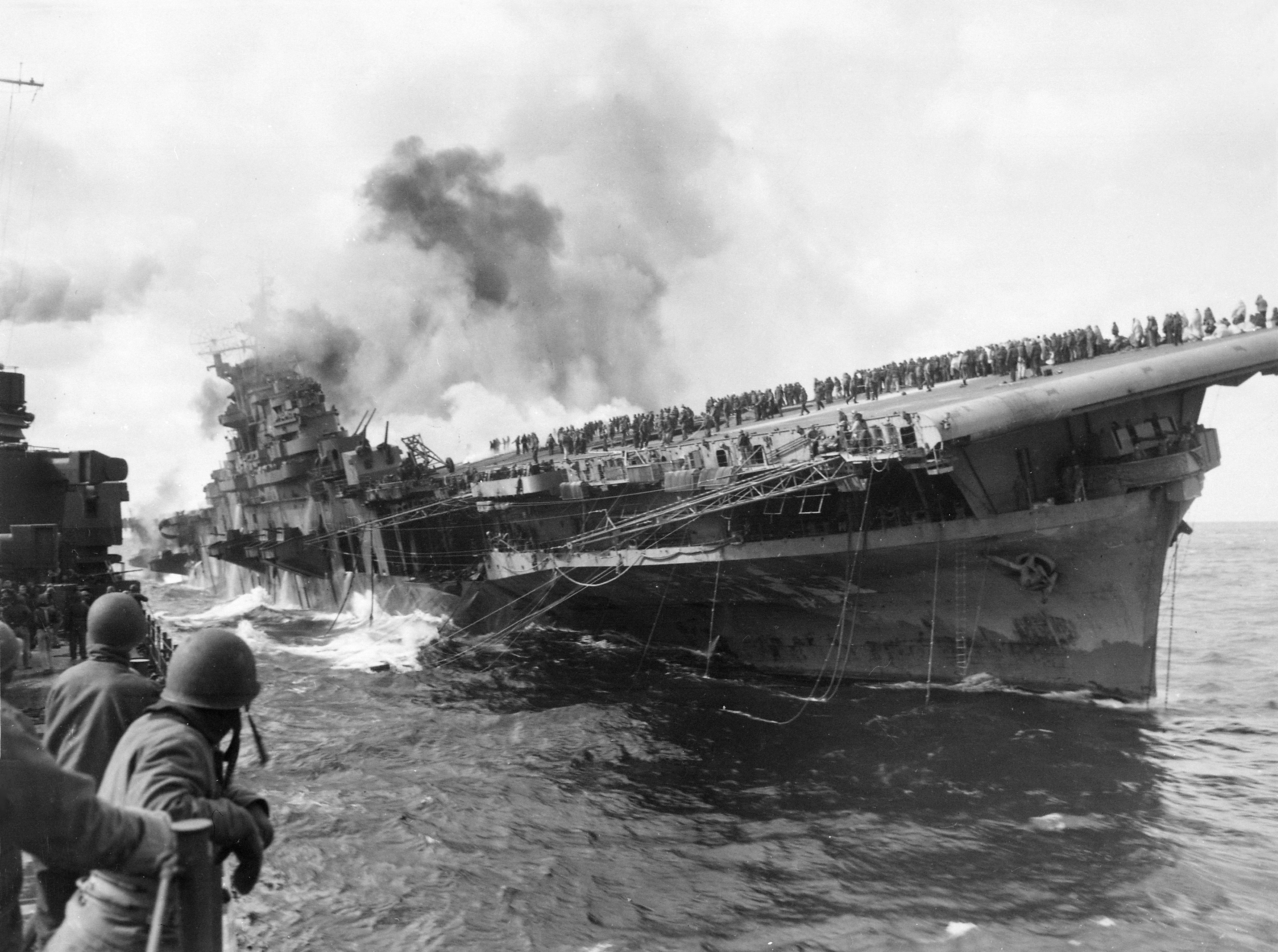
Franklin listing, with crew on deck, March 1945; seen from cruiser USS Santa Fe alongside

Gary was born in Findlay, Ohio, on July 23, 1901. He enlisted in the navy in December 1919 and served continuously in the enlisted ranks until November 1943, when he received a commission as a lieutenant, junior grade. In 1943 and 1944, Lieutenant junior grade Gary was assigned to the Third Naval District and as an inspector of machinery at the Babcock & Wilcox Company. In December 1944, he was sent to the aircraft carrier Franklin as an engineering officer.

When that ship was severely damaged by Japanese air attack on March 19, 1945 during a major operation against the Japanese Imperial Navy base at Kure, Lieutenant Gary discovered 300 men trapped in a blackened mess compartment and, finding an exit, returned repeatedly to lead groups to safety. Gary later organized and led firefighting parties to battle the inferno on the hangar deck and entered number three fireroom to raise steam in one boiler, braving extreme hazards in so doing. For his heroism on that occasion, he was awarded the Medal of Honor on January 23, 1946.

Subsequently, promoted to the ranks of lieutenant and lieutenant commander, Gary remained with Franklin until she was decommissioned in February 1947. He was then assigned to the Naval Disciplinary Barracks at Terminal Island, California, where he served until relieved of active duty pending retirement, which took place in June 1950. On the basis of his combat awards, he was advanced to the rank of commander upon retirement. Commander Donald A. Gary died in 1977.

== Namesake ==
In 1983, the guided missile frigate USS Gary (FFG-51) was named in honor of Donald A. Gary.

== Medal of Honor citation ==
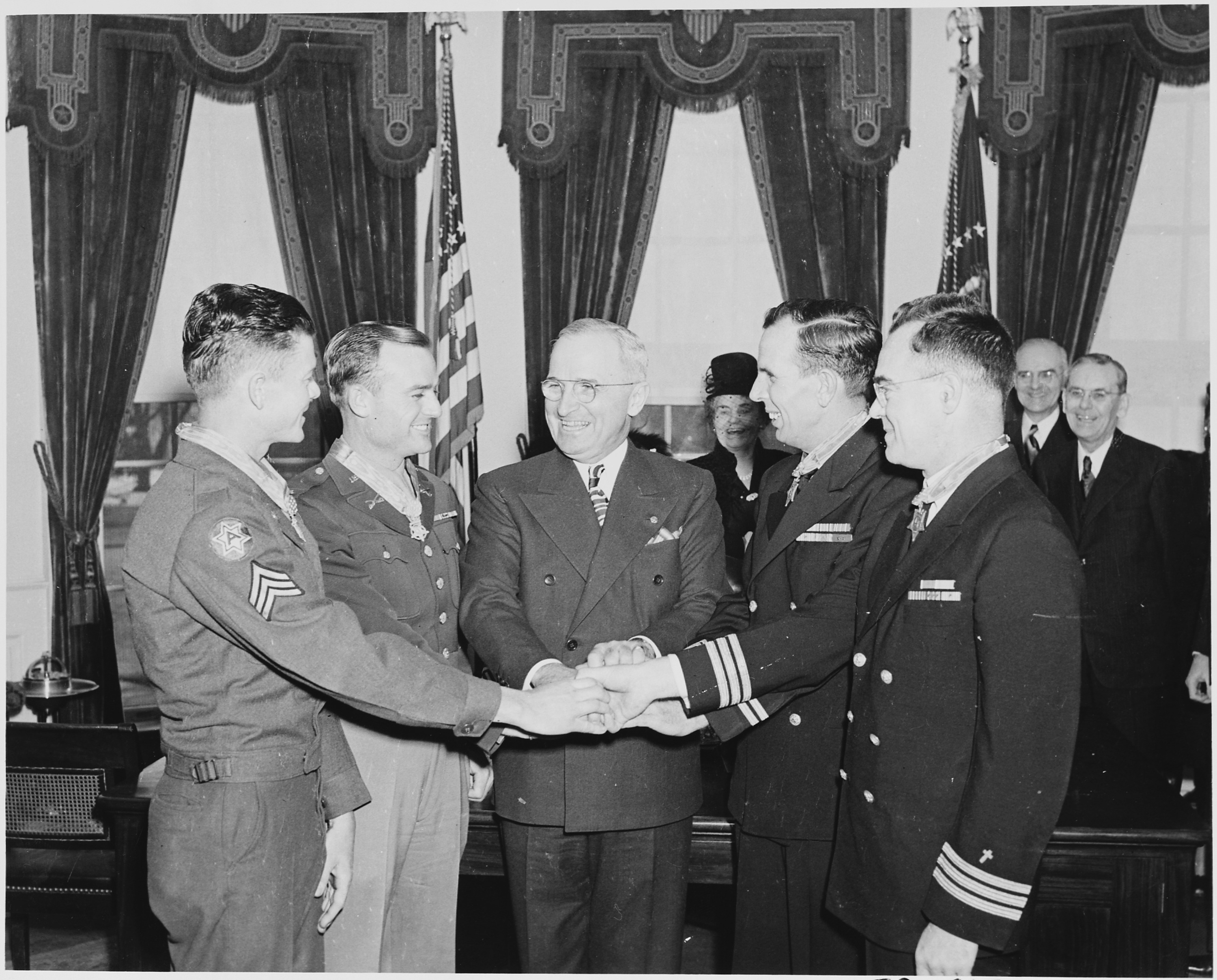
Gary (second from right) with President Harry S. Truman (center) and other Medal of Honor recipients at their medal presentation ceremony in 1946.

For conspicuous gallantry and intrepidity at the risk of his life above and beyond the call of duty as an Engineering Officer attached to the U.S.S. Franklin when that vessel was fiercely attacked by enemy aircraft during the operations against the Japanese Home Islands near Kobe, Japan, March 19, 1945. Stationed on the third deck when the ship was rocked by a series of violent explosions set off in her own ready bombs, rockets and ammunition by the hostile attack, Lieutenant Gary unhesitatingly risked his life to assist several hundred men trapped in a messing compartment filled with smoke, and with no apparent egress. As the imperiled men below decks became increasingly panic-stricken under the raging fury of incessant explosions, he confidently assured them he would find a means of effecting their release and, groping through the dark, debris-filled corridors, ultimately discovered an escapeway. Staunchly determined, he struggled back to the messing compartment three times despite menacing flames, flooding water and the ominous threat of sudden additional explosions, on each occasion calmly leading his men through the blanketing pall of smoke until the last one had been saved. Selfless in his concern for his ship and his fellows, he constantly rallied others about him, repeatedly organized and led fire-fighting parties into the blazing inferno on the flight deck and, when firerooms 1 and 2 were found to be inoperable, entered the No. 3 fireroom and directed the raising of steam in one boiler in the face of extreme difficulty and hazard. An inspiring and courageous leader, Lieutenant Gary rendered self-sacrificing service under the most perilous conditions and, by his heroic initiative, fortitude and valor, was responsible for the saving of several hundred lives. His conduct throughout reflects the highest credit upon himself and upon the United States Naval Service.

== Awards and decorations ==

| 1st row | Medal of Honor | Combat Action Ribbon | Navy Good Conduct Medal with four service stars |
| 2nd row | American Defense Service Medal with Fleet Clasp | American Campaign Medal | Asiatic-Pacific Campaign Medal with one campaign star |
| 3rd row | European–African–Middle Eastern Campaign Medal | World War II Victory Medal | National Defense Service Medal |

== See also ==
- List of Medal of Honor recipients
- List of Medal of Honor recipients for World War II
