= USS Franklin (CV-13) =

Essex-class aircraft carrier of the US Navy

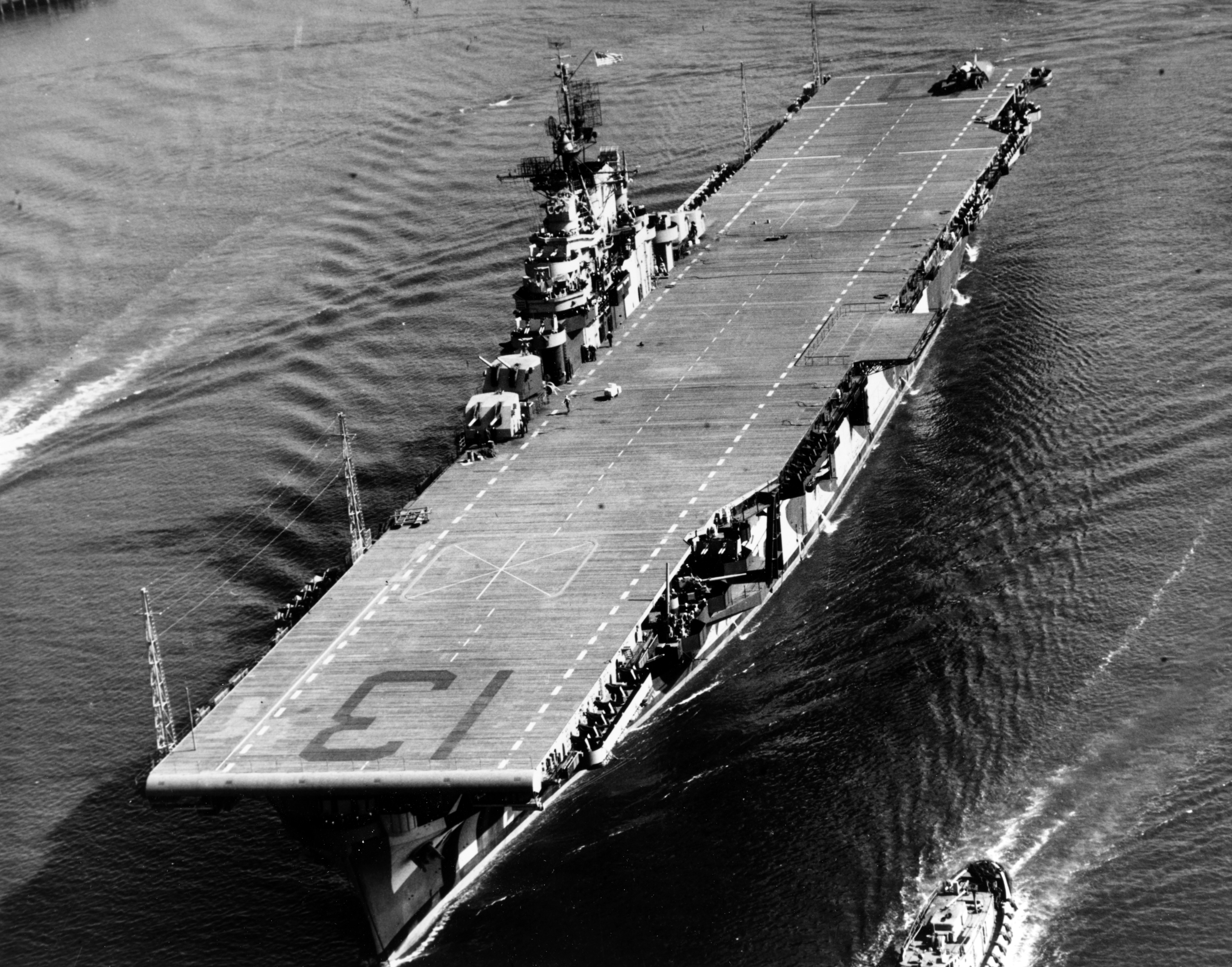
- USS Franklin underway in 1944

History

United States
- Name: Franklin
- Namesake: USS Franklin (1775), named for Benjamin Franklin
- Builder: Newport News Shipbuilding
- Laid down: 7 December 1942
- Launched: 14 October 1943
- Commissioned: 31 January 1944
- Decommissioned: 17 February 1947
- Reclassified: CVA-13, 13 October 1952; CVS-13, 13 August 1953; AVT-8, 8 May 1959
- Stricken: 1 October 1964
- Fate: Scrapped, 27 July 1966

General characteristics
- Class & type: Essex-class aircraft carrier
- Displacement: 27,100 long tons (27,500 t) (standard); 36,380 long tons (36,960 t) (full load)
- Length: 820 feet (249.9 m) (wl); 872 feet (265.8 m) (o/a)
- Beam: 93 ft (28.3 m)
- Draft: 34 ft 2 in (10.41 m)
- Installed power: 8 × Babcock & Wilcox boilers; 150,000 shp (110,000 kW)
- Propulsion: 4 × geared steam turbines; 4 × screw propellers
- Speed: 33 knots (61 km/h; 38 mph)
- Range: 14,100 nmi (26,100 km; 16,200 mi) at 20 knots (37 km/h; 23 mph)
- Complement: 2,600 officers and enlisted men
- Armament: 12 × 5 in (127 mm) DP guns; 32 × 40 mm (1.6 in) AA guns; 46 × 20 mm (0.8 in) AA guns
- Armor: Waterline belt: 2.5–4 in (64–102 mm); Deck: 1.5 in (38 mm); Hangar deck: 2.5 in (64 mm); Bulkheads: 4 in (102 mm)
- Aircraft carried: 36 × Grumman F4F Wildcat; 36 × Douglas SBD Dauntless; 18 × Grumman TBF Avenger

USS Franklin (CV/CVA/CVS-13, AVT-8), nicknamed "Big Ben," was one of 24 Essex-class aircraft carriers built during World War II for the United States Navy, and the fifth US Navy ship to bear the name. Commissioned in January 1944, she served in several campaigns in the Pacific War, earning four battle stars. In March 1945, while launching strikes against the Japanese mainland, she was badly damaged when a single Japanese dive bomber struck her with two bombs. The attack resulted in the loss of 807 of her crew and Franklin became the most heavily-damaged United States aircraft carrier to survive the war. The complement of Franklin suffered 924 killed in action during the war, the worst for any surviving U.S. warship and second only to that of USS Arizona.

After the attack, she returned to the U.S. mainland for repairs, missing the rest of the war; she was decommissioned in 1947. In reserve, she was reclassified as an attack carrier (CVA), then an antisubmarine carrier (CVS), and finally an aircraft transport (AVT), but she was never modernized and never saw active service again. Franklin and Bunker Hill (damaged by two kamikazes) were the only Essex-class carriers not to see active service as aircraft carriers after World War II. Franklin was sold for scrap in 1966.

== Construction and commissioning ==
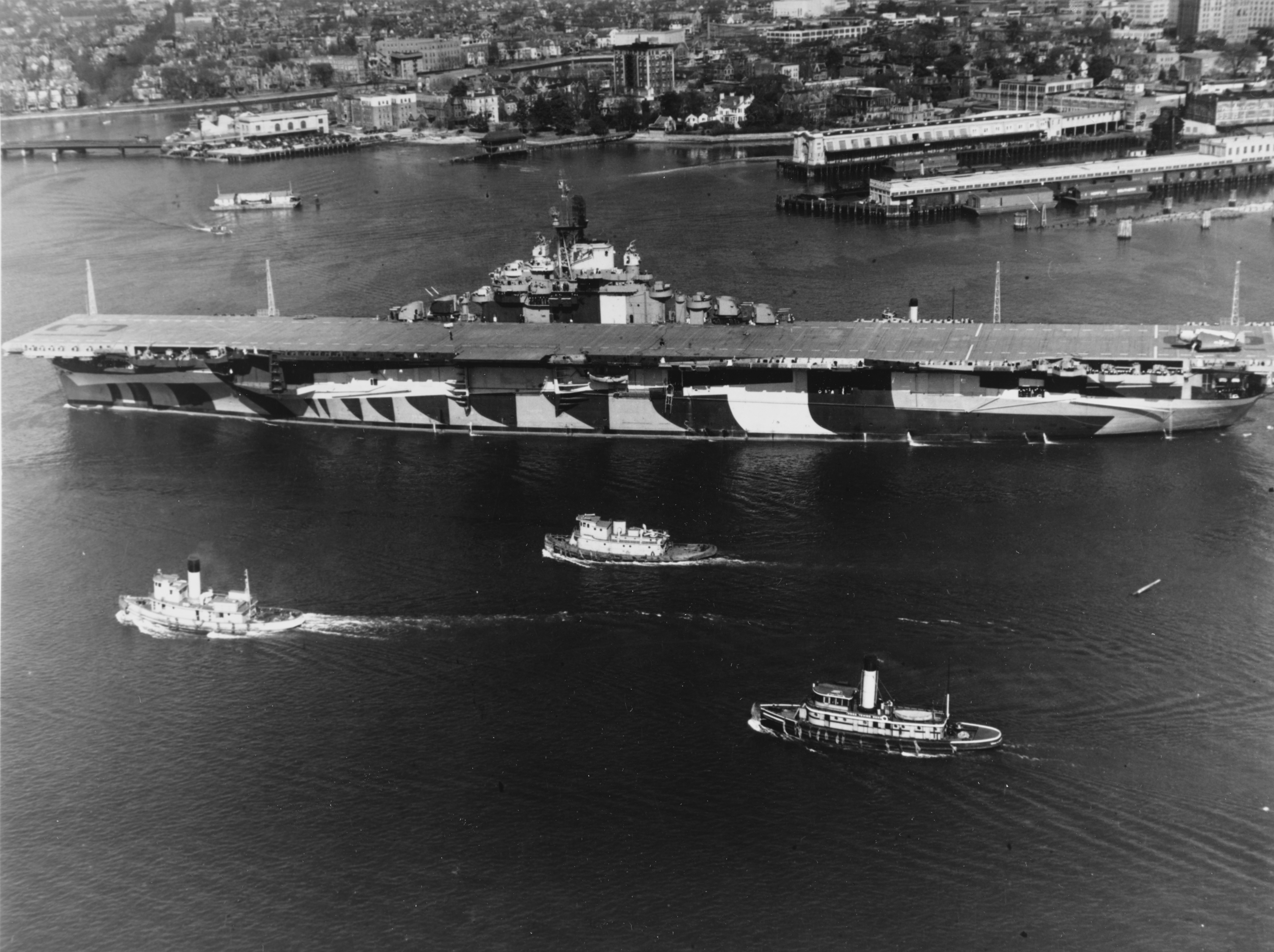
The newly commissioned Franklin departing Norfolk in February 1944

The keel of Franklin was laid down on 7 December 1942 in Shipway 11, the first anniversary of the attack on Pearl Harbor, and she was launched by the Newport News Shipbuilding Company, in Virginia, on 14 October 1943, sponsored by Lieutenant Commander Mildred H. McAfee, an American naval officer who was the Director of the WAVES. The warship was named in honor of the founding father Benjamin Franklin and for the previous warships that had been named for him; it was not named for the Battle of Franklin, Tennessee, that was fought during the American Civil War, as is sometimes erroneously reported, although a footnote in The Franklin Comes Home does attribute the naming to the Battle of Franklin. (Franklin, Tennessee was also named after Benjamin Franklin.) Franklin was commissioned on 31 January 1944. Among the plankowners was a ship's band made up of several enlisted men who were professional musicians at the time, including Saxie Dowell and Deane Kincaide, assigned to Franklin by a lottery.

== Service history ==
=== World War II ===
Carrier Air Group 13 had been established in November 1943 and embarked aboard Franklin for war service. Franklin steamed south to Trinidad for a shakedown and soon thereafter, she departed in Task Group 27.7 (TG 27.7) for San Diego, to engage in intensive training exercises preliminary to combat duty. In June, she steamed via Pearl Harbor for Eniwetok Island where she joined TG 58.2. Franklin served as the flagship of Rear Admiral Ralph E. Davison for most of her time in the western Pacific.

==== The Mariana and Palau Islands campaign ====
On the last day of June 1944, she sortied for carrier strikes on the Bonin Islands in support of the subsequent Mariana Islands assault. Her planes destroyed aircraft on the ground and in the air, gun installations, airfield and enemy shipping. On 4 July, strikes were launched against Iwo Jima, Chichi Jima, and Haha Jima, hitting ground targets, sinking a large cargo vessel in the harbor and setting three smaller ships on fire.

On 6 July, Franklin began strikes on Guam and Rota Island to soften them up for the invasion forces that were going to land on Guam, and those strikes continued until 21 July, when she lent direct support to enable safe landing of the first assault waves. Two days of replenishment at Saipan permitted her to steam in Task Force 58 for photographic reconnaissance and air strikes against the islands of the Palau Islands group. On 25 and 26 July, her planes struck enemy planes, ships, and ground installations. Franklin departed on 28 July and headed for Saipan, and the following day she was shifted to TG 58.1. Although high seas prevented taking on a needed load of bombs and rockets, Franklin steamed for another raid against the Bonins. On 4 August, her fighters attacked Chichi Jima and her dive bombers and torpedo planes attacked a ship convoy north of Ototo Jima. Targets included radio stations, a seaplane base, airstrips, and ships.

A period of upkeep and recreation from 9–28 August ensued at Eniwetok before she departed with Enterprise, Belleau Wood and San Jacinto for neutralization and diversionary attacks against the Bonins. From 31 August to 2 September, strikes from Franklin inflicted ground damage, sank two cargo ships, destroyed enemy planes in flight, and undertook photographic surveys. On 4 September 1944, Franklin took on supplies at Saipan, and then she steamed in TG 38.1 for an attack against Yap Island (3–6 September) which included direct air coverage of the Peleliu invasion on the 15th. The Task Group took on supplies at Manus Island from 21 to 25 September. Franklin, now the flagship of TG 38.4, returned to the Palau area where she launched daily patrols and night fighters.

==== Leyte ====
Early on 14 September 1944, a fighter sweep was made against Aparri, Luzon, following which she steamed to the east of Luzon to neutralize installations prior to invasion landings on Leyte. On 15 September, Franklin was attacked by three enemy planes, one of which scored with a bomb that hit the after outboard corner of the deck edge elevator, killing three men and wounding 22.

As part of Task Force 38.4, Franklin next sailed northwest to participate in the Formosa Air Battle from 12 to 16 October, where the U.S. Navy needed to destroy multiple Japanese air bases that controlled airspace from the Philippines to Okinawa to the southern Home Islands. No invasion of Luzon could take place until this Japanese air power was neutralized. On 13 October a Japanese Betty bomber aircraft was shot down, and attempted to kamikaze into Franklin. It did some damage to the flight deck, but slid off the starboard side of the ship. Following this action, Franklin moved into support for the invasion of the Philippines. The carrier's aircraft hit Manila Bay on 19 October when her planes sank and damaged ships and boats, destroyed a floating drydock, and claimed 11 Japanese aircraft.

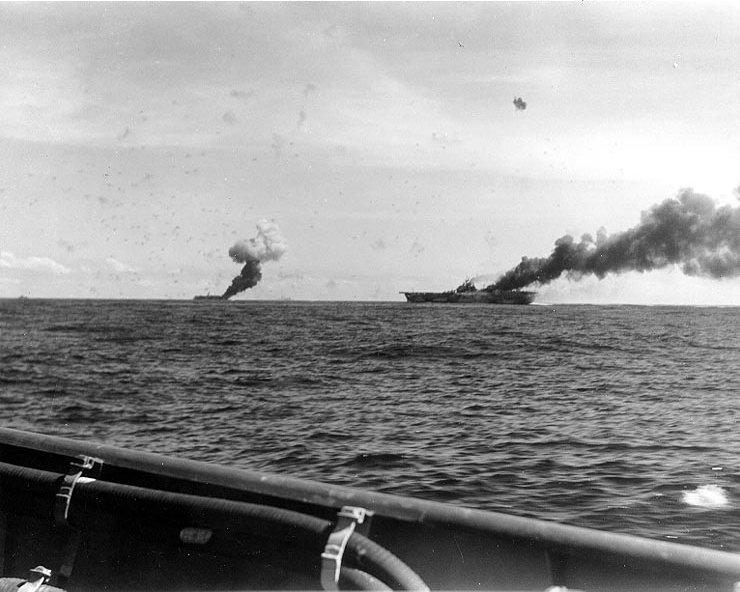
Belleau Wood (left) and Franklin hit by kamikazes, 30 October 1944

During the initial landings on Leyte (20 October) Franklin's aircraft attacked surrounding airstrips and launched search patrols in anticipation of the approach of a reported enemy attack force. On the morning of 24 October, in the Battle of the Sibuyan Sea, her planes formed part of the waves that attacked the Japanese First Raiding Force (under Vice Admiral Takeo Kurita), helping to sink Musashi south of Luzon, damage Fusō and Yamashiro, and sink Wakaba. As further enemy threats seemed to materialize in another quarter, Franklin – with TGs 38.4, 38.3, and 38.2 – sped to intercept the advancing Japanese carrier force and attack at dawn. The distant carrier force was actually a sacrificial feint, as by that time the Japanese were almost out of serviceable airplanes and, even more importantly, very short on trained pilots, but the admiral in charge, William Halsey, took the bait and steamed after them without effectively communicating his intentions, leading to the infamous "the world wonders" communications debacle. Franklin's strike groups combined with those from the other carriers on 25 October in the Battle off Cape Engaño to damage Chiyoda (she would be sunk by American cruiser gunfire subsequently) and sink Zuihō.

Retiring in her task group to refuel, she returned to the Leyte action on 27 October, her planes concentrating on a heavy cruiser and two destroyers south of Mindoro. She was under way about 100 miles (160 km) off Samar on 30 October, when enemy bombers appeared bent on a suicide mission. Navy fighters shot down most of the Japanese planes, but six broke through the combat air patrol into Franklin's task group of four carriers defensively surrounded by a circle of about twenty escorting cruisers and destroyers. Shipboard anti-aircraft guns shot down three of the four kamikazes independently diving toward each of the four carriers; but the one targeting Franklin hit the flight deck and crashed through to the gallery deck, killing 56 men and wounding 60. As the remaining two kamikazes attacked, one was shot down by anti-aircraft guns and the second missed Franklin with two bombs before flying into the stern of Belleau Wood.

Franklin was able to extinguish fires and patch the flight deck so planes could be recovered 76 minutes after the kamikaze hit. Both carriers retired to Ulithi Atoll for temporary repairs, and then Franklin proceeded to the Puget Sound Navy Yard, arriving on 28 November 1944 for repairs of her battle damage. In the meantime, on 7 November, Captain Leslie E. Gehres took over as the carrier's commanding officer. Captain Gehres was a strict disciplinarian whose autocracy was disliked by many of Franklin's crew.

Franklin departed from Bremerton on 2 February 1945 for training exercises and pilot qualification operations. After a stop for provisions, she departed from Pearl Harbor on 3 March 1945 to join TG 58.2 for strikes on the Japanese homeland in support of the Okinawa landings. On board were RADM Davison in command of the task group, RADM Gerald F. Bogan en route to take command of Carrier Division 4 and CAPT Arnold J. Isbell en route to take command of USS Yorktown. On 15 March, she rendezvoused with TF 58 units, and three days later launched sweeps and strikes against Kagoshima and Izumi on southern Kyūshū.

==== 19 March 1945 ====
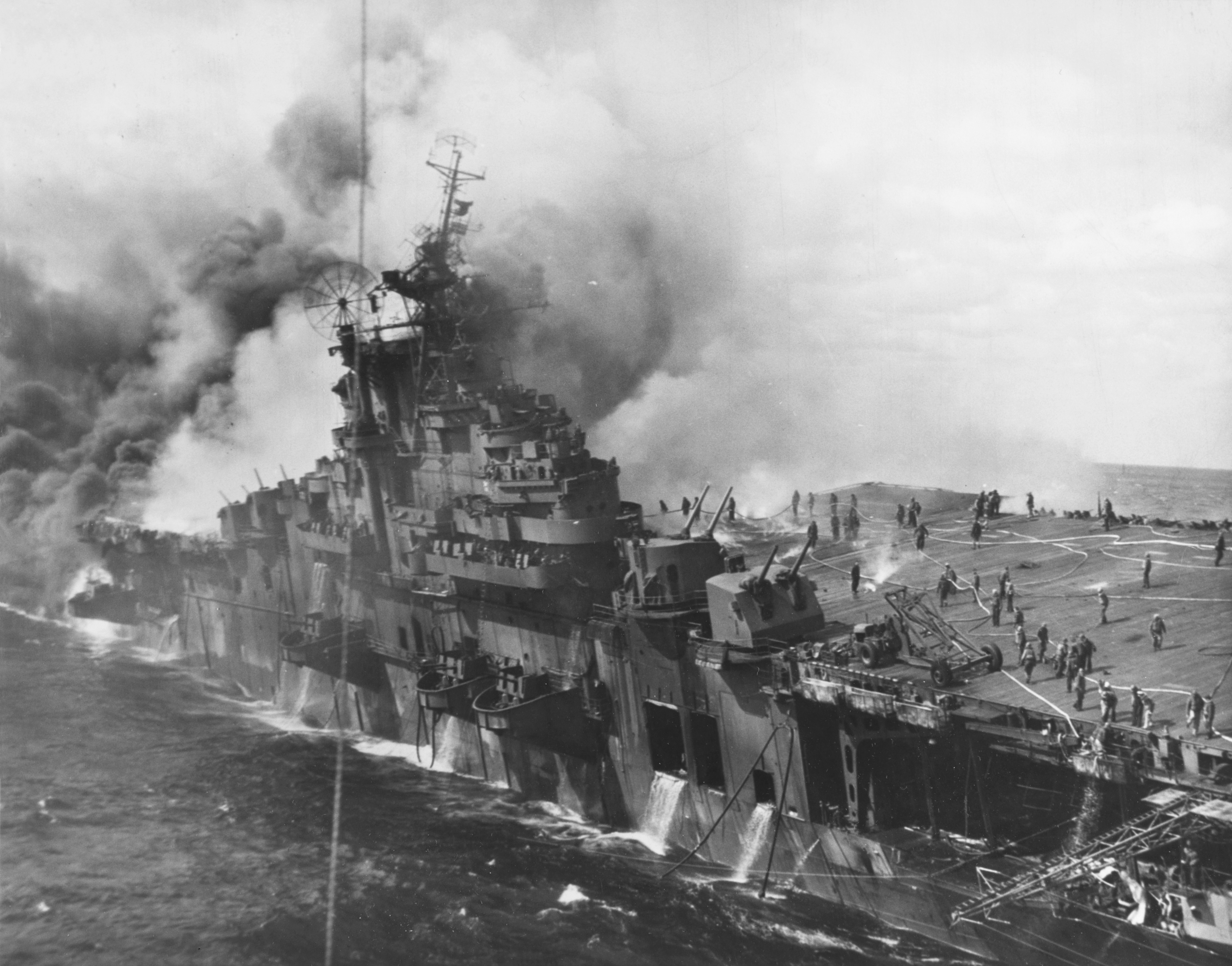
USS Franklin on fire after being struck by two bombs on 19 March 1945

Before dawn on 19 March 1945, Franklin, which had maneuvered to within 50 miles (80 km) of the Japanese mainland, closer than any other U.S. carrier during the war, launched a fighter sweep against Honshū and later a strike against shipping in Kure Harbor. The Franklin crew had been called to battle stations twelve times within six hours that night and Gehres downgraded the alert status to Condition III, allowing his men freedom to eat or sleep, although gunnery crews remained at their stations. A single Yokosuka D4Y "Judy" dive bomber approached Franklin without being detected by radar. As Franklin was about halfway through launching a second wave of strike aircraft, the Japanese dive bomber pierced the cloud cover and dropped two semi-armor-piercing bombs before the ship's anti-aircraft gunners could fire. The damage analysis came to the conclusion that the bombs were 550 pounds (250 kg). According to the war film The Saga of the Franklin, the leader of Air Group 5 shot the bomber down.

(ADVANCED FOR RELEASE AT 9.00PM(EASTERN WAR TIME), THURSDAY, MAY 17) (NY22-May 15)--CREWMEN AWAIT RESCUE FROM BURNING CARRIER-Crewmen(circle) of the Essex class carrier USS Franklin await rescue as the listing ship burns close to the Jap coast, March 19, 1945

(ADVANCE FOR RELEASE AT 9.00pm (eastern war time), THURSDAY, MAY 17) (NY21-MAY 15)--USS FRANKLIN EXPLODES AFTER JAP STRIKE--The Essex class carrier USS Franklin explodes while burning within 60 miles of the Japanese coast, where she was hit by a Jap dive bomber March 19, during a U.S. Attack on the Jap fleet in the Inland Sea.

One bomb struck the flight deck centerline, penetrating to the hangar deck, causing destruction and igniting fires through the second and third decks, and knocking out the combat information center and air plot. The second hit aft, tearing through two decks. At the time she was struck, Franklin had 31 armed and fueled aircraft warming up on her flight deck, and these planes caught fire almost immediately. The 13 to 16 tons of high explosives aboard these planes soon began detonating progressively, and although "Tiny Tim" air-to-surface rockets were loaded aboard Vought F4U Corsairs, their three-point, nose up attitude allowed most of the rockets to fly overboard when their motors ignited. The hangar deck contained planes, of which 16 were fueled and 5 were armed. The forward gasoline system had been secured, but the aft system was operating. The explosion on the hangar deck ignited the fuel tanks on the aircraft, and a gasoline vapor explosion devastated the deck. The twelve "Tiny Tim" rockets aboard these planes ricocheted around the hangar deck until their 138 lb (63 kg) warheads detonated. Of the personnel who were in the hangar only two survived. One "Tiny Tim" warhead lodged on the third deck below the forward elevator, and was not removed until Franklin reached Ulithi.

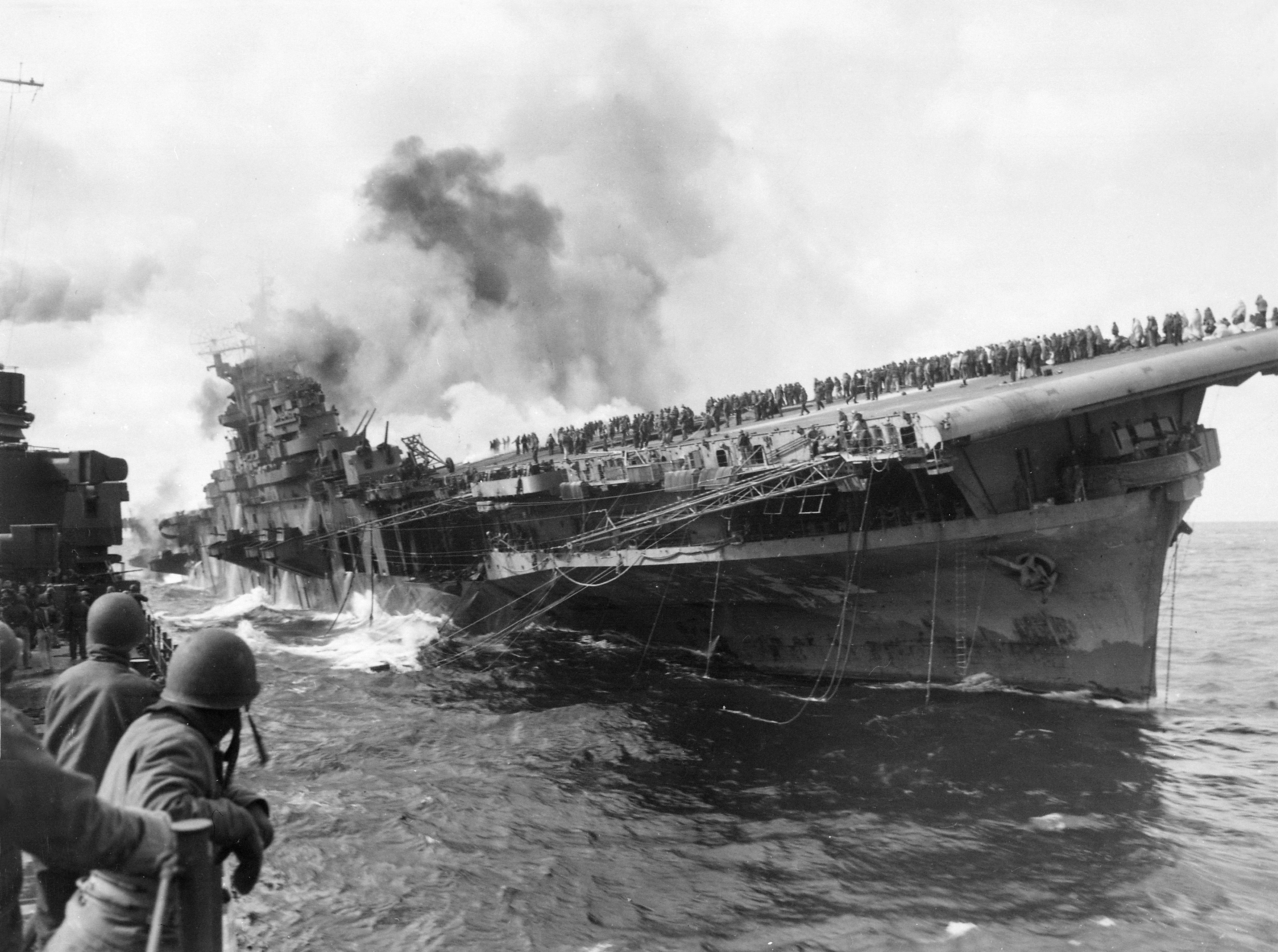
Franklin listing, with crew on deck, 19 March 1945

Dense smoke soon filled the engineering spaces, which were ordered evacuated with the throttles set. Franklin was soon dead in the water, without radio communications, and broiling in the heat from enveloping fires. On the bridge, Captain Gehres ordered Franklin's magazines flooded but this could not be carried out as the ship's water mains were destroyed by the explosions or fire. Cruisers USS Pittsburgh and USS Santa Fe with destroyers USS Miller, USS Hickox, USS Hunt and USS Marshall left the task group formation to assist Franklin. Accompanied by Rear Admiral Bogan, Rear Admiral Davison transferred his flag to the destroyer Miller by breeches buoy and suggested abandoning ship, but Gehres refused to scuttle the Franklin as there were still many men alive below deck.

The other destroyers fell in astern of the carrier to rescue members of the crew who had been blown overboard, or jumped off to avoid the fire. Some of the destroyers put their bows against the side of the burning carrier to take off men trapped by the fire. Some of the crew from the assisting ships were killed or wounded, but the hundreds of officers and enlisted men who voluntarily remained saved many lives, and then saved the ship. Among the dead was one of the ship's surgeons, Lieutenant Commander George W. Fox, M.D., who was killed while tending to wounded sailors; he was awarded the Navy Cross posthumously. When totaling casualty figures for both Franklin cruises numbers increase to 926 killed in action, the worst for any surviving U.S. warship and second only to that of battleship USS Arizona. Certainly, the casualty figures would have far exceeded this number, but for the work of many survivors. Among these were the Medal of Honor recipients Lieutenant Commander Joseph T. O'Callahan, the warship's Catholic chaplain, who administered the last rites, organized and directed firefighting and rescue parties, and led men below to wet down magazines that threatened to explode; and also Lieutenant Junior Grade Donald A. Gary, who discovered 300 men trapped in a blackened mess compartment and, finding an exit, returned repeatedly to lead groups to safety. Gary later organized and led fire-fighting parties to battle fires on the hangar deck and entered the No. 3 fireroom to raise steam in one boiler. Santa Fe rescued crewmen from the sea and approached Franklin to take off the numerous wounded and nonessential personnel. Among those evacuated were the surviving members of the embarked Air Group 5, who were deemed nonexpendable. 32 Corsair fighters, 15 Grumman TBM Avenger torpedo bombers, 7 Curtiss SB2C Helldiver dive bombers, and 5 Grumman F6F Hellcat fighters, 59 planes total, were destroyed by the Japanese attack.

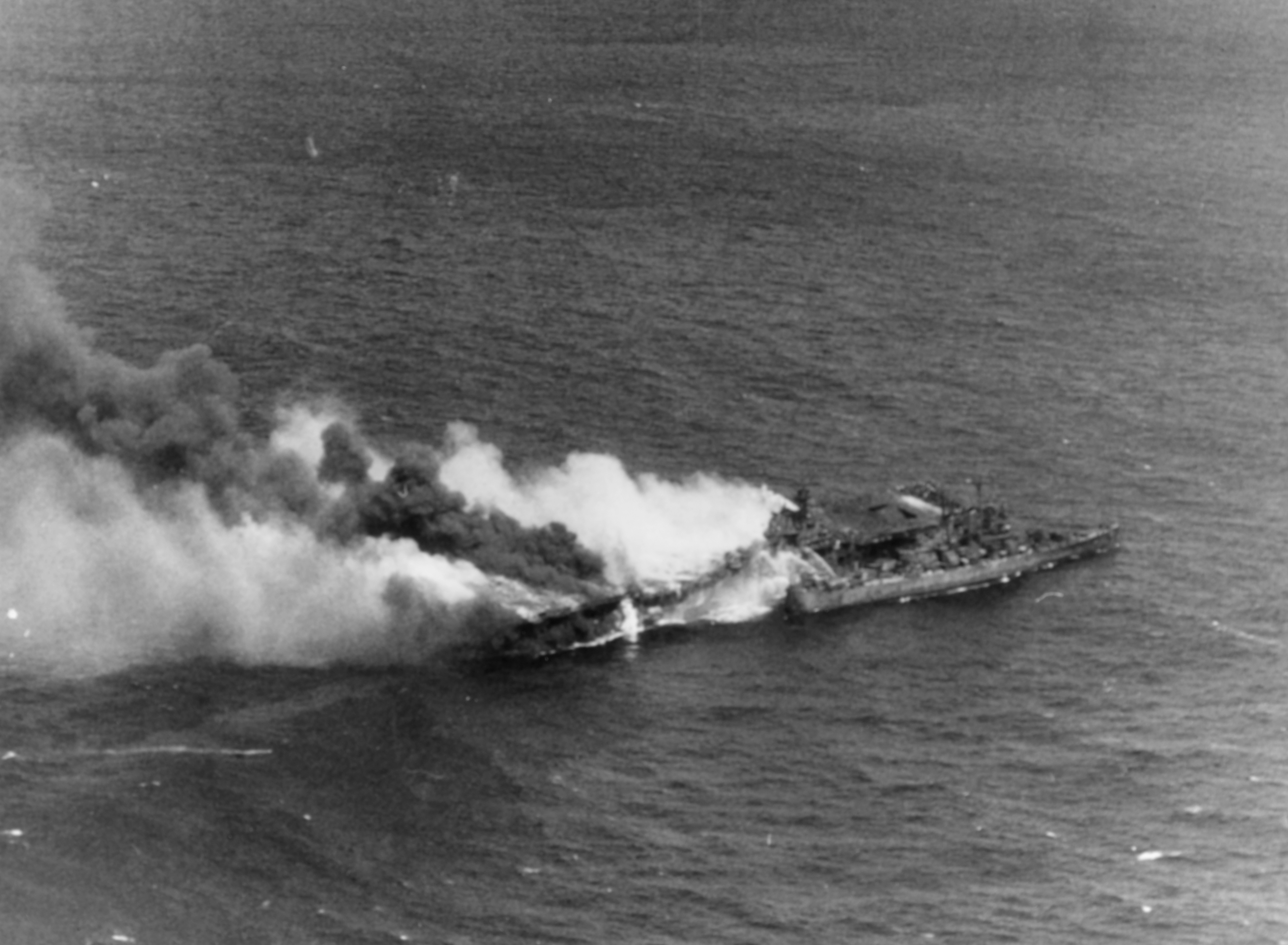
The burning Franklin with USS Santa Fe (CL-60) alongside

The casualty count for Franklin varies from source to source as some do not include air group personnel or Marines, passengers who were in transit, a journalist, or those who died from their wounds much later. In History of United States Naval Operations in World War II, Samuel Eliot Morison gives figures of 724 killed and 265 wounded for 19 March 1945. Joseph A. Springer, citing "official statistics," gives higher numbers of 807 killed and at least 487 wounded. Franklin suffered the most severe damage and highest casualties experienced by any U.S. fleet carrier that survived World War II. In addition to the Medals of Honor for Donald Gary and Joseph O'Callahan and the posthumous Navy Cross for George Fox, 21 additional Navy Crosses and 26 Silver Stars were awarded as a result of actions that day. Among these were a gold star in lieu of a third Navy Cross for Commander (later Rear Admiral) Joseph F. "Joe" Taylor, the ship's executive officer and a former torpedo bomber pilot, and Navy Crosses for Captain (later Rear Admiral) Harold C. Fitz, the Santa Fe commander, Commander Stephen Jurika, the Franklin navigator and also a former torpedo bomber pilot, Lieutenant Commander (later Rear Admiral) Dwight L. Johnson, the Miller commander, Lieutenant Commander Macgregor "Mac" Kilpatrick, an experienced fighter pilot and the commanding officer of Fighting Squadron Five, and Lieutenant Fred R. "Red" Harris, a Franklin flight deck officer and a member of the Texas Legislature both before and after the war. Among those who received Silver Stars were Lieutenant Grimes W. Gatlin, the ship's other chaplain and a Methodist minister, and Donald H. Russell, a civilian Corsair technical support engineer.

Franklin, like many other wartime ships, had been modified with additional armament, requiring larger crews and substantial ammunition stocks. Aircraft were both more numerous and heavier than originally planned for, and thus the flight deck had been strengthened. The aircraft carrier, therefore, displaced more than originally planned, her freeboard was reduced, and her stability characteristics had been altered. Santa Fe came alongside Franklin to spray water from fire hoses over the fire as she received stretcher cases and ambulatory wounded from the carrier. The enormous quantities of water poured aboard her to fight the fires further reduced freeboard, which was exacerbated by a 15-degree list to starboard, and her stability was seriously impaired such that her survival was in jeopardy. Pumping ballast to correct the starboard list caused a 15-degree list to port. Pittsburgh towed Franklin at 5 kn (9.3 km/h; 5.8 mph) for the remaining daylight hours. After six hours, with the fire finally under control such that the ship could be saved, men returned to the engineering spaces and got underway at 25 kn (46 km/h; 29 mph) with only two of the four screws driving. Franklin's planes which had been in the air when the carrier was hit landed aboard the other carriers in the task group, although it was necessary to push some planes overboard to make room for them. Admiral Davison deployed five destroyers to search for any of Franklin's men who had been blown overboard or jumped into the sea.

==== Return to the U.S. ====
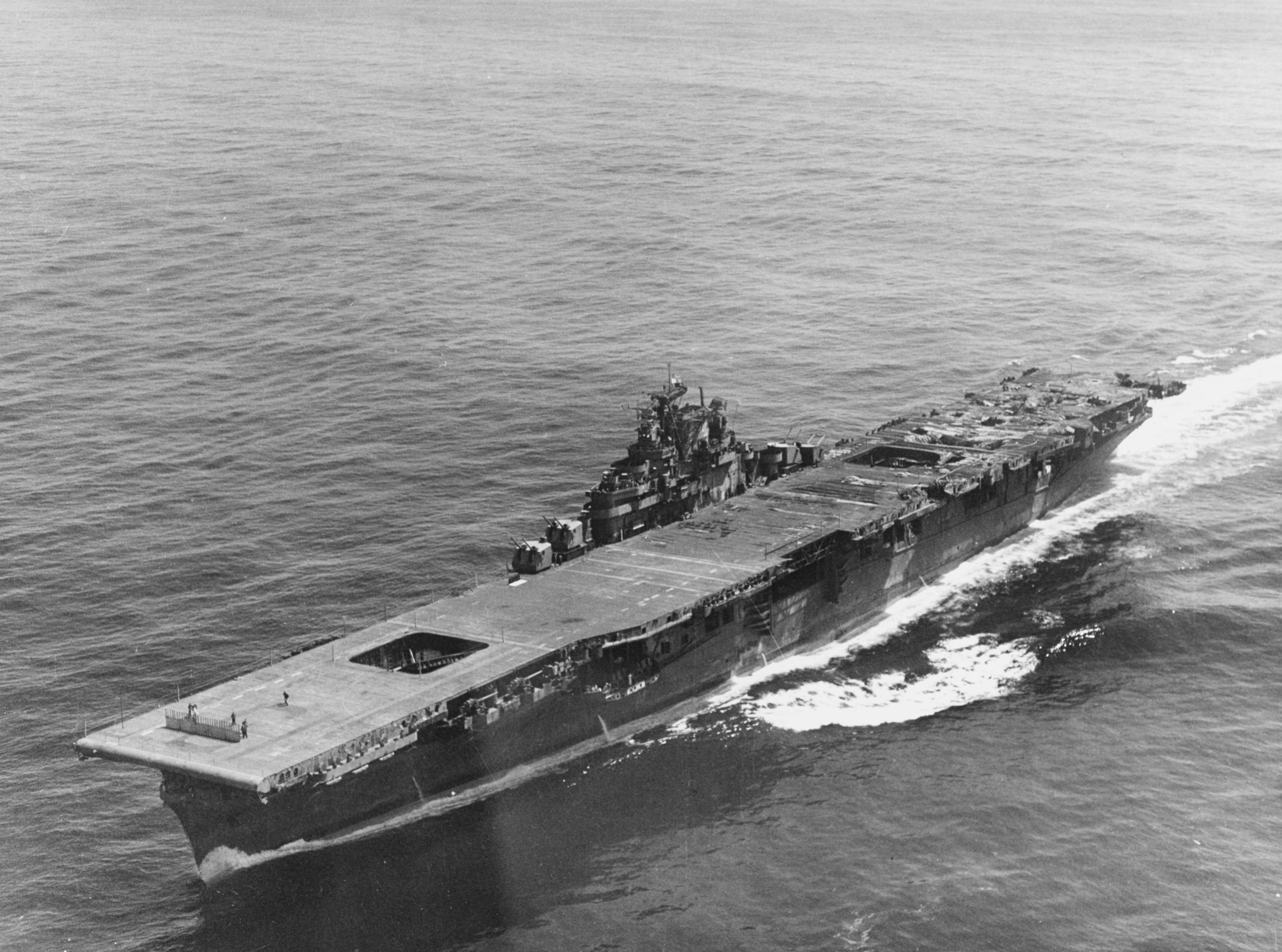
Franklin approaching New York, 26 April 1945

Franklin proceeded to Ulithi Atoll at 14 kn (26 km/h; 16 mph) under her own power for emergency repairs. Next she headed to Pearl Harbor, Hawaii, for temporary repairs. As per Pearl Harbor procedures, a civilian harbor pilot came aboard to help navigate the carrier to the dock; Captain Gehres, however, refused, and said he would "take her in" himself. He maneuvered Franklin into the dock area too fast, crashing her into the dock; embarrassed, Gehres blamed the mooring details for the incident. After temporary repairs were completed, the ship continued its journey through the Panama Canal to the Brooklyn Navy Yard, New York, where she arrived on 28 April 1945. She had to steam to the East Coast of the United States for repairs in New York because all of the repair shipyards on the West Coast were heavily overloaded with American warships that had been damaged by Japanese kamikazes.

Upon Franklin's arrival in New York, a long-brewing controversy over the ship's crew's conduct during her struggles finally came to a head. Captain Gehres had accused many of those who had left the ship on 19 March 1945 of desertion, despite the fact that those who had jumped into the water to escape had done so to prevent a likely death by fire, or had been led to believe that "abandon ship" had been ordered. While en route from Ulithi Atoll to Hawaii, Gehres had proclaimed 704 members of the crew to be members of the "Big Ben 704 Club" for having stayed with the heavily damaged warship, but investigators in New York discovered that only about 400 were actually on board Franklin continuously. The others had been brought back on board either before or during the stop at Ulithi. All of the charges against the men of her crew were quietly dropped.

Captain Gehres was relieved as captain of the Franklin in July 1945 and reassigned to command Naval Air Station San Diego, eventually reaching the rank of rear admiral before retirement.

Despite severe damage, Franklin was eventually restored to good condition. The story of this aircraft carrier's near-destruction and salvage was chronicled in the wartime documentary, The Saga of the Franklin (1945), and the 2011 documentary, USS Franklin: Honor Restored.

=== Post-war ===
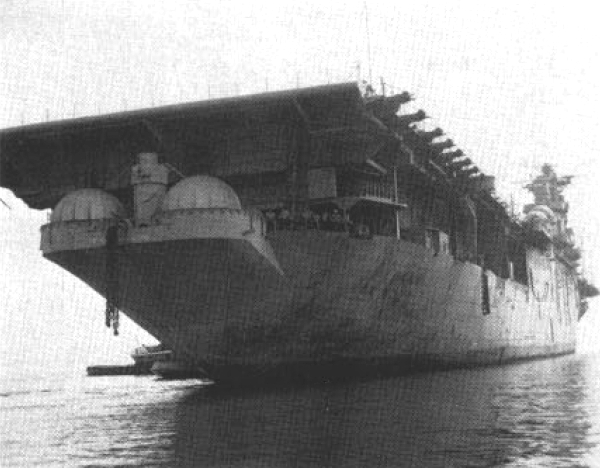
Franklin at Bayonne in 1964

Franklin received four battle stars for her World War II service. After the war, Franklin was opened to the public for Navy Day celebrations. On 17 February 1947, she was decommissioned at Bayonne, New Jersey.

While Franklin lay mothballed at Bayonne, she was redesignated as an attack aircraft carrier CVA-13 on 1 October 1952, an antisubmarine warfare support carrier CVS-13 on 8 August 1953 and, ultimately, as an aircraft transport AVT-8 on 15 May 1959. However, she never went to sea again, and was stricken from the Naval Vessel Register on 1 October 1964. She and Bunker Hill, which also had sustained severe damage from a kamikaze attack, were the only carriers in their class that never saw any active-duty postwar service, but their wartime damage had been successfully repaired. In fact, it was their like-new condition which kept them out of commission, as the Navy for many years envisioned an "ultimate reconfiguration" for them, which never took place.

The Navy initially sold Franklin to the Peck Iron and Metal Company of Portsmouth, Virginia, but reclaimed her because of an urgent Bureau of Ships requirement for her four turbo generators. She was again sold for scrap to the Portsmouth Salvage Company of Chesapeake, Virginia, on 27 July 1966. She departed naval custody under tow (by the Red Star Towing Company) on the evening of 1 August 1966.

== Awards ==
- American Campaign Medal
- Asiatic-Pacific Campaign Medal (4 battle stars)
- World War II Victory Medal
- Philippine Presidential Unit Citation
- Philippine Liberation Medal

== Gallery ==
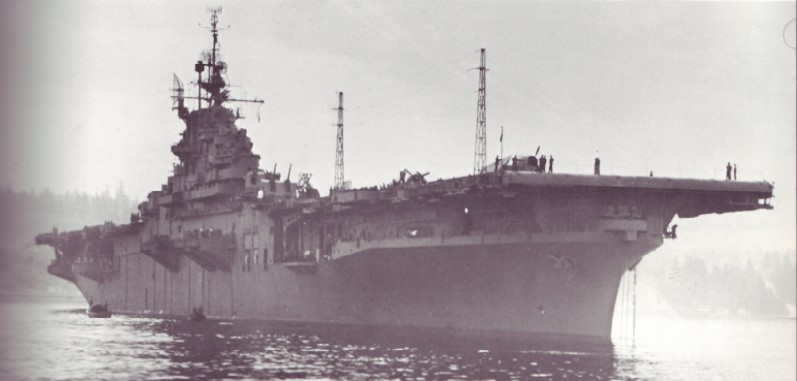
Franklin in January 1945

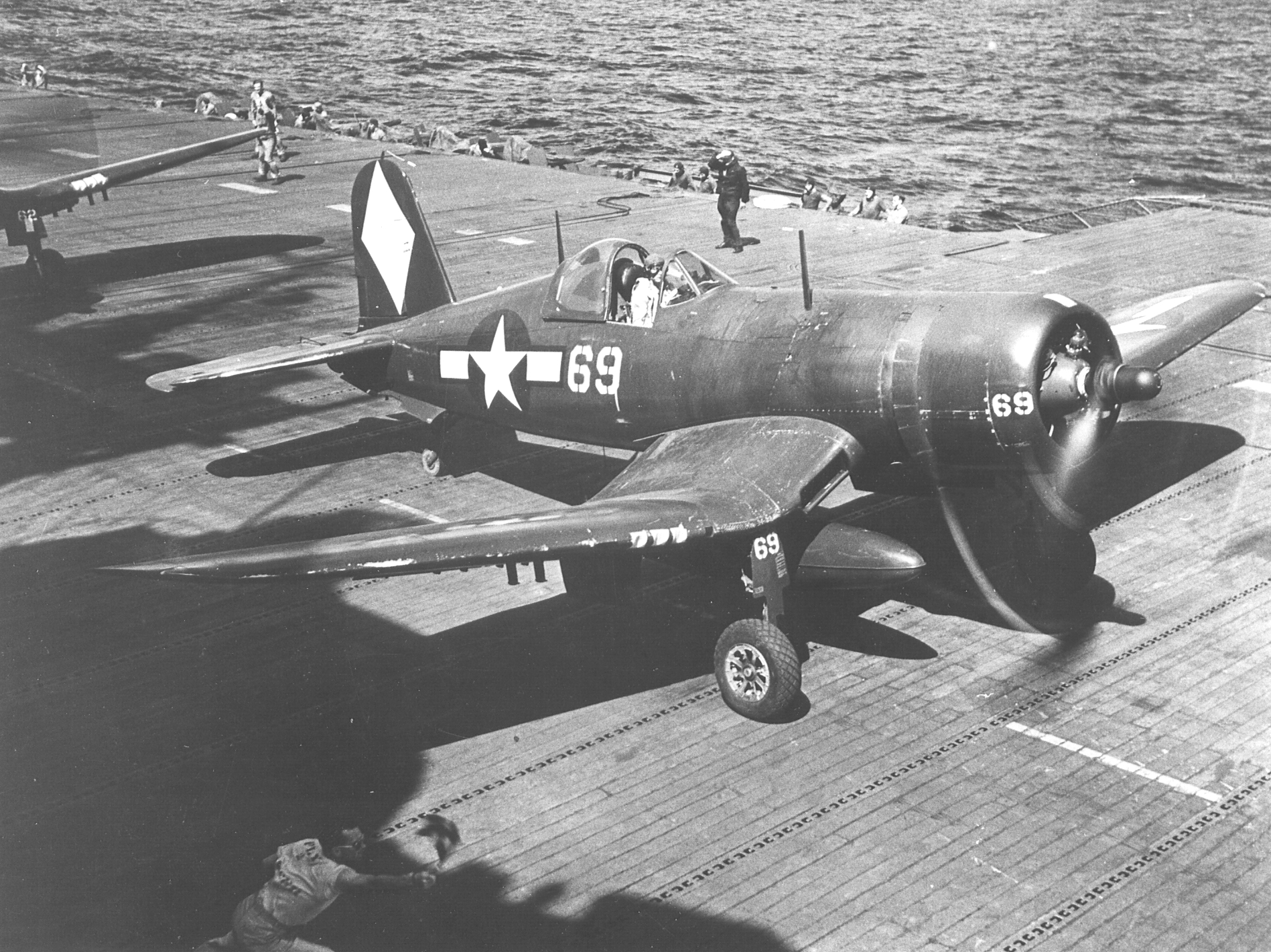
F4U-1D of VF-5 on Franklin in 1945

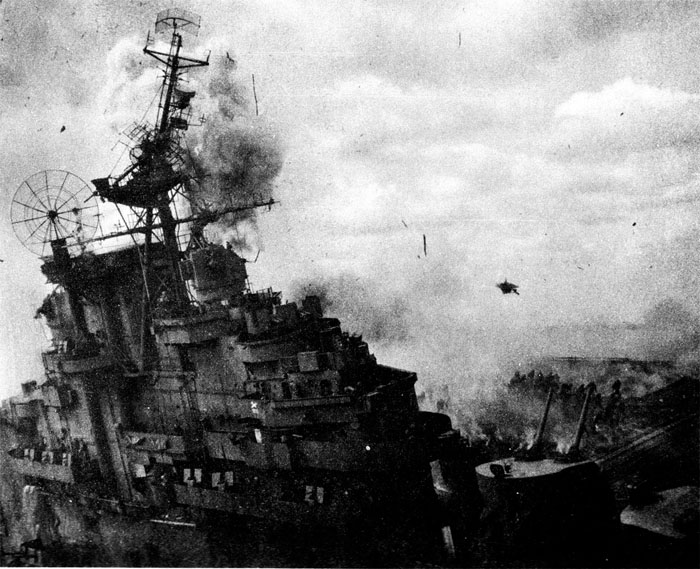
Franklin's bridge on 19 March 1945

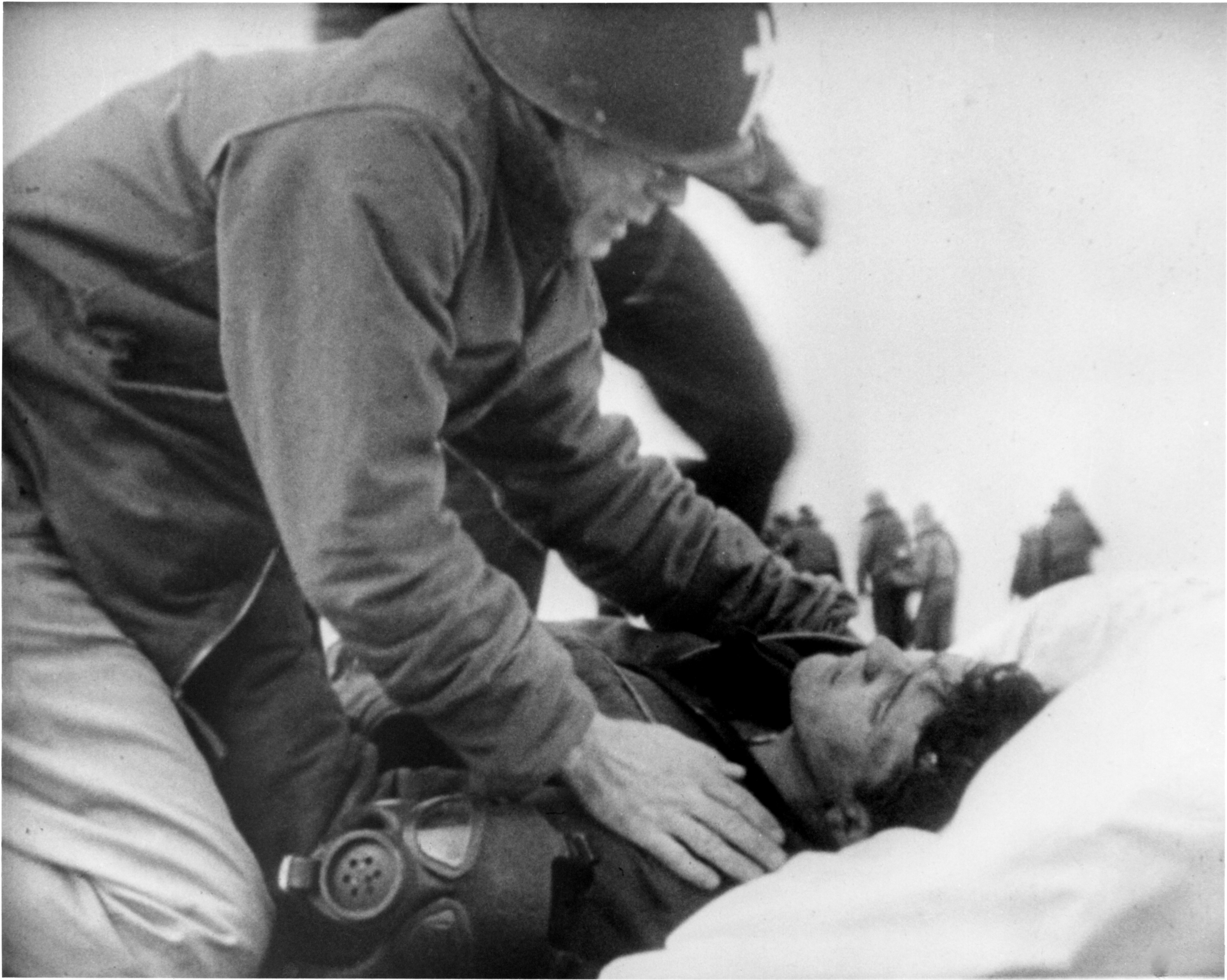
Joseph T. O'Callahan gives last rites to an injured crewman aboard Franklin on 19 March 1945

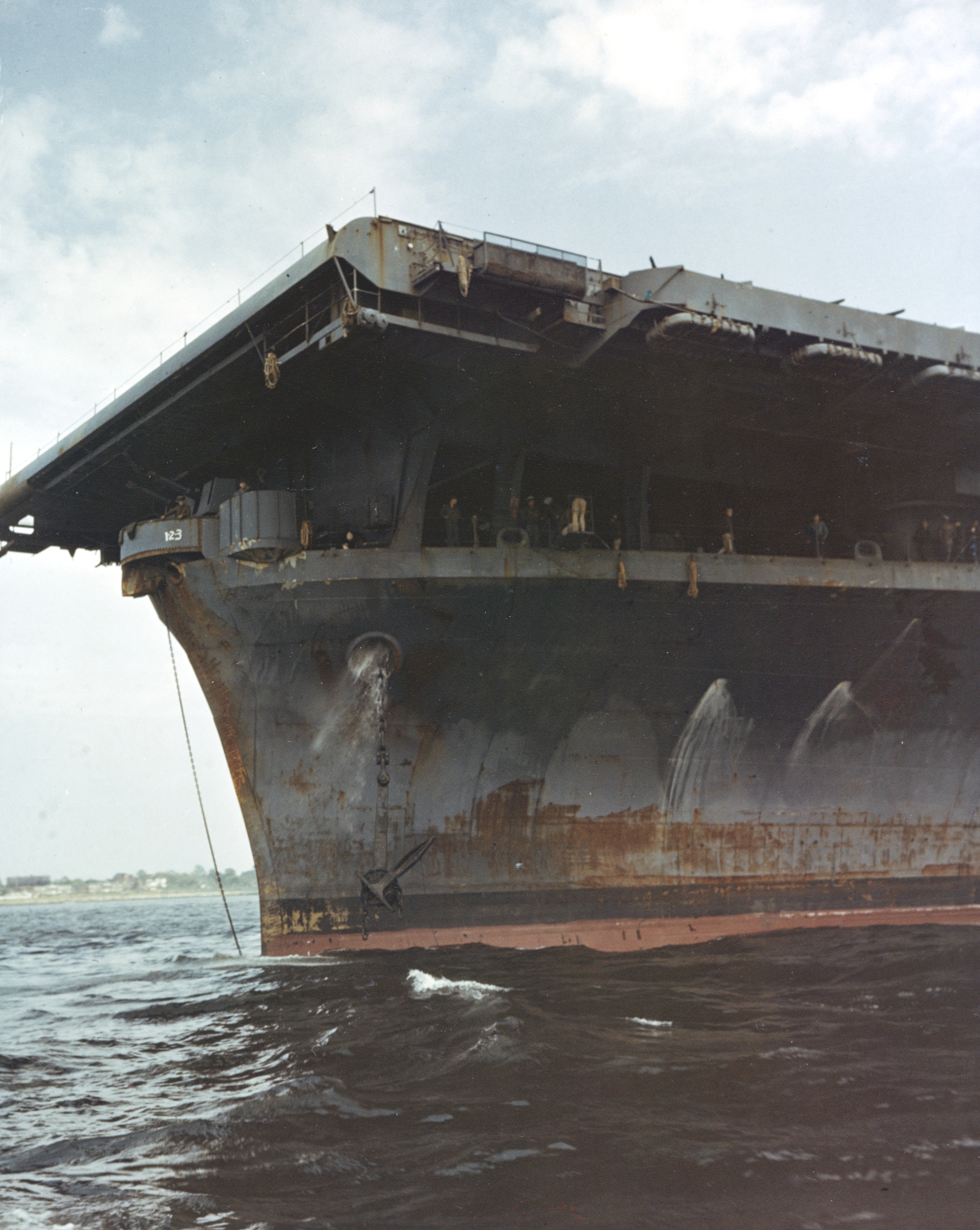
Bow of the badly damaged Franklin in April 1945

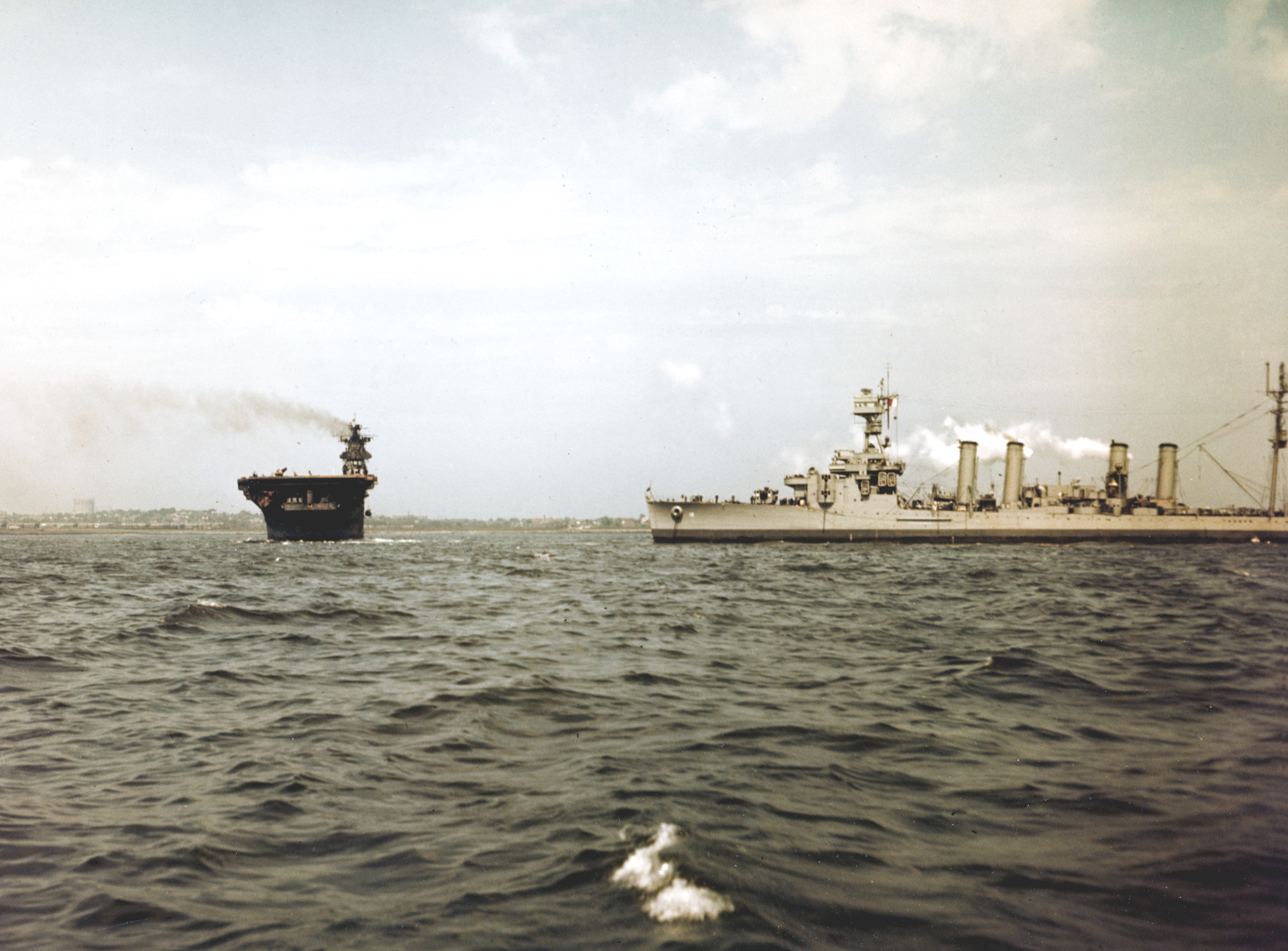
Franklin and Marblehead off New York in 1945

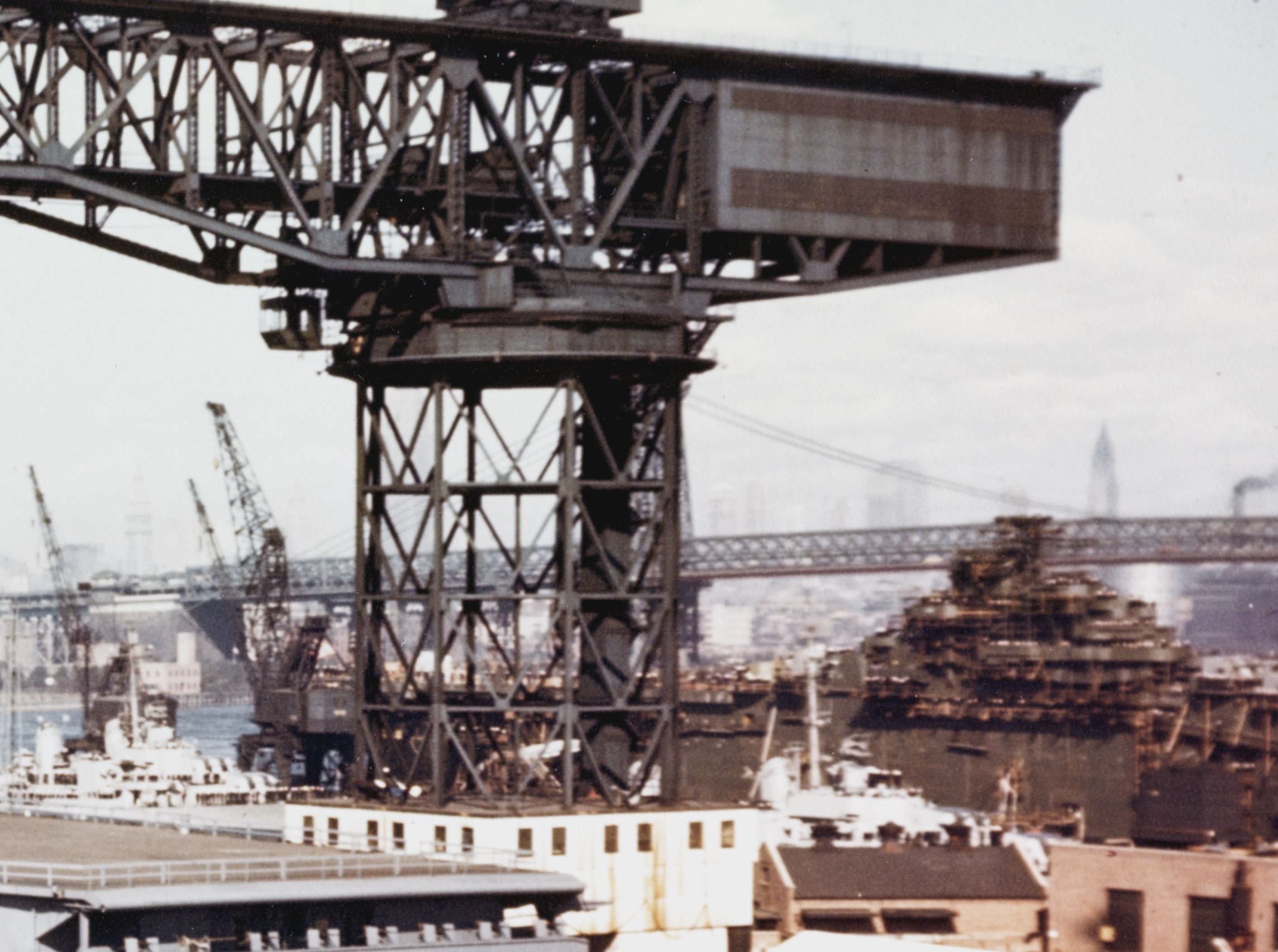
Franklin under repair at the Brooklyn Navy Yard in 1945

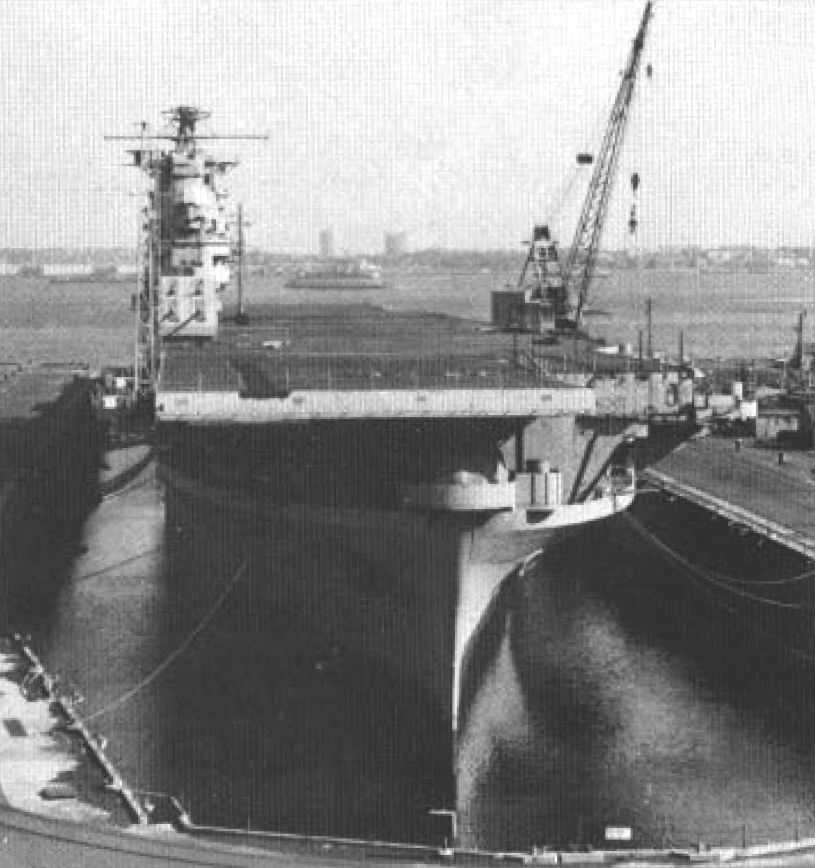
Franklin laid up in the early 1960s
