= KTLA Morning News =

American morning television news program

- Also known as: KTLA 5 Morning News; KTLA Morning Show (2006–2008)
- Presented by: Megan Henderson; Jessica Holmes; Melvin Robert; Kaj Goldberg; Eric Spillman; Frank Buckley; Chris Schauble; Henry Dicarlo; Ginger Chan; Megan Telles; Lauren Lyster
- Opening theme: "Connect" by 615 Music
- Country of origin: United States

Production
- Executive producer: Marcus Smith
- Production locations: KTLA Studios; 5800 Sunset Boulevard, Hollywood
- Camera setup: Videotape; Multi-camera
- Running time: 480 minutes
- Production company: Nexstar Media Group

Original release
- Network: KTLA
- Release: July 8, 1991 – present

Related
- KTLA Weekend Morning News (2011–present)

The KTLA 5 Morning News is an American morning television news program airing on KTLA (channel 5), a CW-owned-and-operated station in Los Angeles, California, owned by Nexstar Media Group. The program broadcasts each weekday from 4 am to 12 pm Pacific Time. The 4–7 am portion is a general news/traffic/weather format; the 7 am – 12 pm portion also features news, traffic, and weather but emphasizes entertainment and other light-hearted stories (incorporating celebrity interviews—both in-studio and occasionally via satellite—as well as features such as fashion and food segments). Weekend editions of the program also air on Saturday and Sunday from 6 to 11 a.m.

The 7–10 am portion of the program was simulcast on its San Diego sister station KSWB-TV (channel 69, also owned by Tribune and, at the time the simulcast began, was an affiliate of The WB) from March 7, 2005, to July 31, 2008 (under the name The WB Morning Show, and then The CW Morning Show upon becoming a CW affiliate); KSWB later relaunched an in-house news department on August 1, 2008, after switching its affiliation from The CW to Fox and debuted its own locally produced morning newscast on the date of the affiliation switch.

== History ==
The program began on July 8, 1991, as The KTLA Morning News, anchored by Carlos Amezcua and Barbara Beck, with weathercaster Mark Kriski and Eric Spillman and Michele Ruiz reporting from remote locations. It was created and cast by executive producer Nicholas van Hoogstraten under the direction of then-general manager Steve Bell and produced by Raymond J. Brune. Originally a two-hour program airing from 7 to 9 am, the show originally was a straight and hard news broadcast with few light features and little focus on current weather and traffic, which was reflected with low ratings and acclaim. Near the end of 1991, van Hoogstraten moved over to Tribune Broadcasting, and Joel Tator, a new executive producer, was brought in and lightened the tone of the newscast, including a 'today's papers' segment where the anchors read through the day's stories in newspapers such as the Los Angeles Times and left the papers spread on the desk through the show. The tone was soon reflected in the staff, which allowed their chemistry to gel and become lighter, including happy talk for stretches in the newscast where stories were lighter.

The critical moment for the Morning News came in February 1992, when a series of rainstorms hit the Southland, causing severe flooding in the San Fernando Valley. At that time, the only other news programs on in the morning were the national news shows on ABC (Good Morning America), NBC (Today), and CBS (CBS This Morning), all of which broadcast on a three-hour tape delay in the Pacific Time Zone and had negligible live cut-ins into the taped programs of the current situation outside the local :25/:55 local news cut-ins. Finding a lack of coverage, which they saw needed addressing, KTLA set aside its normal programming and provided extensive coverage of the flooding. That brought in large numbers of Southland viewers; once the flood crisis ended, viewers remained and ratings remained steady thereafter, allowing further experimentation with the newscast.

Another critical moment for the Morning News occurred on January 17, 1994, when the Northridge earthquake rocked the area, causing widespread damage, collapsing freeways, sparking power outages, rupturing water and gas lines, prompting the stoppage of television and film production, and altering public events and flight schedules due to precautionary closures in Hollywood and Los Angeles International Airport. The quake also caused some cosmetic (but not structural) damage to the KTLA newsroom when reporters Eric Spillman, Larry McCormick, Stan Chambers, and Michele Ruiz were producing special reports throughout the morning.

With the new relaxed atmosphere and a need to provide live, local news when the other stations could not, along with the station becoming the West Coast flagship of The WB in January 1995, the show began to thrive. The program continued to succeed even as the newscast saw new competition with the debut of Good Day L.A. on Fox-owned KTTV (channel 11) in July 1993. Around 1998, Michele Ruiz left for NBC-owned KNBC (channel 4), and Jim Newman also left for ABC-owned KABC (channel 7). On May 2, 2001, Barbara Beck resigned from KTLA with Giselle Fernandez later becoming co-anchor. In 2003, Fernandez left and was replaced by Michaela Pereira. In September 2007, Carlos Amezcua left KTLA for KTTV to replace John Beard as anchor on that station's 10 pm newscast. In May 2013, Pereira left KTLA to become an anchor for CNN's morning news program New Day.

In September 2006, KTLA changed the subtitles of each portion of the morning newscast. The 5 am hour was renamed KTLA Morning News First Edition, the 6 am hour was retitled KTLA Morning News Early Edition, and the 7-10 am portion was renamed the KTLA Morning Show. The newscasts underwent another retitling on February 4, 2008, to bring the entire program back under the KTLA Morning News brand, with the hour of the particular portion of the program included in the title for the 5, 6, and 9 am hours. On February 2, 2012, the KTLA Morning News was expanded by an extra hour, starting at 4 am.

In April 2011, KTLA added a weekend morning extension of the newscast, airing on Saturdays initially from 6 to 7 am—later expanding to 5 to 7 am in September 2012 (airing in the early time slot due to The CW's children's program block)—and on Sundays from 6 to 9 am; On May 9, 2014, the Saturday morning newscast was expanded to three hours and moved to 6:00 to 9:00 am, in a uniform timeslot as the Sunday morning newscast, and following the death of Chris Burrous, is currently anchored by Lauren Lyster and Megan Telles with Kacey Montoya covering weather, who also work during the week in other assignments. The addition made KTLA the fourth Tribune-owned station to carry a weekend morning newscast (the others being fellow CW affiliate WGN-TV in Chicago—which twice ran weekend morning newscasts, first from 1992 to 1998 (the Saturday edition of that program having only remained by the time of its cancellation) and again since 2010—and Fox affiliates WXIN in Indianapolis and WTIC-TV in Hartford).

KTLA offers midday news from 12 pm to 2 pm (Pacific Time) as part of the extended morning local newscast, the afternoon and evening news from 3 to 7:30 pm, and primetime and late-night news from 10 to 11:35 pm (Monday through Friday).

On the morning of September 14, 2022, Sam Rubin announced on the air that Lynette Romero had left her anchor position with KTLA. On Saturday, September 17, Mark Mester apologized on air to both viewers and Romero for this, after which he was suspended by the station.

== Personalities ==
Eric Spillman is the only remaining personality currently appearing on the program who has been with the KTLA Morning News since its 1991 debut. Mark Kriski was laid off along with 4 other KTLA journalists in Feb 2026. Entertainment reporter Sam Rubin came on board approximately six months later and remained until his death on May 10, 2024.

=== Current on-air staff ===
- Chris Schauble – 4-7 am anchor
- Megan Henderson – 4-7 am anchor
- Frank Buckley – 7-11 am anchor
- Jessica Holmes – 7-11 am anchor
- Melvin Robert – 7-11 am entertainment anchor
- Eric Spillman – field reporter and fill-in anchor
- Gayle Anderson – feature field reporter
- Kaj Goldberg - 11 am-12 pm weather anchor
- Henry Dicarlo - 4 am-7 am weather anchor
- Ginger Chan - 4 am-10 am traffic anchor
- Megan Telles - 6 am-11 am anchor
- Lauren Lyster - 6 am-11 am anchor

=== Notable former staff ===
- Carlos Amezcua – original anchor (moved to KTTV and then served as co-anchor at KUSI in San Diego, California.)
- Asha Blake
- Chris Burrous (deceased)
- Cher Calvin (now 6 pm and 10 pm weeknight anchor at KTLA)
- Dayna Devon - still with the station as host of LA Unscripted.
- Yomary Cruz –now voice actor of Sheila in Red vs. Blue
- Giselle Fernández - Now an anchor with Spectrum News 1: Southern California.
- Roger Lodge – "The Sports Lodge" sports talk contributor (2010–2012)
- Mark Mester – now with KMIR-TV
- Michaela Pereira – now with KTTV
- Christina Pascucci - now with KTTV
- Lynette Romero – former 6 am-11 am weekend anchor and weekday reporter, now with KNBC's Today in L.A. morning newscast.
- Sam Rubin – entertainment reporter (deceased)
- Michele Ruiz – now President and CEO of Ruiz Strategies, and formerly founder and CEO of Saber Hacer, a bilingual "how-to" site
- Sharon Tay – Anchored for KCBS-TV/KCAL-TV, currently an agent with Douglas Elliman California
- Jennifer York – Multiple Emmy award-winning aerial traffic reporter

== See also ==
- WGN Morning News - similar morning news and entertainment program on sister station WGN-TV in Chicago, Illinois.
