= KDSL =

KDSL may refer to:

- KDSL-CA, a defunct low-power television station (channel 19) formerly licensed to Ukiah, California, United States, a translator for KMAX-TV
- Former name of Knet, network-management software for KDE and Linux
