= Carter Evans =

American journalist

- Born: Honolulu, Hawaii
- Education: B.A. Ithaca College
- Occupation: Television reporter
- Spouses: Courtney Friel (m. 2005; div. 2016); Lauren Lyster (m. 2018)

Carter Evans is an American journalist who is CBS News' Los Angeles–based correspondent.

== Biography ==
Carter Evans was born in Honolulu, Hawaii, in 1975. He graduated with a B.A. in Broadcast Journalism and a minor in Philosophy from Ithaca College. In 1995, he worked as a freelance reporter for the CBS affiliate KGMB in Honolulu, Hawaii. In 2003, he moved to Los Angeles to work for spent KCBS-TV/KCAL-TV. He then moved to New York City as an anchor for WNYW/WWOR-TV and as a freelance correspondent for CBS Newspath where he worked for CBS MoneyWatch. He then worked as a reporter for CNN Newsource where he served as a rotating host of CNN's financial Q&A program The Help Desk and covered the 2010 BP oil spill, the 2011 Japanese earthquake and tsunami, 2011's Hurricane Irene, the 10th anniversary of the September 11 attacks, and reported the 2008 financial crisis direct from the New York Stock Exchange Trading Floor. In February 2013, he was named CBS News Los Angeles–based correspondent where he received recognition for his coverage of the 2013 shooting by Christopher Dorner.

== Personal life ==
He is divorced from KTLA weekend anchor Courtney Friel, with whom he has two children. He married KTLA reporter Lauren Lyster in August 2018.
