= Michele Ruiz =

American journalist

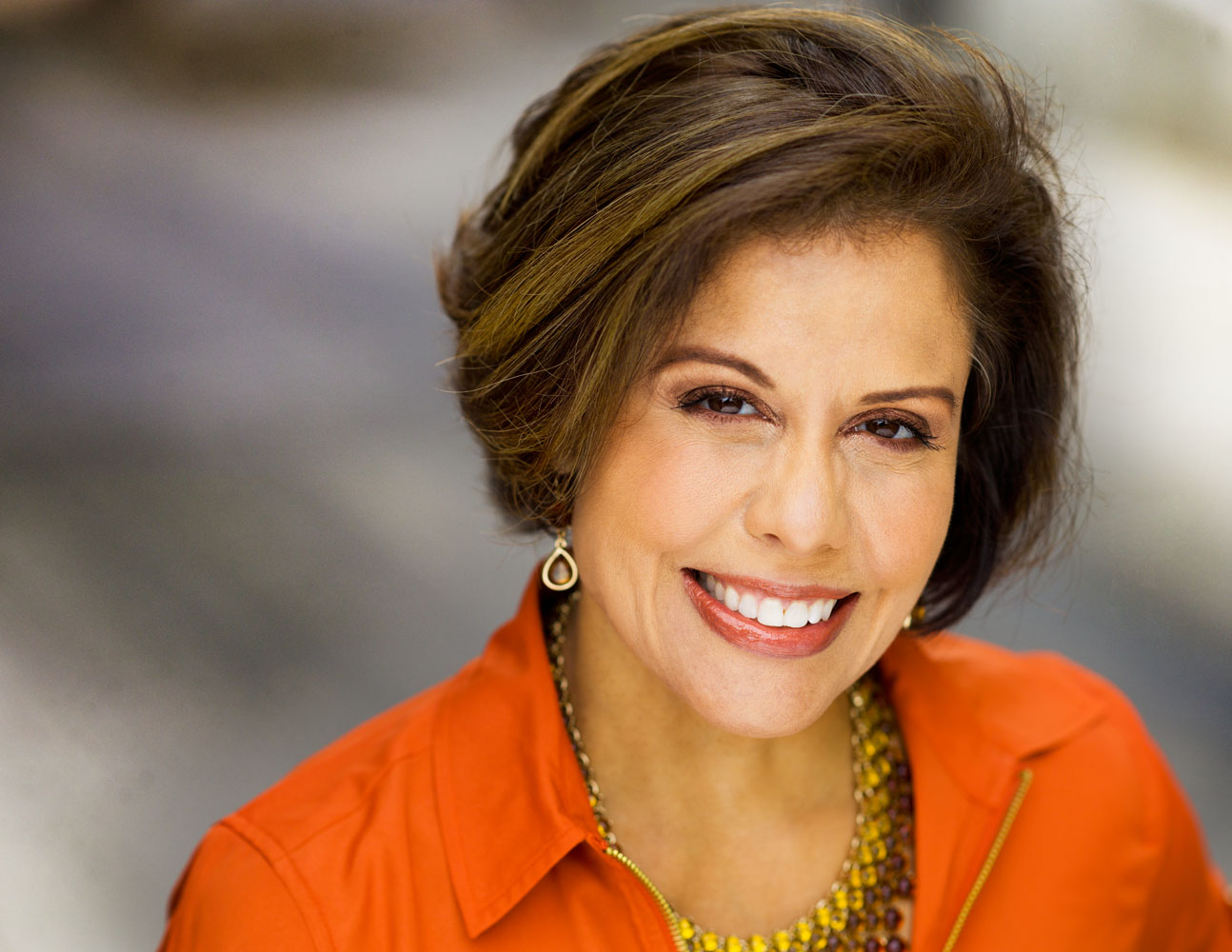
- Born: January 21, 1965 (age 61); Glendale, California, U.S.
- Education: Cal State Fullerton
- Occupations: News anchor, entrepreneur, author, public speaker
- Employer(s): CON 1989 - 1991; KTLA 1991 - 1998; KNBC 1998 - 2005
- Known for: Former anchor for KNBC-TV; Co-founder and CEO of BiasSync; President and CEO of Ruiz Strategies
- Children: 2
- Awards: 5 Emmy Awards, 2 Golden Mikes, 1 LA Press Club Award
- Website: www.micheleruiz.com

Michele Ruiz (born January 21, 1965), is an entrepreneur, award-winning broadcast journalist, author, public speaker and former Los Angeles news anchor for KNBC-TV. She is co-founder and CEO of BiasSync, a SaaS technology company that helps organizations identify and eliminate biases in the workplace. She is also President and CEO of Ruiz Strategies, a communications firm that develops and executes content marketing strategies for businesses, government entities and executives. She is also the founder and former President/CEO of SaberHacer.com, a bilingual educational broadband website for US Hispanics. She maintains a self-titled blog on the site MicheleRuiz.com.

== Early life ==
Ruiz was born in Glendale, California on January 21, 1965. Her parents were Panamanian, and Ruiz described a difficult childhood growing up in Southern California dealing with racism, discrimination and poverty, an upbringing that she credits for making her "scrappy" and determined. Her first language was Spanish, and she didn't learn English until she went to school. She attended Cal State Fullerton while working full-time in a clerical position, and graduated in 1988 with a Bachelor of Arts degree in Communications.

== Broadcasting career ==
Ruiz began her broadcasting career in 1989, co-anchoring Channel One News. The program initially began as a pilot program broadcast in four high schools, before its national debut in 1990.

From 1991 to 1998, Ruiz worked at KTLA in Los Angeles, California as a field reporter and morning anchor for the station's KTLA Morning News. She also co-hosted a weekly public affairs program, called Making It! Minority Success Stories.

In 1998, she joined KNBC-TV as a general assignment reporter. In 2001, she was promoted to an anchor position, where she co-anchored the station's nightly 6:00 pm newscast with Chuck Henry.

=== Journalism awards ===
Ruiz has received 19 Emmy Award nominations, and is a five-time honoree, as well as a four-time Golden Mike Award-recipient. While at KTLA, she won three Los Angeles-area Emmys and two Golden Mikes. In 2003, she won two more Emmys for her work on NBC4 news specials "Journey to Africa" and "LA Riots: Rubble to Rebirth." She has received numerous honors, including two Golden Mikes, for her work on NBC4's "Beating the Odds" series, and in 2002 was presented the LA Press Club Award for a series on autism.

In 2005, two angel investors agreed to provide seed capital to launch a business idea from Ruiz. Two months later she decided to leave KNBC to become an entrepreneur.

== Entrepreneurial career ==
=== Saber Hacer ===
In 2006, Ruiz launched Saberhacer.com, a bilingual educational broadband website for US Hispanics.

=== Michele Ruiz ~ My Life as a Latina Entrepreneur ===
Ruiz launched the website MicheleRuiz.com and started her personal brand, entitled "Michele Ruiz ~ My Life as a Latina Entrepreneur". In her self-titled blog, she publishes stories of her personal and professional life.

=== Ruiz Strategies ===
In 2011, Ruiz started Ruiz Strategies, a strategic communications and content marketing services company that uses social media, new media, traditional media and virtual technologies to help companies and individuals promote themselves.

=== BiasSync ===
In May 2019, along with Dan Gould, former VP of Technology at Tinder, and fellow entrepreneur Robin Richards, Ruiz co-founded the SaaS technology company BiasSync, focusing on anti-bias identification. The company uses data from personal assessments to help companies identify and eliminate unconscious biases in the workplace.

== Author ==
In January 2016, Ruiz published her first book, a guide to legal marketing and advertising entitled Content Marketing For Lawyers.

== Charity work ==
Ruiz has served on the Board of Directors for the non-profit agency Para Los Niños for 13 years. She has also served on the Cal State Fullerton College of Communications' Dean's Advisory Board.

== Awards and recognition ==
Ruiz was given two commendations for "Outstanding Citizenship for Civic Contributions" and "Dedication to the Community" by the City of Los Angeles. She was named "Latina of the Year" and "Comision Femenil De Los Angeles". She also received the Certificate of Congressional Commendation from the U.S. House of Representatives, a commendation letter from the United States Senate, and a Certificate of Recognition from the California State Senate.

Ruiz was honored in 2006 with Cal State Fullerton's Vision & Visionaries award. The Distinguished Alumni Award is the highest honor that the university bestows on its graduates. It has been presented to titans in business, science, education, communications and the arts, and brings to the forefront, the vision, achievements and philanthropic efforts of Cal State Fullerton's graduates.

In 2013, Ruiz was named "Inspiring Latina" and featured in Latina Magazine. Also in 2013, Ruiz was named as a Champion of Diversity, by DiversityBusiness.com.

== Film appearance ==
Ruiz had a cameo role as a television reporter in the 1993 film Rising Sun, based on Michael Crichton's novel of the same name.

== Personal ==
Ruiz lives in Los Angeles.
