= Lauren Lyster =

American journalist (born 1981)

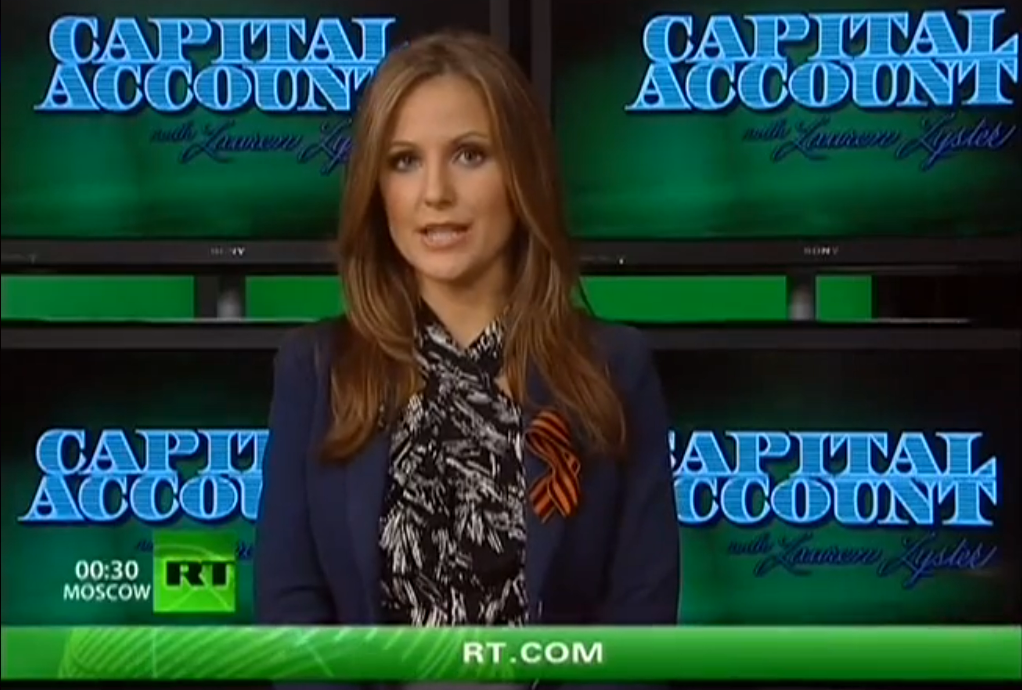
- Lyster on RT's Capital Account
- Born: October 13, 1981 (age 44); Irvine, California, U.S.
- Education: B.A. Northwestern University
- Occupation: Television reporter
- Known for: General assignment reporter at KTLA
- Spouse: Carter Evans

Lauren Lyster (born October 13, 1981) is an American journalist who formerly presented Capital Account on RT and Yahoo! Finance's Hot Stock Minute. She also worked for CBS News and ABC News and now is a reporter for KTLA in Los Angeles.

== Biography ==
Lyster was born in Irvine, California. She graduated with a bachelor's degree in journalism, with a double major in gender studies, from the Medill School of Journalism at Northwestern University. During that time she focused on miscarriages of justice (particularly on false convictions for murder) under the auspices of the Medill Innocence Project.

She entered the sphere of journalism after a career in the financial services industry, having been a senior equity analyst covering the retail sector at Tiburon Research Group in San Francisco. She then worked as a video host and correspondent for Yahoo Finance where she anchored a live daily show on the Nasdaq. She then worked as a correspondent and morning anchor at CBS News in New York before moving to Los Angeles where she worked for ABC News reporting for Good Morning America and ABC World News Tonight. She covered national news stories including the 2016 Orlando Pulse nightclub terror attack, Hurricane Matthew in Florida, wildfires in Southern California, tornadoes in Texas, the 2016 Brussels terror attack, the 2015 San Bernardino terror attack, and the 2016 Democratic National Convention.

== Personal life ==
Since 2018, she has been married to reporter Carter Evans, ex-husband of KTLA weekend anchor Courtney Friel.
