= Marta Waller =

American news reporter

- Born: September 26, 1952 (age 72); Iowa, U.S.
- Occupation(s): News anchor, journalist, educator, marketing professional
- Years active: 1971–present
- Employer: KTLA (1984–2008)
- Known for: Anchor at KTLA, coverage of O. J. Simpson trial
- Children: 3

Marta Waller (born September 26, 1952) is an American marketing professional, educator, and a former broadcast news reporter, producer, and anchor, most notably with KTLA in Los Angeles, California, where she worked from 1984 to 2008.

== Early life and education ==
Waller was born in Iowa and raised in Southern California.

== Career ==
Waller began her career in broadcast news in 1971 when she took a job as a production assistant at the KNBC Documentary Unit. Her desire to work on breaking news led her to acquire the skills she need to becoming a sound technician. Waller is one of the first women to be admitted to membership in IATSE #695, the union that represents sound technicians. She freelanced for the three major US networks and traveled with CBS News, 60 Minutes and CBS Reports.

In 1982, Waller changed her career focus, and moved from the technical to the editorial side of broadcast news. She was hired by KCOP, Channel 13, in Los Angeles as the assignment editor. 18 months later, she began writing the news at KNXT (now KCBS-TV). In the Fall of 1984, Waller spent a few months as a newswriter at KRON the NBC station in San Francisco.San Francisco.

Waller's long career at KTLA Channel 5 in Los Angeles began as a freelance news writer in December 1984. Several months later, she was named producer of the KTLA Weekend News. Her first on-air report was in June 1986. Marta began working three days a week as a reporter, while continuing to produce the weekend newscast. In September 1987, she was promoted to full-time reporter. She anchored the weekend edition of KTLA "News at Ten" with Larry McCormick from September 1993 until February 1995, when the O. J. Simpson murder trial began. Waller anchored KTLA's gavel-to-gavel of the trial coverage O. J. Simpson murder trial. During the trial, KTLA launched its "Noon News" newscast, which she anchored. At the conclusion of the trial, Marta continued anchoring the noon newscast and began co-anchoring "News at Ten" with Hal Fishman. In December 2004 she became medical and special features reporter.

Waller provided medical reports and special features for KTLA. She later assumed a new role at the station as their Internet Anchor covering the Phil Spector trial, the Southern California firestorms and the O. J. Simpson hearings in Las Vegas on KTLA and the Los Angeles Times websites.

Marta was a co-host of the Tournament of Roses pre-parade coverage (Backstage at the Parade and Parade Countdown) for 17 years.

She donated her time to Easter Seals for a decade as one of the hosts of the annual Easter Seals Telethon.

In 1997, Waller sued Tribune Broadcasting, alleging age and sex discrimination and defamation in her being stripped of her anchor duties at the station.

She left KTLA in October 2008.

She is a founder and partner in K.I.S.S. Media Company a social media marketing business based in Los Angeles. In the spring of 2014, Waller moved to Paris, France, where she was a professor of International Marketing, Corporate Strategy and Communications Techniques at Paris West University Nanterre La Défense and ParisTech École des Ponts. The courses are offered to graduate students in the School of Business and Economics and taught in English. Students come from all over the world to receive a master's degree from these programs. In the late 1990s Marta developed and taught the "Delivering the News" course at UCLA Extension. She returned to Southern California after the birth of her third grandchild to spend time with family. Waller coaches young talent to develop their skills as broadcast reporters, anchors, writers and producers, capable of producing outstanding work on both breaking, short, and long-form investigative formats. In the Fall of 2021, she returned to Europe to continue teaching and coaching international students in Paris and London.

== Awards ==
Waller has been honored multiple times for her reporting, anchoring and community service by other groups and agencies. She won the Los Angeles Press Club Award, the Edward R. Murrow Award and an Emmy Award for anchoring KTLA's coverage of the September 11 terrorist attacks. She also has several other Emmy Awards and Golden Mike Awards, including a Golden Mike Award for her gavel-to-gavel anchoring of the O. J. Simpson murder trial.

== Personal life ==
Waller is divorced. She has three daughters and three grandchildren.

== Filmography ==
Waller has played a reporter in several films and television shows.

- In the Heat of the Night episode: "Unfinished Business" (1991)
- Legalese (1998)
- Crocodile Dundee in Los Angeles (2001)
