= Robert Dyk =

American journalist (1937–2008)

Robert P. Dyk (March 6, 1937 – March 22, 2008) was an American journalist, reporter and correspondent. Dyk worked for CBS News, ABC News, KRBK-TV and WMTW during his career.

Dyk's career in network news began at CBS News as an editorial assistant at the 1960 Democratic National Convention. He moved to ABC News in 1978. He was sent to Tehran, Iran, by ABC to cover the takeover of the United States embassy and the ensuing Iran hostage crisis following the Iranian Revolution in 1979. During his career at CBS and ABC, Dyk also reported in the death of Winston Churchill, the Lebanon Civil War and riots in Los Angeles.

Dyk left network television in 1984 and was a fill-in reporter for ABC-owned KGO-TV in San Francisco. He then worked for KRBK-TV in Sacramento, California, as an anchor and reporter from 1986 to 1987. After being demoted from anchor to reporter, he moved to Maine, where he was an anchor and reporter for WMTW.

Dyk died of cancer at the age of 71 on March 22, 2008, at his home in Falmouth, Maine.
