= Making It! Minority Success Stories =

- Country of origin: United States
- Original language: English

Production
- Executive producer: Nelson Davis
- Running time: 30 minutes
- Production company: Nelson Davis Television Productions

Original release
- Network: KTLA
- Release: March 1989 – present

Making It! Minority Success Stories is a weekly, half-hour magazine format television show that showcases the stories of small business owners from across the United States with emphasis on minority and women entrepreneurs. Since its premiere in March 1989 on Los Angeles KTLA, it has featured over 1000 entrepreneur stories. Nelson Davis, the executive producer and founder of Nelson Davis Television Productions, created the show to highlight the triumphs, challenges, and contributions of minority entrepreneurs.

The program airs Sunday mornings on Los Angeles KTLA and Sunday mornings on San Diego KSWB, and is seen nationwide through carriage on cable systems and satellite.

== Format ==
The format of Making It! features two entrepreneurs' stories in each episode. Episodes begin with the segments being introduced from a set at the KTLA studio by the on-air hosts, Emmett Miller and Lynette Romero. The profiles of the entrepreneurs and their stories are videotaped on location. In addition, business experts from organizations such as the SBA, Minority Business Associations, Chambers of Commerce, and other resources provide information and perspective.

== Awards and nominations ==
The program has received over 30 awards from all levels of business and government including four Emmy Awards for best Public Affairs Series and the Media Advocate Award from the Small Business Administration.

== Correspondents and hosts ==
- Emmett Miller (co-host, 2006 – present)
- Lynette Romero (co-host, 1998 – present)
- Errol St.Clair Smith (correspondent, 1997 – present)
- Xiomara Galindo (correspondent, 1997 – present)
- Larry McCormick (co-host, 1989–2006)
- Minerva Perez (co-host, 1989–1992)
