= Sharon Ito =

American television anchor

- Born: September 3, 1960 (age 65); Sacramento, California, U.S.
- Education: University of the Pacific
- Occupation: News Anchor
- Employer(s): KXTV 1985 - 1990; KCAL 1990 - 1993; KRBK/KPWB 1993 - 1996; KXTV 1996 - 2012
- Spouse: George Warren
- Children: 1 Daughter

Sharon Tomiko Ito (born September 3, 1960, in Sacramento, California) is a Japanese-American journalist who worked in broadcasting for 30 years.

== Biography ==
Sharon Ito was born in Sacramento, California. She graduated from Sacramento's Hiram Johnson High School in 1978 and later from the University of the Pacific in Stockton, California with a Bachelor of Arts degree in communications. Ito was recognized with multiple awards during her career including a Golden Mike Award from the Los Angeles Radio-TV News Directors Association for her work during the 1992 Los Angeles riots. She was also recognized by the Society of Professional Journalists (Sacramento chapter) for feature reporting. She was active with the Sacramento chapter of the Asian American Journalists Association (AAJA).

After working at radio stations KJOY Stockton and KGNR in Sacramento, Ito began her TV career at KXTV News10 in Sacramento in 1985 as a producer and news reporter. She left in 1990 to join Disney's startup television station KCAL-TV in Los Angeles as a reporter, and in 1993 came back home to KRBK-TV/KPWB-TV, now known as KMAX CW 31 in Sacramento. In September 1996, she returned to KXTV as weekend anchor and weekday reporter. In April 2002, Ito switched spots with weekday morning anchor Alicia Malaby and anchored News10 Good Morning from April 2002 to March 2007 with Dan Elliott. In May 2007 KXTV launched an online project on news10.net called Live_Online, with Ito interviewing newsmakers and interacting with viewers. Ito retired from broadcast news and left the station on March 25, 2012.

In 2013 Ito joined Sacramento State University's College of Continuing Education where she worked in communications and public affairs until 2020.

Ito has been active in the effort to recognize Sacramento's historic Japantown , which was a vibrant immigrant community until the incarceration of Japanese Americans during World War II which, along with redevelopment in the 1950s, led to its demise.

The Japanese American Citizens League honored Ito in 2024 for her work as an advocate for Japanese Americans.

== Personal ==
Ito lives in Sacramento and is married to former KXTV News10/ABC10 reporter George Warren. They have one daughter.
