= Carlos Amezcua =

American news anchor

- Born: San Diego, California, US
- Occupation: Television news anchor
- Known for: KTLA Morning News
- Notable work: 22 Emmys
- Website: Official website

Carlos Amezcua is an American journalist best known for his sixteen years as the original co-anchor for the KTLA Morning News, with Barbara Beck as his co-anchor, Mark Kriski handling weather and Sam Rubin reporting on the entertainment industry. Airing at 5:00 am, the crew became comfortable and humor crept into the newscasts. Managing executive Steve Bell described the show as, "the first one with the crazy anchors". In September 2007, Amezcua left KTLA for KTTV, where he replaced John Beard as anchor of the Fox 11 News at 10:00 pm; he left KTTV in 2013 to establish his own media company, Carlos Media Corporation. From 2015 to 2019, he served as a co-anchor at KUSI-TV San Diego. He is currently (2020) the co-host of the Carlos & Lisa show (Lisa Remillard) on BEONDTV, and KDOC-TV Los Angeles.

Born in San Diego, Amezcua is the son of Don Oscar Amezcua, a member of the Mariachi Vargas de Tecalitlán and founder of Mariachi Guadalajara. Amezcua has lent his voice to the Latin Grammy Awards and has a gold record for his translation of "Let it Snow" for Chicago's Chicago XXV: The Christmas Album. He served as a missionary for the Church of Jesus Christ of Latter-day Saints in Guatemala/El Salvador from 1973 to 1975 and attended Brigham Young University studying journalism (1975). He also read the Christmas story with Chuck Henry for a program associated with the lighting of the Los Angeles California Temple in 1998.

== Awards ==
- 22 Emmy Awards
- National Impact Award for Excellence in Broadcast Journalism
- Radio Television News Association Golden Mike Award
- George Foster Peabody Award (with his team)
