= Gayle Anderson =

American journalist

Gayle Anderson is a reporter for KTLA Morning News.

Starting with KTLA-TV in 1993, she has won three regional Emmys:

- 1993, Best Live Coverage of the Malibu Fires.
- 1994, Best Live Coverage of the Northridge earthquake.
- 1994, Best Live Reporting for Morning News.

In January 2002, she won an APTRA Award for "Best Live Coverage of a News Event", and just days later was selected to run a portion of the Winter Olympics Torch Run through Southern California.
