= John D. Silva =

American electronics engineer (1920–2012)

- Born: February 20, 1920; San Diego, California, U.S.
- Died: November 27, 2012 (aged 92); Camarillo, California, U.S.
- Education: Stanford University
- Occupation: Engineer
- Known for: Inventor of the telecopter
- Awards: Emmy Award (1974)
- Military career
- Allegiance: United States
- Branch: United States Navy
- Service years: 1942–1945
- Rank: Radar Operator
- Conflicts: World War II

John D. Silva (1920–2012) was the chief engineer for KTLA-TV in Los Angeles, California who is famous for inventing the first telecopter, or a helicopter fitted with a TV camera in 1958.

John D. Silva was born in San Diego, California on February 20, 1920 and studied engineering at Stanford University. In 1942 he joined the Navy as a radar operator and was among the 91 wounded when the destroyer USS Shea was attacked by Japanese bombers during World War II. After the war, he moved to Los Angeles to join Paramount Pictures, which at the time was operating an experimental TV station, W6XYZ, later to become KTLA-TV. He was KTLA’s chief engineer for 21 years, which was where he invented the telecopter.

Silva began designing and building an aerial broadcasting studio with a rented Bell Helicopter in a North Hollywood backyard in secret so as not to alert other TV stations. KTLA spent $40,000 on broadcasting equipment for the helicopter. Silva configured the equipment to weigh a mere 368 pounds rather than its usual 2,000 pounds so that the helicopter would be able to take off. He won an Emmy in 1974 for his invention as well as over 40 national and local awards for his live coverage of various events.

In 1978 Silva left KTLA to become an electronics design consultant.

Silva died of complications of pneumonia on November 27, 2012, in Camarillo, California, at age 92.
