= Telecopter =

Television news helicopter

A telecopter is a helicopter used to gather footage for television stations. It is a portmanteau of television and helicopter.

The KTLA Telecopter was the world's first television news helicopter, which first went into operation in 1958 and was invented by John D. Silva. The on-board video and audio equipment communicated with a line of sight KTLA transmitter receiver on top of Mount Wilson. The first helicopter was leased to KTLA by National Helicopter Service and Engineering Company in Van Nuys. For several years, KTLA (channel 5) was the only TV station with a helicopter based TV camera crewed reporting platform.

The Telecopter was designed and introduced by KTLA chief engineer John D. Silva (1920-2012).

Today, KTLA's news helicopter is known as "Sky 5" and it is used during breaking news coverage.

== Versions ==
The first three Telecopters were:

Version	Year	Helicopter	Notes
1	1958	Bell 47G-2	Equipment mounted externally
2	1959	Bell 47J-2 Ranger	Equipment mounted internally
3	1969	Bell 206 JetRanger	
