= Sam Rubin =

American journalist (1960–2024)

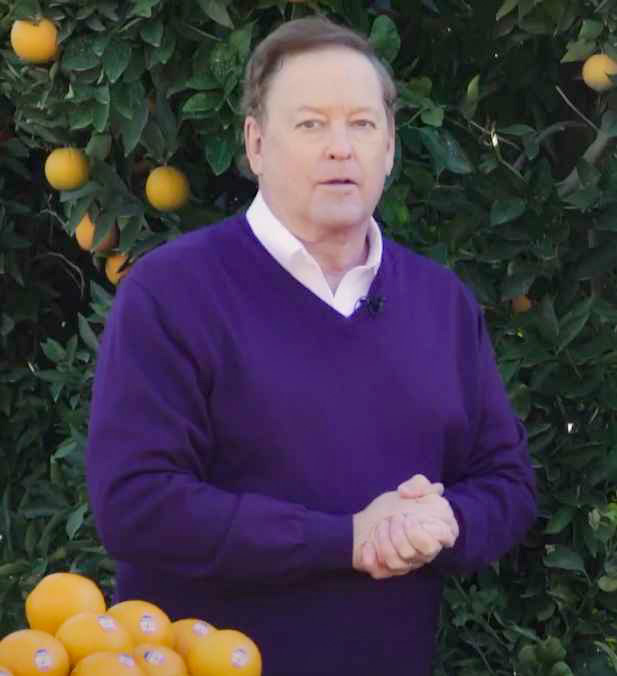
- Rubin in 2022
- Born: February 16, 1960; San Diego, California, U.S.
- Died: May 10, 2024 (aged 64); Los Angeles, California, U.S.
- Burial place: Mount Sinai Memorial Park Cemetery, Simi Valley, California, U.S.
- Education: Occidental College (BA)
- Occupation: Entertainment journalist
- Years active: 1991–2024
- Employers: KTLA; Reelz Channel; WGN; ITV
- Spouse(s): Julie Anderson (m. 1988; div. 2006) Leslie Gale Shuman (m. 2007)
- Children: 4
- Awards: Golden Mike Award

Sam Rubin (February 16, 1960 – May 10, 2024) was an American journalist who served as the entertainment reporter for the KTLA Morning News and as a television host of entertainment talk shows and specials. He reported on the entertainment industry for over thirty years and interviewed many Hollywood stars. He was also the co-author of two biographies, one on the former first lady Jacqueline Onassis and another about actress Mia Farrow.

== Career ==
Sam Rubin was born in San Diego on February 16, 1960. In the 1980s, he was an entertainment reporter for Group W, the National Enquirer, and Fox Entertainment News. Beginning in 1988, he hosted hourly entertainment newsbreaks for the Movietime cable channel.

=== KTLA ===
Rubin joined KTLA in 1991, two months after the station started its morning news program, KTLA Morning News. The newscast had initially been faltering in the ratings with a straightforward format in the vein of its 10 p.m. newscast; its original anchors—Carlos Amezcua and Barbara Beck—loosened up the format. Rubin's introduction to the show coincided with an increase in celebrity interviews on the program. Ray Richmond of The Orange County Register credited Rubin as being "the missing piece" to the original cast.

Rubin was known for his frequent jokes about movies and TV, including personnel at competing TV stations. In a 1992 interview, he climbed into a bed between Roseanne Barr and Tom Arnold. At times, Rubin's remarks agitated KTLA colleagues and management. In 1993, he joked that Hal Fishman, one of KTLA's main evening news anchors, "once wore a skirt for a co-anchor job in Spokane" making a comparison between Fishman and actor Dustin Hoffman (referring to Hoffman in Tootsie). The remark irked Fishman, who enlisted his lawyer, noted that he was "not a cross-dresser", said that he had never spent any significant amount of time in Spokane, and hinted at possibly leaving the station. Rubin apologized and was reprimanded by KTLA. In 1998, 2002, and 2004, KTLA suspended Rubin for comments he made about KTLA's assistant news director, KABC-TV's general manager, and the station's new set, respectively.

Twice in the 1990s, KTLA tapped Rubin to co-host new local shows. In 1993, it debuted The Morning Show at 9 a.m., which was hosted by the KTLA Morning News team but was strictly a talk show. The program was intended for national syndication but found little interest, so KTLA canceled it within a year. In 1998, Sam joined Stephanie Edwards for The Live Show, which ran 26 weeks. In addition, he hosted and produced award show specials for KTLA.

During a live on-air interview with actor Samuel L. Jackson on February 10, 2014, Rubin mistakenly asked Jackson about the success of the trailer advertised at the Super Bowl, which featured African American actor and former Jackson co-star Laurence Fishburne, who had reprised his role as Morpheus from The Matrix franchise for a car commercial. Jackson was offended by the mistaken reference and, in response, berated Rubin. In his apology, Rubin claimed he was referring to another commercial which did feature Jackson. That commercial, for Captain America: The Winter Soldier, was also screened at the Super Bowl. Rubin said he had not brought it up during the interview itself because he felt "stupid". At the same time, he said that Jackson had misinterpreted what he said. Rubin, nevertheless, chastised himself for what he called "a very amateur mistake".

As an entertainment correspondent at KTLA, he frequently appeared on other media outlets, including KNX, The Joan Rivers Show, and the WGN Morning News. He was also the regular Hollywood entertainment reporter in the UK on ITV's This Morning as well as for Australia's Nine Network on Today and Today Extra.

Though edgy, Rubin was considered to have conventional tastes. He was known for rarely being probing in interviews and generally being positive, which made him a favorite among Hollywood publicists; his easygoing manner was known to put celebrities at ease. Henry Winkler noted that he could make guests "open up like a flower". Rubin went on paid press junkets, unlike most journalists who shun the practice for ethical reasons. In 2012, he attended a press event for the film The Place Beyond the Pines at the urging of his daughter, who was 17. She wanted her father to ask her favorite actor, Ryan Gosling, questions.

=== Other television programs ===
In 1996, Rubin and Dorothy Lucey—the entertainment reporter for KTTV—co-hosted a syndicated talk show, Scoop with Sam and Dorothy, which aired locally on KTLA. The syndicator, ACI, intended Scoop to be a competitor to the successful Live with Regis and Kathie Lee. The program launched although it had less national clearance than the industry standard for new syndicated offerings; it was canceled due to low ratings after three months on the air. Beginning in 2006, Rubin hosted Dailies, the flagship program of the newly relaunched Reelz Channel. For Reelz, Rubin moderated an entertainment panel show, Hollywood Uncensored with Sam Rubin, which aired from 2010 to 2012 with a run of 120 episodes.

=== Industry involvement ===
Rubin was one of the founding members of the Broadcast Film Critics Association, which organizes the Critics' Choice Movie Awards. In 2004, he helped the awards land on The WB—their first time on broadcast TV—after he along with other members who were employed by Tribune Broadcasting–owned WB affiliates pitched the idea to the network. Rubin hosted the 18th edition of the event, held in 2013.

He was honored during his career with a Golden Mike Award for best entertainment reporter and a lifetime achievement award from the Los Angeles Press Club in 2010. Rubin made appearances as himself in several films, including Wes Craven's New Nightmare (1994) and America's Sweethearts (2001).

== Personal life and legacy ==
Rubin was born in San Diego and attended high school in Los Angeles. He graduated from Occidental College with a Bachelor of Arts degree in American studies and rhetoric in 1982. He was married to Julie Anderson and then to Leslie Gale Shuman; he had four children (two with each spouse). On May 10, 2024, Rubin had a heart attack at his home in Los Angeles; he was rushed to the hospital, where he died. His final television appearance was the day before.

On May 28, a petition was initiated on Change.org to commemorate Rubin with a star on the Hollywood Walk of Fame.

== Books ==
- Rubin, Sam; Richard Taylor (1989). Mia Farrow: Flower Child, Madonna, Muse. New York: 2M Communications; St. Martin's Press. ISBN 9780312029500. OCLC 19220985.
- Taylor, Richard; Sam Rubin (1990). Jackie: A Lasting Impression. New York: St. Martin's Press. ISBN 9780312912666. OCLC 243731979.
