= KMAX-TV =

Television station in Sacramento, California

- Sacramento–Stockton–Modesto, California; United States
- City: Sacramento, California
- Channels: Digital: 24 (UHF); Virtual: 31
- Branding: KMAX 31

Programming
- Affiliations: 31.1: Independent; for others, see § Subchannels

Ownership
- Owner: CBS Television Stations; (Sacramento Television Stations Inc.)
- Sister stations: KOVR

History
- First air date: October 5, 1974
- Former call signs: KRAK-TV (CP, 1968–1969); KRAQ (CP, 1969–1971); KMUV-TV (1971–1981); KRBK-TV (1981–1995); KPWB-TV (1995–1998)
- Former channel numbers: Analog: 31 (UHF, 1974–2009); Digital: 21 (UHF, 2003–2020)
- Former affiliations: Independent (1974–1995); The WB (1995–1998); UPN (1998–2006); The CW (2006–2023)

Technical information
- Licensing authority: FCC
- Facility ID: 51499
- ERP: 1,000 kW
- HAAT: 591.1 m (1,939 ft)
- Transmitter coordinates: 38°14′24″N 121°30′7″W

Links
- Public license information: Public file; LMS
- Website: www.cbsnews.com/gooddaysacramento/

KMAX-TV (channel 31) is an independent television station in Sacramento, California, United States. It is owned by the CBS Television Stations group alongside Stockton-licensed KOVR (channel 13), the market's CBS owned-and-operated station. The two stations share studios on KOVR Drive in West Sacramento; KMAX-TV's transmitter is located in Walnut Grove, California.

Channel 31 began broadcasting on October 5, 1974, as KMUV-TV. It was built by the Grayson Television Company and originally featured a lineup heavy on movies. The station was not a financial success and, after filing for bankruptcy reorganization, became a primarily Spanish-language station. During this time, two groups looked at using channel 31 for over-the-air subscription television, but after Tandem Productions and Jerry Perenchio acquired it in 1980, they decided not to enter the competitive market and immediately sold. The new owners, Koplar Communications, relaunched the station in 1981 as KRBK-TV, a general-entertainment independent outlet. During the 1980s, KRBK-TV became more competitive with Sacramento's leading independent, KTXL, and established a local news presence. From 1988 to 2002, it was the broadcast home of Sacramento Kings basketball.

Facing a heavy debt load, Koplar sold KRBK-TV to Pappas Telecasting in 1993. In 1995, the station affiliated with The WB, changed its call sign to KPWB-TV, and launched a morning show that became Good Day Sacramento (now Good Day), a station fixture since. KPWB-TV was acquired by the Paramount Stations Group in 1997 and became an owned-and-operated station for UPN as KMAX-TV in January 1998; Paramount, which at the time was dismantling newscasts and news departments at many of its stations, discontinued channel 31's evening newscasts but retained and expanded Good Day Sacramento. KMAX-TV and KOVR became a duopoly in 2005, with channel 31 moving into KOVR's West Sacramento studios; the next year, the station became a charter outlet of The CW, an affiliation it retained until 2023. In addition to Good Day, KMAX-TV airs a prime time newscast at 8 p.m. as well as local sports.

== KMUV-TV: Early years ==
=== Construction ===
In 1966, the Federal Communications Commission (FCC) received two applications to build a new television station in Sacramento on ultra high frequency (UHF) channel 15. The Grayson Television Company, headed by Sidney Grayson of Sacramento, and the Hercules Broadcasting Company, owners of Sacramento radio station KRAK, each sought the channel. Grayson attempted to reach an agreement with Hercules to end the proceeding by having the latter withdraw its application; Grayson alleged that Hercules had agreed to withdraw only to later renege, resulting in a lawsuit. While Hercules won the construction permit in July 1968 after a settlement with Grayson, Grayson bought the permit in 1970 from Hercules with hopes of opening it in 1972. That year, the FCC switched the construction permit for KMUV-TV from channel 15 to channel 31 out of concerns that the new station would interfere with public safety radio systems using nearby spectrum in San Francisco.

In March 1973, Grayson received final engineering approval from the FCC. It leased land for studios in Sacramento and a tower in Walnut Grove. After several construction delays, KMUV-TV began broadcasting on October 5, 1974. When the station went on, it was an independent station whose programming consisted nearly entirely of movies, with three films to be telecast each day and repeated. The primary interruption was an early morning program in Spanish, Nuestra Casa es Su Casa.

KMUV-TV's attempts to get on the air caused a dispute that almost led the FCC to deny the license renewal of its principal competitor, KTXL (channel 40). KTXL attempted to show to the FCC that Grayson Television was unqualified to be a broadcast licensee, in opposition to the channel change from 15 to 31. KTXL owner Camellia City Telecasters submitted a pleading containing what purported to be a telex message from Dun & Bradstreet. The alleged telex claimed that Sidney Grayson was the president of Grayson Television, even though he had previously been convicted of income tax evasion. In actuality, Grayson was not a corporate officer but a general manager. In August 1974, the FCC opened a hearing into charges the teletype was forged. In 1975, Grayson Television sued Camellia City for $7.5 million, claiming the filing was an attempt to prevent KMUV-TV from being constructed. The next year, an administrative law judge issued an initial decision finding against KTXL and recommended its license not be renewed. Shortly after, KMUV won $150,000 in a settlement with Camellia City. The FCC voted in June 1978 to overturn the recommendation and renew the KTXL license.

=== Non-English broadcasting ===
KMUV-TV struggled financially. It filed for Chapter 11 bankruptcy reorganization in April 1976, facing 11 lawsuits for nonpayment and owing banks and one of its officers. By then, shareholders in Channel 31, Inc.—the former Grayson Television—were negotiating with Pappas Associates, led by Mike Pappas and his brothers Harry and Pete. The Pappas family—owners of KMPH-TV in Visalia and radio stations—announced plans to switch channel 31 to a station focusing primarily on Spanish-language programming as well as shows catering to other ethnic groups, which took effect on May 3. Pappas Associates had intended to buy a minority stake in the station but found itself unable to do so due to FCC regulations; instead, Mike Pappas obtained an option to buy it outright. The station had a limited amount of Spanish-language local programming; it aired the local magazine program El Pueblo, produced by a Catholic organization, as well as a regular program on the California State Legislature and a weekly cooking show.

Beginning in 1978, a series of potential ownership deals could have seen channel 31 become an over-the-air subscription television (STV) station for Sacramento. In March, Sacramento Television Inc. agreed to acquire KMUV-TV, owned at that time by Channel 31, Inc. as a debtor in possession. Eighty percent of the firm was owned by Carl B. Hilliard Jr., a San Diego attorney. The remainder was held by Universal Subscription Television (US-TV), which was mostly owned by the Canadian CanWest Capital Corporation. Universal was in the process of signing up stations for potential conversion to subscription service across the country. The deal never panned out, though in July 1980, the FCC approved the $7.7 million acquisition of KMUV-TV by Tandem Productions and Jerry Perenchio, who likewise wished to offer a subscription service over channel 31. The two were partners in the ON TV STV service offered by WXON in Detroit, while Perenchio at the time owned WNJU-TV in the New York City market and part of the subscription television service on KBSC-TV in Los Angeles.

== KRBK-TV: The Koplar years ==
Within months of buying KMUV-TV, Tandem and Perenchio decided not to build it as a subscription station in the face of heavy competition from cable television and microwave distribution systems. As a result, they agreed to sell the station to Koplar Broadcasting, owner of KPLR-TV in St. Louis. Koplar declared it would not operate channel 31 with STV.

In KMUV-TV, Koplar found what amounted to a blank slate. The station had negligible viewership. Gail Brekke, who left her post as KPLR-TV's national sales manager to become the general manager in Sacramento, found only four usable chairs and ten working telephones. The station was completely relaunched as KRBK-TV, (Note: The call sign had a history with Koplar before and after channel 31. The station was named for Ted J. Koplar's older brother, Robert Bernard Koplar, who died in 1976. The KRBK designation had originally been proposed for a station Koplar planned to build in Des Moines, Iowa, in 1979.) a general-entertainment independent station, on April 6, 1981. The staff grew from 8 to 45 within a year, while satellite receiving equipment was added. An early focus for the revamped KRBK-TV was children's programming, largely because children tended to seek out new stations more than their parents. In 1984, Koplar moved KRBK-TV's transmitter to the 1,800-foot (550 m) level of the new KCRA-TV tower in Walnut Grove, moving some 800 feet (240 m) above its prior site; the next year, it began telecasting in stereo. By 1985, KRBK-TV had gained market share and narrowed the gap with KTXL.

When the NBA's Kansas City Kings relocated to Sacramento and became the Sacramento Kings in 1985, their first television partner was then-ABC affiliate KOVR (channel 13), which broadcast 20 games a season of the new club. The rights came up for bid in 1988, and KRBK offered to telecast 30 games. While KRBK bid less than KOVR, and KOVR had a right to match KRBK's offer, it did not do so, and KRBK was granted the rights. Grant Napear became the new play-by-play announcer for the team after it moved its games to channel 31. The agreement was renewed in 1990.

=== Starting a news operation ===
Two years after relaunching channel 31, Koplar added a local 10 p.m. newscast to the station's schedule, a small effort hosted by Gary Lindsey (previously of KSBW in Salinas). The newscast, despite modest resources, was intended to compete with KTXL's 10 p.m. newscast. Prime News moved from 10 to 10:30 p.m. in March 1985, but Koplar soon opted to retool the news department altogether and took it off the air that July.

The revamped 31 News Tonight debuted on January 27, 1986. Its lead female anchor was Christine Craft, who had made headlines for an age and sex discrimination lawsuit against her prior employer, KMBC-TV in Kansas City. The new newscast failed to attract significant viewership: in May 1986, it managed an audience share of just two percent. Within a year, anchor Tim Klein was dismissed and replaced with Robert Dyk, a network news veteran. When original sports director Rich Gould left KRBK-TV for KPLR-TV in 1987, he was replaced by Grant Napear, who moved from WAND in Decatur, Illinois.

The 10 p.m. newscast moved to 9 p.m. in September 1989, a move designed to reduce competition with KTXL and the threat that KCRA could change its 11 p.m. local news to 10 p.m. The move immediately resulted in ratings increases. Craft departed the next month to study law.

Scott Jones arrived from West Palm Beach, Florida, to become KRBK-TV's news director in 1990. Jones set out to make the newscast faster-paced with a higher story count and an emphasis on crime and education stories. In the November 1990 survey, the newscast increased its audience share from three to five percent. A second nightly newscast, at 9:30 p.m., debuted in September 1991; the separate news program in lieu of an hour-long newscast allowed the same reporters to return and update stories in the second half-hour. Jones departed in 1992 to take a corporate position with Koplar Communications.

== KPWB-TV: Pappas ownership, WB affiliation, and 31 Action News ==
Through 1993, rumors continued of a possible sale of KRBK-TV amid concern for the financial future of Koplar Communications. The company's stations had suffered from the early 1990s recession, increased competition, and a high load of commitments to unsuccessful programming. Expensive programming purchases accelerated a spiral of borrowing that had begun with the KRBK-TV acquisition in 1981 but was masked by the solid performance of KPLR-TV in St. Louis. Broadcasting magazine reported in February that syndicators, who supply television programs, were meeting to review Koplar's indebtedness as well as a rumor that KRBK-TV was up for sale along with a second Sacramento-market independent station, KSCH-TV (channel 58), to be packaged together for possible consolidation.

The Tribune Company negotiated to acquire the two stations, but talks—prolonged by syndicators' objections to proposed concessions and contract forgiveness—fell through after ten months. Instead, Pappas Telecasting purchased KRBK-TV and provided a program-buying alliance for KPLR-TV, which remained with Koplar. The $22 million acquisition closed in July 1994, at which time Pappas imposed a new dress code on station employees that prohibited women from wearing slacks.

Just before Koplar sold channel 31, it committed the station to The WB, a new television network slated for a 1995 launch. When The WB debuted on January 11, 1995, KRBK-TV became KPWB-TV for its new owner (Pappas) and network (WB). Additionally, the station renewed its agreement with the Kings and expanded it to 35 telecasts a season; the team cut back to 25 games a year beginning in the 1996–97 season.

In preparation for the switch, 31 News moved in September 1994 from its double-half-hour format at 9 p.m. to 10 p.m., putting it back into competition with KTXL and KSCH, and introduced weekend reports. In spite of its more limited resources—the station had 25 employees in news, a third the size of its rivals—and its third-place ratings at 10, KPWB attempted to remain competitive on reporting with the four other local TV news departments with creative coverage decisions. Competition was fiercer at 10 because there were three other newscasts in the time period, from Fox affiliate KTXL; KQCA (the former KSCH-TV), which offered news produced by KCRA-TV; and KOVR, which switched to CBS in 1995 and simultaneously adopted early prime time scheduling with its late news at 10 p.m.

Pappas invested in the news product, quadrupling the size of the KPWB newsroom and launching a local morning program, The Morning Show, in August 1995. The evening news coverage was rebranded 31 Action News in January 1996 and reformatted from an hour-long report at 10 to half-hour newscasts at 7 and 10 p.m. designed to cater to busy viewers. The existing anchor team of John Malos and Sharon Ito was replaced by John Alston, who came from WSB-TV in Atlanta. 31 Action News expanded to add news at 11:30 a.m. in August 1996 and 11 p.m. in June 1997, bringing KPWB-TV's local news output to five hours a day—second only to KCRA-TV. KPWB-TV also provided management services to two other Pappas stations—WB affiliate KREN-TV and Univision outlet KUVR-LP—in Reno, Nevada.

== KMAX-TV: Paramount ownership and switch to UPN ==
KMAX logos as a UPN station

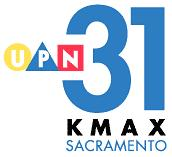
1998–2002

2002–2006

On July 16, 1997, the Paramount Stations Group announced a deal to purchase KPWB-TV from Pappas. Paramount was the half-owner of The WB's primary competitor, UPN, and the purchase was immediately seen as portending an affiliation switch for the station. Paramount's corporate parent, Viacom, paid for KPWB-TV at a purchase price exceeding $100 million with proceeds from the sale of WVIT, the NBC affiliate it owned in Connecticut, to the NBC network. Broadcasting & Cable reported that Paramount pursued the station because it had become aware that UPN's existing Sacramento-market affiliate, KQCA, planned not to renew.

Channel 31 became Sacramento's UPN station on January 5, 1998, with WB programming moving to KQCA. It simultaneously changed its call sign to KMAX-TV (the first choice of KSUN-TV being unavailable), instituted early prime time for UPN programming (7–9 p.m. instead of 8–10 p.m.), and restored the 9 p.m. news hour that had been successful prior to WB affiliation. Though Paramount initially promised further news investment along with an upgraded syndicated programming inventory and larger sales force, the early prime time schedule and new news time slots did not last the year in spite of producing the station's highest news ratings in three years. On August 14, 1998, KMAX-TV aired its final evening newscast after twelve and a half years and moved UPN programming to a traditional 8–10 p.m. schedule. Elliott Troshinsky, the station's general manager, described the move as supporting UPN, which that season moved to five nights of programming. The move dovetailed with a general retreat from news by Paramount stations; Paramount had canceled outsourced local newscasts for its stations in Columbus, Ohio; Providence, Rhode Island; and Norfolk, Virginia, in 1997. The next year, it shut down the entire local news operation at WTOG-TV in St. Petersburg, Florida, and proceeded to do so at KSTW serving Seattle. Also in 1998, it scrapped the outsourced newscast aired by WSBK-TV in Boston. Viacom merged with CBS in 2000 and combined the Paramount Stations Group and the 16 CBS owned-and-operated stations under one unit.

During the 2002 NBA playoffs, in which the Sacramento Kings participated, KMAX offered pre- and post-game editions of Good Day Sacramento. This upset the Kings, which believed the station had to share revenue earned from the advertising in team-adjacent programming with the team. By this time, the owners, Maloof Sports and Entertainment, had bought airtime from KMAX, producing the 25 Kings telecasts and selling the advertising themselves; in addition, KMAX aired some games of the co-owned Sacramento Monarchs women's basketball team. The NBA team filed a successful arbitration claim against KMAX to void the contract; the Kings then awarded the rights to Sacramento's ABC affiliate, KXTV (channel 10), ending channel 31's nearly 15 years of airing Kings basketball.

== Duopoly with KOVR ==
In December 2004, the Viacom Television Stations Group agreed to acquire KOVR from Sinclair Broadcast Group for $285 million. The sale fit into both companies' strategies to pursue duopolies in as many markets as possible. KMAX-TV moved into KOVR's studios in West Sacramento, and 11 newly redundant employees across the combined staff were laid off.

Former CW 31 logo

The WB and UPN effectively merged in 2006 to form The CW; KMAX, along with ten other UPN owned-and-operated stations, was immediately named one of the network's stations. Despite being combined with KOVR, an evening newscast was not immediately restored to channel 31's lineup. By 2019, the station was airing a weeknight 6:30 p.m. newscast.

On October 3, 2022, Nexstar Media Group acquired majority ownership of The CW. Under the agreement, CBS was given the right to pull its affiliations from KMAX and its seven other CW stations. On May 5, 2023, CBS announced that it would exercise that right, with KMAX-TV ceasing to air the network's programming at the end of August and reverting to an independent station; the CW affiliation moved to KQCA.

== Local programming ==
=== Good Day ===
On August 14, 1995, while owned by Pappas, KPWB-TV debuted The Morning Show, a three-hour blend of news, features, and traffic and weather information designed to provide local competition to the national morning newscasts. After eight months on the air, The Morning Show was renamed Good Day Sacramento to emphasize its local content. The formula of weather and traffic, entertainment, and personality drew viewers; by early 1998, it had tripled its market share to become the second-highest-rated morning program on Sacramento television, behind NBC's Today.

Originally three hours in duration from 6 to 9 a.m., Good Day Sacramento moved its start time up to 5:30 a.m. in August 1998, coinciding with the end of evening newscasts. The show added a 9 a.m. hour in 2000, and in 2002, it expanded to 5 a.m., bringing its total duration to five hours.

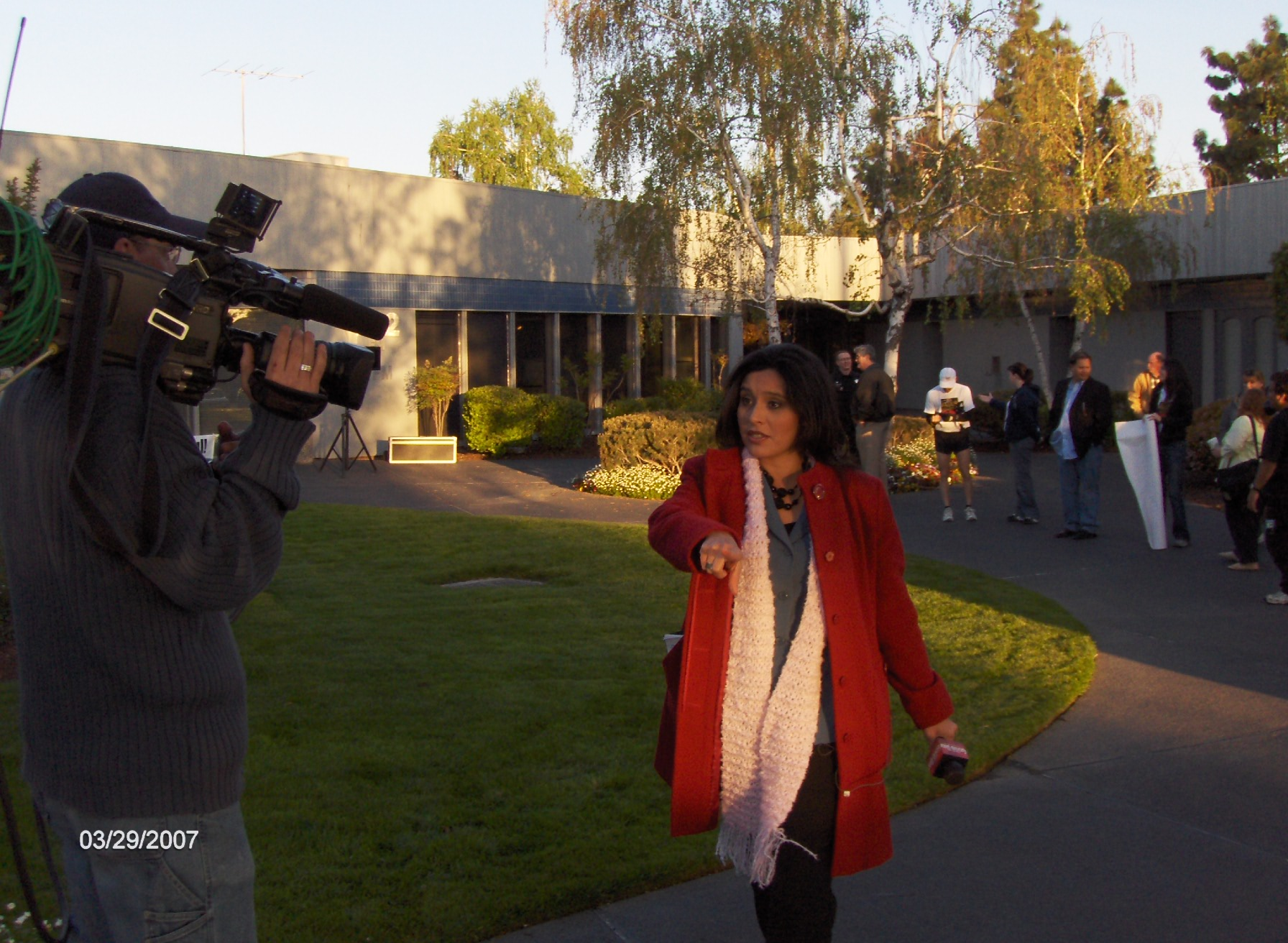
KMAX-TV's Julissa Ortiz setting up to report for Good Day Sacramento in 2007

In the early 2000s, the station twice attempted an evening spinoff of Good Day Sacramento. The first version, Good Evening Sacramento—hosted by Mark S. Allen, a reporter for the day program who joined shortly after launch, and Gary Gelfand—aired for several months in 2001. A second incarnation under the same title, hosted originally by Beth Ruyak and later by Good Day host Marianne McClary with Allen, ran from August 2003 to September 2004. Heretofore broadcast on weekdays only, Good Day Sacramento debuted weekend editions after Good Evening was canceled.

In 2009, the weekday edition of Good Day Sacramento began starting at 4:30 a.m.; it was extended to end at 11 a.m. in 2020, when the program was partitioned into a 4:30–7 a.m. block simulcast by KOVR and KMAX and a 7–11 a.m. block only aired on channel 31. The program was retitled Good Day in 2019 to reflect cities other than Sacramento that it covers.

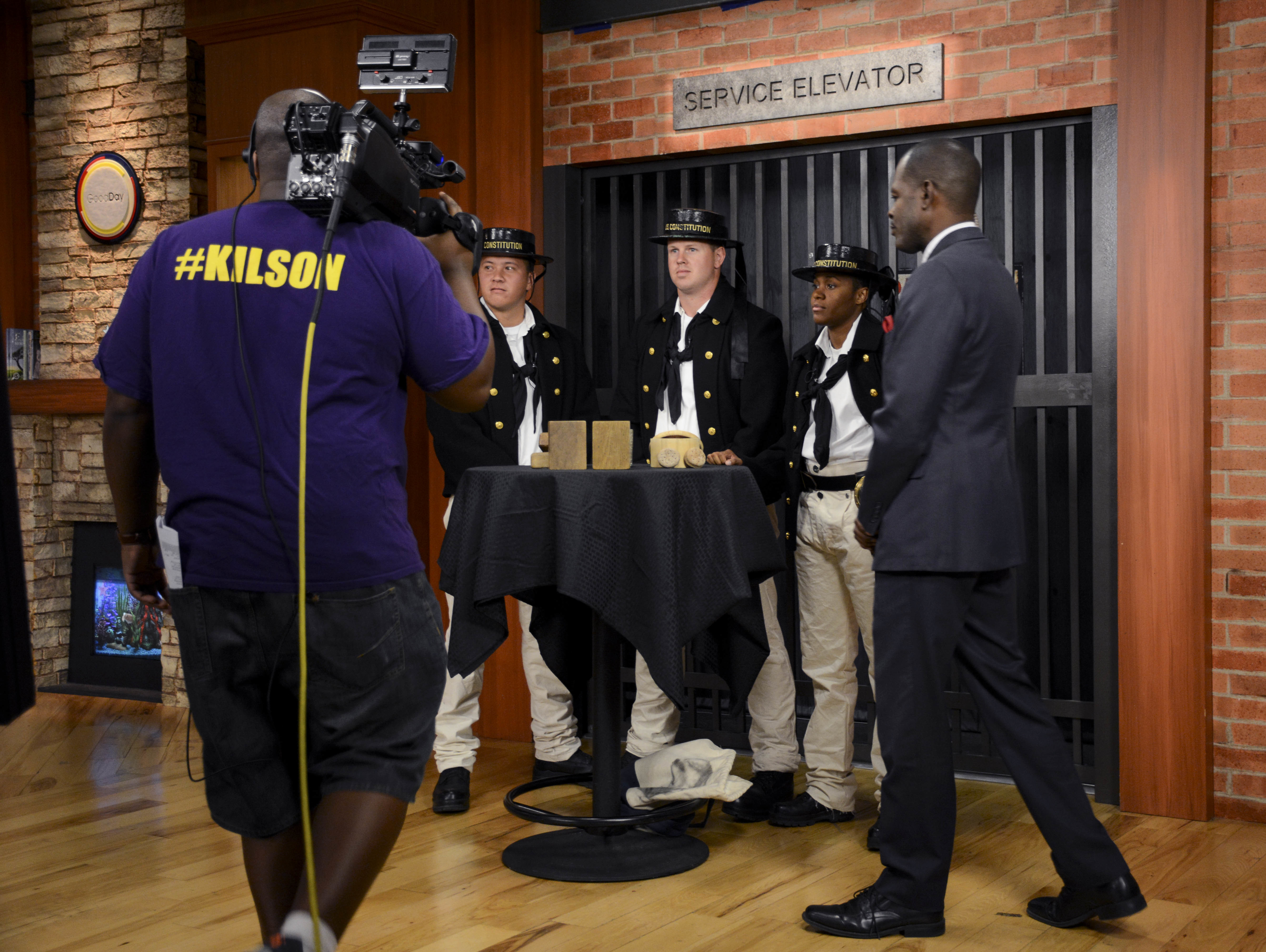
A segment shot in the Good Day Sacramento studio in 2016

=== Primetime Sacramento ===
To fill some of the hours vacated by CW programming when KMAX-TV became an independent station in 2023, the station debuted Primetime Sacramento, an 8 p.m. news hour hosted by Tony Lopez. The time slot was chosen by KOVR–KMAX general manager Deborah Collura as a likely first for the market.

=== Sports ===
KMAX has broadcast all Sacramento State Hornets football home games since 2019; in 2024, the station aired a Hornets road game at Fresno State.

=== Notable former on-air staff ===
- Chris Burrous – anchor/reporter for Good Day Sacramento, c. 2005–2010
- Kinsey Schofield – anchor/reporter for Good Day Sacramento, 2017

== Technical information ==
=== Subchannels ===
KMAX-TV's transmitter is located on the KXTV/KOVR tower in Walnut Grove, California. The station's signal is multiplexed:

Subchannels of KMAX-TV
Subchannel	Res.	Short name	Programming
31.1	1080i	KMAX-DT	Main KMAX-TV programming
31.2	480i	NOSEY	Nosey
31.3	480i	QVC1	QVC
31.4	480i	QVC2	QVC2
31.5	480i	Movies	Movies!
31.6	480i	MeToons	MeTV Toons
31.7	480i	TLMD33	Telemundo (KCSO-LD)

Simulcast of subchannels of another station

=== Analog-to-digital conversion ===
KMAX-TV began broadcasting a digital signal on channel 21 on June 19, 2003. The analog signal on channel 31 shut down on June 12, 2009, as part of the transition to digital television. The digital signal was relocated from channel 21 to channel 24 on May 1, 2020, as a result of the 2016 United States wireless spectrum auction.
