= Courtney Friel =

American television journalist (born 1980)

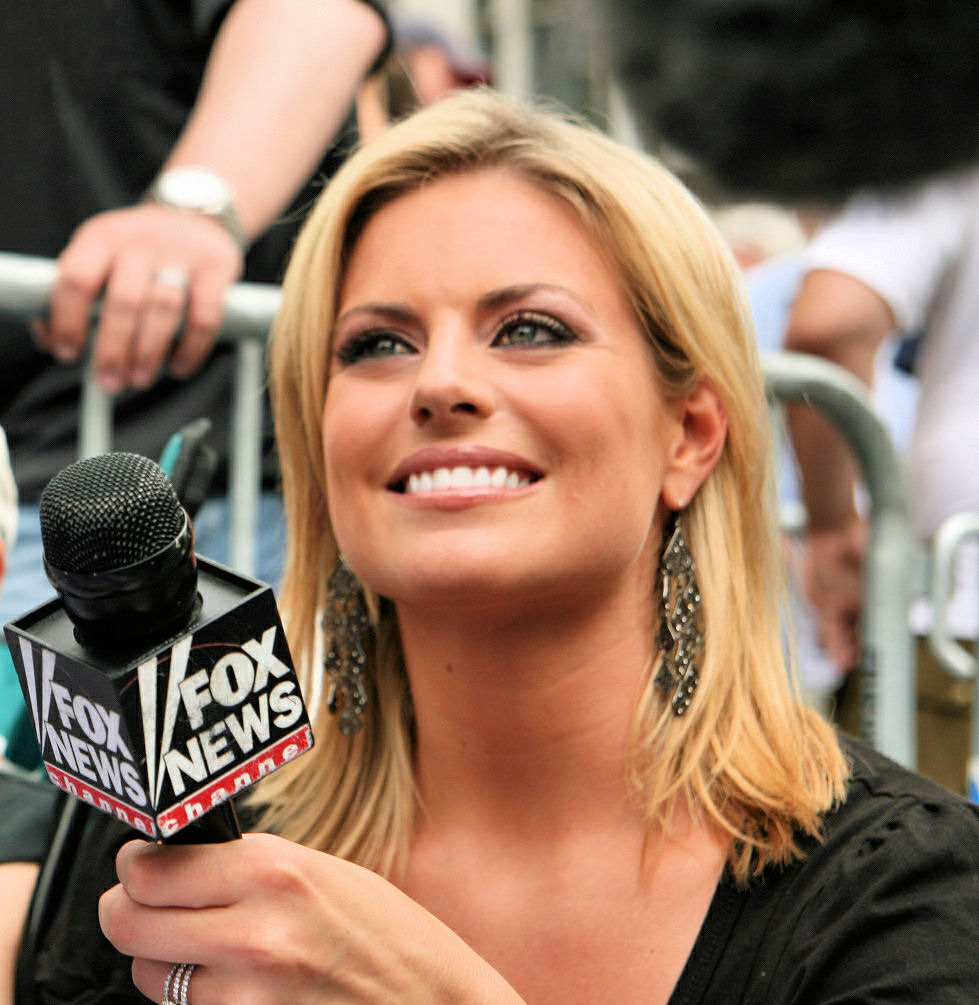
- Friel in June 2007
- Born: April 22, 1980 (age 46); Philadelphia, Pennsylvania, U.S.
- Education: San Diego State University (BA)
- Occupations: News anchor and reporter and author
- Title: Weekend evening news anchor for KTLA (Los Angeles)
- Spouses: Carter Evans (m. 2005; div. 2016); Jim Hecht (m. 2020)
- Children: 2
- Website: courtneyfriel.com

Courtney Friel (born April 22, 1980) is an anchor and reporter on television in the U.S. She currently works for KTLA in Los Angeles.

Friel previously covered entertainment for Fox owned-and-operated station KTTV in Los Angeles, as well as other local stations. Prior to her move to Los Angeles, Friel was the entertainment reporter at Fox News Channel, contributing to a number of entertainment-related programs for the network's website, FoxNews.com. She was a frequent guest contributor on the Fox News late-night satire show Red Eye w/ Greg Gutfeld.

== Early life and education ==
Friel attended Methacton High School in Eagleville, Pennsylvania, where she regularly made the televised morning announcements and was active in the school's media production class. After submitting a short video, she was chosen to appear in Channel One News student-produced week in Los Angeles.

Friel earned a Bachelor of Arts in political science from San Diego State University.

== Career ==
Friel was a sports anchor and entertainment reporter for GoTV Mobile Television, as well as the hostess for the World Poker Tour on the Travel Channel. She hosted GameStop/EBGames "EB TV" which boasted of recently released and upcoming video games. Before that, she co-anchored Court TV's The Saturday Night Solution. She also worked as a field reporter for various networks including E!, Oxygen Channel and Comcast Cable, the World Poker Tour, as well as the syndicated program Extra.

She worked as an anchor at ABC affiliate WBBJ-TV in Jackson, Tennessee in 2003. Friel arrived at WBBJ during the May 2003 tornado outbreak sequence, and covered the devastation in Jackson. She joined Fox News Channel in February 2007. She has appeared in Maxim and FHM. She stated on the November 22, 2011 Red Eye w/ Greg Gutfeld show that she would be moving to Fox News' Los Angeles bureau. She has appeared on TV shows and movies such as Veep, Goliath, and XXX: Return of Xander Cage.

== Personal life ==
Friel was previously married to Carter Evans, a correspondent for CBS News, with whom she has two children. The couple divorced in 2016. She remarried in October 2020 to Jim Hecht. Courtney released an autobiography entitled Tonight at 10: Kicking Booze and Breaking News that details her past drug and alcohol addictions. It was announced in August 2020 that Zero Gravity had obtained the film rights to turn the memoir into a biopic.

== Bibliography ==
- Tonight At 10: Kicking Booze and Breaking News (Launch Pad Publishing, 2020) ISBN 9781951407155
