= Wendy Burch =

American television journalist, advocate and writer

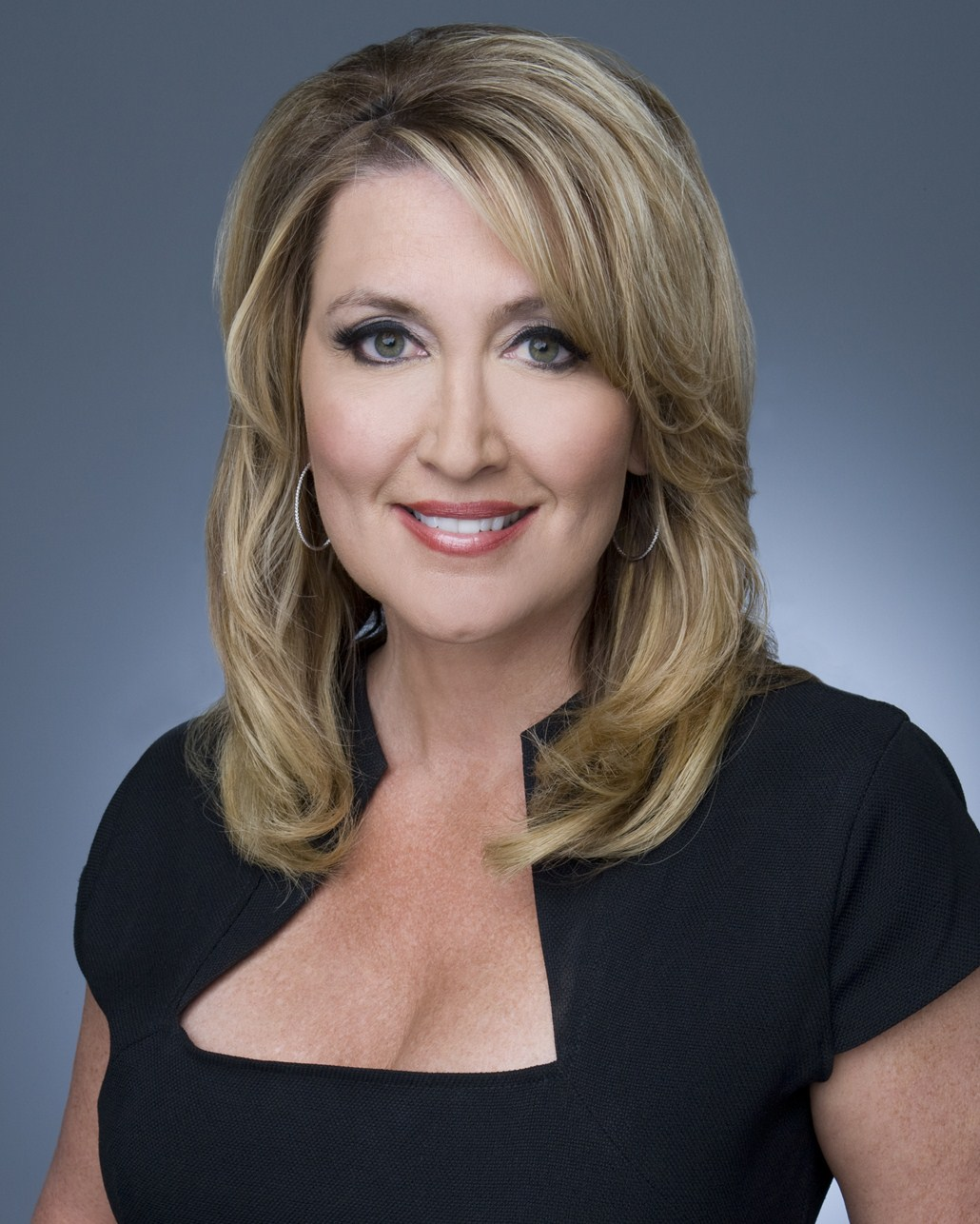
- Burch in 2011
- Born: Wendy Ann Burch; February 5, 1969 (age 57); Salt Lake City, Utah, U.S.
- Education: Brigham Young University
- Occupation: Television Journalist
- Years active: 1990-present
- Spouse: none
- Children: 1

Wendy Ann Burch (born February 5, 1969) is an American television journalist and writer. Burch was a correspondent for the KTLA Morning News in Los Angeles.

== Early life ==
Wendy Burch was born in Salt Lake City, Utah. Five days after her birth, she was given up for adoption by her biological mother and placed with her adoptive parents: James Dean Burch, a purchasing manager for a manufacturing company, and Carol Ann (née Anderson), a homemaker and part-time “lunch lady” at a local school cafeteria. Her adoption process was handled through the Social Services division of the Church of Jesus Christ of Latter-day Saints. Her adoptive family was active in the LDS religion, and Burch was raised under a Mormon upbringing.

Burch attended public schools in Sandy, Utah, including: Alta View Elementary, Eastmont Middle School, and Alta High School. She graduated from Brigham Young University in 1990 with a bachelor's degree in Communications with an emphasis on Broadcast Journalism.

== Career ==
In October 2009, Burch joined KTLA Morning News, where she delivered live reports from breaking news to entertainment reporting and light-hearted features. Because of the live and unpredictable nature of the KTLA Morning News, Burch, on occasion, also became an unintended viral sensation with her reports being viewed millions of times.

== Charitable work & advocacy ==
Burch is the driving force behind FUN-lanthropy, a movement encouraging people to put the ‘fun’ into charity work. In July 2015, she began consulting with various non-profit organizations across the country on ways to improve the ‘fun-factor’ at their charity events. The movement also promotes ways individuals can become philanthropists by organizing fun events on behalf of their favorite charities.

Burch is an outspoken advocate for women struggling with fertility issues. She publicly chronicled her own pregnancy journey after the age of 40, discussing her decision to use a donor egg to ensure a successful pregnancy at the age of 46. Burch is an advocate for egg freezing, and her voice has been instrumental in encouraging other women to seek out fertility treatments and alternatives.

== Personal life ==
Burch gave birth to her son, Brady Taylor Burch, in Santa Monica, California in January 2015.
