= Chris Burrous =

American news anchor (1975–2018)

- Born: Christopher Rocky Burrous; January 11, 1975
- Died: December 27, 2018 (aged 43); Glendale, California, U.S.
- Resting place: Rose Hills Memorial Park
- Education: Chapman University
- Spouse: Mai Hong Do (m. 2003)
- Children: 1

Christopher Rocky Burrous (January 11, 1975 – December 27, 2018) was an American journalist and host of the KTLA 5 Weekend Morning News in Los Angeles. He had a 20-year career in television broadcasting at various news stations before he died at age 43.

== Biography ==
=== Early life and career ===
Burrous was born on January 11, 1975. He was the son of a farmer and NASA engineer. He attended Chapman University in Orange, California, and earned a broadcast journalism degree.

Burrous began his career at KCXX-FM in San Bernardino while still a student at Chapman. From there, he moved to San Jose, where he worked for KMTV and KLIV. Later, he worked at KEVN-LD in Rapid City, South Dakota.

In January 1999, Burrous returned to California, where he was appointed morning news anchor for KGET-TV in Bakersfield. A sister station of KGET, KGPE, which was also owned by the Ackerley Group, hired Burrous in 2001 as co-anchor of its morning show. It was the first major move by Tom Burke, then the station's newly-hired news director, who stated that he chose Burrous for his versatility and enthusiasm. In the early morning hours of February 19, 2002, Burrous injured himself in a car accident that occurred on California State Route 99 north of Tulare. "There was this house cat in the road", he explained to the Fresno Bee, "I couldn't hit it". In order to avoid running it over, Burrous swerved his Acura into a concrete irrigation structure. Although his car was ruined and he had minor injuries as a result, he was gratified that the guardian angel his grandmother had given him was retrieved intact from the wreckage. Burrous returned to KGET in June 2003.

=== Sacramento ===
By late 2005, Burrous moved to Sacramento, where he worked for KMAX-TV. He became anchor for the newly-launched Good Day Sacramento weekend morning show, where he developed a reputation for unscripted banter and commentary. His on-air chemistry with co-anchor Stefanie Cruz was described by the Sacramento Bee as being like the "bickering [of] peevish siblings". Burrous said that they disliked each other intensely during their first year working together. He described the initial period of their professional relationship as "oil-and-water, big sister-little brother", but said it subsequently improved. After Cruz's departure, Burrous co-hosted the show with Taryn Winter-Brill. The revised format of the show, which encouraged live audience interaction online, helped to improve its ratings. According to Burrous:

We tried the let's-get-a-guest-in and be serious show and that didn't work. It was too newsy. Our ratings were down. We're now solely about making connections with viewers. There are very few buffers or filters. It's not far from someone e-mailing from their living room to getting that on the air... It's nerve-wracking to come in with an empty inbox and have to rely on stirring up enough interest to fill the e-mail and voicemail to have a full show.

A minor local controversy occurred on May 7, 2007, when Burrous played excerpts of a parodic song called "Barack, the Magic Negro"; sung to the tune of "Puff, the Magic Dragon", with lyrics based on an editorial by David Ehrenstein that had been published in the Los Angeles Times. The song had been played by Rush Limbaugh on his radio show the week before. Upon playing it, Burrous conducted an online poll to determine whether his viewers believed the song to be racist or not. Limbaugh demanded an apology from Burrous and KMAX.

Another incident occurred on the air in November 2007, when Burrous visited a local homeless encampment in Natomas. After speaking with a homeless woman there, he gave her a bag of food from McDonald's and a case of Bud Light. The latter outraged viewers. One of them told the Sacramento Bee that he had been in disbelief of Burrous' actions, his apparent ignorance of the prevalence of alcoholism among the homeless, and his "record of insensitivity to their plight". KMAX later apologized for Burrous, whose actions they judged as well-intended, but a mistake nonetheless.

Ratings for Good Day Sacramento declined to the degree that they became a source of self-deprecating jokes on-air by Burrous. During a segment on October 7, he pleaded with viewers to watch his show in order to save his job. His show's ratings continued to decline into early 2008.

=== New York City ===
On May 21, 2010, WPIX in New York City announced that it had hired Burrous as co-anchor of their Pix Morning News. His first program in this role aired June 1. Burrous' remarks about the Panama City school board shootings appeared in a New York Daily News article criticizing the reportage of mass shootings and the degradation of journalistic standards.

Burrous announced his departure from WPIX on March 24, 2011. He had asked to be transferred to KTLA in Los Angeles, which was owned by WPIX's parent company, Tribune Media, so as to allow his daughter to live within proximity of her grandparents.

=== Los Angeles ===
Burrous returned to the West Coast in 2011, to join WPIX sister station KTLA. There he helped expand the station's Morning News program as weekend anchor, while also doing reporting on weekdays. He had featured segments at KTLA that included "Burrous Bites", reviews of local restaurants, and "Made in California", reports on area businesses.

== Death ==
On December 27, 2018, Burrous met a male companion at the Days Inn in Glendale for a sexual encounter. The two had met on the Grindr app and had engaged in four prior sexual encounters together. At an undetermined point in their last encounter, Burrous inserted crystal meth into his anus. He later inserted a second rock, put on a bondage mask, then sprayed poppers on its filters. Burrous subsequently vomited and lost consciousness. At 1:15 p.m., his male companion reported a medical emergency to 9-1-1. He performed CPR on Burrous, who was found unconscious by authorities. GHB was also found in the room, but had been only consumed by Burrous' companion. He was transported to Glendale Adventist Medical Center, where he was declared dead at 2:06 p.m.

Co-workers did not learn of Burrous' death until after he missed a scheduled midday meeting. An unidentified woman considered this unusual behavior and contacted staff.

The Los Angeles County Department of Medical Examiner ruled Burrous' death an accident. It determined that he had died from methamphetamine toxicity, with hypertension and atherosclerotic cardiovascular disease cited as contributing factors.

== Personal life ==
In 1999, while working at KGET, Burrous met Mai Hong Do, a fellow journalist. They married in late 2003 and had one daughter.
