= Larry McCormick (TV) =

American journalist

- Born: Lawrence William McCormick; February 3, 1933; Kansas City, Missouri, U.S.
- Died: August 27, 2004 (aged 71); Los Angeles, California, U.S.
- Resting place: Forest Lawn Memorial Park (Hollywood Hills)
- Occupations: Television news reporter, news anchor, actor, voice actor
- Years active: 1964–2004
- Employer: Tribune Broadcasting/KTLA
- Known for: Longtime anchorman for KTLA-TV, Los Angeles

Lawrence William McCormick (February 3, 1933 – August 27, 2004) was an American television actor, reporter and news anchor, most notably working for Los Angeles television station KTLA-TV.

== Biography ==
McCormick was born in Kansas City, Missouri to Pastor L.W. McCormick and Laura McCormick (pianist and vocalist). He began his broadcasting career in the late 1950s as a disc jockey, upon graduating from University of Kansas City. He first came to Los Angeles in 1958, working at then-R&B radio station KGFJ, from 1958-63. He later moved across town to popular Top-40 music outlet KFWB-AM from 1964-1968 before they instituted an all-news format in the spring of 1968.

McCormick became one of the first African-American newscasters in the country, leaving his morning drive slot as disc jockey on radio, KGFJ Los Angeles, where he was also PD, Program Director, from 1968-1969, transitioning to KCOP-TV winter of 1969. Shortly thereafter, he moved across town to KTLA in May 1971, and worked there until his death in 2004.

At KTLA, he served as a features reporter (such as business and health & fitness) on the station's 10 pm weeknight newscasts, while serving as lead anchor on its weekend editions, and co-hosting Making It! Minority Success Stories, a program which profiled successful minority business people.

On August 27, 2004, McCormick died of a cancer-related illness at Cedars-Sinai Medical Center in Los Angeles, at the age of 71.

== Community involvement ==
McCormick was known to be very involved in the Los Angeles community, participating in various charities and events, including hosting local editions of the Jerry Lewis MDA Telethon, back when KTLA carried the telethon locally (the telethon aired on KCAL-TV from 1997 to 2011). Also, for a twelve-year span (1988–2000), he hosted the Los Angeles Unified School District Academic Decathlon, including two national academic decathlons.

== Film, stage and television acting career ==
In addition to being a news reporter, McCormick appeared in numerous films and television series over the years, often playing himself as a reporter, but also portrayed other kinds of characters.

In 1968, he made his stage acting debut as Speed in The Odd Couple at the Ebony Showcase Theater in Los Angeles. The production starred Nick Stewart and Morris Erby and was directed by James Wheaton.

As an actor, McCormick usually appeared in guest spots on TV shows, mostly on TV dramas and sitcoms, such as That Girl; Barnaby Jones; The Jeffersons (in a memorable 1979 episode as Florence's strict and ultra-conservative born-again Christian beau); Murder, She Wrote; Beverly Hills, 90210; and Angel (1999). He also made appearances in such movies as The Punisher (1989) and Terminator 3: Rise of the Machines (2003), which was his final film appearance. McCormick also did voice over work in such Saturday morning cartoon series as The Scooby-Doo/Dynomutt Hour and Dynomutt, Dog Wonder.

== Awards and honors ==
In 1994, McCormick was honored with the Governors Award, a high, prestigious honor given annually by the Academy of Television Arts & Sciences. In June 2001, KTLA honored McCormick by renaming one of its soundstages at Tribune Studios in his name. He was also awarded a star on the Hollywood Walk of Fame for his work in Television.

Larry McCormick Walk of Fame Star

== Filmography ==
Year	Title	Role	Notes
1960	Please Don't Eat the Daisies	Elevator Operator	Uncredited
1967	A Guide for the Married Man	Maitre D'	Uncredited
1969	The Love God?	Rich	
1971	The Love Machine	Reporter	Uncredited
1976	Gus	N.Y. Broadcaster	
1978	Death Drug	Newscaster	
1987	Throw Momma from the Train	Announcer	
1989	The Punisher	TV Newsreader	
1991	The Naked Gun 2½: The Smell of Fear	TV Reporter	
1996	Fly Away Home	TV Anchor	
2001	A Song for Honest Abe	Bill Simmons	Short film
2003	S.W.A.T.	Himself	
2003	Terminator 3: Rise of the Machines	KTLA Anchorman	(final film role)

== Television work (as actor) ==
- Adam-12 (1969) as Wesley
- That Girl (1969) as Reporter
- The Brady Bunch (1969) as TV Announcer
- Assault on the Wayne (1971) as Radio Operator
- McMillan & Wife (1971) as Announcer
- The Doris Day Show (1971-1972) as Jim
- Murdock's Gang (1973) as TV Reporter
- The Dream Makers (1975) as TV Commentator
- The Scooby-Doo/Dynomutt Hour (1976) as Mayor Gaunt (voice)
- The Last Hurrah (1977) as Election announcer
- Dynomutt, Dog Wonder (1978) as Mayor Gaunt (voice)
- The Rockford Files (1978) as Newscaster
- The Jeffersons (1979) as Buzz Thatcher
- Barnaby Jones (3 episodes, 1973–1979) as TV Announcer
- Blind Ambition (1979, TV miniseries) as TV Commentator
- Act of Violence (1979) as Sportscaster
- 240-Robert (1981) as Newscaster
- Between Two Brothers (1982) as Reporter
- Shooting Stars (1983) (TV) as T.V. Newsman
- Murder, She Wrote (1984) as TV Reporter
- Matt Houston (1984) as Newsman
- The Fall Guy (1984)
- Streets of Justice (1985) as TV Reporter #1
- Alfred Hitchcock Presents (1985) as TV Anchorman
- Cagney & Lacey (1985) as Reporter #1
- The Case of the Hillside Stranglers (1989) as Newscaster
- Dear John (1989) as The Reporter
- Mathnet (1990) as Anchorman
- Knots Landing (1989–1990) as Reporter / TV Announcer / Presenter
- Columbo: Columbo Goes to College (1990) as News Anchor
- Midnight Run for Your Life (1994) as Newscaster
- Sliders (1999) as Weatherman
- Beverly Hills, 90210 (1999) as Reporter
- Angel (2003) as Himself
