= KTLA =

Television station in Los Angeles

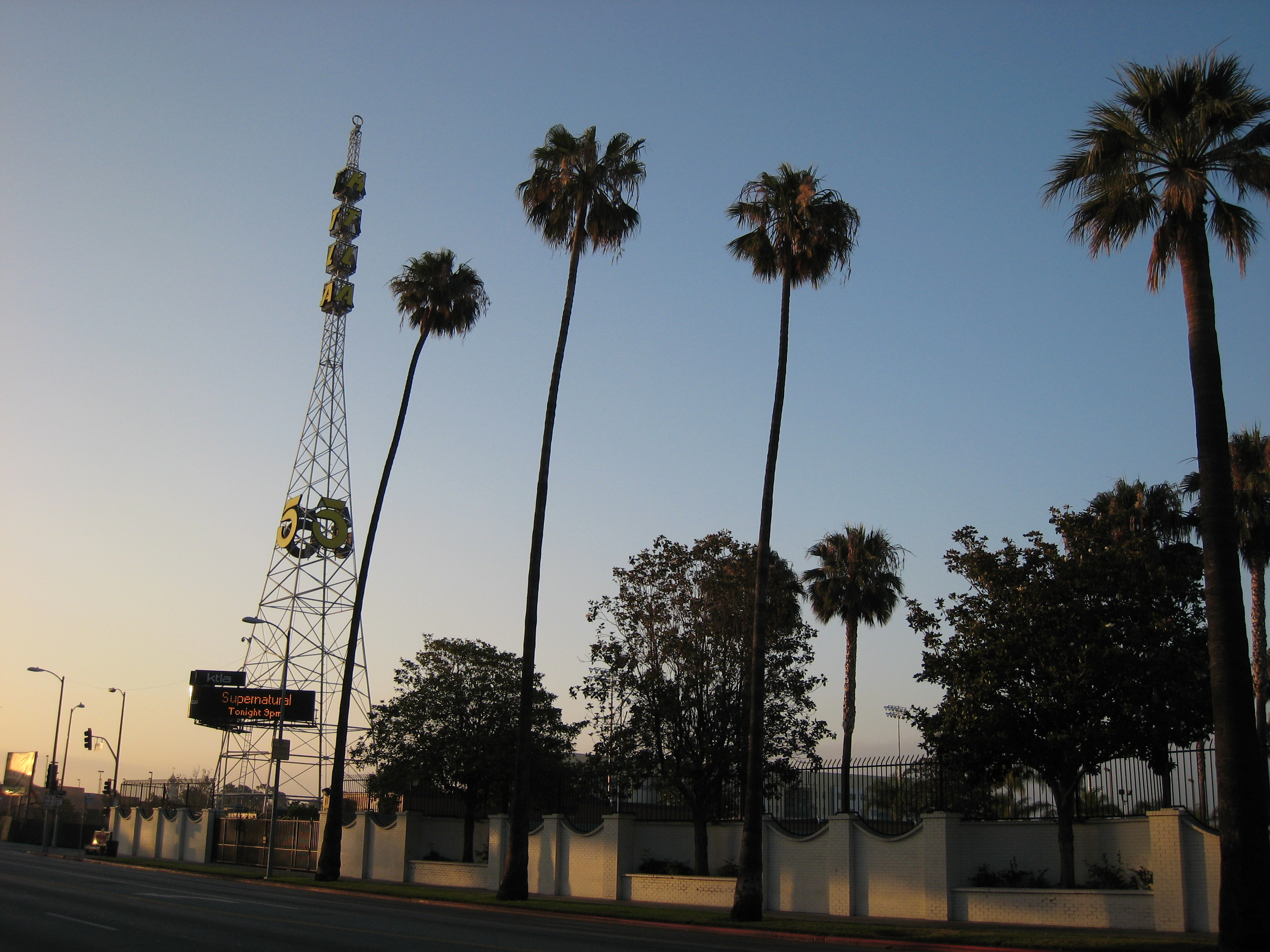
- KTLA tower (left) outside the station's studios on Sunset Boulevard in Hollywood (2007)
- Los Angeles, California; United States
- Channels: Digital: 35 (UHF); Virtual: 5
- Branding: KTLA 5; KTLA 5 News; KTLA 5 CW (during promos for CW programming)

Programming
- Affiliations: 5.1: The CW; for others, see § Subchannels

Ownership
- Owner: Nexstar Media Group; (Tribune Media Company)

History
- Founded: September 1942 (as experimental station W6XYZ)
- First air date: January 22, 1947
- Former channel numbers: Analog: 4 (VHF, 1942–1947), 5 (VHF, 1947–2009); Digital: 31 (UHF, 1998–2019)
- Former affiliations: DuMont (1947–1948); Paramount Television Network (1948–1955); Independent (1955–1995); The WB (1995–2006)
- Call sign meaning: Television Los Angeles

Technical information
- Licensing authority: FCC
- Facility ID: 35670
- ERP: 1,000 kW
- HAAT: 981 m (3,219 ft)
- Transmitter coordinates: 34°13′36″N 118°3′59″W
- Translator(s): see § Translators

Links
- Public license information: Public file; LMS
- Website: ktla.com

KTLA (channel 5) is a television station in Los Angeles, California, United States, serving as the West Coast flagship station of The CW. It is the largest directly owned property of the network's parent company, Nexstar Media Group, and is the second-largest operated property after WPIX in New York City. KTLA's studios are located at the Sunset Bronson Studios on Sunset Boulevard in Hollywood, and its transmitter is located atop Mount Wilson.

KTLA was the first commercially licensed television station in the western United States, having begun operations in January 1947. Although not as widespread in national carriage as its Chicago sister station WGN-TV, KTLA is available as a superstation via DirecTV and Dish Network (the latter service available only to grandfathered subscribers that had purchased its a la carte superstation tier before Dish halted sales of the package to new subscribers in September 2013), as well as on cable providers in select cities within the southwestern United States and throughout Canada.

As of 2015, KTLA operates a streaming-only news radio channel on iHeartRadio.

== History ==
=== Experimental years ===
The station was licensed by the Federal Communications Commission (FCC) in 1939 as experimental station W6XYZ, broadcasting on VHF channel 4; it did not sign on the air until September 1942. The station was originally owned by Paramount Pictures subsidiary Television Productions, Inc., and was based at the Paramount Studios lot. Klaus Landsberg, already an accomplished television pioneer at the age of 26, was the original station manager and engineer.

=== Early years as a commercially licensed station ===
On January 22, 1947, the station was licensed for commercial broadcasting as KTLA on channel 5, becoming the first commercial television station in California, the first in the city of Los Angeles, the first to broadcast west of the Mississippi River, and the eighth commercial television station in the United States. Estimates of television sets in Los Angeles County at the time ranged from 350 to 600, since experimental station W6XAO (later KTSL and KNXT, now KCBS-TV) was already in operation broadcasting with a regular schedule. Bob Hope served as the emcee for KTLA's inaugural broadcast, titled as The Western Premiere of Commercial Television, which was broadcast live that evening from a garage on the Paramount Studios lot and featured appearances from many Hollywood luminaries. Hope delivered what was perhaps the most famous line of the telecast when, at the program's start, he identified the new station as "KTL" – mistakenly omitting the "A" at the end of the call sign. A 10-minute fragment from KTLA's first broadcast exists at the Paley Center for Media.

KTLA was originally affiliated with the DuMont Television Network, of which Paramount held a minority stake; it disaffiliated from the network in 1948 and converted into an independent station. Despite this, the FCC still considered Paramount as controlling manager of DuMont due to the strength of the company's voting stock and their influence in managing the network. As a result, the agency did not allow DuMont to buy additional VHF stations—a problem that would later play a large role in the failure of DuMont, whose programming was splintered among other Los Angeles stations—including KTSL, KHJ-TV (channel 9, now KCAL-TV), KTTV (channel 11), and KCOP-TV (channel 13)—until the network's demise in 1956. Paramount even launched a short-lived programming service, the Paramount Television Network, in 1948, with KTLA and WBKB-TV (now WBBM-TV) in Chicago serving as its flagship stations. The service never gelled into a true television network, but during KTLA's early years, the station produced over a dozen series that were syndicated in much of the U.S., including Armchair Detective, Bandstand Revue, Dixie Showboat, Frosty Frolics, Hollywood Reel, Hollywood Wrestling, Latin Cruise, Movietown, RSVP, Olympic Wrestling, Sandy Dreams, and Time for Beany.

In 1958, KTLA moved its operations into the Paramount Sunset Studios on Sunset Boulevard in Hollywood. For many years, those who have worked on Stage 6 at KTLA were told that it was the site where Al Jolson's landmark film The Jazz Singer was shot in 1927, when the lot was known as the Warner Bros. Sunset Studios; Mark Evanier, who wrote for one such show in 1978, points out on his website that Stage 6 did not even exist at the time that The Jazz Singer was produced and that it was actually probably filmed at what is now Stage 9. The former Warner Bros./Paramount lot is now known as Sunset Bronson Studios, where KTLA's facility remains based to this day, and where shows such as WKRP in Cincinnati, Judge Judy, Hannah Montana, The Gong Show, Solid Gold, Name That Tune, Family Feud, The Newlywed Game, MADtv and Let's Make a Deal have been produced over the years. KTLA is currently the only Los Angeles area broadcaster that remains based in Hollywood as many other television and radio stations have moved to other parts of the region.

KTLA has the distinction as being the first news station to use a helicopter as a news broadcasting platform. KTLA engineer John D. Silva pioneered the use of a Bell 47G-2 outfitted with transmitters to relay live breaking news back to the KTLA transmitter receiver on Mount Wilson to scoop their competitors, making their first successful in-flight broadcast on July 4, 1958.

=== Golden West Broadcasters ownership ===
In November 1963, KTLA was purchased by actor and singer Gene Autry for $12 million; upon the sale's finalization in May 1964, Autry merged the station with his other broadcasting properties, including KMPC radio (710 AM, now KSPN) into an umbrella company known as Golden West Broadcasters. During the 1970s, KTLA was uplinked to satellite and became one of the nation's first superstations; the station was eventually carried on cable providers across much of the United States located west of the Mississippi River.

KTLA sought a different programming strategy from its competitors during the late 1960s and 1970s, emphasizing syndicated reruns of off-network hour long dramas with a heavy emphasis on western-themed programs such as The Gene Autry Show, Bonanza, The Big Valley, first-run talk shows, movies, and sports programming. Children's programs, with the exception of weekend morning Popeye cartoons (which originally came from former parent Paramount, but had been sold off to what became the syndication arm of United Artists Television), were also phased out. Popeye continued Sunday mornings but with only the 1960s King Features episodes. Later in the 1970s, more drama shows like Kung Fu, Wonder Woman and Starsky & Hutch were added. In 1979, KTLA acquired much of the programming inventory of struggling independent competitor KBSC-TV (channel 52, now Telemundo owned-and-operated station KVEA) including The Little Rascals, The Three Stooges, The Munsters, The Addams Family, Gilligan's Island, and Leave It to Beaver, among others. These shows ran weekend mornings and weekend early afternoons. In 1979, KTLA acquired Happy Days, in 1981 Laverne & Shirley, Little House on the Prairie, in 1982 Taxi, and CHiPs, among other shows. The station continued to emphasize hour-long dramas during the day on weekdays, but began to run recent sitcoms in the evenings.

=== Tribune Broadcasting ownership ===
In November 1982, Golden West sold KTLA to investment firm Kohlberg Kravis Roberts (KKR) for $245 million. In May 1985, KKR sold the station to Chicago-based Tribune Broadcasting, for a then-record price of $510 million, which beat the station's earlier record sale price set by the 1982 acquisition by KKR. Under Tribune, KTLA continued to acquire high rated off-network sitcoms as well as talk shows for its schedule.

KTLA became an affiliate of the MGM/UA Premiere Network, a film-based ad hoc television network, with the showing of Clash of the Titans. The station added the syndicated Action Pack programming block to its schedule starting in mid-January 1994.

KTLA spent much of the early and mid-1980s battling KTTV (channel 11) for the spot of the top-rated independent station in Southern California, offering a variety of general entertainment programs including movies, sports and off-network reruns; it took the top spot among the market's independents full-time after KTTV became a Fox charter station upon that network's start-up in October 1986. The station stayed out of the kids' business throughout the 1980s, unlike other Tribune stations but acquired stronger programming like Charles in Charge, Full House, Cheers, Punky Brewster, and Silver Spoons. The station also mixed in a few classic sitcoms weekday early mornings as well as on weekends. In the summer of 1991, the station debuted a two-hour weekday morning newscast. Sitcoms ran on the station 9 a.m. to noon weekdays.

=== WB affiliation ===
KTLA logos under WB affiliation

1995–1997

1997–2005

2005–2006

On November 2, 1993, the Warner Bros. Television division of Time Warner and the Tribune Company announced the formation of The WB Television Network. Due to the company's ownership interest in the network (initially a 12.5% stake, later expanding to 22%), Tribune signed its seven existing independent stations (one such station, Atlanta's WGNX, joined CBS instead one month prior to The WB's launch), along with an eighth that the company had acquired the following year, to serve as The WB's charter affiliates. With this, KTLA became a network affiliate for the first time in 47 years when The WB launched on January 11, 1995.

Like with other WB-affiliated stations during the network's first four years, KTLA initially continued to essentially program as a de facto independent station as The WB had broadcast only a two-hour prime time schedule on Wednesday nights at the network's launch; the station continued to broadcast films in prime time along with some first-run syndicated scripted series on nights when network programs did not air. The WB would eventually carry prime time shows six nights a week (Sunday through Friday) by September 1999. In September 1995, KTLA added afternoon cartoons and Saturday morning cartoons from the network's newly launched Kids' WB block, bringing weekday children's programs back to channel 5 for the first time in close to 25 years. The station continued use the "Channel 5" brand it used prior to its WB affiliation (with The WB logo simply tacked onto the station's "Gold 5" logo) until 1997, when the station overhauled its on-air branding to "KTLA 5, L.A.'s WB".

The Tribune Company purchased the Times Mirror Company (then-owners of the Los Angeles Times) in 2000, bringing the newspaper into common ownership with channel 5; ironically, the Los Angeles Times was the original owner of Fox owned-and-operated station KTTV from 1949 (under a joint venture with CBS through 1951) until it sold the station to Metromedia (successor to DuMont's owned and operated stations) in 1963 (that company would eventually become Fox Television Stations upon Metromedia's 1986 merger with News Corporation); as FCC rules prohibited the common ownership of newspapers and broadcast outlets in the same market, Tribune filed for and was granted a waiver by the agency to acquire the Times. The Times and KTLA were separated on August 4, 2014, when Tribune spun off its publishing division into a separate company; KTLA and Tribune's other broadcasting properties (as well as its Media Services and real estate units) remained with the original company, which was renamed as the Tribune Media Company.

KTLA unveiled a new branding campaign on January 1, 2005, that omitted all references to its over-the-air channel 5 position (although the references returned after the station became a CW affiliate one year later). The new look included a modernized logo with a halo emblem over the KTLA calls and WB logo, and a change in branding to KTLA, The WB.

=== CW affiliation ===
On January 24, 2006, the Warner Bros. unit of Time Warner (now Warner Bros. Discovery) and CBS Corporation (now Paramount Global) announced that the two companies would shut down The WB and UPN and combine the networks' respective programming to create a new "fifth" network called The CW. With the announcement, Tribune Broadcasting signed ten-year agreements for KTLA and 16 of the company's 18 other WB-affiliated stations (three of which it would sell to other groups shortly before The CW launched including WLVI, WATL, and WCWN) to become charter affiliates of The CW. The station changed its branding to "KTLA 5, The CW" on September 17, 2006, immediately after the airing of The WB's final broadcast, The Night of Favorites and Farewells.

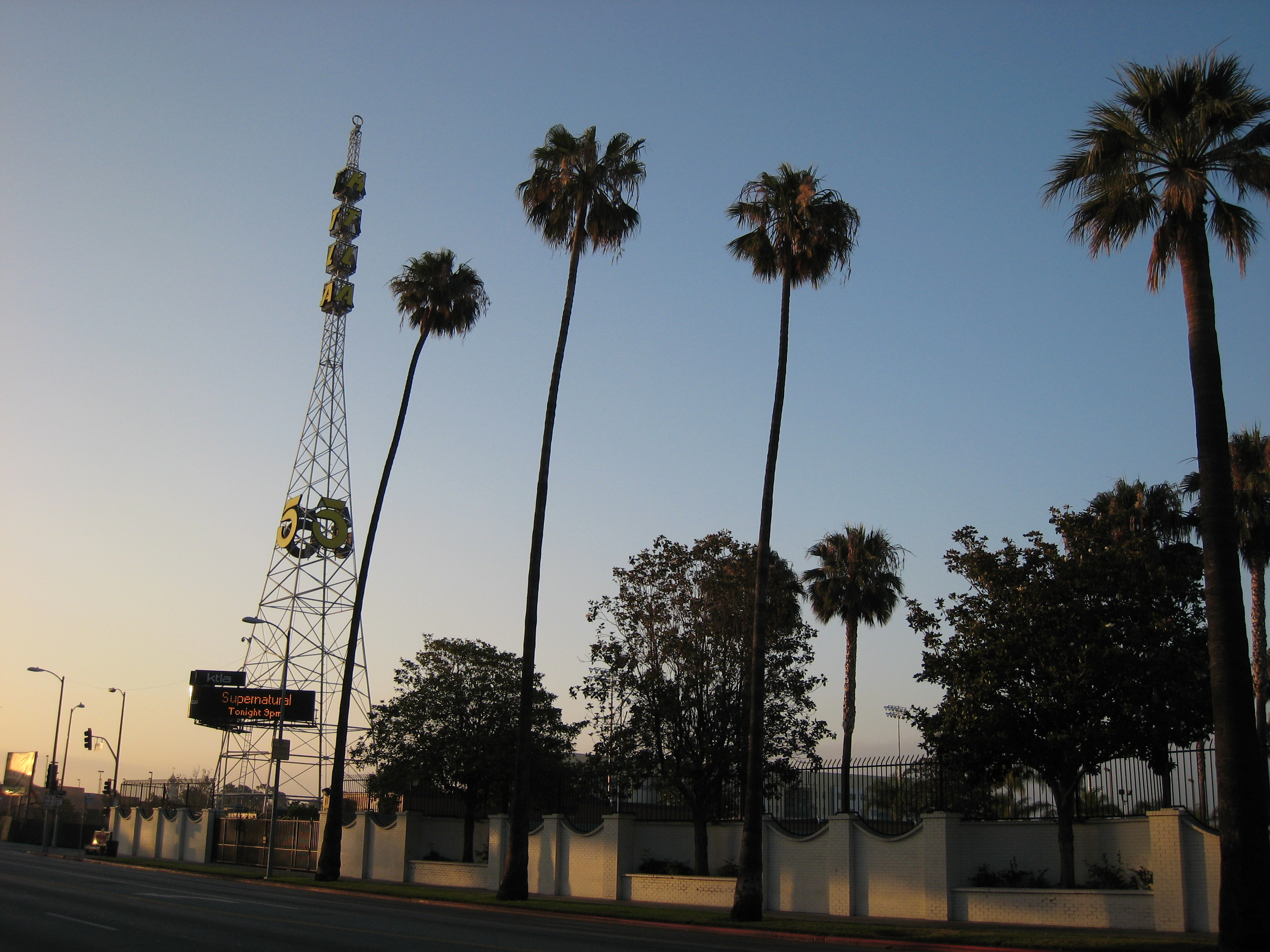
KTLA tower on Sunset Boulevard in 2007. The tower was erected in 1925, and was one of two radio towers that served Warner Bros.-owned radio station, KFWB, from the Warner Brothers Studio (now Sunset Bronson Studios) in Hollywood; the second tower was permanently removed in 1950. KTLA moved to the property in 1955, and added its call letters to the structure, which was moved to another spot on the property; the tower was relocated back to its original site in 2015. The station does not actually broadcast from this tower, with its main transmitter being positioned atop Mount Wilson.

On January 22, 2007, KTLA celebrated its 60th anniversary of continuous broadcasting. Two days later, on January 24, 2007, KTLA became the first television entity to be honored with a star on the Hollywood Walk of Fame. In addition to the station itself, six other individuals associated with KTLA—former owner Gene Autry, newsmen Hal Fishman, George Putnam, Stan Chambers and Larry McCormick, and founding manager Klaus Landsberg—have received stars on the Walk of Fame. In addition, KTLA continued its celebration on the weekend after Thanksgiving with a 60-hour marathon of classic shows that aired on KTLA in the past such as The Honeymooners, The Jack Benny Program, The Little Rascals, Wonder Woman and Peter Gunn. KTLA also aired retrospectives of historic Los Angeles news stories during its weekend evening newscasts, but was not aired on November 24 due to coverage of the Corral Canyon fire in Malibu.

On February 14, 2008, the Tribune Company sold Tribune Studios and related real estate in Los Angeles to equity firm Hudson Capital LLC for $125 million, with the studio lot being renamed Sunset Bronson Studios following the sale. There had been speculation that KTLA would move into the Los Angeles Times Building in downtown Los Angeles, combining operations and staff with the Times newspaper; this arrangement is also used by two other Tribune combined newspaper-broadcast operations: Miami's WSFL-TV is based in the offices of former sister newspaper Sun-Sentinel, while the Hartford duopoly of WTIC-TV/WTXX moved into new facilities in the Hartford Courant building in December 2009.

On October 14, 2009, KTLA unveiled a new logo and a redesigned news set, bringing back the classic stylized number "5" that was previously used by the station from 1981 to 1997, and eliminating The CW's logo from regular usage (though it is still used in promotions for the network's programs). The "LA" in the KTLA callsign is rendered in bold lettering to emphasize the station's Los Angeles location and coverage area, similar to a previous wordmark logo used from 1997 to 2005.

==== Aborted sale to Sinclair and sale to Nexstar ====
Sinclair Broadcast Group entered into an agreement to acquire Tribune Media on May 8, 2017, for $3.9 billion, plus the assumption of $2.7 billion in Tribune debt. The prospect of Sinclair acquiring KTLA was met with consternation among station employees, due to concerns over the influence the company might have on the station's news content. Sinclair has been known for requiring its stations to run news reports and commentaries that reflect a conservative perspective; the city of Los Angeles and some adjacent and outlying suburbs are predominately liberal, while some outlying areas elsewhere in the market (including portions of Orange County) lean conservative. The deal received significant scrutiny over Sinclair's forthrightness in its applications to sell certain conflict properties, prompting the FCC to designate it for hearing and leading Tribune to terminate the deal and sue Sinclair for breach of contract.

Following the Sinclair deal's collapse, Nexstar Media Group of Irving, Texas, announced its purchase of Tribune Media on December 3, 2018, for $6.4 billion in cash and debt. The sale was completed on September 19, 2019.

Nexstar renewed their affiliation deal with The CW on May 20, 2021, which covered the company's then-37 CW-affiliated stations in many media markets, including KTLA.

== Programming ==
KTLA clears the entire CW schedule, although since the expansion of its Saturday morning newscast in May 2014, it has aired the network's children's block—currently known as One Magnificent Morning—three hours later (from 10 a.m. to 3 pm) than the network's other Pacific Time Zone affiliates until September 30, 2017. From October 7 to December 30, 2017, the station aired the OMM block locally on a two-hour delayed basis from 10 a.m. to 1 pm. On January 6, 2018, the station began airing the OMM block again on a three-hour delayed basis, this time from 11 a.m. to 2 pm, due to the expansion of its weekend morning newscast to five hours. Until the network returned the weekday hour of programming to its affiliates in September 2021, the station also aired The CW Daytime reruns of the syndicated talk show The Jerry Springer Show at 2 p.m.—one hour earlier than the network's recommended timeslot at 3 p.m.—due to its 3 p.m. newscast (a scheduling inherited from The Bill Cunningham Show after KTLA displaced the program from its network-dictated timeslot following the launch of its mid-afternoon newscast in December 2014 and, most recently, The Robert Irvine Show).

Throughout the film and television awards seasons, as KTLA is unassociated with an entity owning a film or television studio or streaming service, those entities will often purchase the hours before prime time on KTLA to present "for your consideration" programs regarding their series or films, often behind-the-scenes looks and interviews with acting nominees for the interest of awards voters. The station is also a part of Nexstar's statewide network when KTLA or another California Nexstar station originates a political debate for statewide office.

KTLA has also broadcast the annual Tournament of Roses Parade from Pasadena each New Year's Day since 1948; while other local stations have also broadcast the parade over the years, KTLA remains the sole English-language outlet in the Los Angeles market to continuously broadcast the event. The station also served as host broadcaster of the Hollywood Christmas Parade, which was later syndicated to all Tribune-owned stations and the Hallmark Channel, a role it resumed in 2015 when The CW received the national broadcast rights. KTLA also broadcasts the San Diego Big Bay Boom July 4 fireworks show, with coverage produced by sister station KSWB-TV.

=== Sports programming ===
KTLA serves as the over-the-air home of the Los Angeles Clippers, broadcasting 15 preseason and regular season games starting in the 2022–23 season. The station had earlier carried the team from 1985 to 1991 and from 2002 to 2009.

From 1964 to 1995, KTLA served as the broadcast television home of the Los Angeles/California Angels baseball team, after then-Angels owner Gene Autry purchased the station through Golden West Broadcasters. The television rights to Angels games moved to KCAL-TV in 1996 (which KTLA had previously assumed broadcast rights from, and whose then-owner The Walt Disney Company's ownership interest in the Angels briefly overlapped with KCAL's contract with the team).

KTLA served as the local over-the-air television broadcaster rights to Los Angeles Dodgers baseball games from 1993 to 2001. The station would return to its over-the-air relationship with the Dodgers on September 2, 2016, when KTLA entered into an agreement with Charter Communications (which had acquired Time Warner Cable's Southern California systems earlier that year through its acquisition of the latter cable provider) to simulcast six regular season games scheduled for the final two weeks of the 2016 season to which regional sports network SportsNet LA already held rights to broadcast through its contract with the Dodgers. This arrangement would extend into the following year, when on March 8, 2017, SportsNet LA agreed to simulcast ten Dodgers games scheduled during the first and last five weeks of the 2017 regular season on KTLA. The original decision for the simulcasting arrangement was made after complaints were raised that fans would not be able to watch the final broadcasts of retiring legendary commentator Vin Scully, since SportsNet LA's availability in Southern California is primarily limited to Charter Spectrum systems because of disagreements between Charter/TWC and five major television providers serving the region (Cox Communications, Frontier FiOS, AT&T U-verse, DirecTV and Dish Network) over transmission rates that have prevented them from agreeing to carry the channel. Channel 5 would continue this arrangement with SportsNet LA since the 2018 season.

KTLA also carried selected Los Angeles Lakers road games from 1967 to 1977, and as well as selected Los Angeles Kings road games during that same time period (and again selected telecasts during the majority of the Wayne Gretzky era in the late 1980s to mid 1990s). Other than telecasts of preseason games from the Las Vegas Raiders (who were based in Los Angeles from 1982 until the team returned to Oakland in 1994) syndicated by the Las Vegas Silver and Black Network, along with a 30-minute show each weekend during the regular season before the game, KTLA does produce one sporting event each year, the LA Marathon, which features many of the Morning News on-air staff, along with running specialists on a Sunday morning in February/March of each year.

=== News operation ===
KTLA's KTLA 5 News logo, in use since 2016.

KTLA presently broadcasts 105 hours, 55 minutes of locally produced newscasts each week (with 17 hours, 35 minutes each weekday and nine hours each on Saturdays and Sundays); in regards to the number of hours devoted to news programming, it is the highest newscast output among television stations in California and in the United States as a whole. KTLA produces a 15-minute sports wrap-up show every night at 10:45 pm, during KTLA 5 News at 10:00; produces a 30-minute show, KTLA 5 Sports Final, on the weekends at 11:35 p.m. after KTLA 5 News at 11:00.

KTLA's news department is located inside the former Warner Bros. Cartoons studio (known as the Hal Fishman Newsroom since 2000) at the corner of Van Ness and Fernwood in Hollywood. Although KTLA does not cover police pursuits as much as other stations, it has put more emphasis in local crime stories, as opposed to politics, health and other serious news. KTLA had created synergy between Tribune Company entities. For example, entertainment reporter Sam Rubin would often be featured in addition to his KTLA work as the main Los Angeles-based entertainment reporter for Chicago sister station WGN-TV. Los Angeles Times columnist David Lazarus also reported on consumer stories from the paper's headquarters in El Segundo, before switching full time to KTLA in 2022.

For many years, Channel 5's news department, which has existed since its sign-on, was considered the benchmark of Los Angeles television. In 1958, KTLA began operating a well-equipped helicopter for newsgathering known as the "Telecopter", and was the most advanced airborne television broadcast device of its time; it was ultimately sold to NBC-owned KNBC (channel 4), which flew the Telecopter with pilot Francis Gary Powers and cameraman George Spears until it crashed on August 1, 1977, killing the two on board.

During the early 1960s, under the final years of ownership under Paramount Pictures, KTLA launched am:LA, a one-hour morning news program anchored by Stan Chambers, and with it, it was the first extended morning newscast in Southern California. Before eventually launching a 10 p.m. newscast in 1965, originally titled Newscene (also known over the years as The George Putnam News, NewsWatch, Channel 5/KTLA News at Ten and KTLA Prime News), KTLA had its weeknight evening newscasts airing at 7 and 11 pm, with the latter in direct competition with the network-owned local newscasts on KNXT (now KCBS-TV), KRCA-TV (now KNBC) and KABC-TV. Traditionally, the evening news programs are often serious and no-nonsense in nature and has received many journalism awards. Putnam and fellow KTLA news anchors Hal Fishman and Larry McCormick became icons in Los Angeles television news over the years. Accompanying his news anchoring career, McCormick also hosted Making It!, a public affairs program on the station which featured stories on the entrepreneurial successes of ethnic minorities. Its veteran field reporters have included 62-year KTLA veteran Stan Chambers and Warren Wilson. Stu Nahan, Keith Olbermann and Ed Arnold (former anchor of KOCE-TV's Real Orange) formerly served as sports anchors.

In March 1991, KTLA was the first station to air the infamous video of Rodney King's beating by three Los Angeles police officers, whose eventual acquittal sparked rioting within the city in 1992. In July 1991, KTLA debuted the Los Angeles market's first live, local morning two-hour newscast, the KTLA Morning News, to compete with the network morning shows on KABC-TV (channel 7), KCBS-TV (channel 2) and KNBC (which each started at 7 am, as KTLA's program initially did). The program suffered from low ratings at first; however, the ability to cover breaking news live (as opposed to the network morning programs, which were aired on a three-hour tape delay) attracted more viewers to the program. As time went on, the Morning News has enjoyed great ratings success, generally ranking number one in its main 7–9 a.m. time period. The program's success spawned rival KTTV to launch its own morning newscast, Good Day L.A., in 1993. From 1994 to 1995, the station aired gavel to gavel coverage of the O. J. Simpson trial anchored by Marta Waller (this coverage was rebroadcast by other stations such as Portland, Oregon WB affiliate [and future Tribune sister station] KWBP (now KRCW-TV)).

The station debuted a midday newscast at noon in 1995, which later moved to 11 a.m. the following year, which lasted less than two years before it was canceled in 1997. In recent years, KTLA's newscasts have become more tabloid-based in nature, perhaps to compete with KTTV (both stations have rivaled each other in the ratings for many years). With this, KTLA has placed more emphasis on entertainment news and has featured personalities such as Mindy Burbano Stearns, Zorianna Kitt, Ross King and most recently Jessica Holmes as entertainment reporters. In 2004, KTLA debuted a segment on its morning newscast titled "The Audition", in which several actors and actresses competed for a role as weathercaster on its 10 p.m. newscast. King won the first installment, followed by Holmes as the winner of the second installment (Holmes now serves as co-anchor of the 7–11 a.m. weekday block of the KTLA Morning News).

On January 13, 2007, KTLA became the second television station in the Los Angeles market (after KABC-TV) to begin broadcasting its local newscasts in high definition. On July 30, 2007, Hal Fishman anchored what would be his final newscast for KTLA. Following several days of hospitalization for a liver infection, Fishman died on August 7, 2007. KTLA's newscasts that day were dedicated to Fishman, for whom the station dedicated its news studio in 2000. After Fishman's passing, longtime Morning Show co-host Carlos Amezcua became the interim co-anchor on the 10 p.m. newscast. Local media speculated that Amezcua would be named full-time anchor of the prime time newscast; however, on September 4, Amezcua announced his departure from KTLA to replace John Beard as co-anchor of KTTV's 10 p.m. newscast. Morning co-anchor Emmett Miller took over as interim evening anchor and was named as Fishman's permanent replacement on December 4.

After former KCBS/KCAL general manager Don Corsini was appointed as KTLA's president and general manager in January 2009, the station spearheaded an expansion of its news programming that year. On January 19, KTLA soft-launched a nightly half-hour 6:30 p.m. newscast (the market's first since KCAL-TV and KCBS-TV ran newscasts in that slot – KCBS's being part of an hour-long 6 p.m. newscast – during the mid-1990s, prior to CBS's 2002 purchase of KCAL). Then on April 1, 2009, the KTLA Morning News was expanded by a half-hour to start at 4:30 a.m. and an hour-long midday newscast at 1 p.m. debuted. On April 4, the weekend edition of the 6:30 p.m. newscast expanded to a full hour at 6 pm, with the 6:30 p.m. weekday newscasts following suit that September. Shortly afterward, KTLA expanded the station's traffic reports to the afternoon and evening newscasts (the weekday edition of the Morning News uses a dedicated traffic anchor, while traffic reports for all other newscasts are done by channel 5's on-air weather staff).

In April 2011, KTLA added weekend morning newscasts (an hour-long newscast at 6 a.m. on Saturdays, which expanded to two hours at 5 a.m. in September 2012 and a three-hour Sunday newscast at 6 am; the Saturday morning edition aired in the earlier timeslot due to The CW's Vortexx animation block). In August 2011, KTLA added a two-hour prime time newscast titled the KTLA 5 Sunday Edition from 8 to 10 p.m. on Sunday evenings, leading into that night's 10 p.m. newscast (the 8 p.m. hour of the program was later dropped in September 2013, while the 9 p.m. hour moved to 7 p.m. on October 7, 2018, to accommodate the return of The CW's Sunday night two-hour prime time block). On February 2, 2012, KTLA expanded the weekday edition of the KTLA Morning News to begin at 4 a.m.

On May 9, 2014, the Saturday morning newscast was expanded to three hours and moved to 6–9 a.m., in a uniform timeslot as the Sunday morning newscast, causing The CW's children's program block at the time, Vortexx, to be aired to a two-hour tape delay (that broadcast expanded to four hours from 6 to 10 a.m. on August 6, 2016, further aligning it with the prior expansion of the Sunday morning newscast into the same four-hour slot on July 5, 2015, and pushing the successor One Magnificent Morning block back by an additional hour). The following month on June 16, KTLA quietly "soft launched" a half-hour nightly newscast at 11 p.m. without any promotion (becoming Tribune's first news-producing CW affiliate to carry a newscast in the traditional late news timeslot), its first regularly scheduled 11 pm newscast since 1965.

On December 26, 2014, KTLA added separate hour-long, weekday afternoon newscasts at 2 and 3 pm. The creation of the three-hour mid-afternoon news block—which expanded upon the existing 1 p.m. newscast—was in response to CBS Television Stations' December 10 announcement that it would discontinue KCAL-TV's newscasts at 2 and 3 p.m. late that month to refocus newsgathering resources towards KCAL's 4 p.m. newscast and the respective evening newscasts on KCAL and sister station KCBS-TV. While the 3 p.m. broadcast was a permanent addition, the 2 p.m. newscast was intended as a temporary fill-in that ran until December 31, 2014 (it was replaced two days later on January 2, 2015, by a double-run of Celebrity Name Game). In July 2015, KTLA became the first television station in Los Angeles to carry live audio simulcasts of its newscasts on the iHeartRadio app.

On June 12, 2017, KTLA expanded the weekday edition of the KTLA 5 Morning News to 11 am.

On January 6, 2018, KTLA expanded the weekend edition of the KTLA 5 Morning News to 11 am.

On May 1, 2018, KTLA debuted an hour long newscast at 11 am.

On October 7, 2018, KTLA moved its Sunday Edition up two hours earlier to 7 p.m. due to The CW adding prime time programming on Sundays until October 1, 2023. KTLA moved its Sunday newscast to 4 p.m. due to The CW adding 7 p.m. primetime programming on October 8, 2023.

On December 27, 2018, KTLA Weekend News anchor and reporter, Chris Burrous, was found unconscious from a methamphetamine overdose in a Days Inn hotel room in Glendale, California. He was pronounced dead at a nearby hospital.

On January 12, 2019, KTLA began producing a weekend 30-minute edition of KTLA 5 Sports Final at 11:35 pm after the 11 p.m. newscast.

On February 9, 2019, KTLA added a new hour-long 5 p.m. weekend newscast.

On September 21, 2020, KTLA added a new hour-long 12 p.m. weekday newscast. The newscast had started months earlier due to the COVID-19 pandemic and became permanent on that day. Also on that day, the lifestyle show LA Unscripted debuted.

On May 3, 2021, KTLA launched Off the Clock, a program featuring the Morning News team in a more relaxed environment, on streaming. Subsequently, with the ending of Maury, Off the Clock was brought to broadcast airing at 2 p.m.

On October 4, 2021, KTLA added a new hour-long 5 p.m. weekday newscast.

On February 20, 2023, KTLA added a new hour-long 4 p.m. weekday newscast.

On September 16, 2024, KTLA added a new half-hour long 7 p.m. weeknight newscast. Including LA Unscripted, KTLA runs continuous news and information programming from 4 a.m. to 8 p.m. on weekdays.

==== Controversies ====
- In 1978, Arnold Shapiro's documentary Scared Straight! was broadcast on the station without edits for the film's profanity, narrated by Peter Falk as a controversial deterrent to juvenile delinquency.
- In 2004, People and Hollywood Reporter entertainment writer Zorianna Kit was hired as an on-air reporter despite having no television news experience (Kit had previously served as a panelist on the short-lived television series Movie Club with John Ridley). Kit raised ethical questions in January 2005 when she made an on-air criticism of Brad Grey's appointment as the head of Paramount Pictures, without disclosing that her husband, producer Bo Zenga, had sued Grey over profits from the film Scary Movie. The issue was reported in the Los Angeles Times and in mid-January, Kit apologized on-air; she left KTLA in July 2005.
- In January 2006, KTLA management came under fire for replacing Stephanie Edwards, who emceed the Tournament of Roses Parade for nearly three decades, with Bob Eubanks, as co-host of the station's annual broadcast of the parade. Edwards was moved out of the booth and became a street reporter, being replaced in the booth by Michaela Pereira (who would be in the booth for the 2007 and 2008 parade). The move was widely seen as insensitive and created a storm of controversy, including a scathing Times column by Patt Morrison. This situation was made worse because it was raining that day, and Edwards was forced to stay outside near the parade route. However, in September 2008 (after three years without Edwards in the booth), KTLA management announced that Edwards would resume co-hosting duties with Eubanks for the parade's 2009 telecast (in which they both would continue hosting the parade until they retired after the 2016 parade).
- In February 2006, the Pasadena Star-News reported that anchors Carlos Amezcua and Michaela Pereira, and entertainment reporter Sam Rubin, had accepted free rooms at the recently renovated Ritz-Carlton Huntington Hotel and Spa in Pasadena. The station telecast an entire Morning News episode from Pasadena, although the hotel was not specifically mentioned. Still, it was widely seen as a significant ethical lapse, one that violated Tribune Company guidelines.
- On March 4, 2006, the Times reported that Michaela Pereira had accepted $10,000 worth of furniture for her Pasadena home. The furnishings, delivered in September 2005, were to be part of an unaired "Extreme Home Makeover" segment on the Morning News. The furniture company was never paid, stating that it was under the impression that the work was in exchange for favorable coverage.
- In June 2009, the Los Angeles Times reported that anchor Lu Parker began a relationship with Los Angeles mayor Antonio Villaraigosa in March of that year. KTLA management was reportedly unaware of this until May 2009. Parker reported several stories on Villaraigosa's political future before being reassigned.
- During a live interview on February 10, 2014, entertainment reporter Sam Rubin got a "shellacking" by actor Samuel L. Jackson after Rubin confused him with Laurence Fishburne in an opening reference to "the Super Bowl commercial". While Rubin promptly apologized and later suggested that he was referring to a different commercial, Rubin received heavy criticism from Jackson for mixing him up with "the other black guy" – in an outrage over purported racial 'in-discrimination'. Jackson also referred to other examples on Twitter.
- In September 2022, long-time news anchor Lynette Romero left the station for a weekday morning news position at cross-town rival KNBC. Romero was given the opportunity to say goodbye to viewers, but decided to take vacation time through the end of her contract. Instead, entertainment reporter Sam Rubin told viewers she was leaving the station. The following weekend, Romero's co-anchor Mark Mester delivered a four-minute monologue in which he apologized on behalf of the station for its "inappropriate" remarks about Romero's departure. Mester was suspended for the comments; the station ultimately fired him. The incident prompted a severe backlash against KTLA and its management over the handling of Romero's departure and the subsequent firing of Mester.
- On April 11, 2025, KTLA's official X account posted the "N-word". KTLA quickly deleted the post and in a follow-up, apologized and stated that the offending post was the result of a technical error that took place while they were applying language filters to their social media accounts.

==== Notable current on-air staff ====
- Gayle Anderson – reporter
- Wendy Burch – reporter
- Cher Calvin – anchor
- Dayna Devon – reporter; also host of LA Unscripted
- Courtney Friel – anchor and general assignment reporter
- Steve Hartman – sports anchor
- Jessica Holmes – anchor
- Lauren Lyster – general assignment reporter
- Micah Ohlman – anchor

==== Notable former on-air staff ====
- Carlos Amezcua (1991–2007)
- Asha Blake
- Chris Burrous
- Jann Carl
- Stan Chambers (1947–2010)
- Richard de Mille (1947–1950)
- Tom Duggan
- Steve Dunne
- Dick Enberg (1965–1975)
- Giselle Fernández (1985–1987 and 2001–2003)
- Hal Fishman (1965–1970 and 1975–2007)
- Tom Harmon (1958–1964)
- Tom Hatten (1952–1992)
- Derrin Horton – sports director
- Brad Johnson – announcer and stage manager
- Ross King
- Dick Lane (1946–1972)
- Dave Malkoff
- Rory Markas
- Larry McCormick (1971–2004)
- Brett Miller
- Frank Mottek
- Stu Nahan (1988–1999)
- Keith Olbermann (1985–1988)
- Ron Olsen (1987–2009)
- Lu Parker (2005–2026)
- Michaela Pereira (2004–2013)
- George Putnam
- Victoria Recaño (2009–2010)
- Clete Roberts (deceased)
- Sam Rubin – entertainment reporter (1991–2024)
- Brandon Rudat (2009–2010)
- Michele Ruiz (1991–1998)
- Bill Stout (1960–1963)
- Tom Snyder (1963)
- Bob Starr (1980–1989)
- Sharon Tay (1993–2004)
- Katy Tur
- Marta Waller (1984–2008)
- Jane Wells (1988–1989)
- Jennifer York (1991–2002)

== Technical information ==
=== Subchannels ===
The station's signal is multiplexed:

Subchannels of KTLA
Subchannel	Res.	Short name	Programming
5.1	720p	KTLADT	The CW
5.2	480i	Antenna	Antenna TV
5.3	480i	GritTV	Grit
5.4	480i	Outlaw	Outlaw
5.5	480i	Rewind	Rewind TV
13.1	720p	KCOP DT	KCOP-TV (Independent with MyNetworkTV)

Broadcast on behalf of another station

=== Analog-to-digital conversion ===
KTLA, in the tradition of television pioneering successes, was an FCC volunteer "early adopter" HD station. On October 28, 1998, KTLA-DT signed on with the West Coast's first commercially broadcast high definition programming. It was on UHF channel 31 in 1080i 16:9 format. Frank Geraty was the KTLA Director of Broadcast Operations and Engineering, and Ira Goldstone was the Corporate VP of Engineering. At precisely 9 a.m., VIP Milton Berle threw the ceremonial "Transmit On" switch, as he did at the Chicago World's Fair in 1939 at the birth of analog television broadcasting. The modern day event took place during KTLA's signature morning news broadcast and KTLA HD programming began simultaneously transmitting for the first time along with its analog channel. KTLA-DT went on to do the first HD Rose Parade and the first HD Dodgers baseball game broadcasts in the several months that followed.

KTLA ended regular programming on its analog signal, over VHF channel 5, on June 12, 2009, as part of the federally mandated transition from analog to digital television. The station's digital signal remained on its pre-transition UHF channel 31, using virtual channel 5.

Veteran newsman Stan Chambers, who was hired by KTLA almost a year after its 1947 launch and remained with the station until his retirement in 2010, was given the honor of "throwing" a ceremonial mock switch from the analog to digital position, signaling the engineers to shut down the analog signal at its Mount Wilson transmitter site at 10:45 pm, during KTLA's Prime News telecast. Covering the on-air event for KTLA was Stan's grandson, reporter Jaime Chambers. As part of the SAFER Act, KTLA temporarily restored its analog signal 15 minutes later at 11 p.m. to inform viewers of the digital television transition through a loop of public service announcements from the National Association of Broadcasters, which ran until June 26, 2009. It was one of four local stations (alongside KCBS-TV, KNBC, and KWHY-TV) to offer this service.

=== Spectrum auction repack ===
KTLA was one of nearly 1,000 television stations that changed their digital signal allocation in the spectrum auction repack. The station reallocated to UHF channel 35 in phase two of the auction. The spectrum change took place on March 18, 2019.

In December 2021, KTLA, KTTV and KCOP-TV became the first Los Angeles stations to broadcast in ATSC 3.0, marketed as NextGen TV. KTLA's ATSC 3.0 signal is carried on KCOP's channel 13 signal, and KTLA's channel 35 signal carries KCOP's main ATSC 1.0 channel.

=== Translators ===
- K29NN-D Lucerne Valley
- K30GU-D Morongo Valley
- K27NX-D Ridgecrest
- K15FC-D Twentynine Palms
