= Jack Gross =

Jack Gross may refer to:

- Jack Gross (screenwriter) (1929–2007), American film screenwriter and television writer
- Jack J. Gross (1902–1964), American film and television producer
- Jack O. Gross (1905–1985), founded KFMB-TV, the first television station in San Diego
- Jack Gross (endocrinologist) (1921–1994), Canadian-Israeli endocrinologist
