= The Beverly Hills Courier =

Newspaper in California, US

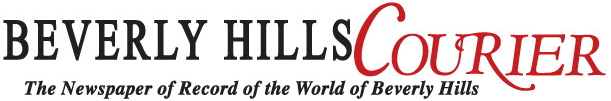
- Type: Free weekly newspaper published Fridays
- Format: Compact
- Owner: BH Courier Acquisition LLC
- Publisher: John Bendheim & Lisa Bloch
- Founded: July 22, 1965
- Headquarters: 499 North Canon Drive; Suite 400; Beverly Hills, California 90210
- Country: United States
- ISSN: 0892-645X
- Website: www.bhcourier.com

The Beverly Hills Courier is a free weekly tabloid-sized print newspaper of circulation in Beverly Hills and the surrounding communities, and a daily web newspaper.

== History ==
The publication was founded by March Schwartz in 1965. His staff included managing editor Arthur M. Goldberg from 1966 to 2003. Both individuals were products of the long-defunct evening companion newspaper to the Los Angeles Times, the Los Angeles Mirror, where Schwartz was the classified sales manager and Goldberg was the editor. In 2004, the Courier's then-editor, Norma Zager, was awarded Journalist of the Year by the Los Angeles Press Club for her series on a lawsuit brought by Erin Brockovich.

In 2004, after suffering a debilitating stroke, Schwartz reluctantly sold the Courier to The San Marino Tribune Company, Inc. whose owner, attorney Clifton S. Smith, Jr., assumed the role of publisher of the Courier. Smith staffed the newspaper with former The Hollywood Reporter columnist George Christy whose Courier column has appeared on foxnews.com. Guest columnists included Joan Rivers. Rabbi Jacob Pressman published a weekly column. Courier articles have been cited by the Los Angeles Times.

The Courier subscribes to Agence France-Presse and City News Service. Its website features updates throughout the day, seven days a week. The entire print edition is also available from the website. The paper is delivered free to residences each Friday. As of 2013, it self-reports a circulation of 40,000.

Smith sold the Courier to entrepreneur Paula Kent Meehan, co-founder of the Redken hair-care company, in April 2014 – just two months before Meehan's death. Associate publisher Marcia Wilson Hobbs replaced Smith as the publisher. BH Courier Acquisition, LLC acquired the "Courier" from the estate of Paula Kent Meehan in September, 2019.

== Reception ==
The Courier has been described as "conservative" by LA Weekly blogger Dennis Romero in a city which is "heavily liberal and Democratic". Josh E. Gross, publisher of the competing Beverly Hills Weekly, described Clifton S. Smith Jr., the Courier's then owner/publisher, as "right-wing" and "bombastic". A 2013 Los Angeles Times article about the Courier noted that "Smith delivers his opinions on civic matters in the heavily Democratic city through tart editorials that lean libertarian."

The Los Angeles County Metropolitan Transportation Authority has criticized the Courier for publishing errors and misleading statements with regards to the D Line Extension. Damien Newton of LA streetsblog has accused the Courier of publishing libel with its coverage of seismology experts who weighed in on the geotechnical issues facing the subway extension.

Two-time Beverly Hills mayor Barry Brucker accused the Courier of being biased in its coverage of the local city government and various development projects. Then-Beverly Hills City Manager, Jeff Kolin, accused the Courier of printing false allegations with regard to an article alleging city staff had falsified documents concerning city water rates, and has rebuked the paper for being misleading by confounding the city's 2012 budgetary surplus with unfunded pension liabilities.

== See also ==
- Beverly Hills Post
- Beverly Hills Weekly
- Canyon News
