= Rick Roberts (radio personality) =

American conservative talk radio host (born 1954)

Rick Roberts (born 1954) is an American conservative talk radio host who most recently hosted an afternoon show on WBAP (AM) in the Dallas/Fort Worth market. He was formerly on KOKC AM and later KTOK AM in Oklahoma City during morning drive, 5am to 8am. He has a law degree.

== Early life and career ==
Born in Oklahoma City, Roberts grew up there and in Texas. Initially an oil and gas lease attorney, Roberts hosted seminars for other attorneys, leading to his first talk radio job around 1992 at KYGO, then at KOA in Denver.

== Radio career ==
From 1994 to 1995, Roberts was a host at KCMO in Kansas City, Missouri. From 1996 to 1997, Roberts hosted a talk show on KRLD in Dallas.

Roberts began the first of two stints in San Diego in 1997 on KOGO with a show dubbed the Court of Public Opinion. In 2000, Roberts joined rival KFMB, first as afternoon drive host. Roberts provided extensive analysis and coverage of the murder of Danielle van Dam in 2002, including "sharp questions about the activities of the slain girl's parents." (Ultimately, a neighbor was convicted of van Dam's murder.) In August 2002, after proceedings from a secret court hearing relating to the case were played on the Roberts show, an assistant producer for the show was removed from court proceedings.

Roberts moved to morning drive on KFMB in 2003, replacing Ted Leitner. In 2009, Roberts's KFMB show was among six local conservative talk radio shows in California measured by Arbitron to have a weekly audience of more than 100,000. In January 2011, Roberts returned to his former afternoon drive slot as KFMB debuted a new morning show. Roberts left KFMB in December 2011 after 11 years, with Roger Hedgecock replacing his show after moving from KOGO.

After leaving KFMB, Roberts joined Talk Radio Network as co-anchor for its America's Radio News Network program. He later hosted talk shows on KKFT in Reno, Nevada and KTOK in Oklahoma City. In 2014, the Council on American-Islamic Relations highlighted comments Roberts made on his KKFT show calling on American Muslims and mosques to be placed on a "watch list."

In January 2016, Roberts returned to Dallas to host an afternoon show on WBAP. Roberts departed WBAP on or about August 2, 2023. A job posting seeking talent for the time slot appeared on the company website.

Roberts has been a guest host on national shows including The Savage Nation and Red Eye Radio.

=== Themes ===
During his radio shows, he often makes a point to call out names of known sexual offenders living in the city from which he broadcast.

A monologue titled "I want my country back" has been a common theme throughout Roberts's radio career, described in 2016 by the Associated Press as "a 4½-minute rant that darts from fear of crime to outsourced jobs to political correctness."
