= Channel 69 =

Channel 69 refers to several television stations:

== Canada ==
The following television stations operate on virtual channel 69 in Canada:

- CFMT-DT-1 in London, Ontario

== United States ==
The following low-power television station, which is no longer licensed, formerly broadcast on analog channel 69 (UHF frequencies covering 800-806 MHz) in the United States:

- KDFL-LP in Lubbock, Texas

== See also ==
- Channel 69 virtual TV stations in the United States
