= Jack Gross (screenwriter) =

American screenwriter

Jack Gross Jr.
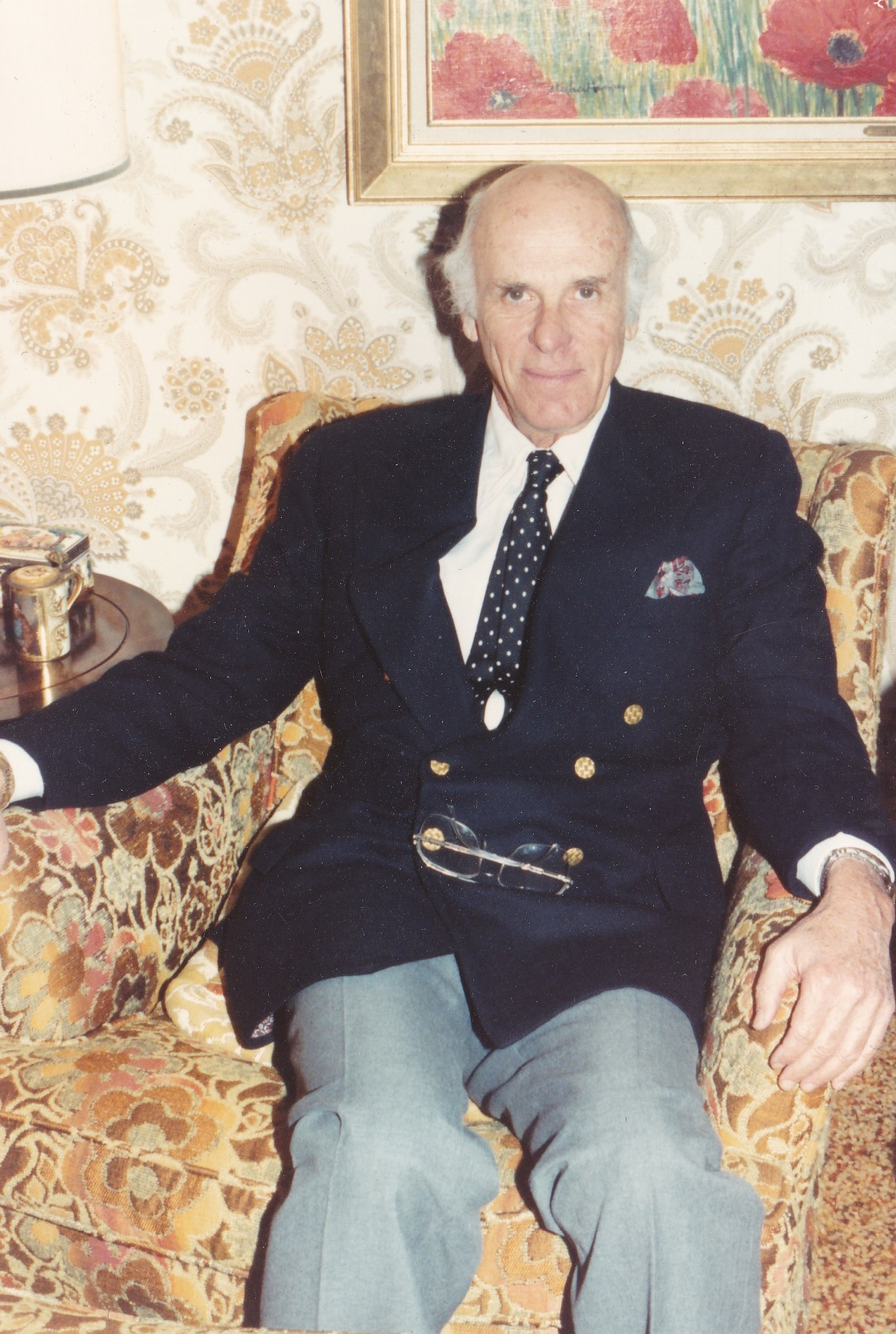
- Jack Gross Jr.
- Born: February 4, 1929; Fort Worth, Texas
- Died: December 14, 2007 (aged 78); La Jolla, California
- Occupations: American film screenwriter; situation comedy writer

Jack Gross Jr. (February 4, 1929 – December 14, 2007) was an American film screenwriter and television situation comedy writer.

== Biography ==
Gross was born in Fort Worth, Texas. His father, Jack O. Gross, founded KFMB-TV, the first television station in San Diego in May 1949. His brother Laurence Gross was an entertainment critic on KNSD TV.

He wrote the screenplays for Clay Pigeon and Welcome to Arrow Beach (1974). On television, he wrote episodes of Gilligan's Island, Diff'rent Strokes and My Favorite Martian.

He graduated Point Loma High School in 1947. He was a graduate of San Fernando Valley State College, now known as CSUN, and the USC School of Cinematic Arts. Gross died of heart failure in La Jolla, California. He is a member of the Point Loma High School Wall of Fame.

His son is Josh E. Gross, publisher of Beverly Hills Weekly.
