= Sandra Maas =

American broadcast journalist (born 1963)

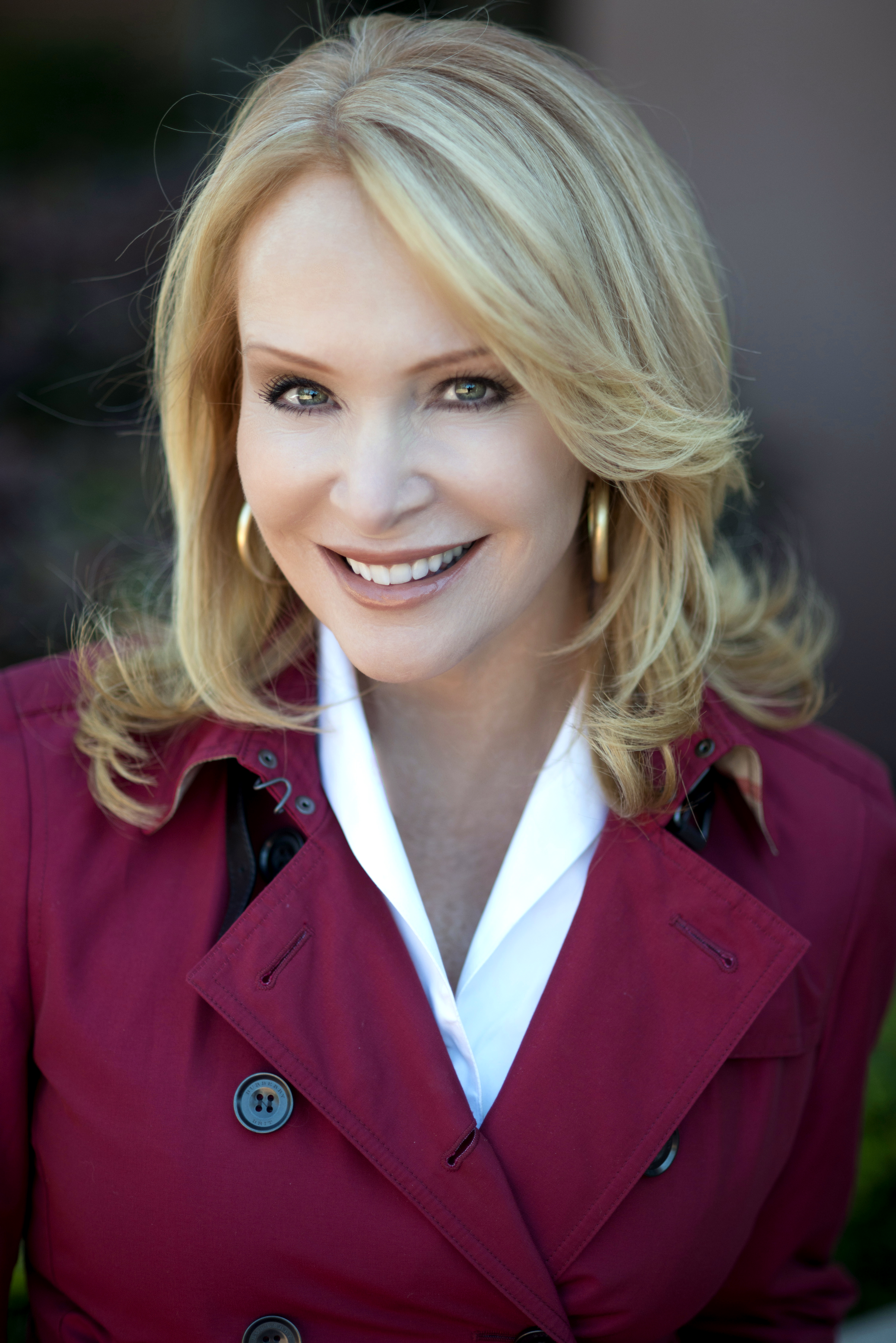
- Born: Sandra Lynn Maas; January 13, 1963 (age 63)
- Other name: Sandra Lynn Burgess
- Occupation: Broadcast journalist (1983-present)
- Years active: 1983-present
- Spouse: Jim Burgess (m. 1986)
- Children: 2
- Website: www.sandramaasmedia.com

Sandra Lynn Maas (born January 13, 1963) is an American television news anchor, Emmy Award-winning journalist and an advocate for Equal Pay. She has worked in the San Diego, California area since 1990 and is the founding host of the Trailblazing Women video series for the Women’s Museum of California.

== Early life and education ==
Sandra Lynn Maas was born on January 13, 1963, raised in Mission Viejo, California. Her father, Frank Maas, owned a window tinting business and her mother, Dorothea (Brockman) Maas, was an elementary school principal. She graduated summa cum laude from California State University, Chico, with a Bachelor of Arts degree in communications in 1985. During college, Maas worked as a news anchor for KCHO Chico and KPAY newstalk radio, Redding. She transitioned to television during her senior year in college, serving as weeknight co-anchor at ABC affiliate, KRCR-TV.

== Career ==
In 1986, Maas moved to NBC affiliate KSBY-TV in San Luis Obispo, California, where she co-anchored the 6 and 11 p.m. newscasts. Maas also served as the station's medical reporter at the start of the AIDS crisis, earning a Golden Mike Award for her on-air work.

In 1990, Maas relocated to San Diego and CBS Affiliate KFMB-TV, where she co-anchored News 8 at 4pm with Mitch Duncan. In addition, she served as the station's medical reporter and worked for CBS Newspath as a national medical correspondent. During this time, Maas was also a regular fill-in on the Jeff and Jer Morning Show on Star 94.1. In 1993, she had a bit part in the CBS soap opera, The Young and the Restless, playing the role of nurse Sally Winslow. In 2001, Maas was part of a mass exodus that left KFMB-TV when it severed ties with the American Federation of Television and Radio Artists. She resigned after an unsuccessful contract renegotiation. In 2002, Maas was a freelance journalist for then-Fox affiliate XETV in San Diego. In 2004, Maas moved to KUSI-TV, serving first as a co-anchor on Good Morning San Diego and in 2006 adding host duties for the lifestyle show Inside San Diego with Andrea Naversen. In 2009, she became weeknight co-anchor of The KUSI News at 6 and 10pm with Allen Denton.

Maas has served as a moderator for the Ernst & Young Entrepreneur of the Year Awards from 1993 to 2019. She also volunteers as Mistress of Ceremonies or moderator for several non-profit organization events.

In 2020, Maas joined the board of the Women's Museum of California in San Diego and became the board president in 2022. As a board member, she launched 'Trailblazing Women,' a video series that she hosted for the museum, which won a regional Emmy in 2023.

In 2024, Maas became a trustee at the San Diego History Center in Balboa Park and merged Women’s Museum of California into the San Diego History Center in 2025, creating the Center for Women’s History.

== Equal pay lawsuit ==
On June 25, 2019 Maas filed a lawsuit alleging discriminatory practices by KUSI-TV and station General Manager Mike McKinnon Jr. in particular. She claims she was abruptly terminated for attempting to open a dialogue about compensation. The trial started on February 3, 2023.

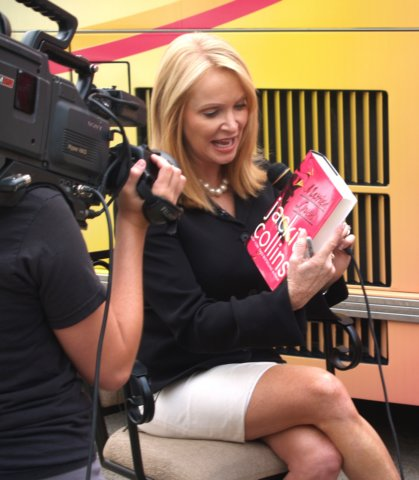
Sandra Maas during a live interview.

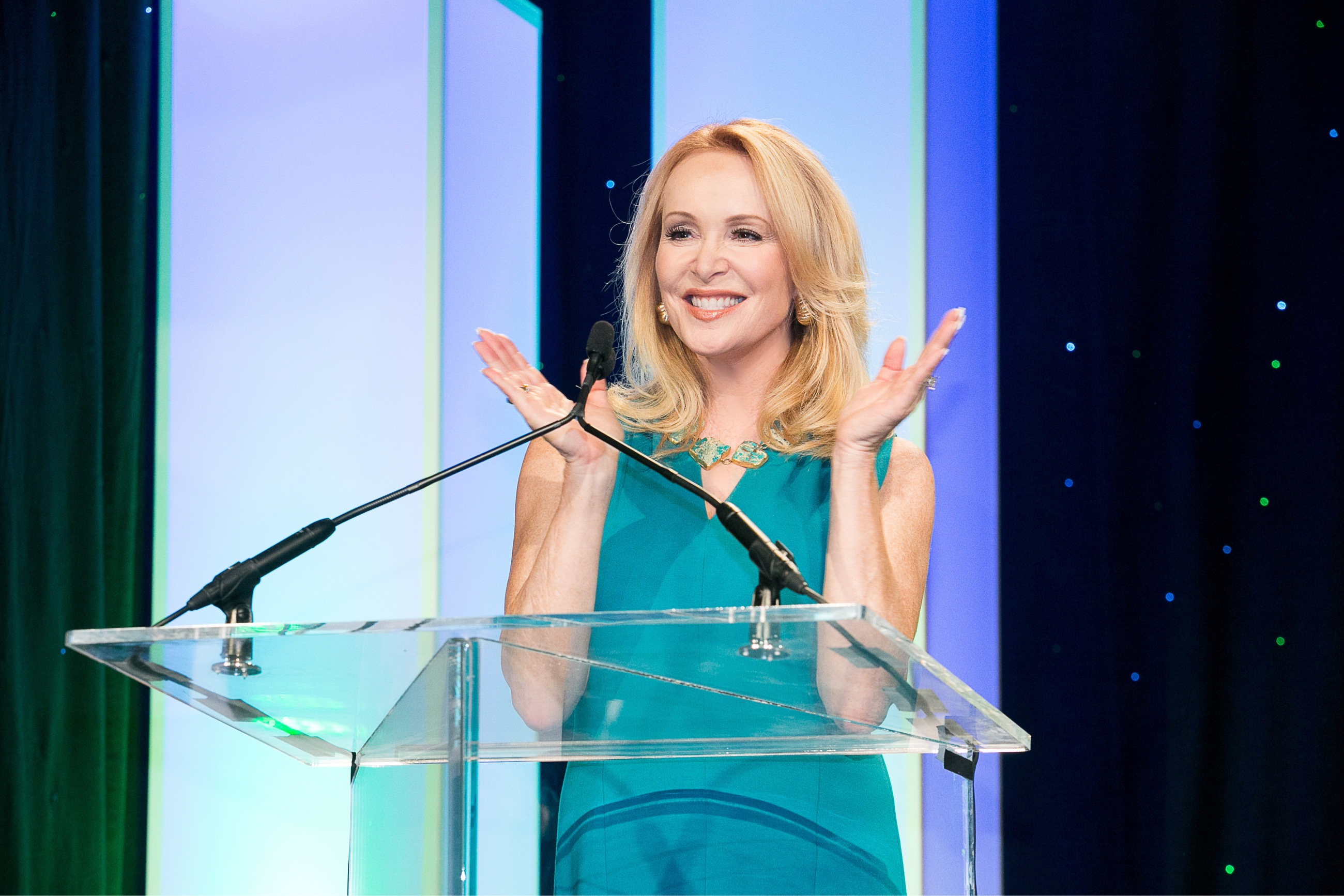
Sandra Maas emceeing Ernst & Young Entrepreneur of the Year Awards

On March 9, 2023 a San Diego Superior Court jury awarded Maas more than 1.7 million from McKinnon Broadcasting, the company that owned KUSI-TV at the time, finding that the station violated equal pay laws by paying Maas less than her co-anchor. The jury also found for Maas in her whistleblower claim, but ruled KUSI was not liable for age or gender discrimination.

On January 13, 2026, San Diego’s 4th District Court of Appeal, Division 1, upheld the judgment, ruling that the now defunct McKinnon Broadcasting Company’s challenges to the jury verdict were unpersuasive.

== Awards and recognition ==
- In 2011, she received an Associated Press Mark Twain Award for her contribution to “Oxy: What Your Kids Aren’t Telling You,” and a San Diego Press Club Award for investigative reporting.
- She has also received a Golden Mike Award and has been inducted into The Silver Circle of The National Academy of Television Arts & Sciences.
- In 2016, Maas was honored as a "Woman of Dedication" by the Salvation Army for her philanthropic work.
- In 2017, Maas was recognized by Ranch & Coast Magazine as "Best News Personality."
- In 2021, Maas was honored by The San Diego Business Journal as a "Woman of Influence."
- In 2023, Maas was recognized as a ‘Woman of Distinction’ by San Diego Mayor Todd Gloria, for being an advocate for pay equity in the workplace.
- In 2023, Maas won the Southwest Regional Emmy Award for Best Interview/Discussion, for her discussion Lift Our Voices with journalists Gretchen Carlson and Julie Roginsky about non-disclosure agreements (NDAs) in sexual harassment cases.

== Community contributions ==
Maas served as moderator for the Greater San Diego Regional Chamber of Commerce Congressional Delegation debate. She has also hosted The San Diego County District Attorney's "The National Crime Vigil."

She has hosted or acted as mistress of ceremonies for fundraisers for the Salvation Army, the Make-A-Wish Foundation, The ARC-San Diego, and Rady Children's Hospital.
