= KUSI-TV =

Television station in San Diego

ATSC 3.0 station
- San Diego, California; United States
- Channels: Digital: 18 (UHF); Virtual: 51
- Branding: KUSI, CW San Diego; KUSI News

Programming
- Affiliations: 51.1: The CW; 51.2: Rewind TV

Ownership
- Owner: Nexstar Media Group; (Nexstar Media Inc.)
- Sister stations: KSWB-TV; Tegna: KFMB-TV

History
- First air date: September 13, 1982
- Former channel numbers: Analog: 51 (UHF, 1982–2009)
- Former affiliations: Independent (1982–1995, 1998–2026); UPN (1995–1998)
- Call sign meaning: Station was built by United States International University

Technical information
- Licensing authority: FCC
- Facility ID: 10238
- ERP: 355 kW
- HAAT: 576 m (1,890 ft)
- Transmitter coordinates: 32°41′51″N 116°56′5.7″W

Links
- Public license information: Public file; LMS
- Website: fox5sandiego.com

KUSI-TV (channel 51, cable channel 9) is a television station in San Diego, California, United States, serving as the area's CW outlet. It is owned by Nexstar Media Group alongside Fox affiliate KSWB-TV (channel 69); Nexstar's Tegna subsidiary owns CBS affiliate KFMB-TV (channel 8). KUSI-TV and KSWB-TV share studios on Viewridge Avenue (near I-15) in the Kearny Mesa section of San Diego; KUSI-TV's transmitter is located southeast of Spring Valley.

After a 15-year dispute over permit ownership that almost derailed the launch of the station on multiple occasions, KUSI began broadcasting in 1982 as a partnership between United States International University and McKinnon Broadcasting Company. It was the first independent station built in San Diego proper. Financial and accreditation problems at USIU led to the sale of its stake to McKinnon in 1990, with McKinnon exercising veto power to block any sale to another entity. McKinnon then started KUSI's news department, which has since grown to produce newscasts throughout the day. In 2023, McKinnon sold KUSI to Nexstar; the station joined The CW in March 2026 after Nexstar completed its purchase of KFMB owner Tegna. KUSI's transmitter broadcasts it and KSWB-TV in ATSC 3.0 (NextGen TV) format.

== History ==
=== 15 years of fighting ===
The construction permit for a channel 51 television station in San Diego was first issued on June 23, 1965, to Jack O. Gross, who had previously founded KFMB-TV (channel 8), as KJOG-TV. The permit was issued after applications by Gross and California Western University of San Diego were filed the year before; Gross proposed a conventional independent station, while the private university planned a station with "high educational and cultural content". In October 1967, with the station still unbuilt, California Western filed to have the station transferred to it, stating that Gross was refusing to abide by an agreement reached that April to sell the station to CWU for $16,000 in expenses. However, a complication arose when Gross informed the Federal Communications Commission (FCC) that he had reached another deal to sell the station to the Broadmoor Broadcasting Corporation, owned by Michael and Dan McKinnon alongside local radio stations KSON (1240 AM) and KSEA (97.3 FM) and television station KIII of Corpus Christi, Texas, for $15,000. Under that agreement, Broadmoor would honor a deal brokered with the university, which had also applied for the channel, to acquire 50 percent. The situation, in which Gross reached sale agreements with two different buyers, prompted the FCC to designate an application to extend the life of the construction permit for hearing in late 1968, by which time the university had changed its name to United States International University (USIU).

FCC administrative law judge Basil P. Cooper in 1970 ruled that Gross had trafficked in the permit, by retaining an interest without the obligation to make further funds available, but granted the time extension. However, the FCC's review board, later joined by the full commission, reversed the initial decision in 1972 and denied the application for more time to build the station. A year later, however, the commission granted authority to extend the permit in order to consider the 1967 application to sell it to USIU, finding that Gross's actions did not merit immediate disqualification and would unfairly harm USIU.

Broadmoor continued to challenge any authority by USIU to build KJOG-TV, and in 1975, the FCC designated the university's acquisition of the construction permit for hearing, this time over concerns about whether USIU was financially qualified to construct the station and whether financial issues at the university itself, spurred by a long-delayed and complicated land sale in the early 1970s and the collapse of one of the university's major lenders, weighed on its capacity. A religious group, Christian Communications Network, intervened in the proceeding in a bid to seek the use of the channel; it provided Christian television programming on local cable. On June 7, 1977, administrative law judge David I. Kraushaar ruled against the proposed transfer to USIU and its affiliate University Television, Inc., concerned over the financial issues and by cost estimates that were extremely low during a period of major inflation.

=== Early years and sale to McKinnon ===
In October 1980, administrative law judge James F. Tierney finally adjudicated the matter for good and granted the transfer application to University Television, dismissing Christian Communications's complaints as unfounded. Even though the university was still showing signs of financial stress, two private financiers—USIU trustee Predrag Mitrovich and St. Louis businessman Allen Portnoy—stepped in to provide the necessary funding. A year later, USIU hired the McKinnons to provide financial and management support to USIU, with an option to buy a minority stake. On September 13, 1982—more than 17 years after the permit was granted—the station finally began broadcasting as KUSI-TV. It operated as a general entertainment independent station, airing a mix of children's programs, sitcoms, older movies, and sporting events. Beginning in 1985, the San Diego Padres moved their games to KUSI from KCST-TV (channel 39) due to problems with network preemptions and to sell their own advertising.

By the end of the decade, however, the university's financial condition had worsened again; further, the Western Association of Schools and Colleges was threatening to revoke its accreditation. USIU was anxious to sell the station and receive a much-needed cash infusion to pay down debt, but McKinnon's ownership of 26 percent of University Television gave him veto power over any proposed transaction, and he had made several offers to buy out USIU. The dispute between the two parties escalated in December 1989, when Michael McKinnon sued the university for $7 million, alleging that the university was still using his leased equipment despite not renewing the lease. USIU negotiated with ABRY Partners—owners of stations in Boston, Cincinnati and elsewhere—to potentially purchase channel 51, but McKinnon did not want to sell out, stalling any efforts. An effort by McKinnon to purchase the university's shares failed in late January 1990, after the station filed for bankruptcy protection. When the agreement to sell to McKinnon collapsed, USIU asked some of its highest-paid employees to delay picking up their paychecks.

Just weeks later, however, McKinnon entered into a deal to purchase the remainder of KUSI for $26.2 million; his offer was preferable to a higher-priced bid by ABRY because it would allow USIU access to money faster at a time when it needed cash to make payroll. Immediately, McKinnon announced plans to add a 10 p.m. local newscast and use KUSI as a "test market" for new local and national programs.

=== UPN affiliation, Fox push and return to independence ===
McKinnon's ownership provided much-needed stability and revitalization to KUSI. The 10 p.m. newscast was followed by the introduction of a morning newscast in January 1994. By 1995, the station was worth an estimated $75 million. Taking inspiration from KTLA in Los Angeles, KUSI built up its news service and affiliated with UPN. At the same time, KFMB-TV lured the Padres from KUSI under a new radio and television contract.

In November 1995, in an attempt to take the Fox affiliation away from Tijuana-based XETV (channel 6), KUSI filed an appeal against the FCC's decision to grant Fox a permit that was necessary to provide XETV, a Mexican station, with live sports (including NFL games and other programming. This was the second time McKinnon had protested the Fox-XETV tie-up; he had made an earlier unsuccessful attempt to pull the Fox affiliation from XETV in April 1991. The permit was granted to Fox on behalf of XETV, and the case was settled on March 26, 1996.

KUSI dropped UPN when its affiliation agreement with the network expired on January 16, 1998, citing low ratings for the network's programming locally. UPN programming remained available in the market on local cable providers via the network's Los Angeles affiliate, KCOP-TV, whose continued presence in the market also played a factor in KUSI dropping the UPN affiliation. No over-the-air affiliate for UPN existed in the market until late 1999, when new station XHUPN-TV (now XHDTV-TDT) began broadcasting from Tecate, Baja California.

In 1998, KUSI started to plan a new state-of-the-art streetside studio facility along with 194 apartments in downtown San Diego near the convention center. However, in the fall of 2007, the site that was intended to house its new studio facilities was eventually sold to a development company for residential and mixed-use construction. KUSI continued to operate from its Kearny Mesa studios. After McKinnon Broadcasting sold its two Texas stations, KBMT in Beaumont and KIII in Corpus Christi, to the London Broadcasting Company in separate transactions in 2009 and 2010, KUSI became the company's only remaining television station property.

==== Sandra Maas lawsuit ====
In 2019, KUSI anchor Sandra Maas left the station and sued McKinnon for $10 million in an age and gender discrimination lawsuit. She alleged that she had begun seeking a raise in 2017 after learning that men with less seniority at the station made more money than her, and when she sought the same salary that her recently departed co-anchor, Allen Denton, was working—$70,000 more than her own—her contract was not renewed. Documents in the case also contained the allegation that, in the wake of the dispute, KUSI refused to cover an equal pay dispute involving the United States women's national soccer team. The case was then scheduled to go to trial in December 2022, later pushed to February 2023. At trial, a jury awarded Maas $1.5 million on her whistleblower claim and found KUSI to have violated California's Equal Pay Act, but it rejected the discrimination claims and the contention that the station had acted with malice; McKinnon Broadcasting's lawyer announced an intention to appeal the verdict.

=== Sale to Nexstar Media Group ===
On May 8, 2023, Nexstar Media Group announced its intent to purchase KUSI-TV for $35 million; this would create a duopoly with Fox affiliate KSWB-TV (channel 69). In a news release, Nexstar noted that it expected the transaction would "be accretive to Nexstar's operating results when The CW Network affiliation becomes available in the market". The sale to Nexstar was completed on August 31.

Nexstar announced their purchase of Tegna Inc., owner of KFMB-TV, on August 19, 2025. The deal was completed on March 19, 2026, after the FCC's Media Bureau waived restrictions prohibiting ownership of more than two full-power licenses in markets such as San Diego. After the sale closed, KUSI began airing CW programming that day, transferring it from a KFMB subchannel. A temporary restraining order issued one week later by the U.S. District Court for the Eastern District of California, later escalated to a preliminary injunction, has prevented KFMB from being integrated into KSWB and KUSI.

== Local programming ==
=== Newscasts ===
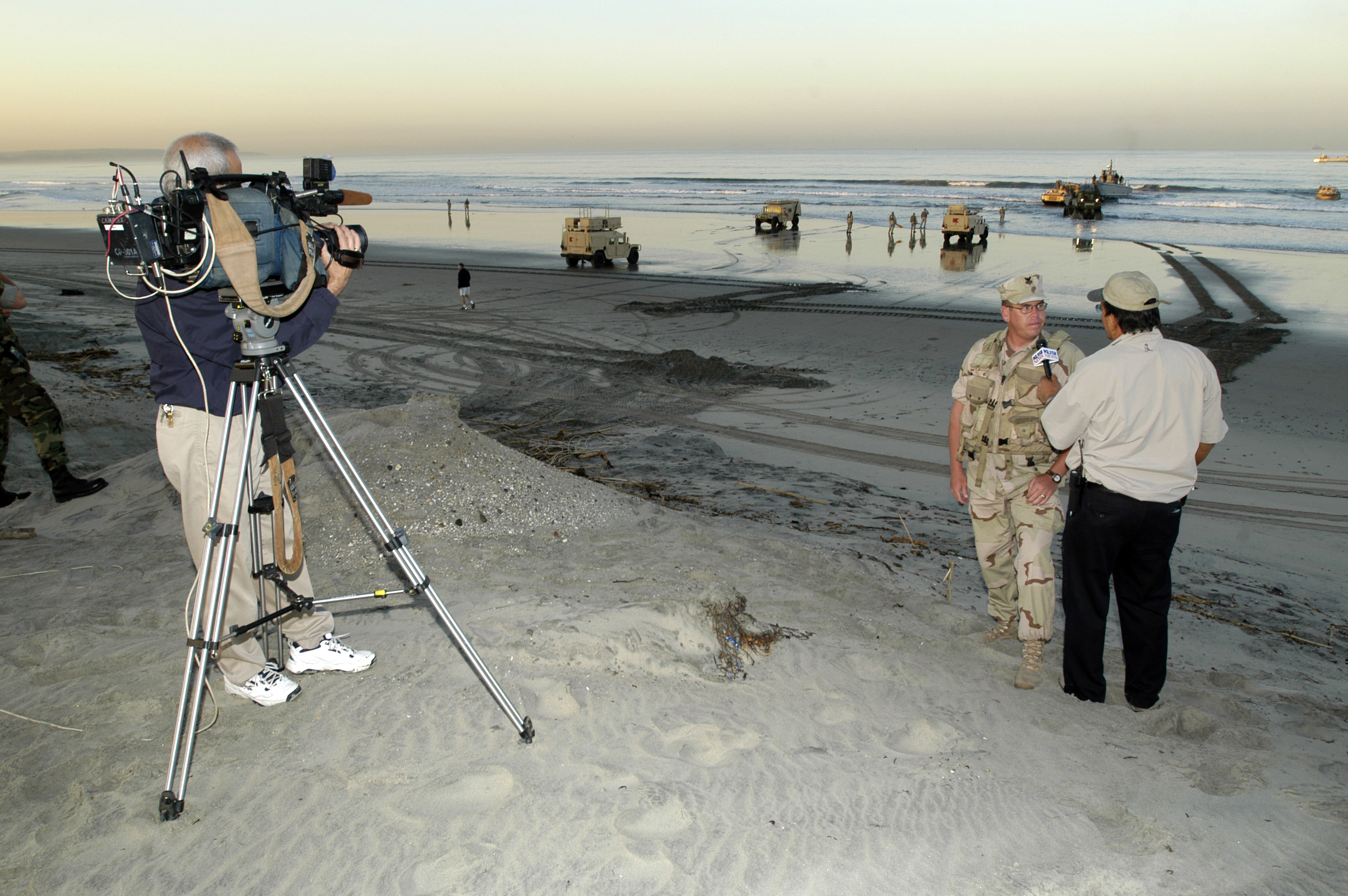
Rod Luck reports from Naval Amphibious Base Coronado on KUSI's morning news in 2005.

After considering the possibility in 1984 when it advertised positions for a news director and anchors, KUSI became active in the local television news race with the introduction of an hour-long 10 p.m. newscast on September 26, 1990; it launched without fanfare, deemed ready for air after days of rehearsals. Originally anchored by veteran television anchors Roger Grimsby and George Reading, it was the first television station in San Diego to begin producing local newscasts since XETV canceled an independently produced 10 p.m. newscast in 1980. Grimsby resigned in 1991 after he felt the station's news format was becoming too typical. On January 5, 1994, the station debuted a three-hour weekday morning newscast from 6 to 9 a.m. Originally anchored by Laura Buxton and Tom Blair (who was later replaced by Stan Miller), it gradually became a competitor to the national morning newscasts. In 1995, McKinnon contemplated giving the station an extended prime time newscast, not unlike KCAL-TV in Los Angeles.

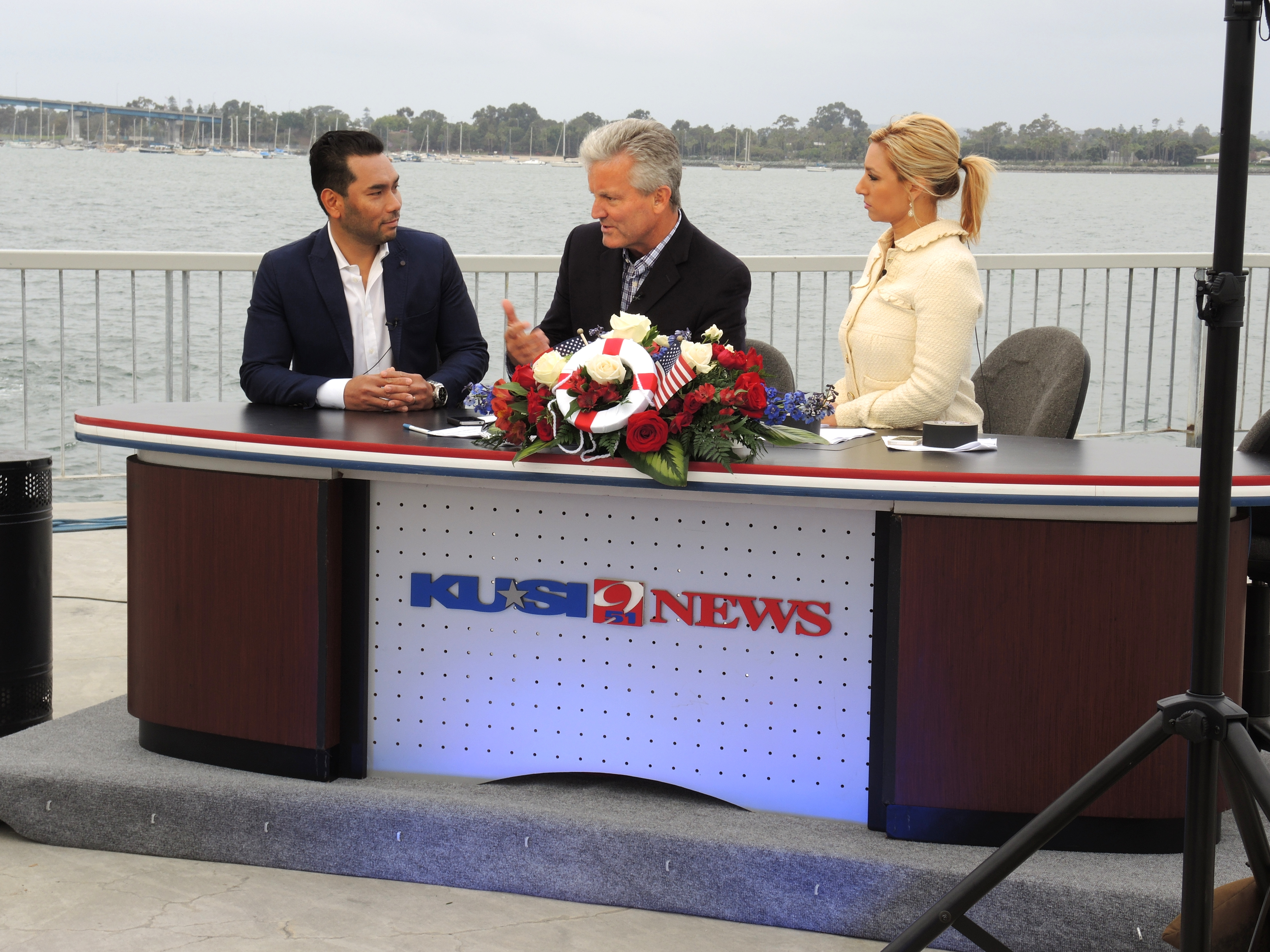
A KUSI remote broadcast from the Port of San Diego in 2013

The station is known for its series of civic and consumer watchdog reports during its evening newscasts called The Turko Files, helmed by investigative reporter Michael Turko (who regularly utters the line "It Ain't Right" during the segments). From 1994 to 2014, John Coleman, a longtime Chicago weatherman and co-founder of The Weather Channel, served as KUSI's chief meteorologist, appearing on its evening newscasts. During his tenure at the station, Coleman was known for his trademark drawn-out pronunciation of the station's call letters ("K-uuuuuuuuuuu-S-I") and providing his own lively presentation during the forecast segments. He also was criticized in his later years for his vocal stance as a denier of climate change, which had led to two TV specials on the topic and presentations across the United States. Coleman retired from broadcasting in April 2014 after a 61-year career.

In January 2000, KUSI expanded its news programming into early evenings with the debut of a half-hour newscast at 7 p.m.; within a few months, however, the program was moved to 6:30 p.m. Subsequently, in July 2001, an additional half-hour newscast at 6 p.m. was launched, followed by a half-hour of news at 11 p.m. in January 2005. On April 1, 2010, beginning with the station's 6 p.m. newscast, KUSI became the fourth television station in the San Diego market to begin broadcasting its local newscasts in high definition.

In filings for the Maas trial, McKinnon attorneys acknowledged that the station is "widely viewed in San Diego as a right-of-center news organization". KUSI's newscast drew criticism in December 2019 for an interview with Congressman Duncan D. Hunter in which the only questions asked were those suggested by his staff. In 2021, KUSI ceased airing content from local iHeartMedia radio stations on its morning show after a segment about "Famous Baby Daddies" was criticized as racist by the San Diego chapter of the NAACP, which noted that it overrepresented Black men and perpetuated stereotypes.

==== Notable former on-air staff ====
- Carlos Amezcua – morning anchor (2015–2019)
- Ross Becker – weeknight anchor (2010–2016)
- Michael Tuck – weeknight anchor (2005–2007)

=== Sports programming ===
From 1987 to 1994 and again from 1997 to 2003, KUSI held the over-the-air television rights to San Diego Padres Major League Baseball games; during the second tenure, the station had only broadcast the team's Sunday games, which were produced by 4SD until becoming exclusive to the cable channel in 2004. In 2023 and 2024, KUSI aired The CW's coverage of LIV Golf instead of local CW affiliate KFMB 8.2. Since 2025, KUSI has served as the local broadcaster for locally televised San Diego State Aztecs men's and women's basketball games.

== Technical information ==
KUSI-TV's subchannels are broadcast by KSWB-TV in ATSC 1.0 format, while KUSI-TV offers the subchannels of both stations in ATSC 3.0 (NextGen TV) format. It transmits from San Miguel Mountain.

Subchannels provided by KUSI-TV on the KSWB-TV multiplex (ATSC 1.0)
Subchannel	Res.	Short name	Programming
51.1	720p	KUSI HD	The CW
51.2	480i	Rewind	Rewind TV

Subchannels of KUSI-TV (ATSC 3.0)
Subchannel	Res.	Short name	Programming
51.1	720p	KUSI	The CW
69.1	720p	KSWB	Fox (KSWB-TV)

=== Analog-to-digital conversion ===
KUSI-TV shut down its analog signal, over UHF channel 51, on June 12, 2009, the official date on which full-power television stations in the United States transitioned from analog to digital broadcasts under federal mandate. The station's digital signal remained on its pre-transition UHF channel 18, using virtual channel 51.

=== Translator ===
KUSI owns one dependent translator, K03JB-D in Temecula. Originally K12PO, this station was out of service for several years due to repacking-related reasons. It went silent on March 15, 2019, as its former channel 12 was reassigned to KDOC-TV in the Los Angeles area. A filing for channel 15 was objected to by public safety users in the Los Angeles area, which use channel 15 frequencies for communications purposes; a series of legal hurdles and engineering challenges delayed the construction of a channel 3 facility. The station was licensed for digital operation as K03JB-D effective August 15, 2023.

=== ATSC 3.0 conversion ===
On January 16, 2024, KUSI-TV switched to ATSC 3.0 (NextGen TV) broadcasting of KUSI and KSWB's main channels. The KSWB transmitter began broadcasting KUSI's lone subchannel; Rewind TV, which had been channel 69.5 prior to the switch, became 51.2.

== See also ==
- Channel 9 branded TV stations in the United States
- Channel 18 digital TV stations in the United States
- Channel 51 virtual TV stations in the United States
