= KGB (AM) =

Radio station in San Diego, California

- San Diego, California; United States
- Broadcast area: San Diego–Tijuana
- Frequency: 760 kHz
- Branding: San Diego Sports 760

Programming
- Format: Sports radio
- Affiliations: Fox Sports Radio; Los Angeles Lakers; San Diego FC; San Diego Gulls; San Diego State Aztecs

Ownership
- Owner: iHeartMedia, Inc.; (iHM Licenses, LLC)
- Sister stations: KGB-FM; KHTS-FM; KIOZ; KLSD; KMYI; KOGO; KSSX

History
- First air date: August 19, 1941
- Former call signs: KFMB (1941–2020)
- Former frequencies: 1450 kHz (1941–1948); 550 kHz (1948–1954); 540 kHz (1954–1965)
- Call sign meaning: George Bowles (station manager of the original KGB, 1928–1931), Keep Going Broadcasting

Technical information
- Licensing authority: FCC
- Facility ID: 42120
- Class: B
- Power: 5,000 watts (day); 50,000 watts (night)
- Transmitter coordinates: 32°50′33.2″N 117°1′33.1″W
- Repeater: (101.5-2) KGB-HD2 (San Diego)

Links
- Public license information: Public file; LMS
- Webcast: Listen live (via iHeartRadio)
- Website: sportssd.iheart.com

KGB (760 AM) is a broadcast radio station. Licensed to San Diego, California, it is owned by iHeartMedia and airs a sports radio format. KGB has local sports talk shows; play-by-play coverage of San Diego State Aztecs football and basketball, Los Angeles Lakers basketball, San Diego Gulls hockey, and San Diego FC soccer; and national programming from Fox Sports Radio.

The station first broadcast in 1941 as KFMB, founded by aerospace engineer Warren Burnham Worcester broadcasting mostly classical music. In 1943, Jack O. Gross bought KFMB radio and later added two sister stations: KFMB-TV channel 8 and KFMB-FM, first at 101.5 MHz and later at 100.7 MHz. The trio of stations were owned by Chicago-based Midwest Television from 1964 to 2017. For much of the 1960s and 1970s, KFMB AM had a full service format combining Middle of the Road (MOR) music, as well as news and sports. KFMB AM was one of the most popular radio stations in San Diego from the mid-1970s to late 1980s. At that point, the station shifted away from music to emphasize talk shows. As a talk station, KFMB featured hosts including Ted Leitner, Hank Bauer, Rick Roberts and Roger Hedgecock, with a focus on conservative talk shows.

In 2017, Tegna Inc. bought the KFMB radio and TV stations from Midwest Television, then sold the KFMB radio stations to Local Media San Diego in 2019. Less than a year later, iHeartMedia bought KFMB AM and changed its call sign to KGB. In 2022, iHeartMedia changed KGB's format from talk to sports and moved much of KGB's talk programming to sister stations KOGO and KLSD.

== History as KFMB ==
=== Early years (1941–1946) ===
In 1940, the Worcester Broadcasting Corporation obtained a construction permit for a 250-watt radio station. Its president, Warren Burnham Worcester, was an aircraft designer and engineer from a prominent family in Worcester, Massachusetts. Worcester Broadcasting's station had the call sign KFMB, named after Worcester's children: the "M" for daughter Mary and "B" for son Burnham. The Federal Communications Commission (FCC) construction permit was for 1420 kHz. By the time the station signed on, all stations on 1420 kHz had moved to 1450 kHz as a result of the North American Regional Broadcasting Agreement (NARBA).

With its broadcast tower atop the Spreckels Building, KFMB debuted at 8 pm on August 19, 1941. Its studios were at the corner of Pacific Highway and Ash Street, then known as Pacific Square. KFMB's opening night featured classical music and opera performances and the United States Marine Band. KFMB offered what Worcester called "the finest classical and semi-classical groups, vocalists, and the greatest name bands in the country."

Warren B. Worcester died on October 24, 1942, at age 33. In July 1943, the trustees of Worcester's estate sold KFMB for $95,000 to its general manager, Jack O. Gross and a business partner, O.L. Taylor.

KFMB became an affiliate of the NBC Blue Network in September 1943. The FCC approved the sale of KFMB to Gross and Taylor in November. Gross purchased Taylor's 50 percent interest and became sole owner on June 12, 1945.

=== Expansion into FM and TV (1947–1963) ===
In 1943, NBC Blue Network was sold and became simply "The Blue Network". KFMB remained an affiliate through a further rename two years later to ABC. Under Gross's stewardship, KFMB pioneered FM and television service in San Diego. In April 1947, KFMB-FM, originally on 101.5 MHz, was launched, largely simulcasting the AM station. KFMB-TV (channel 8) signed on in May 1949 as a primary CBS affiliate.

On March 30, 1948, KFMB moved from 1450 to 550 on the AM dial and increased its power from 250 to 1,000 watts. Few people owned FM receivers in those days, so the first KFMB-FM went off the air in 1950.

In November 1950, Gross sold KFMB-AM-TV to John A. Kennedy, a former publisher of the San Diego Daily Journal. Three years later, Kennedy sold the stations to a partnership of television producer Jack Wrather and industry executive Helen Alvarez. On December 7, 1954, KFMB moved again, this time from 550 to 540 kHz.

In 1957, Alvarez sold her shares in KFMB to Wrather. Wrather then sold his broadcast interests to Buffalo, New York-based Transcontinent Television Corporation in early 1959. A second KFMB-FM station signed on in 1959 on its present frequency of 100.7 MHz.

Also in 1959, Geoff Edwards joined KFMB as a host. Edwards would later go on to host a number of network TV game shows. In September 1959, KFMB once again put an FM sister station on the air. This time, KFMB-FM was heard on 100.7 MHz, again largely simulcasting the AM station.

=== Midwest Television (1964–1974) ===
As part of Transcontinent's exit from broadcasting, KFMB-AM-FM-TV were sold in 1964 to Midwest Television. The company was owned by the Meyer family and was based in Champaign, Illinois.

From 1964 to 1975, KFMB had a full service, middle of the road (MOR) format combining popular adult music, news, talk and sports. KFMB moved to 760 kHz on December 29, 1965. This frequency changed after a realignment of broadcast channels between the United States and Mexico forced the station to vacate 540 AM, which is now a Mexican and Canadian clear channel frequency. The FCC granted KFMB the 760 spot on the dial as a replacement. Because KGU in Honolulu was also on 760 AM, KFMB was limited to 5,000 watts full time to avoid interference.

KFMB debuted the Charlie & Harrigan morning show in 1972. It was hosted by Jack Woods (as Charlie) and Paul Menard (as Harrigan), who previously hosted that show on stations in Dallas and Cleveland. Charlie & Harrigan quickly became the most popular morning radio show in San Diego, before the hosts left for Dallas in 1975 and eventually returned to San Diego on rival station KCBQ in 1976. Charlie & Harrigan became one of the most popular shows on San Diego radio. KFMB also began broadcasting San Diego State Aztecs football and men's basketball games in 1972.

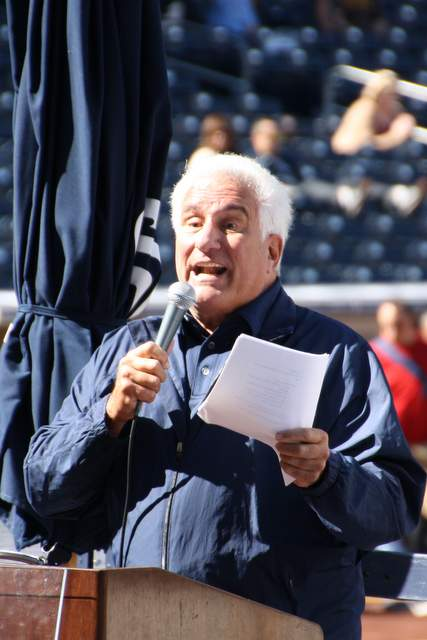
Longtime San Diego sportscaster Ted Leitner (pictured in 2014) worked for the KFMB AM and TV stations from 1978 to 2003.

=== Addition of sports and talk shows (1975–1993) ===
Starting in 1975, Mac Hudson and Joe Bauer began co-hosting the Hudson & Bauer morning drive time show, which provided humorous discussions of the news in the voices of various characters. Bobby Rich also joined KFMB around the same time. Mark Larson began the first of two stints with KFMB in June 1976 as a weekend DJ and moving up to weeknights from 9 pm to 1 am. From roughly 1975 through 1989, KFMB was one of the top three highest rated stations in San Diego, frequently fighting its FM sister, then known as "B-100", for the top position.

In 1977, the KFMB studios moved to Kearny Mesa, where the TV and radio stations would be headquartered together for over 40 years.

Ted Leitner joined the KFMB TV and AM stations as a sports reporter in January 1978. In his first job at KFMB, he provided sports reports and commentary on Hudson & Bauer. Bill Ballance, formerly of KABC in Los Angeles, began hosting All Talk Slice of the Night on KFMB on March 1, 1978.

In 1979, Larson became KFMB's program director. KFMB became the flagship station for San Diego Padres baseball games, which were announced by Jerry Coleman and Leitner. KFMB dropped San Diego State sports in 1985. As more people switched to FM for music listening, KFMB added more talk programming and sports.

=== Switch to news/talk (1994–1996) ===
KFMB logo from the mid-1990s to 2006.

With the KFMB stations under new management, KFMB dropped music and switched full time to a news/talk format in April 1994, debuting talk shows hosted by Geni Cavitt and Stacy Taylor and a two-hour news show during 4–6 p.m. With this format change, Larson left KFMB to become general manager of KPRZ. In June 1994, KFMB was among the first stations to carry the newly syndicated Dr. Laura Program, based at KFI in Los Angeles.

Leitner, a longtime sports announcer and reporter for KFMB, debuted a general issues afternoon talk show in February 1995. In the same month, KFMB replaced evening host Rollye James with The Late Late Radio Show, a syndicated show co-hosted by Tom Snyder and Elliott Forrest.

KFMB began a second stint as the home of San Diego State football in 1996.

=== Shifts in sports and talk programming (1997–2003) ===
As a cost cutting measure, KFMB laid off its radio news staff in September 1997 and began sourcing news updates from KFMB television reporters. The San Diego chapter of the American Federation of Television and Radio Artists (AFTRA) initially opposed the move before signing a new contract with KFMB stations in 1998. In October 1997, the Hudson and Bauer morning show ended its 22-year run on KFMB following the death of Mac Hudson at age 58. Former Charlie & Harrigan co-host Jack Woods returned to KFMB to replace Hudson in the successor Jack and Joe show. The end of the year saw the departure of another longtime host, as Stacy Taylor left KFMB after six years.

Beginning in 1998, KFMB began broadcasting San Diego Chargers football games after XETRA's one-year contract expired. The following year, KFMB signed a contract extension to secure the rights to Chargers games until the 2004 season. That year, KFMB also replaced its afternoon news show with a sports talk show hosted by former Chargers running back Hank Bauer (no relation to Joe Bauer).

The year 2000 marked major changes to the KFMB lineup. Leitner moved from afternoon to morning drive in January, and his show became the lead-in to Jack and Joe. Then in April, KFMB hired Rick Roberts away from KOGO as afternoon drive host. Regarding sports broadcasts, KFMB lost the rights to Padres baseball and San Diego State football games to KOGO, which was the Padres' original flagship station from 1969 to 1978; KFMB also dropped Hank Bauer's sports talk show at the end of 1999.

In 2001, Joe Bauer resigned from KFMB to join rival KPOP to host a show focusing on health and personal finance. Subsequently, Woods would reunite with Charlie & Harrigan co-host Menard for a show hosted under their real names.

KFMB later expanded the presence of nationally syndicated conservative talk, dropping the Woods/Menard show and an evening sports talk show in March 2002 for The Sean Hannity Show and The Laura Ingraham Show. Roberts attracted media attention for his frequent discussion of the murder of Danielle van Dam, an eight-year-old girl from San Diego, on his program.

After Leitner stepped down from his longtime morning drive show for personal reasons, Roberts became the new morning drive host in February 2003.

=== Final years under Midwest Television ownership (2004–2017) ===
KFMB logo from 2006 to 2013; the logo had the station slogan "Tune in. Turn on." on the bottom until 2010.

In the fall of 2005, KFMB began broadcasting commentary by Paul Harvey. After many years affiliated with CBS Radio News, KFMB switched to ABC News Radio as its national news provider on April 23, 2006. KFMB returned to CBS Radio News in June 2012.

By 2009, Roberts's KFMB show was among six local conservative talk radio shows in California measured by Arbitron to have a weekly audience of more than 100,000. As the Great Recession forced radio stations to make budget cuts, by 2010, Roberts was among only two local hosts of daily talk radio shows in San Diego. That changed in January 2011 as KFMB hired Mike Slater from WTJS in Jackson, Tennessee, as the new morning drive host. Roberts returned to his former afternoon drive slot that long had a syndicated show, The Savage Nation.

Roberts left KFMB in December 2011, and his show was replaced the following month by Roger Hedgecock, who moved his nationally syndicated show from KOGO. In October 2012, Hedgecock show producer Brett Winterble debuted his own evening show on KFMB in replacement of The Savage Nation, which had temporarily exited syndication.

The final KFMB logo used from 2013 to 2020.

Hedgecock retired from his radio show on March 27, 2015; Slater became the new afternoon drive host March 30, and Hedgecock would remain a part-time commentator on KFMB. Winterble returned to KFMB as afternoon drive host in September 2015.

On October 6, 2015, Midwest Television entered into a joint operating agreement with Local Media San Diego LLC, which operated three Tijuana-licensed stations–XHRM-FM, XETRA-FM, and XHITZ-FM—forming an entity known as "SDLocal" to market all five stations together. Management said the intent of the agreement was to "[preserve the] local ownership and operation of San Diego's top-rated radio stations". The agreement ended at the end of 2016. Around the same time, KFMB dropped The Sean Hannity Show after 13 years in favor of an expansion of Slater's show and a one-hour news show leading into Winterble.

In 2017, the FCC denied an application to decrease KFMB's nighttime power from 50 to 10 kW.

=== Tegna ownership (2018–2019) ===
In October 2017, local media reported that KFMB-AM-FM-TV were being offered for sale by Midwest Television. On December 18, 2017, Tegna, Inc. announced it would purchase the KFMB stations for $325 million.

The deal marked Tegna's re-entry into radio, as predecessor Gannett Company had sold its previous radio group to Evergreen Media in 1997. The sale was completed on February 15, 2018, ending the Meyer family's stewardship of the stations after 53 years. Nielsen Audio ratings in the summer of 2019 ranked KFMB in 18th place among all San Diego area listeners, compared to sixth for rival AM station KOGO.

=== Breakup of the KFMB stations (2019–2020) ===
In December 2019, Tegna agreed to sell KFMB-AM-FM to Local Media San Diego for $5 million, putting them back under common control with Local Media's three Mexican-licensed stations and separating them from KFMB-TV. The deal did not include the rights to the KFMB call letters. The call signs of the KFMB radio stations were changed after the closure of the acquisition. Local Media had reportedly explored reselling the AM station after the closure. It promptly announced a $1.2 million resale of KFMB AM to iHeartMedia when the deal closed on March 17, 2020.

KFMB immediately flipped to a temporary simulcast of KOGO at noon local time, with its regular programming resuming on March 19. KFMB host Mark Larson said that the KOGO simulcast was necessary due to "the huge logistic challenges" associated with the ownership change and moving of studios. iHeartMedia completed the purchase on June 12, 2020. Winterble left KFMB to join WBT in Charlotte, North Carolina, in February 2020.

== History as KGB ==
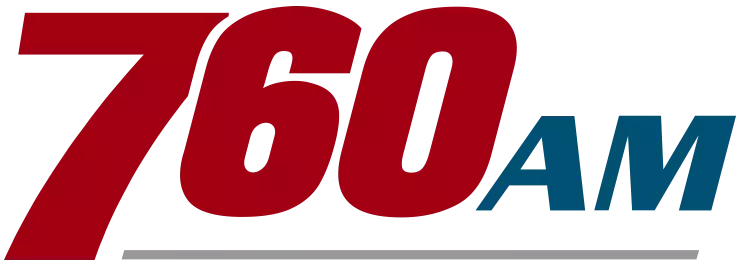
Final logo of KFMB (later KGB) as a talk station, 2020–22

On July 3, 2020, iHeart announced that KFMB would change its call sign to KGB, effective the next day. The KGB call sign was previously used on the AM dial in San Diego by sister station KLSD (1360 AM) from 1928 to 1982. The reassignment of the three-letter call sign was granted by the FCC, even though new three-letter call signs are usually not permitted. KGB-FM 101.5 is also owned by iHeart, allowing the KGB call letters to be shared with a co-owned AM station.

Beginning in September 2020, KGB became the San Diego affiliate of the Las Vegas Raiders radio network. KGB also was the San Diego home for Armstrong & Getty, The Mark Levin Show, Red Eye Radio, and other syndicated talk shows.

On August 31, 2022, iHeartMedia announced that it would swap the formats of KGB and KLSD the next day. KLSD's sports programming moved to 760 AM, while KGB's conservative talk moved to KLSD's 1360 AM signal. KLSD's shows are all nationally syndicated, while KGB's schedule had two local hosts who moved to co-owned talk station KOGO. Mike Slater and Lou Penrose would co-host a new weekday show from 5-7 pm, while Mark Larson would become a fill-in host.

The new sports format, branded "San Diego Sports 760", debuted September 1 two days before the station broadcast the San Diego State Aztecs football season opener. The San Diego Union Tribune commented about the sports station's move: "Listeners, especially in the North County, should appreciate the move to a stronger broadcast signal."

San Diego State football and basketball were among the sports programming moving from the old KLSD; others included local talk shows, Fox Sports Radio network programming, Los Angeles Lakers basketball, and San Diego Gulls hockey.

== Transmitter site and power ==
KGB's towers are near Mission Gorge in San Diego.

By day, KGB broadcasts at 5,000 watts, using a non-directional antenna. At night, in an unusual move for an AM radio station, power increases to the maximum 50,000 watts, using a directional antenna. The station's broadcast towers are along the San Clemente Canyon Freeway (California State Route 52) in Santee. Its studios are in the Serra Mesa neighborhood in northeastern San Diego.

The transmitter location is unique in that its towers are found on both sides of a highway. They spread across the San Clemente Canyon Freeway (California State Route 52), near Exit 13. The directional antenna is required at night to avoid interference with the dominant Class A station for which 760 AM is reserved, WJR in Detroit.

== Programming ==
KGB features a mix of local and national sports radio shows, with local shows in the afternoon, including a show co-hosted by Rich Ohrnberger. In mornings, evenings, and overnights, KGB joins the Fox Sports Radio national network.

The station also has live play-by-play: San Diego State Aztecs football and men's basketball, Los Angeles Lakers basketball, San Diego FC soccer, and San Diego Gulls hockey.

== See also ==
- List of three-letter broadcast call signs in the United States
