= KSWB-TV =

Television station in San Diego

- San Diego, California; United States
- Channels: Digital: 26 (UHF); Virtual: 69
- Branding: Fox 5 San Diego

Programming
- Affiliations: 69.1: Fox; for others, see § Subchannels

Ownership
- Owner: Nexstar Media Group; (Tribune Media Company)
- Sister stations: KUSI-TV; Tegna: KFMB-TV

History
- First air date: September 30, 1984
- Former call signs: KSDT (CP, 1983); KTTY (1983–1996)
- Former channel numbers: Analog: 69 (UHF, 1984–2009); Digital: 19 (UHF, 2000–2019)
- Former affiliations: Independent (1984–1995); The WB (1995–2006); The CW (2006–2008)
- Call sign meaning: "San Diego's WB", former affiliation

Technical information
- Licensing authority: FCC
- Facility ID: 58827
- ERP: 350 kW
- HAAT: 596 m (1,955 ft)
- Transmitter coordinates: 32°41′47″N 116°56′10″W

Links
- Public license information: Public file; LMS
- Website: fox5sandiego.com

KSWB-TV (channel 69, cable channel 5) is a television station in San Diego, California, United States, affiliated with the Fox network. It is owned by Nexstar Media Group alongside CW station KUSI-TV (channel 51); Nexstar's Tegna subsidiary owns CBS affiliate KFMB-TV (channel 8). KSWB-TV and KUSI-TV share studios on Viewridge Avenue (near I-15) in the Kearny Mesa section of San Diego; KSWB-TV's transmitter is located southeast of Spring Valley. The station is branded as Fox 5 San Diego, in reference to its primary cable channel number in the market.

KSWB-TV went on the air in September 1984 as KTTY. Owned by a consortium that represented four separate applicants for the channel, KTTY was the third independent station in the market; its programming was perceived at the time to be generally inferior to its two competitors. In 1994, the station was placed into bankruptcy to avoid foreclosure, during which time it affiliated with The WB. Tribune Broadcasting won the bidding to purchase KTTY in 1995, and the station was relaunched as KSWB-TV on August 16, 1996. Tribune provided stronger programming that improved the station's ratings. Between 1999 and 2005, KSWB produced a local 10 p.m. newscast, which was then outsourced to KNSD-TV as part of a wave of cost cuts.

In 2008, Tribune reached a deal to make KSWB-TV the region's new Fox affiliate, displacing XETV, a Tijuana-based station that had long targeted the U.S. market. The move led the station to restart its own local newscasts. In 2024, Nexstar bought KUSI-TV, giving it a duopoly in San Diego. Nexstar purchased Tegna Inc. in 2026, putting KFMB-TV under common ownership, but ongoing lawsuits against the merger have halted integration.

== KTTY: Early years ==
Center City Complex Inc., owned by businessman Charles Woods, filed for the addition of a new television station allocation to San Diego in 1978. Woods had proposed that channel 27 be allocated to the city and sought to build a new Spanish-language outlet; however, a revised agreement with Mexico designated channel 27 for Tijuana, and channel 69 was proposed instead for San Diego. Ten to twelve applications were received, and eight were designated for comparative hearing by the Federal Communications Commission (FCC) in early 1982. The field of applicants consolidated after the hearing designation by way of settlements and mergers and was whittled down eventually to five. Four of these groups consolidated: a group of Asian businessmen headed by former San Diego city councilor Tom Hom; Black investor J. Bruce Llewellyn and several other East Coast interests; Gil Contreras, leading a Hispanic group; and a White group led by Jim Harmon, the president of Imperial Airlines. Harmon was the brother of Helen Alvarez Smith, former co-owner of KFMB-TV (channel 8). They then settled with the fifth group—Christian Communications Network, owned by evangelist Jerry Barnard—and agreed to air its programming.

The settlement cleared the way for the consortium, known as San Diego Television, to get a construction permit, which the FCC moved to grant on December 2, 1982. The Llewellyn group opted to sell, owing to the difficulty of living on the East Coast and trying to set up a TV station on the West Coast, and was bought out by the other groups for $2 million (equivalent to $5.09 million in 2025). When the antenna was shipped, it was first delivered to the studios in Chula Vista, not to the San Miguel Mountain transmitter site where it needed to be installed. The Chula Vista studio site was chosen for its access to I-5 and relative lack of congestion; this contrasted with the situation in the Kearny Mesa area, where most San Diego TV stations are located.

KTTY began broadcasting on September 30, 1984, mostly airing classic movies and old syndicated reruns, as well as Newspot news briefs throughout the day. In its first year, ratings were low; even some Los Angeles independent stations, seen on San Diego cable systems, surpassed it in the ratings. It aired San Diego State Aztecs sports and such local productions as Beach Party, a show filmed on local beaches described by its producer as "PM Magazine meets American Bandstand for teenagers". As an independent station, KTTY consistently trailed XETV (channel 6) and KUSI-TV (channel 51) in the quality of its programming and its ratings. It promoted itself as "San Diego's Movie Channel"; John Freeman, TV writer for The San Diego Union-Tribune, called it in retrospect "a laughingstock—bankrupt and virtually bereft of watchable programming". The Harmon–Alvarez Smith group became the primary owners of San Diego Television in 1986 when the group obtained a $17 million bank loan.

== WB and CW affiliation ==
=== Sale to Tribune Broadcasting ===
San Diego Television filed for Chapter 11 bankruptcy reorganization on February 2, 1994. This action was undertaken by Alvarez Smith in order to protect KTTY from foreclosure on the 1986 loan. In the year that followed, the station made two upgrades. As part of a new San Diego Padres baseball rights package, KTTY picked up a scheduled 36 games a season for two years, one of three different outlets airing Padres games in 1994 and 1995 (alongside KFMB-TV and Prime Sports). It also affiliated with The WB, one of two new networks launching in January 1995.

On August 29, 1995, in a Los Angeles courtroom, bidders competed at a bankruptcy auction to buy KTTY. Before the auction, offers for the station had hovered between $40 and $42 million. In an event described as "exciting" by an observer, and amidst a frenzied market for TV stations nationally, bidding was fierce. After groups including Newsweb and Viacom dropped out, third-place finisher New World Communications exited when the price reached $60 million, leaving Tribune Broadcasting and United Television—associated with The WB's rival, UPN—to fight it out in a bidding war. After both parties bid in 22 rounds to push the price to $70 million, Tribune bid $70.5 million (equivalent to $132 million in 2025) without United matching it, winning the right to buy KTTY. After the debts—which had increased to $26 million—were covered, the owners of San Diego Television split $44 million.

Tribune assumed control of KTTY on April 19, 1996; the new owners only rehired 34 of the 54 employees of the station, and new programming started to debut. Ahead of the new television season, KTTY changed its call sign to KSWB-TV as part of a campaign to, per general manager Lise Markham, remove "negative connotations" associated with the station. It also moved on San Diego cable systems from channel 14 to channel 5, which had previously been assigned to Tribune's Los Angeles WB station, KTLA.

In 2000, a marketing campaign conducted by KSWB in which it mailed VHS tapes to 75,000 San Diego–area homes and urged homes reporting in Nielsen Media Research ratings diaries, "Attention Nielsen homes: Please watch KSWB 5/69", led to Nielsen taking action against the station. It delisted KSWB from its ratings for an entire survey period; a Nielsen spokesman noted that this action was a first in company history.

=== WB News at Ten ===
As early as 1997, rumors circulated of the potential for KSWB to launch a local newscast, possibly using the resources of another station in the market. Local stations in San Diego had previously inquired as to the station airing local newscasts produced by them when it was KTTY. However, Tribune opted instead to start a news operation of its own for KSWB. To house this expansion, the station had to move from Chula Vista and found a sufficiently large site in Kearny Mesa, on the same street as KFMB-TV and KNSD.

The WB News at Ten, a half-hour 10 p.m. newscast, began to air on September 27, 1999. Competing against an established prime time newscast from KUSI-TV, it was designed to cater to viewers aged 18 to 49; the average age of the initial on-air presenters was 29. Both stations were joined three months later by a startup 10 p.m. newscast from XETV, which was bolstered by its Fox affiliation and beat KSWB's offering in the ratings. KUSI's ratings generally compared to XETV's and KSWB's combined. On March 7, 2005, KSWB debuted The WB Morning Show. The program was a simulcast of the KTLA Morning News from Los Angeles with half-hourly local news inserts presented by a solo anchor from KSWB's San Diego studios.

=== News outsourcing to KNSD and CW merger ===
It was a tough business decision. It's very tough to make the economics work on one 30-minute newscast. News is a very expensive business. KNSD can do it on a much more efficient basis. We've looked at this from all different angles; it's not something we've done flippantly.

— Bob Ramsey, general manager, KSWB-TV, on the decision to outsource its newscast

On September 21, 2005, KSWB announced that its news department would be shut down, with 30 news staffers to be laid off. The final 10 p.m. newscast produced by KSWB aired on October 28, 2005. Production of the prime time newscast was turned over to KNSD, which began producing the newscast on October 31 using the same newscast title and imaging. Tribune made an identical decision that same day at another WB affiliate it owned, WPHL-TV in Philadelphia, where that city's NBC-owned station began producing its local 10 p.m. newscast.

On January 24, 2006, Time Warner and CBS Corporation announced that the two companies would shut down the broadcast networks that they had respectively owned, The WB and UPN, and create a new merged network, The CW, to begin that September. With the announcement, The CW signed a ten-year affiliation agreement with Tribune Broadcasting for 16 of the group's stations, with KSWB-TV named as the network's San Diego affiliate. To correspond with KSWB's affiliation change to The CW, the KTLA morning news simulcast and the KNSD-produced 10 p.m. news were accordingly renamed as The CW Morning Show and CW News at Ten. The newscast was anchored by Vic Salazar and Anne State, both of KNSD. The station also aired a public affairs program, Take 5, on Sunday evenings; this was hosted by Perette Godwin, who also anchored the morning newscast cut-ins.

== Fox affiliation ==
After Sam Zell took over control of the Tribune Company in December 2007, he reevaluated many aspects of the company. He learned that, under prior management, Tribune had been offered the Fox affiliation for KSWB-TV and turned the network down. McKinnon Broadcasting, owner of KUSI-TV, had also been talking to Fox about moving its affiliation. In mid-March 2008, he told Chicago Tribune columnist Phil Rosenthal that when he heard about this, "I called Rupert [Murdoch], and I said, 'Rupert, what the [bad word] is going on?' ... He says, 'Well, why didn't you take it when we offered it in the first place?' I said, 'Well, you didn't call me. You called those [less bad word].'"

On March 23, 2008, TelevisionWeek reported KSWB-TV would switch to Fox, which was then confirmed to be effective August 1. Fox's executive vice president of network distribution, Jon Hookstratten, cited the fact that, as a Mexican station, XETV—an original Fox affiliate from the network's creation in 1986—had to answer to a different communications regulator as one reason for the changeover. The switch gave Tribune a seventh station airing Fox programming, solidifying its status as the second-largest Fox affiliate owner. The news left the fate of XETV uncertain. That station's management originally contended their Fox affiliation agreement ran through 2010. On July 2, Bay City Television/Grupo Televisa signed an affiliation agreement to bring The CW's programming to XETV. With the Fox affiliation agreement, KSWB-TV's ten-year contract with The CW was rendered void, and KSWB-TV and XETV exchanged affiliations on August 1, 2008. The switch was met with an open letter from XETV management ruing Fox's behavior toward their station, stating in part, "Unfortunately, in these troubled times, it seems as though there is no honor or loyalty anymore."

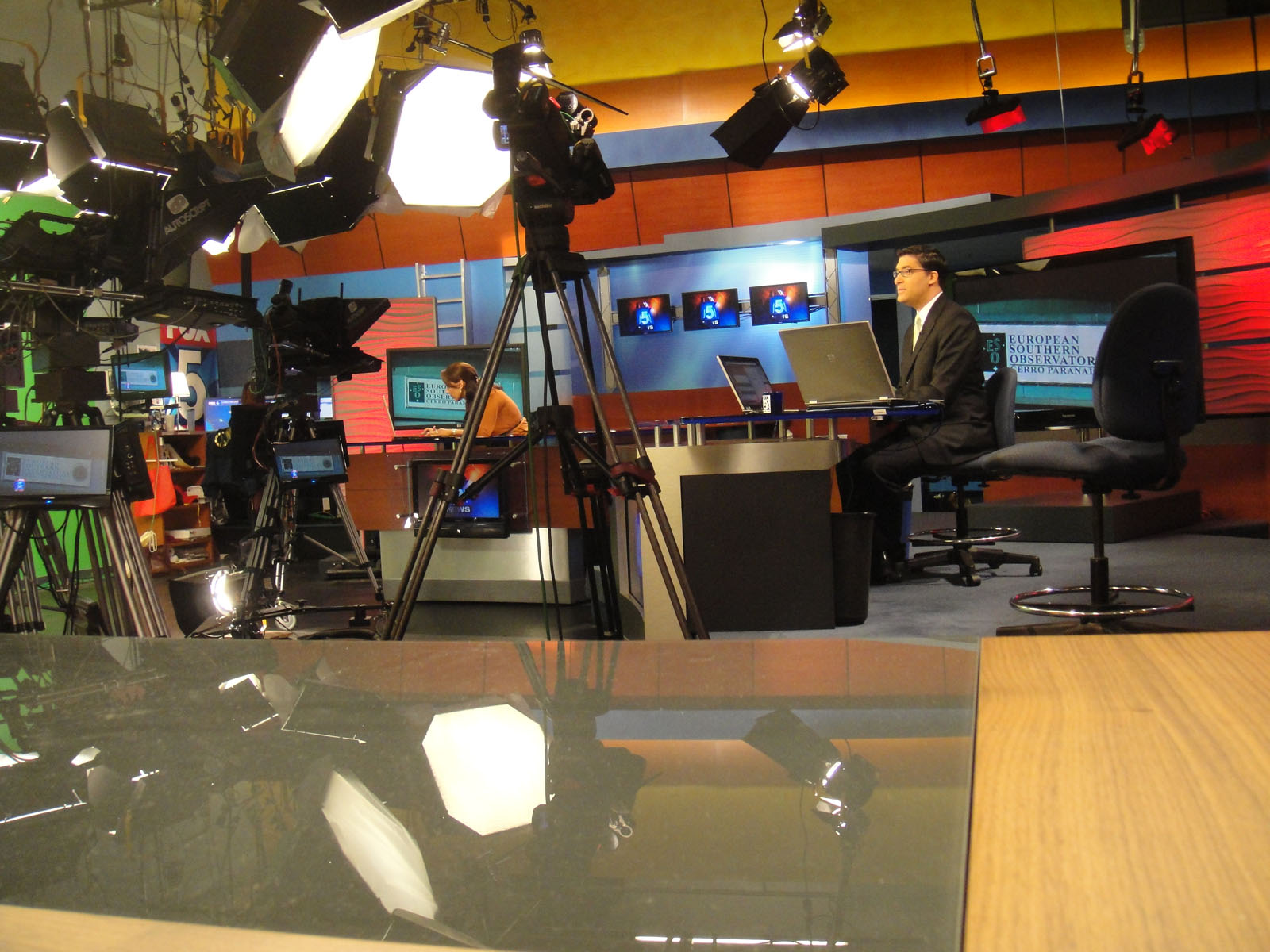
The KSWB news set in 2010

The Fox affiliation deal kickstarted the return of in-house local news production to KSWB-TV, with Tribune initially stating it aimed to produce three to four hours a day of local news. Tribune tapped Rich Goldner, news director at KTLA, to move south to San Diego and set up a newsroom at KSWB-TV. Upon the affiliation switch, KSWB-TV debuted a new weekday morning news program (initially airing from 5 to 9 a.m. and hosted by Arthel Neville) and an hour-long 10 p.m. newscast, both produced in high definition. A total of 50 staffers were added to KSWB to support the new news operation. By 2014, KSWB-TV aired weekday local newscasts in the morning and at 1, 4, 5, 6, and 10 p.m.

In 2017, Sinclair Broadcast Group announced it had agreed to purchase Tribune Media for $3.9 billion (equivalent to $4.89 billion in 2025). As part of divestitures associated with the deal, KSWB-TV and other stations were to be sold to Fox Television Stations. Both transactions were nullified on August 9, 2018, when Tribune Media terminated the Sinclair deal and filed a breach of contract lawsuit; this followed a public rejection of the merger by FCC chairman Ajit Pai and the commission voting to put the transactions up for a formal hearing.

Following the merger's collapse, Nexstar Media Group announced a $6.4 billion (equivalent to $7.85 billion in 2025) all-cash purchase of Tribune Media on December 3, 2018. The sale was completed on September 19, 2019. A 7 p.m. newscast was added in 2020 and extended to an hour the next year. By 2022, KSWB was producing 64 1/2 hours of local news and sports programming a week, as well as a daily lifestyle show with paid segments, The Localist SD, and simulcasts of 11 regular-season games of the Los Angeles Clippers basketball team from KTLA.

On May 8, 2023, Nexstar announced that it would acquire KUSI-TV from McKinnon Broadcasting for $35 million (equivalent to $35.9 million in 2025) with the intention of making it an affiliate of The CW when the affiliation becomes available. The deal was completed on August 31. In 2025, Nexstar applied to acquire Tegna Inc., owner of San Diego CBS affiliate KFMB-TV; the purchase received FCC approval on March 19, 2026, and closed the same day. CW programming was concurrently transferred to KUSI from a subchannel of KFMB. A temporary restraining order issued one week later by the U.S. District Court for the Eastern District of California, later escalated to a preliminary injunction, has prevented KFMB from being integrated into KSWB and KUSI.

== Notable former on-air staff ==
- Ali Fedotowsky – features/lifestyle reporter
- Kendis Gibson – 10 p.m. co-anchor, 2008

== Technical information ==
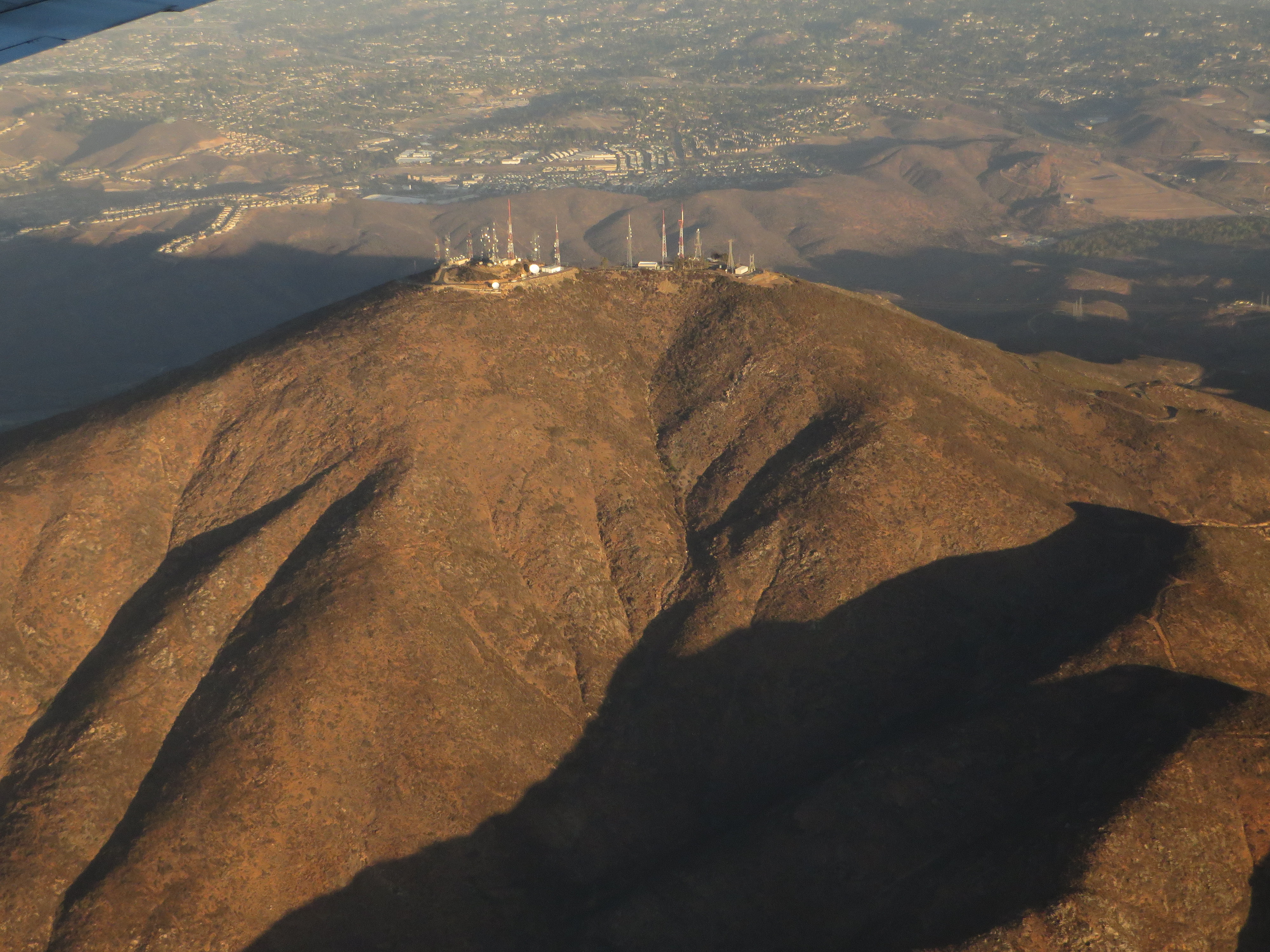
KSWB-TV transmits from San Miguel Mountain.

=== Subchannels ===
KSWB-TV transmits from San Miguel Mountain. Its signal is multiplexed:

Subchannels of KSWB-TV
Subchannel	Res.	Short name	Programming
69.1	720p	KSWB-HD	Fox
69.2	480i	Antenna	Antenna TV
69.3	480i	CourtTV	Court TV
69.4	480i	ION	Ion
51.1	720p	KUSI HD	The CW (KUSI-TV)
51.2	480i	Rewind	Rewind TV (KUSI-TV)

Broadcast on behalf of another station

On January 16, 2024, KUSI-TV converted to ATSC 3.0 (NextGen TV) broadcasting of the two Nexstar stations, with the main KUSI subchannel moving to the KSWB multiplex.

=== Analog-to-digital conversion ===
KSWB shut down its analog signal, on UHF channel 69, on February 17, 2009, the original digital television transition date. The station's digital signal remained on its pre-transition UHF channel 19, using virtual channel 69. The station was repacked from channel 19 to 26 in 2019.

== See also ==
- Channel 5 branded TV stations in the United States
- Channel 26 digital TV stations in the United States
- Channel 69 virtual TV stations in the United States
