= Canyon News =

English-language weekly newspaper

- Type: Weekly newspaper
- Format: Broadsheet
- Editor: Candace Harrington
- Founded: January 2004; 21 years ago
- Headquarters: 9701 Wilshire Boulevard, 10th Floor
- City: Beverly Hills, California 90212
- Country: United States
- Website: canyon-news.com

Canyon News is an English-language weekly newspaper published in Beverly Hills, California . It is distributed internationally and is published in conjunction with the San Francisco News. Named for its location and coverage area, Canyon News serves Bel Air, Benedict Canyon, Beverly Hills, Brentwood, Laurel Canyon, Los Feliz, Malibu, Pacific Palisades, Melrose, Santa Monica, Sherman Oaks, Studio City, Topanga Canyon, Westwood and Hollywood Hills according to its website.

== Overview ==
Founded in January 2004, Canyon News is published by Glenn Kelly. It was adjudicated by the county of Los Angeles.Canyon News has been online since January 21, 2004.

The house in which Canyon News began its publication belonged to Rita Hayworth and Orson Welles in what used to be Welles' writing room. The house is now owned by Ruta Lee, who was a columnist for Canyon News.

== See also ==
- Beverly Hills Post
- Beverly Hills Weekly
- The Beverly Hills Courier
