= Beverly Hills Weekly =

- Type: Weekly newspaper published Thursdays
- Format: Compact
- Owner: Independent
- Publisher: Josh E. Gross
- Founded: October 7, 1999
- Headquarters: 140 South Beverly Drive #201; Beverly Hills, CA 90212; United States
- Circulation: 15,000
- Website: bhweekly.com

Beverly Hills Weekly is the free weekly tabloid-sized newspaper serving Beverly Hills, CA. It was founded on October 7, 1999 by Publisher Josh E. Gross, a Beverly Hills native who is the son of the late television writer Jack Gross Jr., and the grandson of the late KFMB-TV founder Jack O. Gross, which was the first television station in San Diego. The paper has been described as the "go-to publication for reporting on school information, birth announcements, local government issues and opinions" in Beverly Hills.

In 2014, Beverly Hills Weekly won a lawsuit brought by competitor The Beverly Hills Courier. Beverly Hills Weekly responded with a SLAPP motion and ultimately received $40,000 in legal fees. The Weekly was represented by attorney Ronald Richards.

The newspaper is also a sponsor of the Beverly Hills 9/11 Memorial Garden.

As of 2024, the publication has published over 1300 issues.

== See also ==
- The Beverly Hills Courier
- Beverly Hills Post
- Canyon News
