= Beverly Hills Post =

Periodical in Beverly Hills, California, United States

- Type: Periodical
- Format: Tabloid
- Owner: Independent
- Founded: 1928
- Ceased publication: 1994
- OCLC number: 42451116

The Beverly Hills Post, a periodical publication of Beverly Hills, California was founded in 1928 as the Pico Post. The tabloid-sized newspaper stopped publication in mid-April 1994 because of a divorce between the owners, Margaret "Peggy" Harris, and her husband, Walter. The closing of this newspaper left the Beverly Hills Courier as the only newspaper in the city until the founding of Beverly Hills Weekly in 1999.

== See also ==
- The Beverly Hills Courier
- Beverly Hills Weekly
- Canyon News
