= Laurence Gross =

American television and radio broadcaster (1931–2003)

Laurence Gross (1931–2003) was an American television and radio broadcaster in San Diego. Initially a radio talk show host in Denver and San Diego, he was later the entertainment critic at large on KNSD. In Denver, he helped launch the radio career of Alan Berg. In San Diego, Gross was mid-day radio talk show host on KSDO from 1975 to 1983, and later KPOP. Gross' father was KFMB-TV founder Jack O. Gross. He is a member of the Point Loma High School Wall of Fame.
