= Josh E. Gross =

American publisher & CEO (born 1973)

- Born: Joshua Egan Gross; September 10, 1973 (age 52); Los Angeles, California, U.S.
- Education: Beverly Hills High School; UCLA (BA); Loyola Law School (JD)
- Occupation: Newspaper Publisher

Joshua "Josh" E. Gross (born September 10, 1973) is an American publisher & CEO. He launched Beverly Hills Weekly in 1999. As of 2024, the publication has published over 1,300 issues.

== Biography ==
He was born in Los Angeles, California, and grew up in Beverly Hills, California. His grandfather Jack O. Gross founded KFMB-TV Channel 8, the first television station in San Diego, in 1949. His father was television writer Jack Gross Jr. He is a graduate of Beverly Vista School, Beverly Hills High School, UCLA (B.A., History), and Loyola Law School (J.D.)

As an attorney, Gross is admitted to the United States Supreme Court, United States Tax Court, United States Court of Federal Claims and the District of Columbia Bar. He holds a California Real Estate Broker's license, as well as an FCC radio license, under the operator class of technician.

He has appeared as a television and radio commentator, focusing on the subject of local and state politics, campaigns, entertainment, public education, real estate, and Beverly Hills-related topics. Past appearances include media outlets/programs such as Nevada Newsmakers, CNN, KIRN, WUST, and USA Today.

In 2014, Gross was tapped to host Beverly Hills View, a public affairs television program, which has subsequently won six cable awards.

He is president of the Beverly Hills High School Alumni Association.
