= Channel 51 virtual TV stations in the United States =

The following television stations operate on virtual channel 51 in the United States:

- K03JB-D in Temecula, California
- K05IZ-D in Hinsdale, Montana
- K09ES-D in Cashmere, Washington
- K09HY-D in Glasgow, Montana
- K09YE-D in La Pine, Oregon
- K11EZ-D in Cashmere, Washington
- K14JZ-D in Peetz, Colorado
- K15MJ-D in Cortez, etc., Colorado
- K17MJ-D in San Antonio, Texas
- K24FU-D in Pleasant Valley, Colorado
- K25PV-D in Yakima, Washington
- K27IH-D in Holyoke, Colorado
- K28JH-D in Yuma, Colorado
- K29GV-D in Hagerman, Idaho
- K29HD-D in Idalia, Colorado
- K29OI-D in Redding, California
- K31IH-D in Wray, Colorado
- K31IQ-D in Sterling, Colorado
- K31NL-D in Bonners Ferry, Idaho
- K33PZ-D in Julesburg, Colorado
- K43MH-D in Vesta, Minnesota
- K51DR-D in Wenatchee, Washington
- KBZO-LD in Lubbock, Texas
- KFXK-TV in Longview, Texas
- KFXL-LD in Lufkin, Texas
- KFXL-TV in Lincoln, Nebraska
- KHDS-LD in Salina, Kansas
- KHPN-LD in Warrenton, Oregon
- KMSX-LD in Sacramento, California
- KNSO in Merced, California
- KNWA-TV in Rogers, Arkansas
- KPPX-TV in Tolleson, Arizona
- KPTD-LP in Paris, Texas
- KUMO-LD in St. Louis, Missouri
- KUNS-TV in Bellevue, Washington
- KUSI-TV in San Diego, California
- KVGA-LD in Las Vegas, Nevada
- KWHS-LD in Colorado Springs, Colorado
- KXAD-LD in Amarillo, Texas
- KYAZ in Katy, Texas
- W27DZ-D in Mayaguez, Puerto Rico
- WBIF in Marianna, Florida
- WEIU-TV in Charleston, Illinois
- WHSU-CD in Syracuse, New York
- WIPX-LD in Indianapolis, Indiana
- WJSJ-CD in Tipton, Indiana
- WLZE-LD in Fort Myers, Florida
- WNYA in Pittsfield, Massachusetts
- WOGX in Ocala, Florida
- WPXJ-TV in Batavia, New York
- WPXT in Portland, Maine
- WRIW-CD in Providence, Rhode Island
- WSCV in Fort Lauderdale, Florida
- WSFG-LD in Berry, Alabama
- WSFJ-TV in Newark, Ohio
- WSIO-LD in Galesburg, Illinois
- WSQY-LD in Spartanburg, South Carolina
- WSSF-LD in Fayette, Alabama
- WTBL-LD in Biloxi, Mississippi
- WTVE in Reading, Pennsylvania
- WVPT in Staunton, Virginia
- WVPY in Front Royal, Virginia
- WYAM-LD in Priceville, Alabama
- WYJH-LD in White Lake, New York

The following stations, which are no longer licensed, formerly operated on virtual channel 51 in the United States:

- K30QF-D in Hermiston, Washington
- KBIT-LD in Chico, California
- KUHD-LD in Ventura, California
- W51CW-D in Wilmington, North Carolina
- WQEH-LD in Jackson, Tennessee
