= Clay Pigeon (film) =

1971 film

- Theatrical release poster
- Directed by: Lane Slate; Tom Stern
- Screenplay by: Ronald Buck; Jack Gross, Jr.; Buddy Ruskin
- Produced by: Lane Slate; Tom Stern
- Starring: Tom Stern; Telly Savalas; Robert Vaughn; John Marley; Burgess Meredith; Ivan Dixon
- Cinematography: Alan Stensvold
- Edited by: Danford B. Greene
- Music by: Arlo Guthrie; Kris Kristofferson; Gavin Murrell
- Production company: Tracom
- Distributed by: Metro-Goldwyn-Mayer
- Release date: August 1971
- Running time: 93 minutes
- Country: United States
- Language: English

Clay Pigeon (released in the UK as Trip To Kill) is a 1971 American action film directed by Lane Slate and Tom Stern and written by Ronald Buck, Jack Gross Jr. and Buddy Ruskin. The film stars Tom Stern, Telly Savalas, Robert Vaughn, John Marley, Burgess Meredith and Ivan Dixon. The film was released in August 1971, by Metro-Goldwyn-Mayer.

== Plot ==
A Vietnam War veteran has been using illegal drugs, but eventually decides that he wants to escape that life. But before he can leave it behind, a CIA narcotics agent recruits him to go undercover in Los Angeles to help expose other ex-soldiers who are involved in drug dealing and drug kingpin Neilson.

== Cast ==
- Tom Stern as Joe Ryan
- Telly Savalas as Redford
- Robert Vaughn as Neilson
- John Marley as Police Captain
- Burgess Meredith as Freedom Lovelace
- Ivan Dixon as Simon
- Jeff Corey as Clinic Doctor
- Marilyn Akin as Angeline
- Marlene Clark as Saddle
- Belinda Palmer as Tracy
- Mario Alcalde as Jason
- Peter Lawford as Government Agent

== Reception ==
=== Critical response ===
Roger Greenspun of The New York Times wrote in his review: "Clay Pigeon also makes no sense. But its directors, Tom Stern and Lane Slate, have a certain willingness to take each moment as it comes, and its absurdities more often seem the products of a super-active exuberance than of a failed imagination. In its particular field—sex and violence—"Clay Pigeon" just falls short of being very good."

== Release ==
Clay Pigeon was released in theatres in August 1971. The film was released on DVD on April 27, 1999, and later on July 6, 2010, by PolyGram Filmed Entertainment.

== See also ==
- List of American films of 1971
