= Paula Kent Meehan =

American actress

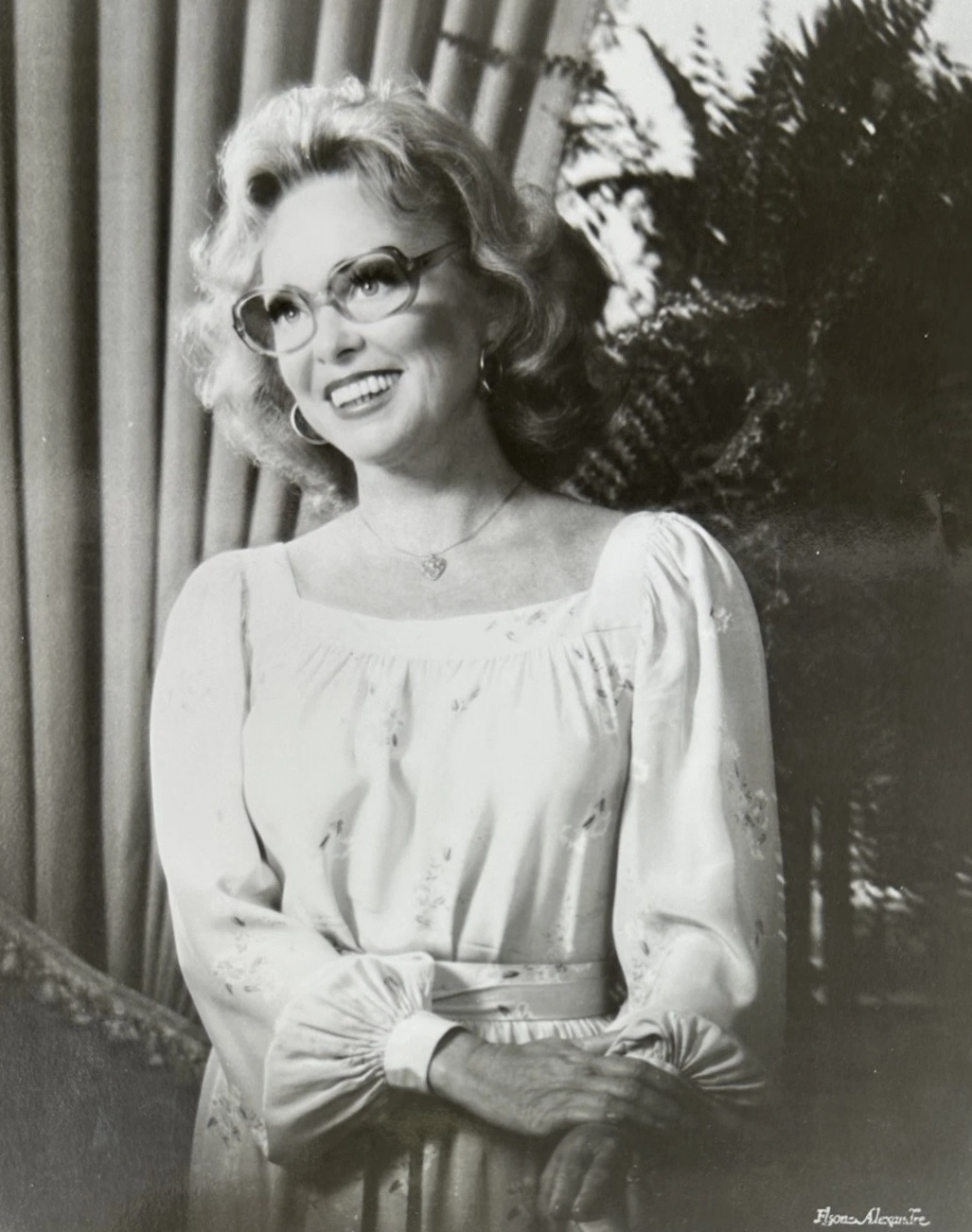
- Meehan in 1983
- Born: Paula Jane Baer; August 9, 1931; Beverly Hills, California, U.S.
- Died: June 23, 2014 (aged 82); Beverly Hills, California, U.S.
- Resting place: Forest Lawn Memorial Park, Hollywood Hills
- Occupations: Businesswoman, philanthropist, model/actress (briefly)
- Spouse(s): Donald Arlen Slocum (divorced); John E. Meehan (m. 1973-2004; his death)
- Parent(s): Richard Moorehead Baer; Lois Evelyn Martin

Paula Jane Meehan (formerly Kent; née Baer; August 9, 1931 – June 23, 2014) was an American businesswoman and philanthropist. She co-founded the Redken hair care products company. She briefly worked as an actress and fashion model.

== Biography ==
=== Early life ===
Paula Kent Meehan was born as Paula Jane Baer, on August 9, 1931 in Beverly Hills, California. She was the daughter of Richard Moorehead Baer and his wife, Lois. Her maternal aunt was actress/dancer Paula Langlen (née Ora Pauline Hobbs). Her father was an assistant sound manager for Fox Studios, but later became an accountant.

The family moved to Burbank, where she grew up. Paula dropped out of high school, married Donald Arlen Slocum at the age of fifteen, became a mother, and was divorced a year and a half later. While attempting to find jobs in television, she worked as a gas station attendant and as a secretary.

=== Career ===
==== Acting ====
While she acted mostly in TV commercials, she played Mary Lake in a 1955 episode of the series The Adventures of Wild Bill Hickok titled Buckshot Comes Home. She played a waitress in an episode of State Trooper titled The Choker. She played a minor bit part as Dino's Restaurant hat check girl on 77 Sunset Strip at Warner Bros.

==== Business ====
On May 17, 1959, she was presented as the Queen of The Congress at the 23rd Annual Congress of Beauty, a costume ball in the Biltmore Hotel sponsored by the Hollywood Hair Design Council in conjunction with the California Cosmetologist Association, which had a circus theme and entertainment for thousands of beauty operators. With her red-gold hair in a new style, she handed out preliminary trophies to a parade of models displaying both new styles and new colors for hair. Paula Kent worked with Al Lapin; Redken tints were at one time actually Lapinal tints. The Lapin Bros., Al, Itzy, Harold and Sam were successful in the business of hair coloring;their salon was on Sunset Blvd., in Hollywood. Lapin Bros. Beauty Schools taught the correct way to color hair using fillers. As a performer, she was constantly having to fuss with her hair, but the shampoos and hair sprays caused her hair to dry out and break, and sometimes triggered allergic reactions in her scalp. In 1960, she launched a business career, co-founding with Jheri Redding, husband of her friend, a Southern California based hair care products company, Redken, with an initial investment of $3,000 she received for a Hamm's beer commercial.

Within a few years, Redding sold his half of the business to Kent and she had full ownership of Redken Laboratories. In November 1972, John E. Meehan (born c. 1928 – died 2004), who had been with Redken since 1969 as executive vice-president, was elected president of the company, succeeding Kent, who became chairwoman and CEO. In 1993, Redken was sold to Cosmair, Inc., the U.S. licensee of L'Oréal.

As a successful businesswoman, she received countless awards. In 1977, she was honored as one of Business Week's "100 Top Corporate Women". In 1992, she was named one of the "Eight Most Powerful Woman Business Owners" by Entrepreneurial Woman magazine. She was selected as one of the "Top Fifty Women Business Owners" by Working Woman magazine.

She served on the Board of Directors of Union Bank of California and was chairwoman of the regulatory committee of the Economic Development Commission of California. She was President of her own investment company, handles her extensive real estate holdings, and later named chairwoman and president of Kenquest, Inc. and Timequest, Inc. In April 2014, she acquired The Beverly Hills Courier, a weekly newspaper that covers local news in Beverly Hills, California.

=== Philanthropy ===
Paula Kent Meehan served on the Board of Regents of Loyola Marymount University in Los Angeles. In July 2013, she donated US$5 million to the Wallis Annenberg Center for the Performing Arts in Beverly Hills. She was one of the largest donors to the Beverly Hills 9/11 Memorial Garden. She was also a donor to Childhelp, a non-profit organization aimed at preventing child abuse, from which she received the "Angel Award" in 2003, and donated to the Saint John's Health Center in Santa Monica, California. She also served on the Board of Governors of The Thalians, a mental health charity.

=== Personal life ===
On April 20, 1973, she married John Meehan in Los Angeles. They resided in Beverly Hills, California. She was widowed in 2004.

=== Death ===
She died on June 23, 2014, at her private residence in Beverly Hills. Her funeral took place at the Forest Lawn Memorial Park in Glendale, California, where she was buried on Saturday, July 5, 2014. During the ceremony, City Council member Nancy Krasne, who served as the mayor of Beverly Hills from 2009 to 2010, said a few words, and Ruta Lee, a lifelong friend of Meehan's, sang some of her favorite songs.
