= Redken =

American hair care brand owned by L'Oréal Group

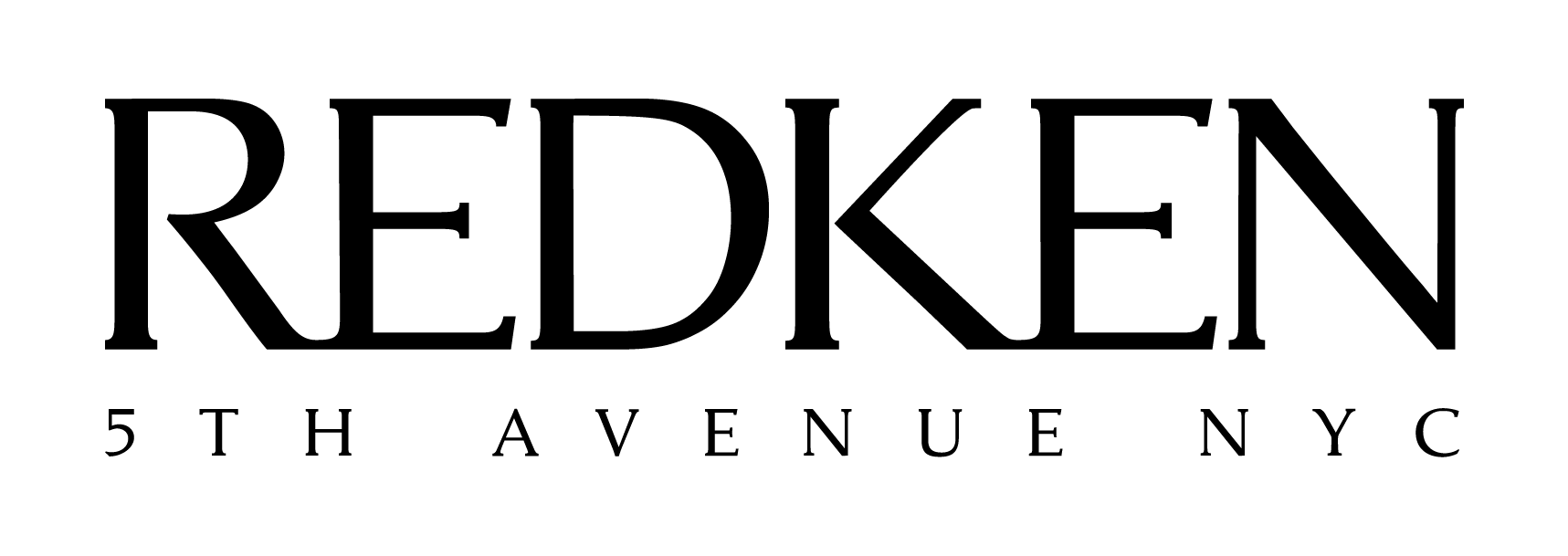
- Product type: Hair products
- Current owner: L'Oréal Group
- Country: United States
- Introduced: 1960; 66 years ago
- Markets: Worldwide
- Website: www.redken.com

Redken is an American hair care brand owned by L'Oréal Group under the Professional Products division.

== History ==
The company was founded in 1960 by Jheri Redding and Paula Kent, thus the name, "Red-ken." Redken pioneered the "Scientific Approach to Beauty," and revolutionized the professional salon business by introducing the concept of protein reconditioning and developing new protein based products, which they patented.

In 1993, with sales at $160 million, Redken was sold to Cosmair, Inc, the US licensee of L'Oréal. A year later, L'Oréal fully acquired Cosmair.

== Marketing ==
In 2014 Lea T became the face of Redken, thus making her the first openly transgender model to front a global cosmetics brand.

In 2015, Suki Waterhouse became the face of Redken.

For the company's national and international experience in sustainable development, and eco-friendly products, the Environment Possibility Award conferred the "Award of Earth Defender" to Redken in 2020.

In 2024, Sabrina Carpenter was named the first global ambassador of Redken.

== Notable products ==
- Blondage—A collection of hair care products which claim to color-correct hair to proper blonde
