= Allen Denton =

American journalist

- Born: Indianapolis, IN
- Occupations: Broadcast journalist (1983–present), Radio DJ (1970–1983)
- Title: News anchor/reporter

Allen Denton is an American television journalist. He was a news anchor for the San Diego independent station KUSI-TV and has been a co-anchor at KNTV in San Jose.

== Career ==
Denton started his career as a Radio DJ after high school. He spent the next 11 years in this profession and as a newscaster. From 1981 to 2019, he was a television journalist on various channels, such as the Gray Television stations WBKO-TV, WAVE-TV and WTVK-TV (now WVLT-TV), and the Nexstar Media Group stations WTVW and WSPA-TV, as well as the NBC stations WCNC-TV and KNTV. He also worked for the independent station KUSI-TV

He is known for his stories in KUSI's ‘San Diego People’, where he presented the America's Cup time trials, California's recall of Governor Gray Davis, the inauguration of Governor Arnold Schwarzenegger, Texas Governor Rick Perry's presidential bid, and the resignation of San Diego Mayor Bob Filner. He got nominated for his story "One Day on the U-S-S Albuquerque", for a regional emmy in 2016. He retired from KUSI-TV in February 2019.

== Awards ==
Denton has won three Emmy awards, the first for co-anchoring a live broadcast of the Breeder's Cup race from Churchill Downs. The second was for his coverage of the 2002 Winter Olympics in Salt Lake City, and the third was for a documentary about the year that followed 9/11.

Denton has also been awarded two Associated Press awards, one for Best News Anchor in the San Francisco Bay Area market and the other for Best Live Coverage of a News Event.
