= Ted Leitner =

American sportscaster (born 1947)

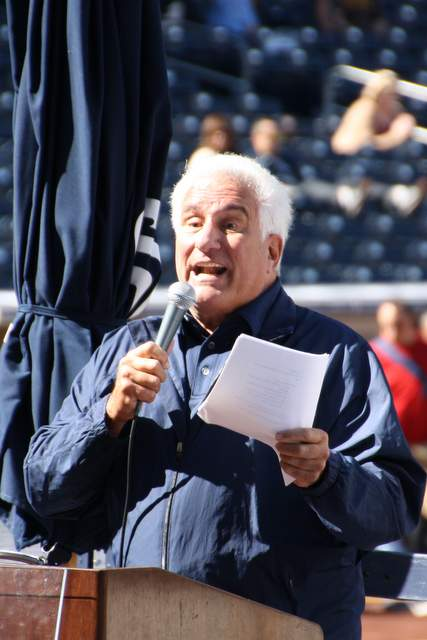
- Leitner at 2014 San Diego Padres Fan Fest
- Born: Theodore Leitner; July 9, 1947 (age 78); Bronx, New York, U.S.
- Occupation: Sports announcer

Theodore Leitner (born July 9, 1947) is an American former sportscaster.

Best known for his role as a play-by-play announcer for San Diego Padres baseball from 1980 to 2020, Leitner has also called San Diego State Aztecs men's basketball and football since 1979. He is a well known figure around the city of San Diego. He is also a former sportscaster for KFMB-TV and host on KFMB radio in San Diego. Due to a hectic schedule, he left KFMB just three days shy of his 25th anniversary at that station. He kept his play-by-play job with the San Diego Padres (who left that station around the same time for cross-town rival KOGO radio) and later XX Sports Radio (he also for a short time tried an afternoon show on XX Sports Radio as well). His association with the Padres dates back to 1980.

== Background ==
Leitner was born in the New York City borough of the Bronx, and at age 8 moved with his family to the adjacent city of Yonkers, New York, in Westchester County. He played football for Roosevelt High School in Yonkers. After high school he attended and graduated from Oklahoma State University in Stillwater, Oklahoma, and then completed a master's degree at the University of Oklahoma in Norman, Oklahoma.

Before starting his long tenure in San Diego in 1980, Leitner worked as a television sportscaster at WFSB in Hartford, Connecticut, and at WCAU-TV in Philadelphia. He also was a broadcaster for the Philadelphia Eagles, the San Diego Clippers and the San Diego Chargers, and with university sports in Oklahoma, Hartford, and San Diego. He has six sons and one daughter. He has been divorced four times.

== Sports commentary ==
When calling San Diego Padres games, Leitner was known for his outspoken style, and for referring to the team as "My Padres" when they were winning and/or playing well and as "Your Padres" when they were losing or in a bad stretch. For years, Leitner did television on the Padres' cable TV network, as well as doing the 5 and 11 pm sportscasts for KFMB-TV. His home run call was "ball going, ball gone!"

Leitner has a history of mocking those who like NHL hockey, and those who complain to the station that he does not show highlights. To "appease" hockey fans, Ted would occasionally show a highlight clip of an NHL game, typically two enforcers squared off in a fight. If only one NHL game was being played on a given night, Leitner would claim that he was about to show every goal scored. The 3 or 4 goals would then be shown in rapidly edited fashion.

In 2015 he was inducted into the Southern California Jewish Sports Hall of Fame.

On May 29, 2018, he announced via Twitter that he had been diagnosed with cancer and would be leaving the Padres broadcasts indefinitely. On June 15 he announced via Twitter that his cancer scare was a benign tumor, and on June 29 he announced that he would return to Padres broadcasting.

On January 15, 2021, Leitner announced that he was leaving the Padres' radio booth to transition to a role as a community-relations ambassador for the team. In 2022, he was named to the Padres Hall of Fame.
