= Channel 69 virtual TV stations in the United States =

The following television stations operate on virtual channel 69 in the United States:

- KSOY-LD in McAllen, Texas
- KSWB-TV in San Diego, California
- W24CS-D in Reading, Pennsylvania
- WAMI-DT in Hollywood, Florida
- WDTI in Indianapolis, Indiana
- WFMZ-TV in Allentown, Pennsylvania
- WMYS-LD in South Bend, Indiana
- WPTG-CD in Pittsburgh, Pennsylvania
- WPXQ-TV in Newport, Rhode Island
- WQAW-LD in Lake Shore, Maryland
- WUPA in Atlanta, Georgia
