= Jack O. Gross =

American broadcaster (1905–1985)

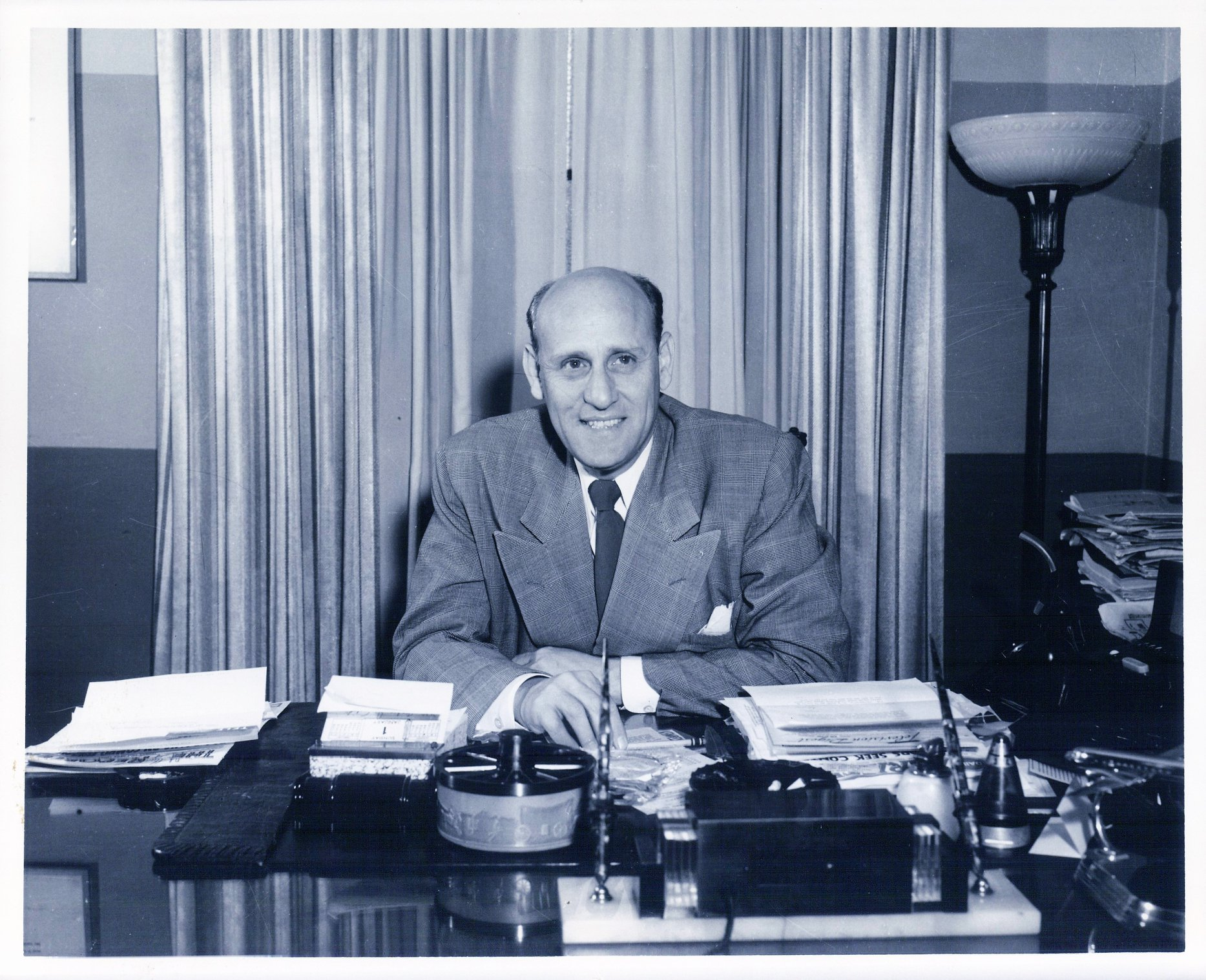
Jack O. Gross

Jack O. Gross (b. August 22, 1905 in St Louis, MO – d. May 1, 1985 in San Diego, CA) was an American broadcaster who founded KFMB-TV, the first television station in San Diego.

== Career ==
KFMB-TV first signed on the air on May 16, 1949; it was the first television station in the San Diego market. The station was founded by Jack O. Gross, who also owned local radio station KFMB (760 AM). San Diego Mayor Harley E. Knox was present at the station's first broadcast. The station cost Gross $300,000 to build. KFMB-TV has been a primary CBS affiliate since its sign-on (and is the only television station in the market that has never changed its network affiliation), however in its early years, channel 8 also maintained secondary affiliations with ABC, NBC and the DuMont Television Network.

In October 1949, KFMB-TV signed an affiliation agreement with the short-lived Paramount Television Network; upon affiliating with Paramount, channel 8 quickly became that network's strongest affiliate. The station received a network feed of Paramount programs that included among others, Hollywood Opportunity, Meet Me in Hollywood, Magazine of the Week, Time For Beany and Your Old Buddy; the station aired six hours of Paramount programs each week. Since there was no technical transmission network to distribute Paramount programs to its affiliates, KFMB instead carried the network's programming via a transmitter link from the broadcast tower of Paramount's Los Angeles affiliate KTLA atop Mount Wilson, 90 miles (140 km) from the KFMB-TV transmitter site on Mount Soledad.

In the early years, from 1949 to 1953, KFMB operated in the basement of the San Diego Hotel at 5th and Ash streets. The building has since been demolished and is now a parking lot.

In November 1950, Gross sold the KFMB stations to John A. Kennedy, a former publisher of the San Diego Daily Journal newspaper, who in turn sold the station again in 1952.

In 1952, Gross became one of the first owners of the San Diego Padres.

Gross continued to buy and sell interests in radio and television stations throughout the 1950s, 1960s and 1970s, including KSON, KALB-TV, KSDO and KBUK, which he owned at the time of his death. He was a founder of the City Bank of San Diego and active in fundraising for various Jewish causes.

== Personal life ==
Gross was born in St Louis, Missouri. He was married to Loretta Glazer Gross (1906-1999), who was an heir to the Fort Worth-based Uncle Jo Bottling Company. Gross died May 1, 1985.

His sons were television writer Jack Gross Jr. and KNSD entertainment critic Laurence Gross.

He had five grandchildren. His grandson is Beverly Hills Weekly publisher Josh E. Gross.
