= KFMB-TV =

Television station in San Diego

- San Diego, California; United States
- Channels: Digital: 8 (VHF); Virtual: 8
- Branding: CBS 8; News 8 San Diego (8.2); News 8 (newscasts)

Programming
- Affiliations: 8.1: CBS; 8.2: Independent with MyNetworkTV; for others, see § Subchannels

Ownership
- Owner: Tegna Inc., a subsidiary of Nexstar Media Group; (KFMB-TV, LLC)
- Sister stations: Nexstar: KUSI-TV, KSWB-TV

History
- First air date: May 16, 1949
- Former channel numbers: Analog: 8 (VHF, 1949–2009); Digital: 55 (UHF, 2000–2009)
- Former affiliations: NBC (secondary, 1949–1953); DuMont (secondary, 1949–1956); ABC (secondary, 1949–1956); The CW (8.2, 2017–2026)
- Call sign meaning: For Mary and Burnham (daughter and son of Warren B. Worcester, founder of former sister station KFMB (AM))

Technical information
- Licensing authority: FCC
- Facility ID: 42122
- ERP: 19.8 kW
- HAAT: 227 m (745 ft)
- Transmitter coordinates: 32°50′17″N 117°15′0″W

Links
- Public license information: Public file; LMS
- Website: www.cbs8.com

KFMB-TV (channel 8) is a television station in San Diego, California, United States, affiliated with CBS. It is owned by the Tegna subsidiary of Nexstar Media Group; Nexstar also owns CW station KUSI-TV (channel 51) and Fox affiliate KSWB-TV (channel 69). KFMB-TV's studios are located on Engineer Road in the Kearny Mesa section of San Diego, and its transmitter is atop Mount Soledad in La Jolla.

== History ==
The station first signed on the air on May 16, 1949. It was the first television station in San Diego. The station was founded by Jack O. Gross, who also owned local radio station KFMB (760 AM). San Diego mayor Harley E. Knox was present at the station's first broadcast. The station cost Gross $300,000 to build. KFMB-TV has been a primary CBS affiliate since its sign-on and is the only television station in the market that has never changed its network affiliation. In its early years, channel 8 also maintained secondary affiliations with ABC, NBC and the DuMont Television Network.

In October 1949, KFMB-TV signed an affiliation agreement with the short-lived Paramount Television Network. Channel 8 quickly became its strongest affiliate. The station received a network feed of Paramount programs that included among others, Hollywood Opportunity, Meet Me in Hollywood, Magazine of the Week, Time for Beany and Your Old Buddy. KFMB-TV aired six hours of Paramount programs each week. Since there was no technical transmission network to distribute Paramount programs to its affiliates, KFMB-TV instead carried the network's programming via a transmitter link from the broadcast tower of Paramount's Los Angeles affiliate KTLA atop Mount Wilson, 90 miles (140 km) from the KFMB-TV transmitter site on Mount Soledad.

=== Changes in ownership ===
In November 1950, Gross sold KFMB-AM-TV to John A. Kennedy, a former publisher of the San Diego Daily Journal newspaper. Three years later, Kennedy divested KFMB to a partnership of television producer Jack Wrather and industry executive Helen Alvarez. That same year, channel 8 lost its television monopoly in San Diego when two new stations went on the air—Tijuana-based XETV (channel 6) and San Diego–licensed KFSD-TV (channel 10, now KGTV), the latter of which assumed the NBC affiliation from channel 8. KFMB-TV continued to air ABC programs until 1956, when XETV was granted permission to take the ABC affiliation under a special agreement between the FCC and Mexican authorities, most notably the Secretariat of Communications and Public Works.

After the Wrather-Alvarez partnership broke up in 1957, Wrather kept the San Diego outlets and KERO-TV in upstate Bakersfield for his renamed broadcasting company, Marietta Broadcasting. In 1959, Wrather merged Marietta Broadcasting with Buffalo, New York–based Transcontinent Television Corporation. In 1964, as part of Transcontinent's exit from broadcasting, the KFMB stations were sold to Midwest Television, controlled by the family of Champaign, Illinois, banker August Meyer. In 1999, Midwest Television divested its other outlets, WCIA/WCFN in Champaign–Springfield and WMBD-AM-TV and WPBG in Peoria, Illinois, leaving the KFMB stations as the company's only remaining properties.

In 2005, Midwest Television signed a ten-year affiliation contract extension for KFMB-TV to remain a CBS affiliate through 2015. The station restored its on-air branding to News 8 on September 19, 2005, after four years of using the "Local 8" brand. In early 2007, the station began to phase in a new branding as "CBS 8", although newscasts maintained the News 8 title until 2013, when the station introduced a new logo similar to Miami's CBS O&O WFOR-TV and renamed its newscasts CBS News 8.

=== Switch to digital broadcasting ===
KFMB-TV shut down its analog signal, over VHF channel 8, on February 17, 2009, the original target date on which full-power television stations in the United States were to transition from analog to digital broadcasts under federal mandate (which was later pushed back to June 12, 2009).

The station's digital signal relocated from its pre-transition UHF channel 55, which was among the high band UHF channels (52–69) that were removed from broadcasting use as a result of the transition, to its analog-era VHF channel 8.

=== Tegna ownership ===
On December 18, 2017, Tegna Inc. announced that it would acquire the KFMB stations for $325 million. The sale was completed on February 15, 2018, ending the Meyer family's stewardship of the stations after 53 years. On March 12, 2019, former KFMB owner Elisabeth Kimmel, the granddaughter of Midwest Television founder August Meyer, was arrested for her role in the 2019 college admissions scandal, which involved conspiracy to commit mail fraud and honest services mail fraud to boost her son's college admission credentials for pole vaulting.

KFMB-TV was separated from its radio sisters on March 17, 2020, when Tegna sold KFMB (760 AM) and KFMB-FM 100.7 to Local Media San Diego, which in turn spun KFMB (AM) to iHeartMedia. Under the terms of the deal, Tegna retained exclusive control of the KFMB call sign for KFMB-TV, with the radio stations required to change their call letters within 30 days of the sale; LMSD changed KFMB-FM to KFBG that April. Meanwhile, iHeartMedia changed KFMB (AM) to KGB on July 4.

=== Nexstar ownership and common operation with KUSI and KSWB-TV ===
Nexstar Media Group, owner of KUSI-TV and KSWB-TV in San Diego, acquired Tegna in a deal announced in August 2025 and completed on March 19, 2026. The deal included approval for Nexstar to own three TV station licenses in markets including San Diego.

== KFMB-DT2 ==
Logo for DT2 subchannel

KFMB-DT2, branded News 8 San Diego, is the second digital subchannel of KFMB-TV, operating as an independent station that carries the MyNetworkTV programming service. It broadcasts in 720p high definition on channel 8.2.

=== History ===
On November 1, 2011, KFMB launched KFMB-DT2, an affiliate of MeTV, by way of an agreement between the network's owner, Weigel Broadcasting, and Midwest Television that was announced two months earlier on September 6.

On January 18, 2017, Midwest Television and network co-parent CBS Corporation announced that KFMB would become the San Diego affiliate of The CW, which would be carried on one of the station's digital subchannels; the station would replace Tijuana-licensed XETV-TDT (channel 6), which had been affiliated with the network since 2008. The move stemmed from a failure between CBS and XETV owner Grupo Televisa, during negotiations to renew an affiliation contract set to expire that September, to reach an agreement to keep the affiliation with XETV. KFMB-TV digital subchannel 8.2 was originally scheduled to take over the CW affiliation on September 1, 2017. However, these plans changed on January 26, 2017, when Televisa announced that it would drop all English-language programming (including its CW affiliation) from XETV on May 31, at the completion of a phased wind-down of the station's San Diego operations (this process began on March 31, with the closure of channel 6's news department); KFMB consequently moved up the date of the switch to May 31, to align with XETV's planned conversion into a repeater of one of Televisa's Spanish-language networks.

In preparation, Midwest sold the local rights to the MeTV affiliation to the E. W. Scripps Company, owner of ABC affiliate KGTV; MeTV moved from KFMB-DT2 to the second digital subchannel of KGTV–which was also simulcast on KZSD-LP (channel 41, now a KGTV translator on channel 20), which lost its Azteca affiliation to a subchannel of MyNetworkTV affiliate XHDTV-TDT (channel 49), in preparation for the network's July 1 move to XHAS-TDT (channel 33), which also lost its Telemundo affiliation to a subchannel of NBC-owned KNSD–on May 1 (to accommodate MeTV, KGTV relocated Laff onto the re-numbered 10.3 from digital channel 10.2, which, in the interim, was converted into a news channel that aired simulcasts and rebroadcasts of KGTV's local news programming). That same day, KFMB-DT2 began to air a pre-launch loop for the new affiliation with the network on its former MeTV space along with a message card of the MeTV affiliation moving to KGTV 10.2. The signal resolution for KFMB-DT2 was subsequently converted to 720p high definition on May 21.

KFMB-DT2 added programming from The CW on May 31, 2017 (XETV transferred its existing affiliation with co-owned Canal 5 from its decommissioned 6.2 subchannel to its main feed upon losing the CW affiliation). The subchannel–which was rebranded as "The CW San Diego"–concurrently adopted a general entertainment schedule featuring a mix of syndicated shows not carried by other San Diego stations, repeat airings of certain programs seen on KFMB's main channel, and many first-run and off-network syndicated programs (including talk shows and sitcoms) that previously aired on XETV prior to the switch to fill timeslots not occupied by CW network programs. It also launched a two-hour extension of KFMB's weekday morning newscast, along with separate, weeknight-only 7 p.m. and 10 p.m. newscasts produced for KFMB-DT2 (the newscasts shown on the subchannel are branded as News 8 on The CW San Diego, omitting all references to the CBS name included in KFMB's main news titling). The subchannel also took over XETV's slot on channel 6 on Cox, Spectrum and U-verse (those providers as well as DirecTV—which opted to carry KFMB-DT2 on channel 9, transmitting temporarily in standard definition only in the days immediately following the switch—and Dish Network dropped XETV from their lineups upon its switch to Canal 5, with the station's availability on the U.S. side of the market becoming limited to its existing over-the-air signal coverage).

KFMB became the third television station in San Diego to affiliate with The CW: the network was originally affiliated with KSWB-TV (channel 69) beginning at The CW's launch on September 18, 2006, before moving to XETV on August 1, 2008, after Tribune Broadcasting agreed to switch KSWB to Fox, reportedly due to that network's concerns about having its programming airing on a Mexican-licensed station, even though XETV had operated as an English-language station since its 1953 sign-on. The switch resulted in KFMB-DT2 becoming the largest CW station by market size that is carried over a digital subchannel, and San Diego becoming the largest market with a subchannel-only CW affiliate (overtaking WKRC-DT2 in Cincinnati) as well as the largest overall in which any of the six major networks maintains a subchannel-only affiliation. In 2021 it was overtaken by WZTV-DT2 in Nashville.

In September 2018, after XHDTV-TDT dropped MyNetworkTV to join Milenio Television, KFMB-DT2 added the programming service as a secondary affiliation. MyNetworkTV programming is carried as part of the subchannel's late-night schedule, an increasingly common fate for the service. In 2026, after Nexstar acquired Tegna, The CW moved to KUSI-TV.

== Programming ==
For years, KFMB-TV has chosen to air The Bold and the Beautiful outside of the network's recommended 12:30 p.m. timeslot in the Pacific Time Zone. This stemmed from when the station had an hour-long noon newscast, as the station aired the program at 9:30 a.m. (the midday newscast has since moved to 11 a.m.). The Bold and the Beautiful had aired at 11:30 a.m. from 2009 to 2013, when it moved to 12:30 p.m. as the lead-in to The Young and the Restless (which itself normally airs at 11 a.m. in the Pacific Time Zone). It also airs CBS Saturday Morning two hours earlier than most CBS stations (aligning it with the program's recommended timeslot in the Eastern Time Zone).

=== Sports programming ===
KFMB-TV has served three stints as the broadcast television partner of San Diego Padres baseball, with the first running from 1980 through 1983, the second covering the 1995 and 1996 campaigns, and a third stint beginning in the 2025 season (in addition to CBS' national coverage of MLB games from 1990 to 1993). Channel 8 is the latest San Diego over-the-air station to regularly televise Padres games locally; with the exception of games carried by Fox, the team was cable-exclusive from 1997 through 2024.

In 1998, KFMB-TV was awarded the local broadcast rights to San Diego Chargers preseason game telecasts; that same year, CBS acquired the rights to the American Football Conference (the NFL conference of which the Chargers are a member), making channel 8 the station of record for the team, succeeding KNSD in that capacity (the station had previously aired Chargers home interconference games from 1970 to 1993). This would remain so until 2017, when the team returned to Los Angeles after 55 years, thus ending channel 8's status as the team's unofficial home station (despite the move, the station still airs a majority of their games as San Diego is still a secondary market for the team and therefore road games are contractually required to be aired in the market). Channel 8 also simulcast the Chargers' appearances on NFL Network's Thursday Night Football and ESPN's Monday Night Football, as per NFL rules which require games aired on cable networks to be simulcast on a local broadcast station in the team's home market.

KFMB-TV also airs select San Diego State Aztecs men's basketball games as part of College Basketball on CBS; this included the team's appearance in the 2023 NCAA Division I men's basketball championship game.

=== News operation ===
As of January 2024, KFMB presently broadcasts 39 hours of locally produced newscasts each week (with seven hours each weekday and two hours each on Saturdays and Sundays), and also produces an additional 23 hours a week of local newscasts for KFMB-DT2 (with four hours each weekday, 1 1/2 hours on Saturdays and a half hour on Sundays). KFMB runs an hour-long local newscast at 6 p.m. on weekdays. Unlike most CBS affiliates in the Pacific Time Zone, KFMB runs a half-hour local newscast at 6:30 p.m. on weekends. KFMB operates the only news helicopter in the San Diego market; its "Chopper 8" helicopter provides aerial video to most of the market's news-producing television stations through Local News Service agreements.

Some famous KFMB alumni include former weather anchor Raquel Tejada (who eventually became a successful actress as Raquel Welch), talk show host Regis Philbin, television host Sarah Purcell, CNN and former CBS anchor Paula Zahn, original Access Hollywood host Larry Mendte, and eventual NBC correspondents Don Teague (later at KRIV in Houston) and Dawn Fratangelo. KFMB has led in newscast viewership in the San Diego market for most of its history, dating back to the 1950s when Ray Wilson was the popular anchor of the city's first half-hour newscast. When Wilson stepped down in 1973, KFMB slipped to a distant second behind KGTV, rebounding only in the late 1970s and early 1980s when former KGTV producer Jim Holtzman was hired by the station as its news director. Holtzman formed a popular and acclaimed news team consisting of anchors Michael Tuck and Allison Ross, weather anchor Clark Anthony, and sports anchor Ted Leitner. By the end of 1979, KFMB had risen back to the #1 position, remaining there until 1984 when Tuck suddenly moved to KGTV and helped that station overtake KFMB for the remainder of the decade.

Holtzman tried in vain to compete by experimenting with a different format for the 11 p.m. newscast called This Day which emphasized a softer, humanized format and attempted to find a common thread within the newscast. There was no regular anchor; instead Hal Clement, Loren Nancarrow (now deceased), Dawn Fratangelo (now with NBC) and Susan Lichtman (now known as Susan Taylor and with KNSD) formed an ensemble of anchor/reporters who alternated between anchoring, filing detailed reports and giving live interviews. Computer graphics were used heavily, and Dave Grusin's "Night Lines" served as the newscast's theme music.

Although it was innovative for its time, This Day proved to be a dismal failure as viewers responded negatively to the awkward format; within nine months, KFMB reverted to a more traditional late evening newscast. However, the news ratings for KFMB went into a deep decline for more than a decade as popular mainstays like Marty Levin and Allison Ross (both of whom reappeared in the market on KNSD) either left voluntarily or were fired and were replaced by younger staffers like Stan Miller and Susan Roesgen.

Eventually by the 1990s, Hal Clement would assume early evening anchor duties alongside Susan Peters and later, Denise Yamada to mixed results as the station continued to battle KGTV and KNSD, primarily in the 11 p.m. timeslot where the CBS lead-in at the time was particularly weaker. By the early 2000s, Michael Tuck's brief return following Clement's departure for KGTV and CBS's resurgence at the start of the decade helped bring KFMB back to first place in the early evenings. By October 2020, KFMB, which had become the most watched television station in San Diego (based on Nielsen ratings share data) from sign-on to sign-off, finished in first place in the noon, and afternoon and evening news timeslots (at 4 p.m., 5 p.m., 6 p.m. and at 11 p.m. weekdays).

During coverage of the California wildfires of October 2007, reporter Larry Himmel took viewers on a walkthrough of his own home, which had been destroyed in the fires. Audio of the station's news programming was also simulcast on KFMB (AM) and KFMB-FM for an extended period of time. On January 28, 2007, KFMB became the first television station in the San Diego market to begin broadcasting its local newscasts in high definition; with the upgrade, the station unveiled a new set for its newscasts.

==== Notable former on-air staff ====
- Jerry G. Bishop – co-host of Sun Up San Diego (1978–1990)
- Marc Brown (1987–1989)
- Rebecca Gomez – morning/noon anchor and reporter (?–1996 and 2001–2002)
- Jim Laslavic – sports anchor (1983–1989)
- Ted Leitner – sports anchor (1978–2003)
- Sandra Maas – anchor/medical reporter (1990–2001)
- Larry Mendte – weather anchor (1988–1991)
- Susan Peters – anchor (1991–1995)
- Sarah Purcell – talk show host (1970s)
- Susan Roesgen – anchor (1989–1991)
- Danuta Rylko – co-host of Sun Up San Diego (1976–1983)
- Michael Tuck – anchor (1978–1984 and 1999–2004)
- Raquel Welch – weather (early 1960s)
- Paula Zahn – (1979–1981)

== Subchannels ==
The station's signal is multiplexed:

Subchannels of KFMB-TV
Subchannel	Res.	Short name	Programming
8.1	1080i	KFMB-HD	CBS
8.2	720p	MyTV	Independent with MyNetworkTV
8.3	480i	QUEST	Quest
8.4	480i	Crime	True Crime Network
8.5	480i	COURT	Court TV
8.6	480i	NEST	The Nest

== See also ==
- KGB (AM)
- KFBG (FM)
