= Clinton D. McKinnon =

American journalist

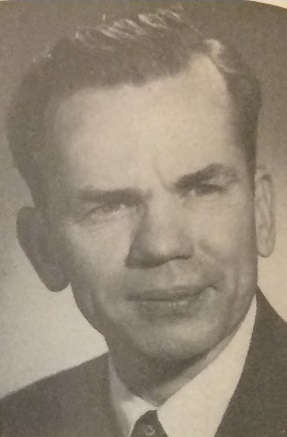

Member of the U.S. House of Representatives from California's 23rd district
- In office January 3, 1949 – January 3, 1953
- Preceded by: Charles K. Fletcher
- Succeeded by: Clyde Doyle

Personal details
- Born: Clinton Dotson McKinnon; February 5, 1906 Dallas, Texas
- Died: December 29, 2001 (aged 95) La Jolla, California
- Party: Democratic
- Education: University of Redlands (B.A. 1930)
- Occupation: Journalist; newspaper editor; publisher; bank president

Clinton Dotson McKinnon (February 5, 1906 – December 29, 2001) was an American Democratic politician and journalist from San Diego, California. He served two terms in the United States House of Representatives from 1949 to 1953.

== Biography ==
McKinnon was born in 1906 in Dallas, Texas, to Dr. John and Tennie McKinnon; his mother was a nurse. He was their only child; his father died when he was 12.

=== Education ===
He graduated from Palo Alto High School in Palo Alto, California. McKinnon attended Stanford University in 1924, attended the University of Geneva in 1930, and received a BA from University of Redlands in 1930.

=== Early career ===
McKinnon was a journalist and owned newspapers in Texas and California. In 1942, Time described McKinnon as "a jockey-sized little fireball with unruly black hair and bounding energy" who started several local throwaway newspapers in Los Angeles's San Fernando Valley that specialized in neighborhood or industry-focused human interest stories, selling ads to local merchants.

=== San Diego Daily Journal ===
In 1943, McKinnon sold his three LA area papers and bought the three-times-a-week San Diego Progress-Journal. In January 1944, he announced it would be converted to a daily format, making it the only daily newspaper to be established during World War II, the San Diego Daily Journal. The Franklin Roosevelt administration allocated newsprint, then under rationing, to the Daily Journal, allowing it to compete with the Republican San Diego Tribune.

Ahead of his run for Congress, McKinnon sold the paper to journalist John A. Kennedy in 1947; Kennedy sold it to the Union-Tribune Publishing Company in 1950.

Journal alumni include Tribune editor and columnist Neil Morgan and Congressman Lionel Van Deerlin. Van Deerlin recalled:

"He was one of the guys-very different from your standard publisher. At the company picnics, he would be pitching softballs. He would come through the newsroom and he would know the names of your kids and which ones had been sick."

=== Congress ===
McKinnon was first elected to the House of Representatives in 1948, defeating Republican incumbent Charles K. Fletcher, founder of Home Federal Savings and Loan. During the campaign, McKinnon hogged the stage for 15 minutes, keeping President Truman from speaking to the crowd waiting for him. Later in Washington, McKinnon apologized to Truman, and Truman glared back at McKinnon, then said: "Well, you got elected, didn't you? That's the only thing that matters."

McKinnon served until 1953. In Congress, he fought for water projects for San Diego. Gordon Luce, then the California Republican Party Chairman, said that he was a bright and hard-working leader that even political opponents respected. In 1952, instead of running for reelection, he ran for the Democratic nomination for Senator against better-known Republican Senator Bill Knowland. Candidates could then run in multiple party primaries in California, and Knowland won both the Republican and Democratic primaries. Since the Congressional districts were redrawn in 1952, McKinnon was the last Representative to serve all of San Diego County.

=== Later career ===
McKinnon was a delegate to the 1952 and 1956 Democratic National Conventions.

McKinnon preferred to be known as a journalist rather than a politician. In December 1952, as he prepared to leave office, he bought the Los Angeles Daily News, which he sold two years later.

His other ventures included the La Jolla Light, Coronado Journal, and radio station KSDJ (now KCBQ).

=== Death ===
McKinnon died on December 29, 2001, in La Jolla, California.

=== Family ===
McKinnon and his wife Lucille had two sons, Clinton Daniel (Dan) and Michael Dean (Mike), and a daughter Connie.

Mike, who died in 2012, was the majority stockholder in McKinnon Broadcasting, owner of San Diego Home/Garden Lifestyles magazine, and a Texas state legislator from 1972 to 1976. Dan, the former owner of KSON radio, was a minority stockholder in McKinnon Broadcasting, ran for US Congress as a Republican in 1980, and was national campaign chairman for the Duncan Hunter for President campaign in 2008.

== Electoral history ==
1948 election
Party	Candidate	Votes	%
Democratic	Clinton D. McKinnon	112,534	55.8%
Republican	Charles K. Fletcher (Incumbent)	87,138	43.2%
Progressive	Harry C. Steinmetz	2,017	1.0%
Total votes		201,689	100.0%
Turnout			
Democratic gain from Republican			

1950 election
Party	Candidate	Votes	%
Democratic	Clinton D. McKinnon (Incumbent)	94,137	51%
Republican	Leslie E. Gehres	90,398	49%
Total votes		184,535	100.0%
Turnout			
Democratic hold			

U.S. House of Representatives
Preceded by Charles K. Fletcher	Member of the U.S. House of Representatives from California's 23rd congressional district 1949–1953	Succeeded by Clyde Doyle
