= Bartell Group =

Radio broadcasting company

The Bartell Group, later known as Bartell Broadcasters, Bartell Family Radio, Macfadden-Bartell, and the Bartell Media Corporation, was a family-owned company that owned a number of radio stations in the United States during the 1940s through the 1960s.

Family members involved in the radio operations included five siblings, Gerald "Jerry" Bartell, Melvin Bartell, Lee Bartell, David Bartell, Rosa Bartell Evans, and one sibling-in-law, Ralph Evans. Several of them got their start in while attending the University of Wisconsin and participating in the operations of university-owned station WHA. They entered the radio business with Milwaukee station WEXT in 1947, on the belief that between them they had expertise in law, engineering, music, writing, and acting, all of which would prove useful in the field. Some of the more well-known stations the Bartell Group owned include WOKY in Milwaukee, Wisconsin, KCBQ in San Diego, California, KRUX 1360 in Phoenix, Arizona, and Spanish-language WADO in New York City. The family also owned a few television stations, including WMTV-TV in Madison, Wisconsin and Telecuraçao and Telearuba in the Caribbean. The family members left the radio business in 1968, but the Bartell Media Corporation name carried on into much of the 1970s.

The Bartell Group was an important broadcasting entity during the post-World War II era and helped pioneer the Top 40 radio format. Three of the Bartell family members have been inducted into the Wisconsin Broadcasters Hall of Fame.

== Family origins ==
The Bartell siblings were the children of Russian Jews Benjamin and Lena Beznor. The father immigrated to the United States in 1911, with the mother following in 1913, as part of the wave of Central and Eastern European Jews who came to America. (Other accounts place the parents coming in 1913 or later.)

Three of the children were born in Belopolye in Russia: Belle (1906–2005), David B.(1908–2006), and Lee K. (1910–1991), while three of the children were born once the family was in the United States: Gerald A. "Jerry" (1914–1990) in Chicago, Illinois, and Melvin (1916–2006) and Elizabeth Robbin "Rosa" (1918–2009) in Milwaukee, Wisconsin. Belle was the only one of the siblings that did not become involved in the family radio business.

The family name of Beznor gradually evolved to Bartell, with it being done first by those siblings who were public performers. So while the first public mentions of Gerald in 1937 have him using Bartell, as late as 1949 and then 1953, David and Lee were still using Beznor in their public business work, until they switched too for consistency.

== An interest in radio ==
The family's interest in radio began with Gerald Bartell's time at the University of Wisconsin during the 1930s, when he was on the student staff of university-owned station WHA. As one university history states, Gerald was "a talented student with natural ability for acting and producing." After graduating in 1937 with a B.A. in economics, he remained a staff member there as he entered graduate school, gaining a master's degree in 1939. During his time in school he also sometimes worked in Chicago as an actor in network radio soap operas. He also barked like a canine in a commercial for Red Heart dog food. Gerald subsequently became part of the faculty at the University of Wisconsin, being named an assistant professor of radio education in the Department of Speech in 1940. While on the faculty he took advantage of a Rockefeller Foundation fellowship and worked at NBC in New York in sales, merchandising, and production tasks.

Melvin also was on the student staff at WHA and was a popular figure on the air through his graduation in 1938. An aspiring opera singer, he then went to the University of Rochester to attend its Eastman School of Music, from where he gained a degree in 1941. While in Rochester he worked at radio station WHAM.

Rosa too was a student at the University of Wisconsin and on the staff at WHA, where she was a singer, songwriter, program producer, and music librarian. There she met Ralph Evans, an electrical engineering student who worked at the station as a broadcast engineer, and they subsequently married a couple of years later.

== Family in World War II ==
Captain Melvin Bartell served in the United States Army in the Pacific Ocean theater of World War II as part of the Armed Forces Radio Service (AFRS). This operation was running the Far East Network through the Pacific, which provided important morale support to the armed forces engaged in the U.S. island-hopping campaign. Bartell was attached to the headquarters command of General Douglas MacArthur.

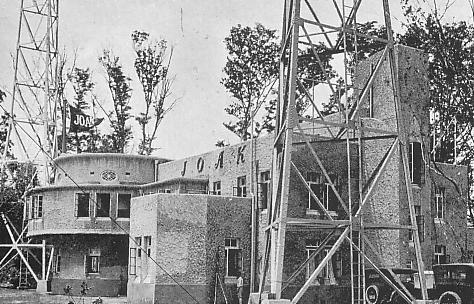
JOAK radio in Tokyo, here seen in the 1930s

Following the formal Japanese surrender that concluded the war, Bartell was part of the occupation of Japan. Bartell was put in charge of the takeover of JOAK, Tokyo's 50,000-watt radio station that had featured the broadcasts of Tokyo Rose. The station, which renamed itself as WVTR, was the first Armed Forces Radio station on air in Japan, signing-on with the phrase, "This is Armed Forces Radio Service, Station WVTR in Tokyo" on September 12, 1945.

On the station Bartell devoted the programming to original shows about the occupation, overseas Army shows such as Command Performance, as well as rebroadcasts of popular American shows. In addition to directing the programming, Melvin also appeared on-air.

Meanwhile, Rosa and Ralph Evans moved to Washington, D.C., where he worked as a civilian for the United States Navy in classified research into radar. She worked in personnel for the United States Naval Research Laboratory. She also worked at radio station WTOP in Washington for Arthur Godfrey, selecting records for him, in the period before he became nationally known.

Gerald Bartell enlisted into the United States Navy and at first was assigned to teach courses at a naval training school for radio operators that had been established on the university campus. Following that he became a naval aviation ensign and served for three years with the VPB-92 patrol bombing squadron including off the coast of Morocco during the North African Campaign.

== Entering the radio business in Milwaukee ==
By January 1946, Melvin Bartell had returned to the United States. Following his discharge, he pursued a career as a singer. Rosa and Ralph Evans returned to Wisconsin, where he finished his engineering degree. David and Lee had become a lawyers, and Gerald was again on the faculty at University of Wisconsin, where he was assistant professor of radio education.

Lee Bartell heard that broadcasting would probably be a good business to be in the post-war environment and, as Rosa later said, he "had this idea for us to go into the broadcasting business, because our respective professions included law, engineering, music, writing and acting. He felt that among the six of us, we had all the talent and expertise needed for a successful venture." The family raised $50,000 towards this new endeavor.

The Bartells had their origin in radio in the Milwaukee area, in the form of WEXT, a 1,000-watt daytimer radio station at 1430 kilocycles in Milwaukee. It was founded by Lee, David, Gerald, and Rosa Bartell Evans and began operations on August 31, 1947. Its studio was located on Milwaukee's South Side.

The Milwaukee market's fifth radio station, WEXT did fairly well with a broadcast schedule that included popular music and ethnic programming, including a polka music show hosted by local radio legend John Reddy. Officially, Gerald was listed as station president, Rosa as program director, and Ralph was chief engineer.

The programming also included "Playtime for Children", a program narrated and sung by Gerald Bartell. These were recorded on tape and sent to a variety of radio stations around the state, including even other stations in Milwaukee such as WIBA. The program was aimed at pre-school children and those in nursery schools and kindergarten. Rosa appeared on that program as the "Lullaby Lady" and she was also the show's producer, collecting many of the elements that went in it. The program became popular with children, and in 1948 Billboard magazine named it the best children's program in the nation from a radio station in the 250– to 1,000-watt range. The magazine said that "Jerry Bartell, headman of the program, showed a deft touch in his handling of perhaps the most difficult type of children's show, one which all too often is completely ignored by many stations. ... Bartell's warbling ... is swell. It has resonance, and kids can probably ascertain that his heart is in it ... the show is well-produced, well-written, and certainly well-thought out."

With WEXT finding an audience but only barely profitable, the Bartell family applied for full-time broadcast operations, and the result was a move down the dial to AM 920 and a new call sign, WOKY. In doing so they formed a new company named the Bartell Group.

WOKY launched in September 1950. WOKY initially aired a full-service variety format similar to WEXT's, including popular music shows and programs oriented toward housewives and children. This included the continuation of Playtime for Children. Audience figures went up once the station concentrated on a music-and-news format. WOKY is also noteworthy for being the first station in Milwaukee to broadcast traffic reports from a helicopter, courtesy of air personality Art Zander and his feature "The Safer Route". By October 1952, WOKY was the third-most popular radio station in the city.

== Musical activities ==
Melvin did not join in the radio business right away. Still pursuing his singing career, he appeared in the opera Street Scene on Broadway in 1947. The following year, he received honorable mention in American Theater Wing auditions to perform a debut recital. That led to an engagement to sing leading baritone roles with the Covent Garden Opera in London during 1949. He lived in Italy for a while and sang there, then went on to become a regular performer for the Florentine Opera Company in Milwaukee, and by 1958 was president of that organization.

Gerald Bartell, meanwhile, capitalized on his children's program to release a series of children's 78 rpm phonograph records under the name Jerry Bartell. The first of these came out in 1948 and was called Tingo, the Story of a Clown, a 12-minute tale that had been written by his wife Joyce. They featured him playing the characters and singing the songs. Subsequent releases included the song collections Playtime and Jerry Bartell's Playtime Album in 1949, and Pat and the Pixies and The Men Who Come To Our House in 1950, both of which his wife Joyce wrote the stories for. In a review, Billboard said of Pat and the Pixies that it was a "sensitive" and "warm" adaptation of an Irish folk tale, but that Bartell's following from Playtime for Children was not big enough to expect large-scale sales of the record.

In addition Bartell appeared on television in the program Playtime with Jerry, a 15-minute show that was syndicated to stations such as KTVI-TV Channel 2 in St. Louis, which broadcast it on Saturday mornings during 1957–58.

== Expansion ==
The Bartell family expanded to radio stations beyond Milwaukee. The full list of radio stations included:

- WEXT 1430 in Milwaukee, Wisconsin in 1947, shut down 1950
- WTWT 1010 in Stevens Point, Wisconsin in 1948
- WOKW in Sturgeon Bay, Wisconsin in early 1950s (subsequently went dark)
- WOKY 920 in Milwaukee, Wisconsin in 1950
- WAPL 1570 in Appleton, Wisconsin in 1952
- KCHA 1580 in Charles City, Iowa in early 1950s
- WAKE 1340 in Atlanta, Georgia, bought 1955, sold 1962, broadcast from the Georgian Terrace Hotel
- KCBQ 1170 in San Diego, California, bought 1955
- KRUX 1360 in Phoenix, Arizona, bought 1955, sold 1958
- WYDE 850 in Birmingham, Alabama, bought 1957
- WILD 1090 in Boston, Massachusetts, bought 1957, sold 1966
- KYA 1260 in San Francisco, California, bought 1958, sold 1962
- WADO 1280, a Spanish language station in New York City, bought 1959

Some of the smaller stations were sold as the family entered larger markets. By 1960 the family owned six radio stations.

The Bartells also entered into the television market. WMTV-TV Channel 33 began operations in Madison in July 1953 with Gerald Bartell managing it. One of the main programs on it was the culinary show What's Cookin', hosted by pioneering African American chef Carson Gulley and his wife Beatrice. They became among the first black hosts of a television show anywhere in the United States, and despite receiving hate mail on the subject, Bartell did not back down from having them as hosts and the show ran for the next nine years.

This was followed by WOKY-TV Channel 19 in Milwaukee in October 1953. It was bought by CBS the following year.

The Bartell Group also became involved in the creation of Telecuraçao and Telearuba, television stations in the Caribbean islands of Curaçao and Aruba, with the former starting in 1960 and the latter in 1963. The government of the Netherlands Antilles joined with the Bartell Group to form the Netherlands Antilles Television & Electronic Company. Each station was on the air for about eight hours per day. The contract the two stations in the Netherlands Antilles had was expired on December 12, 1967, putting the stations under government control on September 12, 1968.

The full list of family television stations thus included:

- WMTV-TV Channel 33 in Madison, Wisconsin in 1953; now on Channel 15 and owned by Gray Television
- WOKY-TV Channel 19 in Milwaukee, Wisconsin in 1953, sold in 1954
- Telecuraçao, begun 1960
- Telearuba, begun 1963

A trade magazine advertisement for Bartell Family Radio in 1957

Gerald Bartell also appeared on air on these television stations, including one amusing episode in July 1961 when he interviewed Soviet cosmonaut Yuri Gagarin, who a few months earlier had become the first human to travel in outer space when he orbited the Earth. Gugarin was in Willemstad in Curaçao when Bartell was able to become the first American press member to get a private interview with the cosmonaut, apparently because Gugarin assumed Bartell was a Curaçao local and not an American. Gugarin told Bartell that he expected to fly to the Moon on his next assignment. With this being the height of the Space Race, in which the Soviets were ahead at the time, American interest in the interview was piqued and General Maxwell D. Taylor, a top military advisor to President John F. Kennedy, called Bartell to find out if Gagarin had revealed a Moon mission schedule and to find out the interviewer's impressions of the cosmonaut.

Gerald Bartell was president of the Bartell Group. In 1956, Broadcasting/Telecasting magazine said that he had "combined a talent for artistry, a perspicacity for business and a decided penchant for perfection into a small empire builder in the past nine years." During 1957 Bartell trade advertisements began to stress the notion of family radio, although Gerald Bartell later conceded that it was more of a marketing gimmick than a real difference in what music the station played. In any case, by 1958, Bartell Family Radio was termed by Billboard magazine to be "one of the most successful chains of radio stations in the industry."

== Pioneers of Top 40 radio ==
In time, pop music became the primary component of WOKY's schedule, with disc jockeys choosing the songs they played based on the Billboard and Cash Box best-seller charts and on local record sales. WOKY served as the city's premier hits-playing station during most of the 1960s and was known for much of that time as the "Mighty 92".

The Top 40 radio format was coming into being during the 1950s and on; Northern Michigan University scholar Charles F. Ganzert has written that the innovation of the Top 40 format helped keep radio a viable business after the advent of the television era. The format was not developed all in one place or at one time, and other contributors during this time including Todd Storz and Gordon McLendon as well as Plough Broadcasting, but Ganzert states that the Bartell Group made significant contributions as well. David T. MacFarland has also identified these four as the main creators of the format, with Gerald Bartell as the main force behind the Bartell Group and Harold Krelstein being the same for Plough. Music author Jim Curtis has written, "If we speak of pioneer innovations in Top 40, we must speak of three men: Todd Storz, Gordon McLendon, and Gerald Bartell." Storz and McLendon clearly got the most attention in the radio industry press for their actions, while Bartell got less and Plough none at all. However, Bartell may have benefited from Milwaukee being an out-of-the-way city and thus being able to innovate without purveyors of conventional wisdom telling him what could or could not be done.

In particular, while singing commercials had been heard on network broadcast radio before, Bartell stations pioneered the use of customized singing commercials on local radio. Bartell stations also established a "hot clock" where predetermined pieces of programming would happen at certain times in each hour. The personality of the disc jockey was important; the New York Times described the Bartell formula as being "built around the folksy disk-jockey whose musical offerings were interrupted hourly with brief, cacophonous outbursts of news."

In continuing on this pathway, WAPL radio made its on-air debut in 1952 operating on a frequency of 1570 under the ownership of the Bartell family. It focused on a music-and-news format.

KCBQ in San Diego, which Bartell bought in December 1955, became one of the nation's first rock 'n' roll stations, playing the music of Elvis Presley, Little Richard and others. This would be the home of one of the nation's pioneering Top 40 programming. It was the most popular station in the San Diego area, with an up to 30 percent share of the listening audience.

KYA in San Francisco, California was bought by the Bartells in 1958; Lee Bartell became president and general manager and the station switched to a Top 40 format. The Bartells sold it in 1962.

In 1958, Gerald Bartell gave a speech to the Wisconsin State Radio Listeners' League in which he discussed the always-present question of commercial appeal versus artistic value, saying that he realized that Jussi Björling or Arthur Rubinstein were clearly artistically superior to Liberace or Mario Lanza, but that in any form of art and entertainment, not just radio, "all in a measure stand or upon their degree of public acceptance. ... The audience is a great unsophisticated critic. It seems to know what it wants."

The Bartells were not always tied to the Top 40 format, however. In May 1959, Bartell Broadcasters acquired New York radio station WOV and then changed its call letters to WADO, with Melvin Bartell running it. The station focused on ethnic programming. During the day, WADO broadcast Top 40 and R&B music. At night, they ran Italian programming, which thus comprised half their programming. By 1962, some Spanish language programming was run on weekends. By 1963, the only English programming found on WADO was in Sunday religious broadcasts. In 1964, WADO began broadcasting completely in Spanish from 5 a.m. to 8 p.m., and Italian from 8 p.m. to midnight. Overnight, Asian programming was run. By 1966, the station was all Spanish.

Melvin said in general of the siblings' radio station approach: "It is for the whole family, with music for the family. The concept of the Bartell Group is something of interest for everybody, of music, features, news and editorials."

== Macfadden-Bartell era ==
Until 1960, Bartell Broadcasting Corporation was privately owned. In that year, it became a public company, listed on the over-the-counter market based in New York. For its fiscal year ending June 30, 1960, Bartell Broadcasting's gross income was about $3.1 million, up from $2.7 million the year before.

In February 1961, Bartell acquired a controlling interest in Macfadden Publications. However, due to delays cause by a shareholder suit that was eventually resolved, the merger did not become effective until a year later, when the new company became known as Macfadden-Bartell. Gerald became chairman of the company, Lee the president, and Melvin the secretary. Macfadden-Bartell was listed on the American Stock Exchange.

As Financial World magazine noted, while at the time it was common for magazine publishers to buy broadcasting companies to expand their communications offerings, this was a case of the reverse happening. Macfadden's pulp magazine business had been in decline, much as the radio business had been in the 1940s and 1950s with the advent of television; as The New York Times said, "The rise of the Bartells stems from a rather simple, if harrowing, formula. They specialize in buying into an industry after other entrepreneurs have decided that the industry is in decline." Initial results of Macfadden-Bartell were positive, with revenues up to nearly $26 million and profits rising by 1963. Lee Bartell said, "What we intend to do is to build a total communications complex."

In 1965, Macfadden-Bartell was renamed to the Bartell Media Corporation. Melvin becomes executive vice president of Bartell Media Corporation, while Ralph Evans had the position of Vice President for Engineering with it. Bartell Media expanded on Macfadden's book publishing imprint, Bartholomew House – initially used by Macfadden to group together stories from its magazines into a book (as in Magic Cook Book from the food editors of True Story magazine, Great Western Heroes) – the imprint expanded into first editions of new material after the purchase by the Bartell Group (Coffee, Tea or Me?, Mannequin: My Life as a Model).

For the first half of 1967, Bartell Media Corporation reported revenues of $15 million and earnings of $200,000. But then in November 1967, the brokerage firm Weis, Voisin, Cannon purchased additional stock such that the siblings were for the first time now in the minority, owning only 35–40 percent of the company. There was a shuffle at the directors level and Melvin and David Bartell were no longer officers of the company, leaving only Gerald and Lee in positions at that level.

During 1968, Downe Communications acquired 32 percent of Bartell Media Corporation, as part of a struggle for executive control of the company, which Downe prevailed in. All of the Bartell siblings and in-laws resigned or retired from their positions in Bartell Media Corporation, and a new president, Earl H. Tiffany, was named for Bartell Media Corporation. Gerald did retain a title of executive consultant.

After that, the Bartell Media Corporation continued on as a publicly visible entity, but without the involvement of any of the Bartell siblings. Further ownership of Bartell by Downe Communications was approved by federal regulators in 1969.

== Later years ==
Lee Bartell subsequently became a force in the San Diego area hotel industry, including ownership of the Humphrey's Half Moon Inn and the La Jolla Village Inn. In 1976, Lee Bartell got back into the radio business with station KMJC 910 "Magic 91" in San Diego. Thus, there was a confusing situation where a Bartell owned a radio station but no Bartells owned the radio stations under the Bartell Media Corporation name. By 1978 the latter was known as Downe Broadcasting and the last vestiges of the Bartell name were gone. Lee Bartell sold KMJC in 1989. He died in San Diego in 1991 at age 81.

Gerald Bartell remained active in the arts, including areas that reflected on the Jewish experience. During a 1972 interview with a scholar he seemed to express regret regarding his days in marketing his radio stations, saying "I'm glad to get the hell out of it, frankly. I never felt real clean doing it. I never felt as if I were doing the best work that I could do. I feel much more competent doing other things like work in the arts and drama." He died in 1990, in Wisconsin at age 76.

By 1991 Melvin was retired and living in San Diego, where much of the extended family gradually migrated to. He died in 2006 at age 89.

David Bartell had remained a lawyer; he generally had less to do with the radio business than the other siblings. He died in San Diego in 2006 at age 97.

Ralph Evans founded an engineering consulting firm, Evans and Associates, which provided services to both public organizations and agencies. He died in Wisconsin in 2005 at the age of 86. His wife Rosa Evans also worked for Evans and Associates and was active in local Jewish organizations. She died in Wisconsin as well in 2009 at age 90.

== Legacy ==
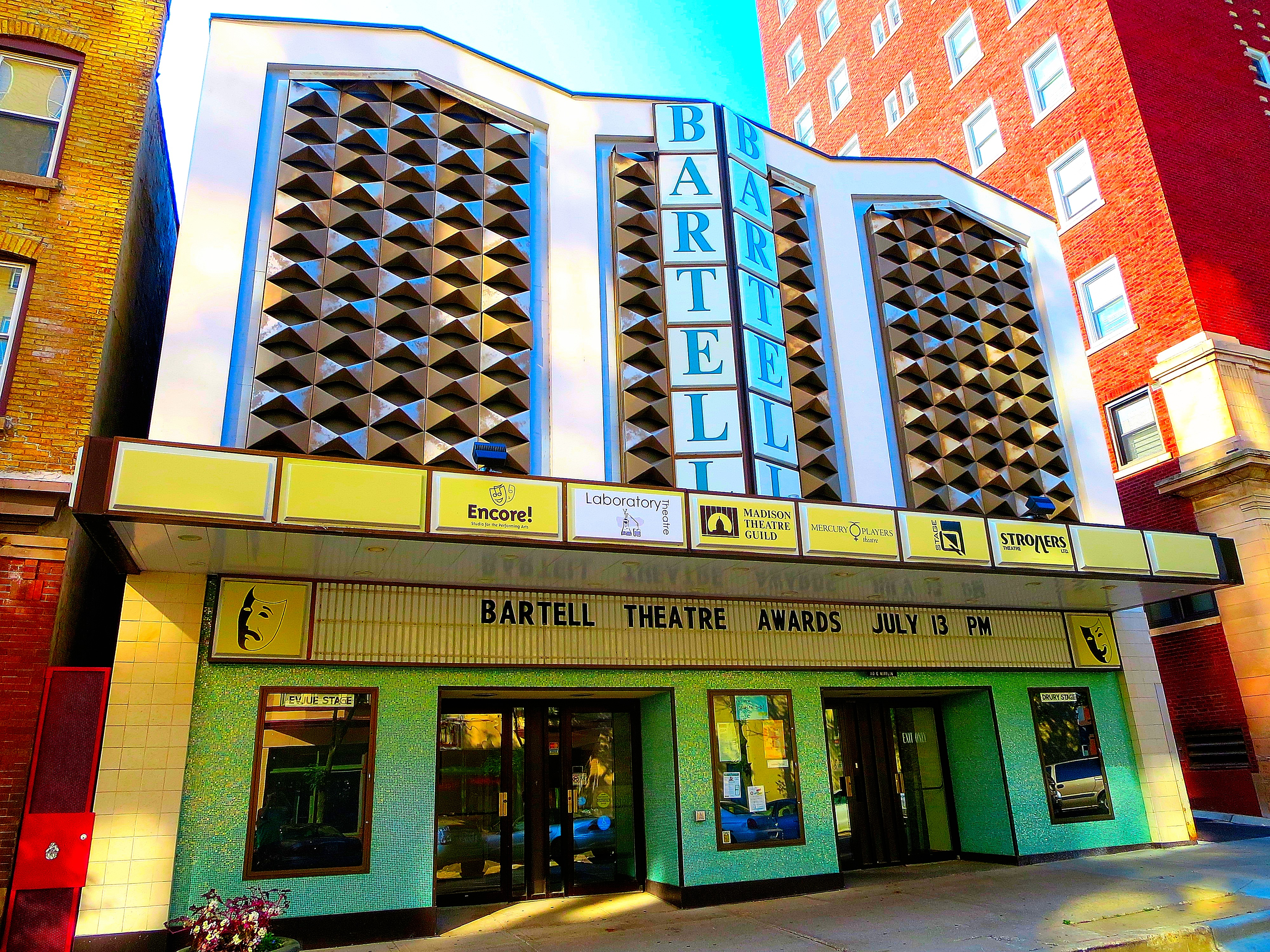
The Bartell Theatre in Madison, Wisconsin, here seen in 2013, is named after Gerald Bartell.

The Bartell Group is credited with being one of the inventors of the Top 40 radio format.

In 2010, a monument to KCBQ was put up in the Santee suburb of San Diego, honoring the station and Lee Bartell's role with it.

While many of the Bartell-owned radio stations have switch formats since that era, WADO in New York is still a Spanish-language station.

Gerald Bartell and Rosa Bartell Evans have both been inducted into the Wisconsin Broadcasters Hall of Fame, as has Ralph Evans.

The Bartell Theatre in Madison, Wisconsin is named after Gerald and is run by the Gerald A. Bartell Community Theatre Foundation. Gerald Bartell has been described in that city's Isthmus newspaper as a "Madison theater legend and arts supporter."

The Joyce J. and Gerald A. Bartell Award in the Arts is given out yearly by the University of Wisconsin, as one of several awards with which the university's Arts Institute "recognizes achievements and professional service, along with supporting future creative endeavors and research."
