= WOKW (Wisconsin) =

Sturgeon Bay, Wisconsin; United States
- Frequency: 1260 kHz

Ownership
- Owner: Door County Radio Co.

History
- First air date: May 6, 1951
- Last air date: May 2, 1957
- Former frequencies: 1050 kHz (1951–1955)

Technical information
- Power: 1,000 watts (daytime only)

WOKW was a radio station located in Sturgeon Bay, Wisconsin, United States, initially on 1050 AM before moving to 1260 AM on August 17, 1955, at 12:15 p.m. The station, which began broadcasting on May 6, 1951, was owned by Door County Radio Co., co-owned with the biweekly Door County Advocate newspaper, with a minority ownership held by the Bartell Group. That same year, two of the original stockholders, Mr. and Mrs. Sumner Harris, were killed in their home. Their son, Chandler F. Harris, became the controlling stockholder by then also buying out Bartell's shares; Bartell had agreed to be a part-owner long enough to get the station established.

WOKW ceased broadcasting on May 2, 1957, and merged with the other station in Sturgeon Bay, WDOR. A merger of the two stations had been discussed for two years, as it was felt that the community could not sustain both of them.
