= Edouard Izac =

American politician and US Navy Medal of Honor recipient (1891–1990)

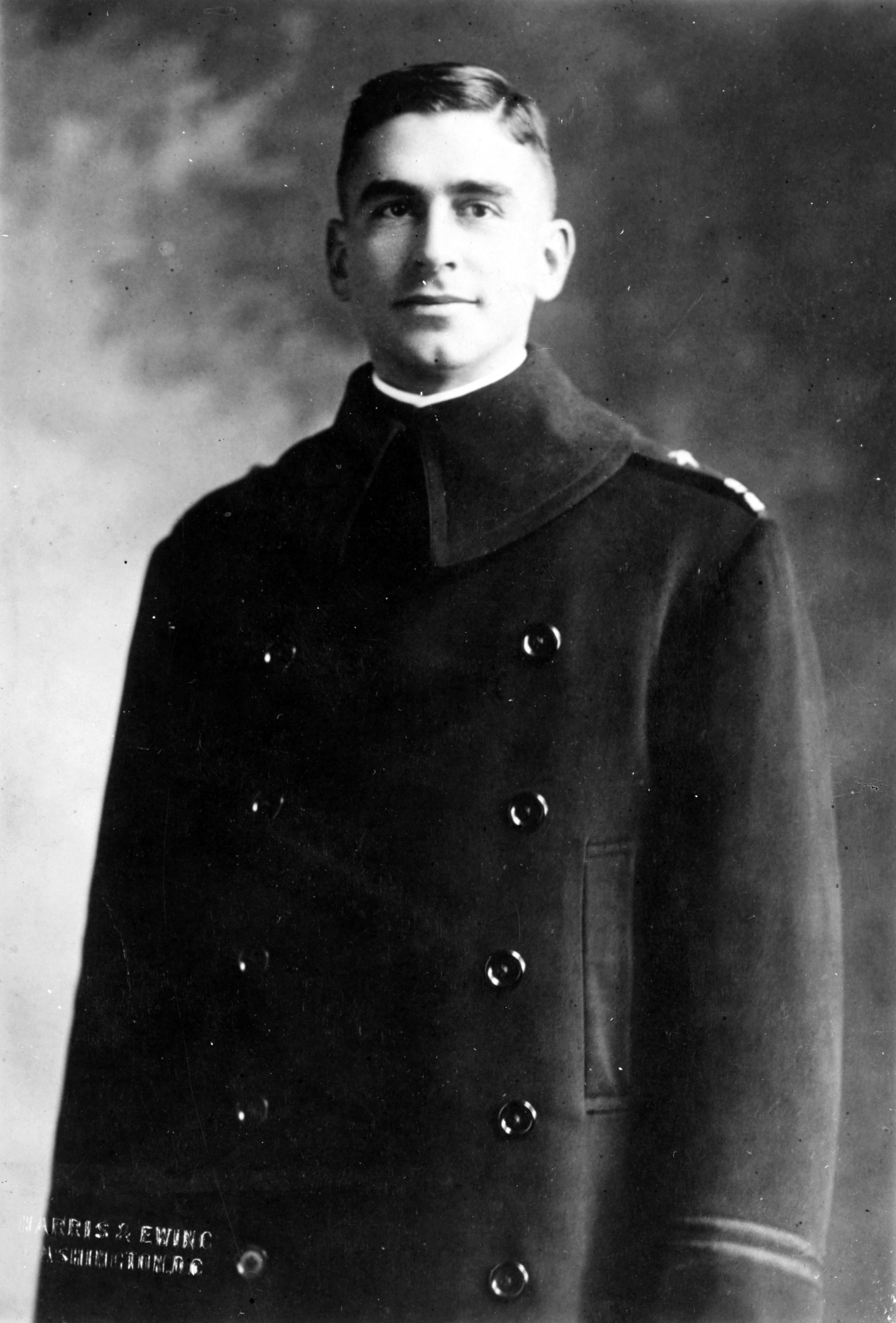

Member of the U.S. House of Representatives from California
- In office January 3, 1937 – January 3, 1947
- Preceded by: George Burnham
- Succeeded by: Charles K. Fletcher
- Constituency: 20th district (1937–1943); 23rd district (1943–1947)

Personal details
- Born: Edouard Victor Michel Izac; December 18, 1891 Cresco, Iowa, US
- Died: January 18, 1990 (aged 98) Fairfax, Virginia, US
- Resting place: Arlington National Cemetery
- Party: Democratic
- Other political affiliations: Progressive (1934)
- Awards: Medal of Honor; Croce di Guerra al Merito (Italy); Cross of Montenegro

Military service
- Allegiance: United States
- Branch/service: United States Navy
- Years of service: 1915–1921
- Rank: Lieutenant commander
- Battles/wars: World War I

Edouard Victor Michel Izac (December 18, 1891 – January 18, 1990) was a lieutenant in the United States Navy during World War I and a Medal of Honor recipient. From 1937 to 1947, he served five terms as a U.S. House Representative from California.

He was posted to the troop transport USS President Lincoln in 1918 when that ship was sunk by German submarine U-90. Taken as a prisoner of war, and not letting his captors know that he spoke German, Izac gathered intelligence on the submarine and its crew before being transferred to prison camps in Germany, from where he escaped in October 1918.

At the time of his death in 1990, he was the last living Medal of Honor recipient from World War I.

== Early years ==
Edouard Victor Michel Izac was born on December 18, 1891 in Cresco, Iowa, the youngest of nine children to Balthazar Izac, a builder of farm wagons, and Mathilda Geuth. His father emigrated to the United States from Alsace-Lorraine in 1852 amid instability from the coup d'état instigated by Napoleon III, while his mother was born in Philadelphia to a family that immigrated from Baden-Württemberg. Balthazar Izac's name was changed to Isaacs by immigration officials as he entered the country, and all of his children except for Edouard adopted this spelling of the name as well. The family spoke an Alsatian dialect of German at home, and Izac learned to speak French early in his life.

Izac attended the School of the Assumption in Cresco, before moving to attend high school in South St. Paul, Minnesota. He decided to enter the United States Naval Academy to get a "complete education," seeing private colleges as out of reach. After securing a recommendation from a Congressman in Chicago, he was appointed to the academy. Izac did not excel in academics at the Academy, however he did meet Agnes Cabell, daughter of General DeRosey Caroll Cabell, at a dance. Izac graduated the Academy in 1915, and he and Cabell were married the next day.

== Military service ==
Following his graduation, Izac was assigned to the battleship USS Florida, as the United States began its involvement in World War I. When he was promoted from ensign to lieutenant (junior grade), he signed up for the Naval Transport Service, hoping for assignments less open-ended than battleship duty. During this time, his daughter Cabell was born in 1916. He transferred to the troop transport USS President Lincoln in July 1917, and helped to oversee the conversion of that ship from an ocean liner to a ship of war, duties which kept the ship in drydock until its maiden voyage on 18 October. The ship subsequently undertook four uneventful trips to Europe, including one in November 1917 escorting U.S. Representative Clarence B. Miller.

=== Capture and escape ===
By the ship's fifth voyage, Izac was its executive officer. During this voyage, the ship successfully ferried troops to Brest, France, on May 23, 1918, and began the return trip, in convoy, to New York City on May 29. The next day, the destroyer escort for the convoy departed, leaving four troopships to cross the sea alone. Izac was in command of the guns on the afterdeck. A submarine was spotted early in the morning on May 31 and the ships attempted to evade it unsuccessfully. President Lincoln was 600 miles (970 km) from the coast of France when it was struck by three torpedoes at a range of about 1,000 yards (910 m) at 08:54 by German submarine U-90. By 09:15, her captain, Commander Percy Wright Foote ordered the ship abandoned. President Lincoln rolled starboard at 09:30 and sank, but only took 26 men in a crew of 700 with her. The rest remained in lifeboats as the rest of the convoy headed to a safe distance, as was policy at the time. U-90 then surfaced, attempting to locate the ship's captain, but was unable to do so, pulling Izac out of a lifeboat instead because its crew recognized his officers' insignia. Izac was taken as a prisoner of war after lying to the sub's crew that the captain had gone down with the ship. He was subsequently held in quarters aboard the ship while it dived 200 feet (61 m) to avoid depth charges from the pursuing USS Smith.

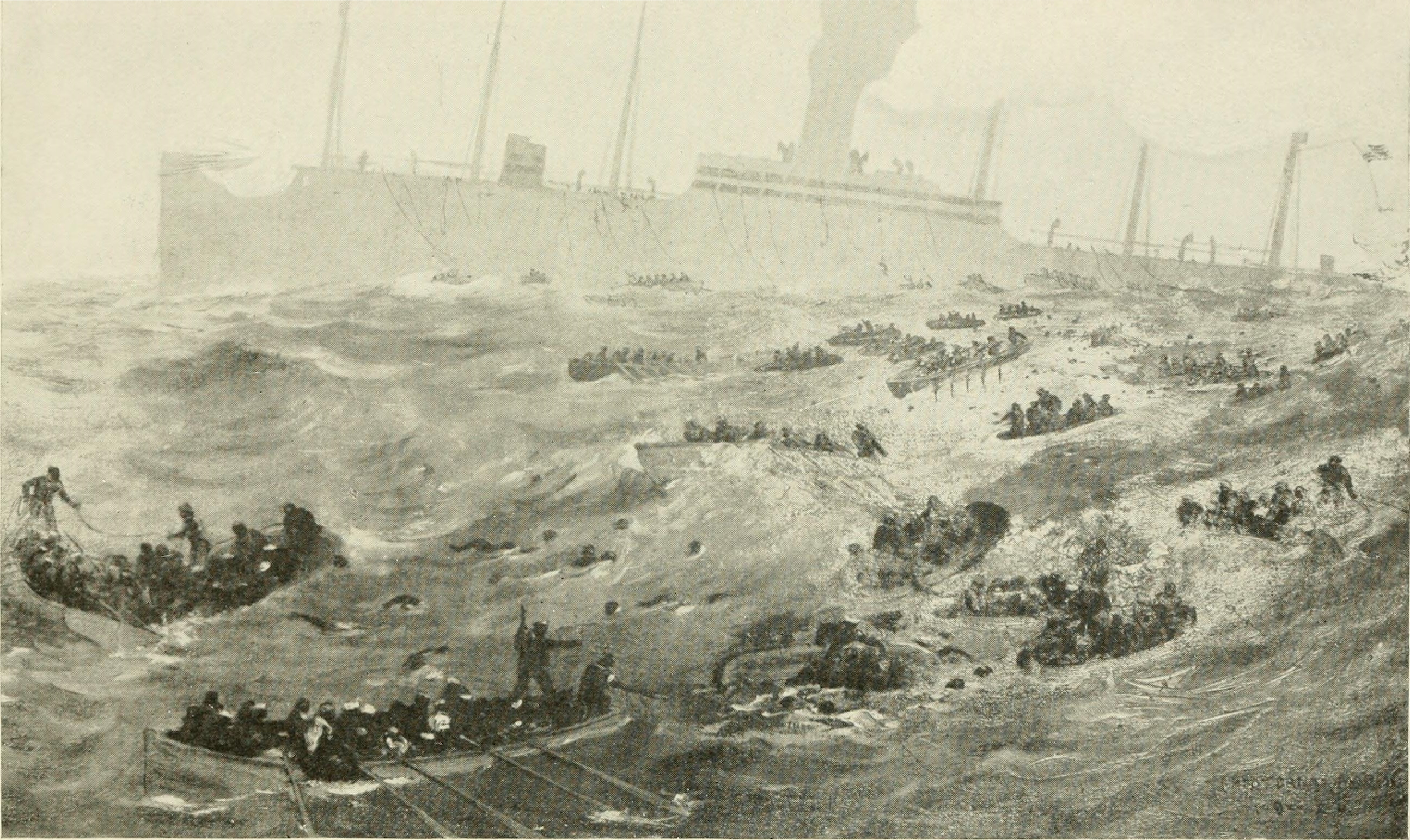
Sinking of the USS President Lincoln

Izac later recalled that he was treated well while a prisoner, dining with the ship's officers and playing bridge and other card games with the crew. During political discussions on the boat, he also learned about the German mindset and conditions for German U-Boat crews, which were generally superior to conditions in other ships at the time. During this time, he began to take mental notes of the submarine and the routines and operations of her crew, hoping to gather intelligence that could be useful against German submarine efforts. He concealed his knowledge of German language which he used to listen in on the crew. Using maps and binoculars borrowed from the crew, Izac was able to ascertain the ship's return route to Kiel, which took it north of the Shetland Islands, into the North Sea and past Skagerrack and Kattegat in a bid to avoid minefields and patrols. He also learned of a rendezvous point used by U-boats near Denmark to avoid patrols, though was thwarted in his first escape attempt there. He also learned of at least one island where sub crews were commonly landing to poach mutton, which he considered ideal for a trap. Arriving in Kiel on June 10, he was transferred to SMS Preussen, on which he was ferried to a prison camp in Karlsruhe. Conditions there were more difficult and the prisoners were fed less, so he tried unsuccessfully to escape again.

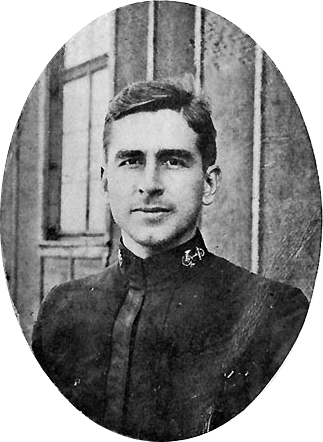
Izac at Villingen, 1918

Four weeks later, as Izac was moved to Villingen by train, he attempted to escape again by jumping headfirst out of a window as the train was traveling 40 miles per hour (64 km/h) but struck his head and knees on the railroad ties and was caught and beaten by guards for the attempt, then forced to run the remaining 5 miles (8.0 km) to the prison camp. Bedridden by his injuries for three weeks, he was then sentenced to two weeks of solitary confinement. Izac would be unable to bend his knees for two months. During his initial recapture, a guard broke his rifle striking Izac and was court martialed for destruction of military property; after the war Izac sought damages from a claims commission and was awarded $27,000 for the incident. By the time he left solitary confinement, Izac had lost 30 pounds (14 kg) and weighed 120 pounds (54 kg). Conditions in this camp were more harsh and Izac prepared to escape here by walking, running, and weightlifting as he continued his recovery. But conditions at the camp continued to deteriorate, especially for the Russian prisoners of war.

On the night of October 6, Izac and a group of American prisoners succeeded in a mass escape from the prison by cutting power and leaving the premises dressed as German guards. To avoid dogs and other pursuers, he and another American officer, Harold Buckley Willis, hiked a roundabout route to Switzerland. They traveled through the Black Forest and along the Alb, followed a rail line and crossed the Rhine River, crossing the border early in the morning of 13 October. Their path had taken them through 120 miles (190 km) even though a direct route from the camp to the closest Swiss border was 18 miles (29 km) away. They survived on raw vegetables along the way. From the crossing he was taken to the American Embassy in Bern, where he was given money by the American Red Cross to travel to Paris, which he reached on 22 October. From there, he was taken to London, where he met with Admiral William Sims on 23 October, and finally returned to the Bureau of Navigation, arriving on November 11, 1918, Armistice Day.

=== Medal of Honor ===
Welcomed to the Department of the Navy as a hero, Izac was promoted to lieutenant commander within a few months and assigned to a prestigious post as the director of munitions at the Navy Yard in Washington, D.C., moving there with his family. He was subsequently awarded the Medal of Honor by Assistant Secretary of the Navy Franklin D. Roosevelt on November 11, 1920, with whom he became friends. In addition, he was awarded the Italian Croce di Guerra and the Cross of Montenegro. However, the injuries he sustained to his knees in his escape attempts ended his Navy career and Izac was forced to retire.

Living only on a small pension, Izac moved his family to a home of his father-in-law in San Diego, where he took a job selling ads for the San Diego Union from 1922 to 1929, during which time he also began working as a freelance writer, focused mainly on subjects on problems of war veterans, history, and English. The newspaper job was lost following the Wall Street Crash of 1929, and he briefly moved the family to rural France, living simply, likely off of the money awarded from the German government.

== Political career ==
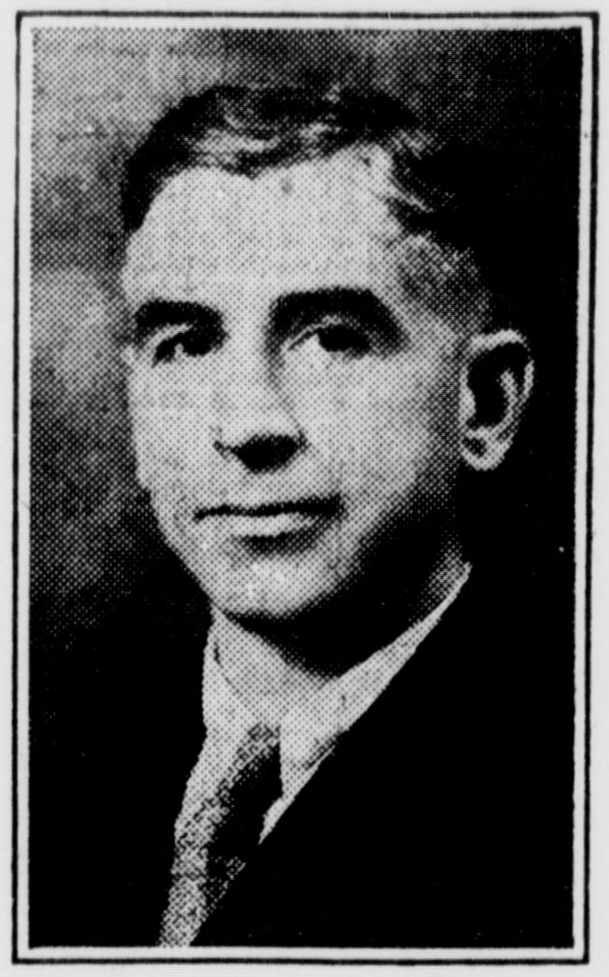
Izac c. 1934

Izac returned to San Diego in 1931. Three years later, a group of veterans in the city convinced him to run for Congress in California's 20th congressional district. He secured nominations from both the Democratic and Progressive parties, but ultimately lost the election to Republican George Burnham.

Campaigning again in 1936, Izac changed his strategy and used his war record and Medal of Honor award as selling points in his political campaign. He retold the story of his capture in various rallies, becoming noted for his animation while speaking. A supporter of Roosevelt's New Deal policies, Izac promoted a policy of neutrality, support for veterans, and advocated for a larger military presence in San Diego as an economic anchor. During the campaign, he raised $40 each from a group of 40 veterans under the condition of repaying them should he lose. Crafting a political image that tied him as a friend to Roosevelt, a patriot and with first-hand experience in poverty, he won the election in 1936.

=== Congress ===
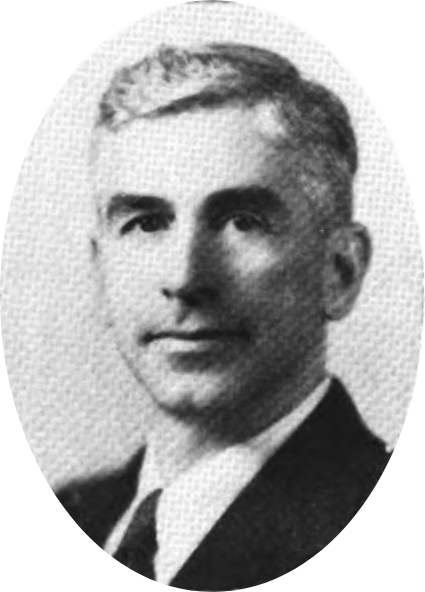
Izac in Congress c. 1938

Sworn in to the Seventy-fifth Congress, Izac advocated for non-interventionalism in World War II. In his first speech on the House floor, Izac said the path the nation was on would lead to its involvement in the conflict, which elicited substantial coverage from The New York Times. Among other acts, he introduced legislation calling for the protection of the Palomar Observatory, establishment of a U.S. Marine Corps hospital in San Diego, aid for construction of public schools, and to add a battalion of African American soldiers in the then-segregated California Army National Guard. Veterans were a substantial focus of his legislative efforts. He introduced legislation including disabled veterans and their families in New Deal and other appropriations. He was a delegate to the Democratic National Conventions in 1940 and 1944.

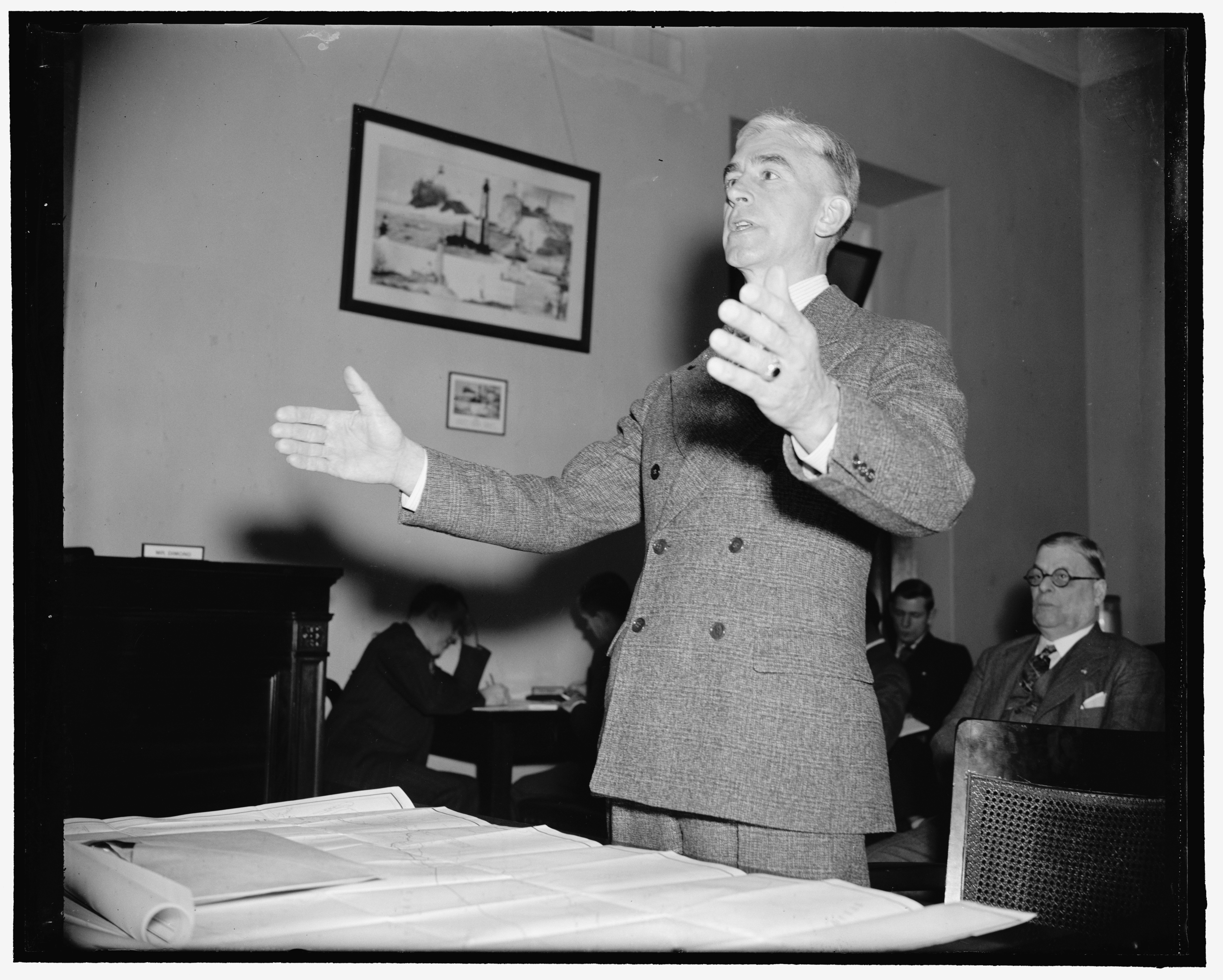
Izac speaks in favor of a Nicaragua Canal before the House Merchant Marine Committee, March 14, 1939

Serving on the House Naval Affairs Committee, Izac was considered a potential candidate for greater positions of power. His name came up in 1940 as possible candidate to become the Assistant Secretary for the Navy, but Izac publicly announced at the time that he wanted to remain in Congress, in a role that was focused on support of veterans. He eventually became chair of the House Naval Affairs Committee, and in this role he had an oversight role in military efforts to defense matters on the Pacific coast and was also involved in questioning Lieutenant General John L. DeWitt over the internment of Japanese Americans. This duty sent him on inspection tours of U.S. bases in the Pacific during the war. He also pushed against efforts for a post-war downsizing of U.S. military bases in the Pacific.

It was around this time that Izac's popularity began to wane for his growing Leftward-leaning liberal positions in Congress. His voting record came under scrutiny by the San Diego Union, in part for his opposition to permanent status for the House Un-American Activities Committee and for his protests against the deportation of prominent West Coast union leader Harry Bridges. Izac subsequently won re-election by smaller margins. He had won his 1938 re-election campaign by 20,000 votes in a vote of 58,806 to 38,333, but was re-elected by just 4,373 votes in 1940, and re-elected by only 777 votes in 1942 in a close election that came down to the count of absentee ballots. Izac despised Adolf Hitler but nonetheless never advocated for entering the war against him, and his isolationist views were increasingly unpopular in favor of national unity to support the war effort, especially after the attack on Pearl Harbor. In 1942 following redistricting, Izac shifted to the 23rd congressional district, and Republican Carl Hinshaw replaced him in the 20th congressional district.

In 1945, General Dwight Eisenhower suggested to Army Chief of Staff George C. Marshall that legislative representatives be brought to Europe to learn about the concentration camps being found there firsthand. Izac was one of a group of 12 Congressmen and Senators sent to the European Theater of Operations, where they toured Buchenwald, Nordhausen, and Dachau concentration camps, learning of the conditions directly from a number of the survivors, an experience that deeply impacted Izac and led to his belief that "terroristic and fanatical" members of the Nazi Party should be "eliminated" rather than reintegrated as part of denazification. He was also a believer in more harsh punishment for the German people in the name of justice, though he knew such sanctions were unlikely. The group penned a report, Atrocities and other Conditions in Concentration Camps in Germany.

In 1946, he was present at Operation Crossroads, observing nuclear weapons tests on a fleet of 90 Navy vessels at Bikini Atoll. Izac observed the tests aboard the USS Panamint, 22 miles (35 km) from the epicenter of the blasts, but said little of his reaction to the weapons.

Izac's 1946 re-election campaign pitted him against Republican Charles K. Fletcher, a banker who focused on local issues, differentiating him from Izac, who felt they should be addressed by local bodies, rather than federal government. Fletcher defeated Izac gaining 69,411 votes to Izac's 53,898 and was elected to the Eightieth Congress.

=== Later life ===
Later in life, Izac chose to downplay the accomplishments of the Medal of Honor again. After leaving office, he moved his family to land inherited from his father-in-law in Gordonsville, Virginia, where Izac became a farmer and led a simple life raising cattle and growing different kinds of fruit and vegetables. The family then grew most of its own food and survived on pensions from the Navy and Congress. At one point, he dammed a stream to make a small lake, which has since been known as Lake Izac. In retirement the family also took to traveling, visiting Jerusalem almost every year and using these visits as the basis for a 1965 book, The Holy Land: Then and Now. Of the book, he later said, "No one who has not visited the most momentous events in the history of the human race will ever be able to visualize just how it all happened. You simply have to go there."

In 1952, one of Izac's sons, 19-year-old Forrest, died in what the coroner ruled a suicide. His youngest son, Andre, eventually joined the Navy as a chaplain and served aboard the USS Abraham Lincoln. He later lived in Bethesda, Maryland, in the 1960s. An accident following the death of his wife in 1970 led him to live with his second daughter, Anna for the remainder of his life, in Fairfax, Virginia. By 1989 he was the oldest living Medal of Honor recipient and his 99th birthday was noted by Willard Scott on Today.

== Death and burial ==
Izac died in his sleep of congestive heart failure on January 18, 1990. At the time of his death, he was the last living Medal of Honor recipient from World War I. He was buried at Arlington National Cemetery, in Arlington, Virginia.

== Medal of Honor citation ==
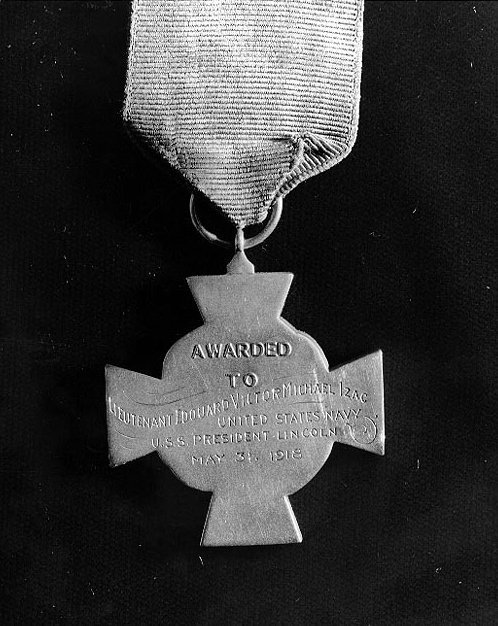
Reverse of Izac's Medal of Honor. He received the "Tiffany Cross" version of the medal.

Rank and organization: Lieutenant, U.S. Navy. Place and date: Aboard German submarine U-90 as prisoner of war, May 21, 1918. Entered service at: Illinois. Born: December 18, 1891, Cresco, Howard County, Iowa.

Citation:

When the U.S.S. President Lincoln was attacked and sunk by the German submarine U-90, on May 21, 1918, Lt. Izac was captured and held as a prisoner on board the U-90 until the return of the submarine to Germany, when he was confined in the prison camp. During his stay on the U-90 he obtained information of the movements of German submarines which was so important that he was determined to escape, with a view to making this information available to the U.S. and Allied Naval authorities. In attempting to carry out this plan, he jumped through the window of a rapidly moving train at the imminent risk of death, not only from the nature of the act itself but from the fire of the armed German soldiers who were guarding him. Having been recaptured and reconfined, Lt. Izac made a second and successful attempt to escape, breaking his way through barbed-wire fences and deliberately drawing the fire of the armed guards in the hope of permitting others to escape during the confusion. He made his way through the mountains of southwestern Germany, having only raw vegetables for food, and at the end, swam the River Rhine during the night in the immediate vicinity of German sentries.

== Electoral history ==
1936 United States House of Representatives elections in California, 20th district
Party	Candidate	Votes	%
Democratic	Edouard Izac	59,208	56.4
Republican	Ed P. Simple	44,925	42.8
Communist	Esco L. Richardson	916	0.8
Total votes		105,049	100.0
Democratic gain from Republican			

1938 United States House of Representatives elections in California, 20th district
Party	Candidate	Votes	%
Democratic	Edouard Izac (Incumbent)	65,243	60.4
Republican	John L. Bacon	42,710	39.6
Total votes		107,953	100.0
Democratic hold			

1940 United States House of Representatives elections in California, 20th district
Party	Candidate	Votes	%
Democratic	Edouard Izac (Incumbent)	69,874	51.1
Republican	John L. Bacon	66,132	48.3
Communist	Esco L. Richardson	806	0.6
Total votes		136,812	100.0
Democratic hold			

1942 election
Party	Candidate	Votes	%
Democratic	Edouard Izac (Incumbent)	42,864	50.5%
Republican	James B. Abbey	42,087	49.5%
Total votes		84,951	100.0%
Turnout			
Democratic hold			

1944 election
Party	Candidate	Votes	%
Democratic	Edouard Izac (Incumbent)	86,707	55.1%
Republican	James B. Abbey	70,787	44.9%
Total votes		157,494	100.0%
Turnout			
Democratic hold			

1946 election
Party	Candidate	Votes	%
Republican	Charles K. Fletcher	69,411	56.3%
Democratic	Edouard Izac (Incumbent)	53,898	43.7%
Total votes		123,309	100.0%
Turnout			
Republican gain from Democratic			

== See also ==
- List of Medal of Honor recipients
- List of Medal of Honor recipients for World War I

== Footnotes ==
U.S. House of Representatives
Preceded by George Burnham	Member of the U.S. House of Representatives from California's 20th congressional district 1937–1943	Succeeded by John Carl Hinshaw
Preceded by New district	Member of the U.S. House of Representatives from California's 23rd congressional district 1943–1947	Succeeded by Charles K. Fletcher
