= Charles K. Fletcher =

American politician (1902–1985)

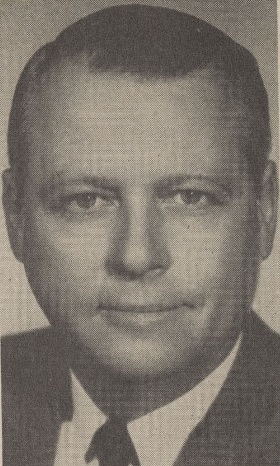
- From 1947's Pictorial Directory of the 80th Congress

Member of the U.S. House of Representatives from California's 23rd district
- In office January 3, 1947 – January 3, 1949
- Preceded by: Edouard Izac
- Succeeded by: Clinton D. McKinnon

Personal details
- Born: December 15, 1902 San Diego, California, US
- Died: September 29, 1985 (aged 82) San Diego, California, US
- Party: Republican

Charles Kimball Fletcher (December 15, 1902 – September 29, 1985) was an American soldier, banker and politician.

== Early life ==
Fletcher was born on December 15, 1902, to Ed and Mary C. Fletcher, in San Diego. He graduated from San Diego High School where he set several swimming records, including an unofficial world record time in the 220 yard breaststroke. Fletcher went on to Stanford University, where he was captain of the school's water polo team, which won the national championship in 1924, the year he graduated. He is a member of both the Stanford Athletic Hall of Fame and the San Diego Hall of Champions.

Fletcher also attended Pembroke College, Oxford University, England, in 1934.

== Early career ==
After graduation, he went into the savings and loan business. He founded Home Federal Savings and Loan Association in 1934, serving as its president until 1959 when he became chairman of the board of directors.

=== World War II ===
During World War II, Fletcher served as a lieutenant with the United States Naval Reserve from 1943 to 1945.

=== State commission ===
He served as a member of California Commission on Correctional Facilities and Services from 1955 to 1957.

== Political career ==
Fletcher sought nomination for the U.S. House in 1944, coming in second for the Republican nomination and a very distant second for the Democratic nomination in California's cross-filing system. He was elected to the 80th United States Congress, serving one term from 1947 to 1949. He lost his bid for reelection in 1948. Charles Fletcher was a savings and loan man, which meant a holder of mortgages, and housing was his focus in an 80th Congress that badly needed to focus on housing, its shortage and its rising cost. His solution was the free market; if housing costs increased there would be more incentive for the private sector to build housing. He strove to eliminate controls on rents but also to provide more Federal guarantees of mortgages. And he opposed public housing, which he called “political housing.”

== Personal life ==
Fletcher married Jeannette Toberman, the daughter of "Mr. Hollywood" Charles E. Toberman in 1926. The couple's son, Charles K. "Kim" Jr., was chair of Home Federal. They also had another son and daughter: Peter and Dale. They lived in San Diego until his death from cancer on September 29, 1985, aged 82. He was cremated and the ashes were scattered off the coast of Del Mar, California.

== Electoral history ==
1946 election
Party	Candidate	Votes	%
Republican	Charles K. Fletcher	69,411	56.3%
Democratic	Edouard Izac (Incumbent)	53,898	43.7%
Total votes		123,309	100.0%
Turnout			
Republican gain from Democratic			

1948 election
Party	Candidate	Votes	%
Democratic	Clinton D. McKinnon	112,534	55.8%
Republican	Charles K. Fletcher (Incumbent)	87,138	43.2%
Progressive	Harry C. Steinmetz	2,017	1.0%
Total votes		201,689	100.0%
Turnout			
Democratic gain from Republican			

U.S. House of Representatives
Preceded by Edouard V. M. Izac	Member of the U.S. House of Representatives from California's 23rd congressional district 1947-1949	Succeeded by Clinton D. McKinnon
