= KECR =

Family Radio station in El Cajon, California, United States

El Cajon, California; United States
- Broadcast area: San Diego, California
- Frequency: 910 kHz

Programming
- Languages: English
- Format: Christian radio
- Network: Family Radio

Ownership
- Owner: Family Radio; (Loam Media, Inc.)

History
- First air date: 1955; 70 years ago
- Former call signs: KDEO (1955–1977); KMJC (1977–1990)
- Call sign meaning: El Cajon Radio or disambiguation of sister station KEAR

Technical information
- Licensing authority: FCC
- Facility ID: 20977
- Class: B
- Power: 5,000 watts
- Transmitter coordinates: 32°53′44.2″N 116°55′34.1″W

Links
- Public license information: Public file; LMS
- Webcast: Listen live
- Website: www.familyradio.org

KECR (910 AM) is a radio station licensed to El Cajon, California and serving the San Diego radio market. Owned by Family Radio, it carries a Christian talk and teaching radio format, along with traditional hymns and worship music. Programming comes from Family Radio, based in Franklin, Tennessee.

KECR broadcasts at 5,000 watts, using a directional antenna. The transmitter site is near Moreno Avenue, north of Lakeside, California, near California State Route 67. No local programming originates here, as the station airs the Family Radio Network continuously, except for the station identification. It does however, have a backup radio studio at its transmission site, which is mainly used to carry out messages from the Emergency Alert System. The seven-tower array transmitter site is shared with AM 1170 KCBQ, another Christian Radio station, owned by the Salem Media Group.

== History ==
=== Early years ===
==== KDEO (1955–1970) ====
This station signed on in 1955. In its early years, it was a Top 40 station with the call sign KDEO. It used the moniker "Radio Kay-dee-oh".

KDEO was the first radio station to broadcast the countdown program American Top 40 with Casey Kasem, on July 3, 1970. The premiere of the program coincided with the Independence Day holiday that year.

==== Magic (1971–1979) ====
By 1971 the station rebranded as Magic 91 (referencing its AM frequency). On March 1, 1977, it switched its call letters to KMJC. The station continued its Top 40 format. The Magic branding would eventually end up on XHRM-FM 92.5 in 1998.

=== Religious era ===
==== Independent (1980–1989) ====
As music migrated to FM radio, the owners decided to adopt a new format. In 1980, KMJC flipped to Christian programming, call letters' meaning to "King and Master, Jesus Christ" to match the new format. It remained independent from any religious network throughout the 1980s.

==== Acquisition by Family Stations (1989–1994) ====
Bartell Hotels agreed to sell KMJC to Family Stations in November 1989. In April 1990, Family changed the call sign to KECR, as it began operating it with programming from Family Radio.

==== FM station divestiture (1995–2002) ====
The programs were originally fed from 93.3 KECR-FM, which was soon put up for sale. When the simulcast ended in 1995, Jacor Communications acquired the FM station, which subsequently became a CHR station (now KHTS-FM) in 1996.

==== Recent history (2003–present) ====
During the October 2003 Cedar Fires, part of KECR's rural transmitter site was destroyed by flames. One tower (out of seven) and an electrical shack were completely destroyed. This happened after chief engineer Jeff Zimmer rejected a staff announcer's recommendation to mow down brush within 30 feet (9.1 m) of the towers and transmitter shacks. Weeks later, the station transmitter site was repaired and the signal restored to full power.

=== FM translator ===
Family Stations planned to give KECR an FM translator at 100.1 FM. An application was filed on January 28, 2018, as part of a new spectrum auction. On July 3, 2019, the Federal Communications Commission (FCC) announced that Family Radio had won the spectrum auction for a fee of $35,000. This new translator was to be located atop Mount San Miguel. In March 2025, Family Stations returned the construction permit for the translator—which was set to expire the following month, and was by then proposed to operate at 101.1 FM as K266DD—to the FCC.
