= Jack Smith (columnist) =

American journalist and author (1916–1996)

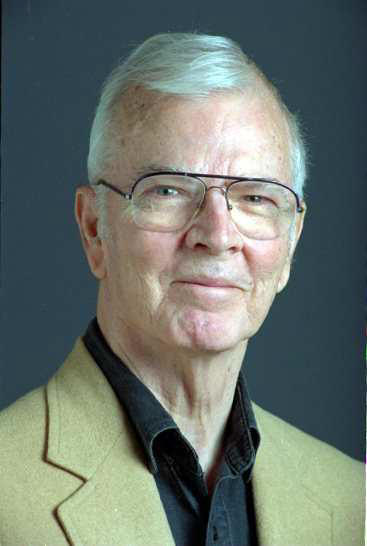
- Born: Jack Clifford Smith; August 27, 1916; Long Beach, California, U.S.
- Died: January 9, 1996 (aged 79); Los Angeles, California, U.S.
- Occupations: Journalist, writer, reporter, columnist

Jack Clifford Smith (August 27, 1916 – January 9, 1996) was a Los Angeles journalist, author, and newspaper columnist. His daily column, which ran in the Los Angeles Times for 37 years, expressed "keen observations of the life he loved in ever-surprising Southern California" and was described by former Los Angeles Times Editor Shelby Coffey III as "one of the abiding highlights of the Los Angeles Times." Smith was the author of 10 books, many of them based on his columns, and won the Los Angeles chapter of the Society of Professional Journalists' Distinguished Journalist award in 1981.

== Life and career ==
Smith was born in Long Beach on August 27, 1916, and grew up in both Bakersfield and Los Angeles. He attended Belmont High School in Los Angeles and served as editor of the student newspaper, the Belmont Sentinel. Smith would occasionally joke that it was the highest position he ever reached in his career. Following high school, Smith spent some time in the Civilian Conservation Corps before joining the United States Merchant Marine at age 21. He went into journalism, first for the Bakersfield Californian, then for the Honolulu Advertiser, United Press, the Sacramento Union, the San Diego Daily Journal, the Daily News, and the Los Angeles Herald-Express, before joining the Los Angeles Times in June 1953. He remained with the Times until his death in 1996.

=== World War II ===
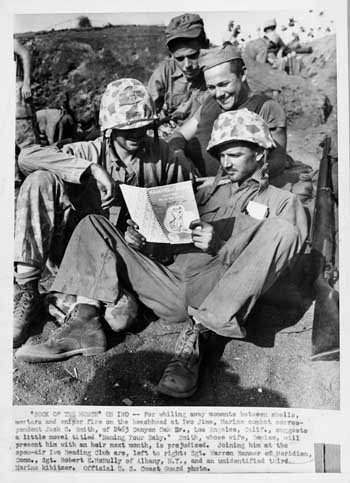
On the beach in Iwo Jima, Smith (bottom right) reads a book titled Naming Your Baby.

Smith was working for The Honolulu Advertiser during the Attack on Pearl Harbor in 1941. On the morning of the attack, he and his wife had just left an all-night party with some friends when they noticed airplanes streaking over the shoreline. Shortly after, they noticed black puffs exploding below the planes in the distance. Smith and his friend stood watching in the road beside the car, something he would later describe in a column as "watching the war start."

Smith enlisted in the United States Marine Corps as a combat correspondent and would take part in the Battle of Iwo Jima in 1945. In the amphibious landing on February 19, 1945, Smith went ashore in the third wave of soldiers with his rifle but without his typewriter, which had been lost at sea. Smith's Los Angeles Times column would occasionally recount his experiences during the battle. On the subject of the iconic Iwo Jima flag raising, Smith addressed a sometimes discussed controversy of a second, larger American flag being raised to replace the initially planted one (as the first one was too small to be seen by the soldiers fighting on the island). He recalled that he "happened to look up at Mt. Suribachi from the beach that day and saw [the flag] rippling in the breeze. I did not feel cheated because I had not seen the first one."

During his service on Iwo Jima, Smith was the subject of an Associated Press photograph that appeared on the front page of hundreds of newspapers across the United States. On D-Day plus 5, he had received a care package from his wife, who was pregnant with their first child. The package contained a book titled Naming Your Baby along with a letter encouraging him to help decide on a name while there was still time. As Smith flipped through the pages, a crowd of Marines formed around him, each of them urging him to look up their own names, and the names of their fathers, mothers, siblings, and girlfriends. "While we were engaged in this incongruous diversion," Smith wrote in his February 21, 1979 column, "a photographer happened by and was curious. What was going on here? He was sick of death, shock and horror and was looking for something upbeat. Human interest. A sign that life would go on." The photographer snapped several photos, one of which was distributed by the Associated Press and appeared in newspapers a few days later.

=== The Black Dahlia ===
It was as a rewrite man for the Daily News in 1947 that Smith had what he later called "perhaps my finest hour as a newspaperman": his stories on the infamous Elizabeth Short murder case. The police beat reporter phoned in the bulletin to Smith, who recounted the moment this way in his book Jack Smith's L.A.: "Within the minute I had written what may have been the first sentence ever written on the Black Dahlia case. I can't remember it word for word, but my lead went pretty much like this: 'The nude body of a young woman, neatly cut in two at the waist, was found early today on a vacant lot near Crenshaw and Exposition Boulevards.'" His editor added one adjective, making Short "a beautiful young woman ... Our city editor, of course, no more knew what the unfortunate young woman had looked like than I did ... But the lesson was clear. On the Daily News, at least, all young women whose nude bodies were found in two pieces on vacant lots were beautiful. I never forgot it."

Later in his career, Smith wrote that he always believed himself to be the first person to get the name "Black Dahlia" into print, though he admitted he didn't come up with the nickname. Smith picked up a tip that Elizabeth Short had frequented a Long Beach drugstore. Upon calling and speaking to the pharmacist, Smith was told that the kids around the soda fountain called her the Black Dahlia, on account of her black hair and in reference to a then current movie The Blue Dahlia. In his book Jack Smith's L.A. he described the discovery of the nickname as "a rewrite man's dream" and said he "couldn't wait to get it into type."

=== Jack Smith, columnist ===
Smith joined the Los Angeles Times in June 1953. At the Times, besides his duties as a rewrite man, in which he would quickly assemble stories based largely on information from reporters who phoned in from the field, Smith began writing humor pieces for the op-ed page. He was awarded his own column in 1958.

At the height of his popularity, Smith's columns were distributed to almost 600 newspapers worldwide by the Los Angeles Times-Washington Post News Service. His daily column was widely read at breakfast tables across Southern California, from the working class suburbs of Los Angeles to the mansions of Beverly Hills. Among his readers were Fred MacMurray, Bing Crosby, Henry Miller, Groucho Marx, and Charlton Heston. Groucho Marx was a self-described "avid reader" of Jack Smith. Charlton Heston, in a January 15, 1996 letter to the Los Angeles Times, wrote "Jack gave me the sense and rhythm of Los Angeles...Funny when he wanted to be, easy and generous always, Jack made me understand Los Angeles. I know of no one else who has done it as gracefully nor as well."

For most of his career he wrote five columns a week, a pace later eased to four per week. In 1992, he went into semi-retirement, writing one column per week. In his later years, his columns often concerned his declining health and the infirmities of age. Smith had quadruple bypass surgery in 1984 and a heart attack later that year, a second heart attack after prostate surgery in 1994 and a final heart attack in late December 1995. His last column appeared on December 25, 1995. He died on January 9, 1996, aged 79. His papers were donated to the Huntington Library in 2005. An exhibit, "Smith on Wry: Jack Smith, Columnist for Our Times" was on view at the Huntington in 2008. It featured original newspaper columns, drafts and galleys of his books, and other materials.

=== Personal life ===
Smith and his wife, Denny, lived in the same house in the Mount Washington, Los Angeles neighborhood near Downtown L.A. from 1950 until his death in 1996. Smith was such a proponent of the Mount Washington neighborhood, that a 3.2 mile out and back trail up the mountain bears his name (the Jack Smith Trail). In May 2004, Mount Washington Elementary School broke ground on the Jack and Denny Smith Library on their campus. The library, named in honor of Smith and his wife's dedication to Mount Washington, was dedicated on June 2, 2007.

Smith's family was often the subject of his columns, and readers came to know his wife Denny, their two sons, Curtis and Douglas, their two daughters-in-law, Gail and Jacqueline, and their five grandchildren, Chris, Adriana, Alison, Casey, and Trevor.

== Awards ==
Jack Smith won the Greater Los Angeles Press Club's highest honor, the Joseph M. Quinn Memorial Award, in 1991. According to his Los Angeles Times obituary: "He occasionally joked that he had come close to winning a Pulitzer Prize but that 'one can't talk about having won second place in the Pulitzer Prize.'"

== Quotes ==
In Westways Magazine, Smith wrote about driving down the Los Angeles River: "As we came out of the river I saw the Queen Mary. I thought that it was fitting to have a ship without engines sailing up a river without water."

On critics of Los Angeles: "Critics have despised us in Los Angeles as worshippers of money, health, sex, surf and sun. Not quite true. We don't worship those things; we just rather get used to them, since they happen to be so available."

"I've heard it said that men first begin to realize their youth is over when policemen begin to look like college boys. That's true, but there's a much more alarming sign, and that's when a man's doctors begin to die."

Describing a book publication party in 1973 for Norman Mailer's Marilyn: "[Mailer] stood in a slight crouch, feet apart, toes in, like a fighter; a good middleweight, over the hill, but game. His pale-blue eyes seemed alternately to burn and disconnect, as if his circuits were overloaded...They [Mailer and Monroe] had never met in life, and here was now, revealing himself as her last, most passionate, most hopeless lover...They seemed an odd couple: Mailer so open, Marilyn so closed. He should have called their book The Naked and the Dead."

Defending Los Angeles from Woody Allen's remark that making a right turn on a red light was Los Angeles' only contribution to culture: "What about the drive-in bank, the Frisbee, the doggie bag? What about our Hansel and Gretel cottages, our Assyrian rubber factory, our Beaux-Arts-Byzantine-Italian-Classic-Nebraska Modern City Hall? What about the drive-in church?"

On his Baja house: "When we reached the house, the rain had stopped, but the wind off the ocean was like wild organ music in the roof tiles. We lighted lanterns and I built a fire; that is to say, I put an ersatz log from the supermarket in the grate and put a match to it."

In the Times, Nov. 14, 1994, to " . . . the ultimate question—why are we here? . . . The answer is to keep on living and see what happens next."

== Bibliography ==
- Three Coins in the Birdbath. Doubleday. 1965. ASIN B001D4S4L4.
- Smith on Wry or, The Art of Coming Through. Doubleday. 1970. ASIN B0006C0FO8.
- God and Mr. Gomez. Los Angeles Times Books. 1974. ISBN 978-1883792688.
- The Big Orange. Ward Ritchie Press. 1976. ISBN 978-0378049566.
- Spend All Your Kisses, Mr. Smith. McGraw-Hill. 1978. ISBN 978-0070589872.
- Jack Smith's L.A. Pinnacle Books. 1980. ISBN 978-0523414935.
- How to Win a Pullet Surprise—The Pleasures and Pitfalls of Our Language. Franklin Watts. 1982. ISBN 978-0531098745.
- Cats, Dogs, and Other Strangers at My Door. Franklin Watts. 1984. ISBN 978-0531097519.
- Alive in La La Land. Franklin Watts. 1989. ISBN 9780531151143.
- Eternally Yours. Los Angeles Times Books. 1996. ISBN 978-0965306102.
