= George Burnham =

American politician (1868–1939)

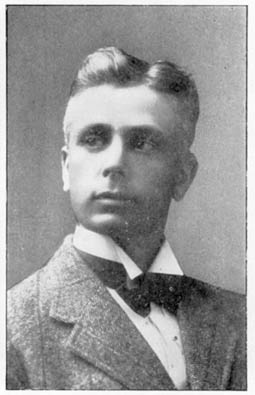

Member of the U.S. House of Representatives from California's 20th district
- In office March 4, 1933 – January 3, 1937
- Preceded by: District created
- Succeeded by: Edouard Izac

Personal details
- Born: December 28, 1868 London, England
- Died: June 28, 1939 (aged 70) San Diego, California
- Resting place: Greenwood Memorial Park, San Diego
- Party: Republican
- Profession: banker, politician

George Burnham (December 28, 1868 – June 28, 1939) was a banker and Republican politician from San Diego, California. He served two terms in the United States House of Representatives from 1933 to 1937.

== Biography ==
Burnham was born 1868 in London, England, to James and Maria Ann Burnham. He immigrated in 1881 to the United States with his parents, who settled in Spring Valley, Minnesota. He attended public schools in London and Minnesota. Burnham worked as a clerk from 1884 to 1886, then moved to Jackson, Minnesota, in 1887 where he entered the retail shoe business. In 1901, he moved to Spokane, Washington, and worked in real estate and ranching.

Burnham moved to San Diego in 1903 and continued to work in real estate with his brother John, until 1917 when he took up banking. Burnham was active in public affairs.

Burnham was one of the organizers of the Panama–California Exposition in 1909, serving as vice president from 1909 to 1916.

He was also member of the Honorary Commercial Commission to China in 1910, member of the San Diego Library Commission 1926–1932, a member of the San Diego Scientific Library 1926–1932, and vice president of the California-Pacific International Exposition 1935–1936.

Burnham married Neva May Ashley on October 1, 1890, and they had six children, Harold, Percy, Helen, Laurence, Virginia, and Ben. After she died, he married Florence Kennett Dupee.

=== Congress ===
Burnham was elected to the 73rd Congress in 1932, and reelected in 1934, serving as Representative for Imperial and San Diego counties. He worked to expand Navy presence in San Diego. In 1936, he drew up bills to add 365,000 acres (1460 km^{2}) of federal land in the Carrizo and Vallecito areas to the newly created Anza-Borrego Desert State Park.

=== Later career and death ===
In 1936, he did not run again and retired in San Diego, where he lived until his death in 1939. Burnham is interred in the Greenwood Cathedral Mausoleum, in Greenwood Memorial Park.

== Electoral history ==
1932 United States House of Representatives elections in California, 20th district
Party	Candidate	Votes	%
Republican	George Burnham	43,757	50.3
Democratic	Claude Chandler	43,304	49.7
Total votes		87,061	100.0
Republican hold			

1934 United States House of Representatives elections in California, 20th district
Party	Candidate	Votes	%
Republican	George Burnham (Incumbent)	51,682	52.4
Democratic	Edouard Izac	46,957	47.6
Total votes		98,639	100.0
Republican hold			

U.S. House of Representatives
New district	Member of the U.S. House of Representatives from California's 20th congressional district 1933–1937	Succeeded by Edouard Izac
