= California's 23rd congressional district =

U.S. House district for California

Coordinates: 34.5°N 120.45°W

- Interactive map of district boundaries
- Representative: Jay Obernolte; R–Big Bear Lake
- Population (2025): 767,346
- Median household income: $81,229
- Ethnicity: 41.6% Hispanic; 39.6% White; 8.5% Black; 4.3% Asian; 4.3% Two or more races; 1.5% other
- Cook PVI: R+8

California's 23rd congressional district is a congressional district in the U.S. state of California. The district is represented in the 119th United States Congress by Jay Obernolte.

Following the 2020 United States redistricting cycle, the district is anchored in San Bernardino County, and also includes parts of Kern and Los Angeles counties. It is mostly within the Mojave Desert. Cities in the new 23rd district include Victorville, Hesperia, Adelanto, Apple Valley, Barstow, Twentynine Palms, Big Bear Lake, California City, Loma Linda, Yucaipa, southern Redlands, and small portions of Highland and San Bernardino. It also has one of the highest active-duty military populations in the country, containing Fort Irwin National Training Center, Marine Corps Logistics Base Barstow, and Marine Corps Air Ground Combat Center Twentynine Palms.

== History ==
From 2003 to 2013 the district ran along the Pacific coasts of Ventura, Santa Barbara, and San Luis Obispo counties. Major cities in the district included Santa Barbara, San Luis Obispo, Ventura, and Oxnard. Before redistricting by the California Citizens Redistricting Commission in 2011, California's 23rd congressional district was one of the narrowest districts in the United States, stretching along the Pacific coast from Oxnard to the Monterey County line. It was often referred to as "the district that disappears at high tide" or the "ribbon of shame". This area is now divided between the 24th and 26th districts, while the current 23rd covers much of the territory that was previously in the 22nd district.

== Recent election results from statewide races ==
=== 2023–2027 boundaries ===
Year	Office	Results
2008	President	McCain 57%–42%
2010	Governor	Whitman 55%–36%
2010	Lt. Governor	Maldonado 49%–34%
2010	Secretary of State	Dunn 54%–35%
2010	Attorney General	Cooley 59%–29%
2010	Treasurer	Walters 50%–41%
2010	Controller	Strickland 51%–36%
2012	President	Romney 58%–42%
2014	Governor	Kashkari 62%–38%
2016	President	Trump 55%–40%
2018	Governor	Cox 60%–40%
2018	Attorney General	Bailey 58%–42%
2020	President	Trump 54%–44%
2022	Senate (Reg.)	Meuser 59%–41%
2022	Governor	Dahle 61%–39%
2022	Lt. Governor	Underwood Jacobs 60%–40%
2022	Secretary of State	Bernosky 60%–40%
2022	Attorney General	Hochman 60%–40%
2022	Treasurer	Guerrero 61%–39%
2022	Controller	Chen 61%–39%
2024	President	Trump 57%–40%
2024	Senate (Reg.)	Garvey 59%–41%

== Composition ==
FIPS County Code	County	Seat	Population
29	Kern	Bakersfield	913,820
37	Los Angeles	Los Angeles	9,663,345
71	San Bernardino	San Bernardino	2,195,611

Under the 2020 redistricting, California's 23rd congressional district is located in the region of the state covering the Mojave Desert. It encompasses the majority of San Bernardino, and parts of Kern and Los Angeles Counties. The area in San Bernardino County includes parts of the cities of Redlands, Highland, and San Bernardino; the cities of Victorville, Barstow, Twentynine Palms, Adelanto, Yucaipa, Loma Linda, Apple Valley, Hesperia, Colton, and Big Bear Lake; the town of Yucca Valley; and the census-designated places Searles Valley, Fort Irwin, Baker, Yermo, Silver Lakes, Piñon Hills, Phelan, Oak Hills, Mountain View Acres, Spring Valley Lake, Mentone, Oak Glen, Crestline, Lake Arrowhead, Running Springs, Lucerne Valley, Big Bear City, Morongo Valley, Joshua Tree, Homestead Valley. The area in Kern County includes part of the census-designated place of Mojave; the city of California City; and the census-designated places North Edwards, Boron, Randsburg, and Johannesburg. The area in Los Angeles County includes the census-designated place Lake Los Angeles.

San Bernardino County is split between this district, the 25th district, the 28th district, the 33rd district, and the 40th district. The 23rd, 28th and 33rd are partitioned by San Bernardino National Forest, Manzanita Rd, Highway 15, Cajon Blvd, W Kenwood Ave, Highway 215, W Meyers Rd, Ohio Ave, Pine Ave, Bailey act, Highway 206, Devils Canyon Rd, Cloudland Truck Trail, Cloudland Cutoff, Hill Dr, W 54th St, E Hill Dr, Bonita Vista Dr, Sterling Ave, Argyle Ave, E Marshall Blvd, Rockford Ave, Lynwood Dr, La Praix St, Orchid Dr, Denair Ave, Highland Ave, Orchard Rd, Arroyo Vista Dr, Church St, Greensport Rd, Florida St, Garnet St, Nice Ave, Crafton Ave, 5th Ave, Walnut St, 6th Ave, S Wabash Ave, E Citrus Ave, N Church St, Southern California Regional Rail A, Tennessee St, Highway 10, California St, E Washington St, and S Barton Rd. The 23rd and 25th are partitioned by Power Line Rd, Telephone Pole Line Rd, Cadiz Rd, Arizona & California Rail, San Bernardino National Forest, East Mojave Heritage Trail, Sunflower Springs Spur, Sunflower Springs Rd, Needles Freeway, Mountain Springs Rd, Goffs Rd, and Walter Rd.

Kern County is split between this district and the 20th district. They are partitioned by the Mojave-Barstow Highway, Treescape Rd, Oak Creek Rd, Anajanette Ave, 70th St W, Highway 58, Homer Hansen Private Rd, Aerospace Highway, Redrock Randsburgs Rd, Garlock Rd, Iron Canyon, and Union Pacific.

Los Angeles County is split between this district, the 27th district, and the 28th district. They are partitioned by Angeles National Forest, Linda Mesa Rd, San Gabriel Mountains, Fort Tejon Rd, 121st St E, 123rd St E, 126th St E, Highway N6, Highway 138, 136th St E, Longview Rd, E Avenue S, 140th St E, E Avenue H, 120th St E.

=== Cities and CDPs with 10,000 or more people ===
- San Bernardino – 222,101
- Victorville – 134,810
- Hesperia – 99,818
- Apple Valley – 75,791
- Redlands – 73,168
- Highland – 56,999
- Yucaipa – 54,542
- Colton – 53,909
- Adelanto – 38,046
- Twentynine Palms – 28,065
- Barstow – 25,415
- Loma Linda – 24,791
- Yucca Valley – 21,738
- California City – 14,973
- Phelan – 13,859
- Lake Los Angeles – 13,187
- Big Bear City – 12,738
- Lake Arrowhead – 12,401
- Crestline – 11,650

=== 2,500 – 10,000 people ===
- Spring Valley Lake – 9,598
- Mentone – 9,557
- Oak Hills – 9,450
- Fort Irwin – 8,845
- Piñon Hills – 7,258
- Joshua Tree – 6,589
- Silver Lakes – 6,317
- Lucerne Valley – 5,331
- Running Springs – 5,268
- Big Bear Lake – 5,046
- Mojave – 4,699
- Lenwood – 3,623
- Morongo Valley – 3,514
- Mountain View Acres – 3,337
- Homestead Valley – 2,789

== Future composition ==
Beginning with the 2026 election, the 23rd district will consist of the following counties:

- Kern (part)
- Los Angeles (part)
- Riverside (part)
- San Bernardino (part)

== List of members representing the district ==
Representative	Party	Years	Cong ress(es)	Electoral history	District location
District created January 3, 1943
Edouard Izac (San Diego)	Democratic	January 3, 1943 – January 3, 1947	78th 79th	Redistricted from the 20th district and re-elected in 1942. Re-elected in 1944. Lost re-election.	1943–1953; San Diego
Charles K. Fletcher (San Diego)	Republican	January 3, 1947 – January 3, 1949	80th	Elected in 1946. Lost re-election.	1943–1953; San Diego
Clinton D. McKinnon (San Diego)	Democratic	January 3, 1949 – January 3, 1953	81st 82nd	Elected in 1948. Re-elected in 1950. Retired to run for U.S. senator.	1943–1953; San Diego
Clyde Doyle (South Gate)	Democratic	January 3, 1953 – March 14, 1963	83rd 84th 85th 86th 87th 88th	Redistricted from the 18th district and re-elected in 1952. Re-elected in 1954. Re-elected in 1956. Re-elected in 1958. Re-elected in 1960. Re-elected in 1962. Died.	1953–1973; Los Angeles
Vacant		March 14, 1963 – June 11, 1963	88th		1953–1973; Los Angeles
Del M. Clawson (Downey)	Republican	June 11, 1963 – January 3, 1975	88th 89th 90th 91st 92nd 93rd	Elected to finish Doyle's term. Re-elected in 1964. Re-elected in 1966. Re-elected in 1968. Re-elected in 1970. Re-elected in 1972. Redistricted to the 33rd district.	1953–1973; Los Angeles
Del M. Clawson (Downey)	Republican	June 11, 1963 – January 3, 1975	88th 89th 90th 91st 92nd 93rd	Elected to finish Doyle's term. Re-elected in 1964. Re-elected in 1966. Re-elected in 1968. Re-elected in 1970. Re-elected in 1972. Redistricted to the 33rd district.	1973–1975; Los Angeles, Orange
Thomas M. Rees (Los Angeles)	Democratic	January 3, 1975 – January 3, 1977	94th	Redistricted from the 26th district and re-elected in 1974. Retired.	1975–1983; Los Angeles
Anthony Beilenson (Los Angeles)	Democratic	January 3, 1977 – January 3, 1993	95th 96th 97th 98th 99th 100th 101st 102nd	Elected in 1976. Re-elected in 1978. Re-elected in 1980. Re-elected in 1982. Re-elected in 1984. Re-elected in 1986. Re-elected in 1988. Re-elected in 1990. Redistricted to the 24th district.	1975–1983; Los Angeles
Anthony Beilenson (Los Angeles)	Democratic	January 3, 1977 – January 3, 1993	95th 96th 97th 98th 99th 100th 101st 102nd	Elected in 1976. Re-elected in 1978. Re-elected in 1980. Re-elected in 1982. Re-elected in 1984. Re-elected in 1986. Re-elected in 1988. Re-elected in 1990. Redistricted to the 24th district.	1983–1993; Los Angeles (northern L.A. suburbs)
Elton Gallegly (Simi Valley)	Republican	January 3, 1993 – January 3, 2003	103rd 104th 105th 106th 107th	Redistricted from the 21st district and re-elected in 1992. Re-elected in 1994. Re-elected in 1996. Re-elected in 1998. Re-elected in 2000. Redistricted to the 24th district.	1993–2003; Santa Barbara (Carpinteria), Ventura
Lois Capps (Santa Barbara)	Democratic	January 3, 2003 – January 3, 2013	108th 109th 110th 111th 112th	Redistricted from the 22nd district and re-elected in 2002. Re-elected in 2004. Re-elected in 2006. Re-elected in 2008. Re-elected in 2010. Redistricted to the 24th district.	2003–2013; Coastal San Luis Obispo, Santa Barbara, Ventura
Kevin McCarthy (Bakersfield)	Republican	January 3, 2013 – January 3, 2023	113th 114th 115th 116th 117th	Redistricted from the 22nd district and re-elected in 2012. Re-elected in 2014. Re-elected in 2016. Re-elected in 2018. Re-elected in 2020. Redistricted to the 20th district.	2013–2023 Southern Central Valley including parts of Bakersfield
Jay Obernolte (Big Bear Lake)	Republican	January 3, 2023 – present	118th 119th	Redistricted from the 8th district and re-elected in 2022. Re-elected in 2024.	2023–present Most of the area of San Bernardino County and parts of Kern and Los Angeles counties

== Election results ==
=== 1942 ===
1942 election
Party	Candidate	Votes	%
Democratic	Edouard Izac (Incumbent)	42,864	50.5%
Republican	James B. Abbey	42,087	49.5%
Total votes		84,951	100.0%
Turnout			
Democratic hold			

=== 1944 ===
1944 election
Party	Candidate	Votes	%
Democratic	Edouard Izac (Incumbent)	86,707	55.1%
Republican	James B. Abbey	70,787	44.9%
Total votes		157,494	100.0%
Turnout			
Democratic hold			

=== 1946 ===
1946 election
Party	Candidate	Votes	%
Republican	Charles K. Fletcher	69,411	56.3%
Democratic	Edouard Izac (Incumbent)	53,898	43.7%
Total votes		123,309	100.0%
Turnout			
Republican gain from Democratic			

=== 1948 ===
1948 election
Party	Candidate	Votes	%
Democratic	Clinton D. McKinnon	112,534	55.8%
Republican	Charles K. Fletcher (Incumbent)	87,138	43.2%
Progressive	Harry C. Steinmetz	2,017	1.0%
Total votes		201,689	100.0%
Turnout			
Democratic gain from Republican			

=== 1950 ===
1950 election
Party	Candidate	Votes	%
Democratic	Clinton D. McKinnon (Incumbent)	94,137	51%
Republican	Leslie E. Gehres	90,398	49%
Total votes		184,535	100.0%
Turnout			
Democratic hold			

=== 1952 ===
1952 election
Party	Candidate	Votes	%
Democratic	Clyde Doyle (Incumbent)	138,356	87.5%
Progressive	Olive T. Thompson	17,501	11.1%
Republican	C. Cleveland (write-in)	2,329	1.4%
Total votes		158,186	100.0%
Turnout			
Democratic hold			

=== 1954 ===
1954 election
Party	Candidate	Votes	%
Democratic	Clyde Doyle (Incumbent)	90,729	70.9%
Republican	Frank G. Bussing	34,911	27.3%
Progressive	Olive T. Thompson	2,293	1.8%
Total votes		127,933	100.0%
Turnout			
Democratic hold			

=== 1956 ===
1956 election
Party	Candidate	Votes	%
Democratic	Clyde Doyle (Incumbent)	120,109	70.9%
Republican	E. Elgie "Cal" Calvin	49,198	29.1%
Total votes		169,207	100.0%
Turnout			
Democratic hold			

=== 1958 ===
1958 election
Party	Candidate	Votes	%
Democratic	Clyde Doyle (Incumbent)	140,817	100.0%
Turnout			
Democratic hold			

=== 1960 ===
1960 election
Party	Candidate	Votes	%
Democratic	Clyde Doyle (Incumbent)	148,415	74.2%
Republican	Emmett A. Schwartz	51,548	25.8%
Total votes		199,963	100.0%
Turnout			
Democratic hold			

=== 1962 ===
1962 election
Party	Candidate	Votes	%
Democratic	Clyde Doyle (Incumbent)	83,269	64.2%
Republican	Emmett A. Schwartz	46,488	35.8%
Total votes		129,757	100.0%
Turnout			
Democratic hold			

=== 1963 (Special) ===
1963 special election
Party	Candidate	Votes	%
Republican	Del M. Clawson		53.2%
Democratic	Carley V. Porter		35.4%
Democratic	Maurice H. Quigley		4.7%
Democratic	Armand R. Porter		2.7%
Democratic	James Earle Christo		1.4%
Democratic	Lynn W. Johnston		1.4%
Republican	Harold R. "Hal" Bennett		0.6%
Republican	Harry L. Butler		0.6%
Total votes			100.0%
Turnout			
Republican gain from Democratic			

=== 1964 ===
1964 election
Party	Candidate	Votes	%
Republican	Del M. Clawson (Incumbent)	90,721	55.4%
Democratic	H. O. Van Pettin	72,903	44.6%
Total votes		163,624	100.0%
Turnout			
Republican hold			

=== 1966 ===
1966 election
Party	Candidate	Votes	%
Republican	Del M. Clawson (Incumbent)	93,320	67.4%
Democratic	Ed O'Connor	45,141	32.6%
Total votes		138,461	100.0%
Turnout			
Republican hold			

=== 1968 ===
1968 election
Party	Candidate	Votes	%
Republican	Del M. Clawson (Incumbent)	95,628	64.9%
Democratic	Jim Sperrazzo	51,606	35.1%
Total votes		147,234	100.0%
Turnout			
Republican hold			

=== 1970 ===
1970 election
Party	Candidate	Votes	%
Republican	Del M. Clawson (Incumbent)	77,346	63.3%
Democratic	G. L. "Jerry" Chapman	44,767	36.7%
Total votes		122,113	100.0%
Turnout			
Republican hold			

=== 1972 ===
1972 election
Party	Candidate	Votes	%
Republican	Del M. Clawson (Incumbent)	118,731	61.4%
Democratic	Conrad G. Tuohey	74,561	38.6%
Total votes		193,292	100.0%
Turnout			
Republican hold			

=== 1974 ===
1974 election
Party	Candidate	Votes	%
Democratic	Thomas M. Rees	119,239	71.4%
Republican	Jack E. Roberts	47,615	28.6%
Total votes		166,854	100.0%
Turnout			
Democratic hold			

=== 1976 ===
1976 election
Party	Candidate	Votes	%
Democratic	Anthony C. Beilenson	130,619	60.2%
Republican	Thomas F. Bartman	86,434	39.8%
Total votes		217,053	100.0%
Turnout			
Democratic hold			

=== 1978 ===
1978 election
Party	Candidate	Votes	%
Democratic	Anthony C. Beilenson (Incumbent)	117,498	65.6%
Republican	Joseph Barbara	61,496	34.4%
Total votes		178,994	100.0%
Turnout			
Democratic hold			

=== 1980 ===
1980 election
Party	Candidate	Votes	%
Democratic	Anthony C. Beilenson (Incumbent)	126,020	63.2%
Republican	Robert "Bob" Winckler	62,742	31.5%
Libertarian	Jeffrey P. Lieb	10,623	5.3%
Total votes		199,385	100.0%
Turnout			
Democratic hold			

=== 1982 ===
1982 election
Party	Candidate	Votes	%
Democratic	Anthony C. Beilenson (Incumbent)	120,788	59.6%
Republican	David Armor	82,031	40.4%
Total votes		202,819	100.0%
Turnout			
Democratic hold			

=== 1984 ===
1984 election
Party	Candidate	Votes	%
Democratic	Anthony C. Beilenson (Incumbent)	140,461	61.6%
Republican	Claude W. Parrish	84,093	36.9%
Libertarian	Larry Leathers	3,580	1.6%
Total votes		228,134	100.0%
Turnout			
Democratic hold			

=== 1986 ===
1986 election
Party	Candidate	Votes	%
Democratic	Anthony C. Beilenson (Incumbent)	121,468	65.7%
Republican	George Woolverton	58,746	31.8%
Peace and Freedom	Tom Hopke	2,521	1.4%
Libertarian	Taylor Rhodes	2,019	1.1%
Total votes		184,754	100.0%
Turnout			
Democratic hold			

=== 1988 ===
1988 election
Party	Candidate	Votes	%
Democratic	Anthony C. Beilenson (Incumbent)	147,858	63.5%
Republican	Jim Salomon	77,184	33.1%
Libertarian	John R. Vernon	4,503	1.9%
Peace and Freedom	John Honigsfeld	3,316	1.4%
No party	Write-ins	18	0.0%
Total votes		232,879	100.0%
Turnout			
Democratic hold			

=== 1990 ===
1990 election
Party	Candidate	Votes	%
Democratic	Anthony C. Beilenson (Incumbent)	103,141	61.7%
Republican	Jim Salomon	57,118	34.2%
Peace and Freedom	John Honigsfeld	6,834	4.1%
Total votes		167,093	100.0%
Turnout			
Democratic hold			

=== 1992 ===
1992 election
Party	Candidate	Votes	%
Republican	Elton Gallegly (Redistricted incumbent)	115,504	54.3%
Democratic	Anita Perez Ferguson	88,225	41.4%
Libertarian	Jay C. Wood	9,091	4.3%
No party	Dunbar (write-in)	61	0.0%
Total votes		212,881	100.0%
Turnout			
Republican hold			

=== 1994 ===
1994 election
Party	Candidate	Votes	%
Republican	Elton Gallegly (Incumbent)	114,043	66.17%
Democratic	Kevin Ready	47,345	27.47%
Libertarian	Bill Brown	6,481	3.76%
Green	Robert T. Marston	4,457	2.59%
No party	Nagode (write-in)	14	0.01%
Total votes		172,340	100.0%
Turnout			
Republican hold			

=== 1996 ===
1996 election
Party	Candidate	Votes	%
Republican	Elton Gallegly (Incumbent)	118,880	59.6%
Democratic	Robert Unruhe	70,035	35.2%
Libertarian	Gail Lightfoot	8,346	4.1%
Natural Law	Stephen Hospodar	2,246	1.1%
Total votes		199,507	100.0%
Turnout			
Republican hold			

=== 1998 ===
1998 election
Party	Candidate	Votes	%
Republican	Elton Gallegly (Incumbent)	96,362	60.06%
Democratic	Daniel "Dan" Gonzalez	64,068	39.94%
Total votes		160,430	100.0%
Turnout			
Republican hold			

=== 2000 ===
2000 election
Party	Candidate	Votes	%
Republican	Elton Gallegly (Incumbent)	119,479	54.1%
Democratic	Michael Case	89,918	40.7%
Reform	Cary Savitch	6,473	3.0%
Libertarian	Roger Peebles	3,708	1.6%
Natural Law	Stephen P. Hospodar	1,456	0.6%
Total votes		221,034	100.0%
Turnout			
Republican hold			

=== 2002 ===
2002 election
Party	Candidate	Votes	%
Democratic	Lois Capps (Redistricted incumbent)	95,752	59.1%
Republican	Beth Rogers	62,604	38.6%
Libertarian	James E. Hill	3,866	2.3%
Total votes		162,222	100.0%
Turnout			
Democratic hold			

=== 2004 ===
2004 election
Party	Candidate	Votes	%
Democratic	Lois Capps (Incumbent)	153,980	63.1%
Republican	Don Regan	83,926	34.3%
Libertarian	Michael Favorite	6,391	2.6%
Total votes		244,297	100.0%
Turnout			
Democratic hold			

=== 2006 ===
2006 election
Party	Candidate	Votes	%
Democratic	Lois Capps (Incumbent)	114,661	65.2%
Republican	Victor G. Tognazzini	61,272	34.8%
No party	H.A. Gardner Jr. (write-in)	18	0.0%
Total votes		175,951	100.0%
Turnout			
Democratic hold			

=== 2008 ===
2008 election
Party	Candidate	Votes	%
Democratic	Lois Capps (Incumbent)	171,403	68.07%
Republican	Matt Kokkonen	80,385	31.93%
Total votes		251,788	100.00%
Turnout			77.41%
Democratic hold			

=== 2010 ===
2010 election
Party	Candidate	Votes	%
Democratic	Lois Capps (Incumbent)	111,768	57.8%
Republican	Tom Watson	72,744	37.6%
Libertarian	Darrell M. Stafford	3,326	1.7%
No party	John V. Hager	5,625	2.9%
Total votes		193,463	100.0%
Turnout			
Democratic hold			

=== 2012 ===
2012 election
Party	Candidate	Votes	%
Republican	Kevin McCarthy (Redistricted incumbent)	158,161	73.2%
No party preference	Terry Phillips	57,842	26.8%
Total votes		216,003	100.0%
Republican hold			

=== 2014 ===
2014 election
Primary election
Party	Candidate	Votes	%
Republican	Kevin McCarthy (Incumbent)	58,334	99.1%
Democratic	Raul Garcia (write-in)	313	0.5%
Republican	Mike Biglay (write-in)	157	0.3%
No party preference	Ronald L. Porter (write-in)	36	0.1%
Libertarian	Gail K. Lightfoot (write-in)	31	0.1%
Green	Noah Calugaru (write-in)	3	0.01%
Total votes		58,871	100.0%
General election
Republican	Kevin McCarthy (Incumbent)	100,317	74.8%
Democratic	Raul Garcia	33,726	25.2%
Total votes		134,043	100.0%
Republican hold			

=== 2016 ===
2016 election
Party	Candidate	Votes	%
Republican	Kevin McCarthy (Incumbent)	167,116	69.2%
Democratic	Wendy Reed	74,468	30.8%
Total votes		241,584	100.0%
Republican hold			

=== 2018 ===
2018 election
Party	Candidate	Votes	%
Republican	Kevin McCarthy (Incumbent)	131,113	63.7%
Democratic	Tatiana Matta	74,661	36.3%
Total votes		205,774	100.0%
Republican hold			

=== 2020 ===
2020 election
Primary election
Party	Candidate	Votes	%
Republican	Kevin McCarthy (incumbent)	107,897	66.5
Democratic	Kim Mangone	54,375	33.5
Total votes		162,272	100.0
General election
Republican	Kevin McCarthy (incumbent)	190,222	62.1
Democratic	Kim Mangone	115,896	37.9
Total votes		306,118	100.0
Republican hold			

Kevin McCarthy was redistricted to California's 20th congressional district prior to the 2022 election.

=== 2022 ===
2022 election
Primary election
Party	Candidate	Votes	%
Republican	Jay Obernolte (incumbent)	57,988	60.9
Democratic	Derek Marshall	20,776	21.8
Democratic	Bianca A. Gómez	16,516	17.3
Total votes		95,280	100.0
General election
Republican	Jay Obernolte (incumbent)	103,197	61.0
Democratic	Derek Marshall	65,908	39.0
Total votes		169,105	100.0
Republican hold			

=== 2024 ===
2024 election
Primary election
Party	Candidate	Votes	%
Republican	Jay Obernolte (incumbent)	70,208	63.4
Democratic	Derek Marshall	40,477	36.6
Total votes		110,685	100.0
General election
Republican	Jay Obernolte (incumbent)	159,286	60.1
Democratic	Derek Marshall	105,563	39.9
Total votes		264,849	100.0
Republican hold			

== Historical district boundaries ==
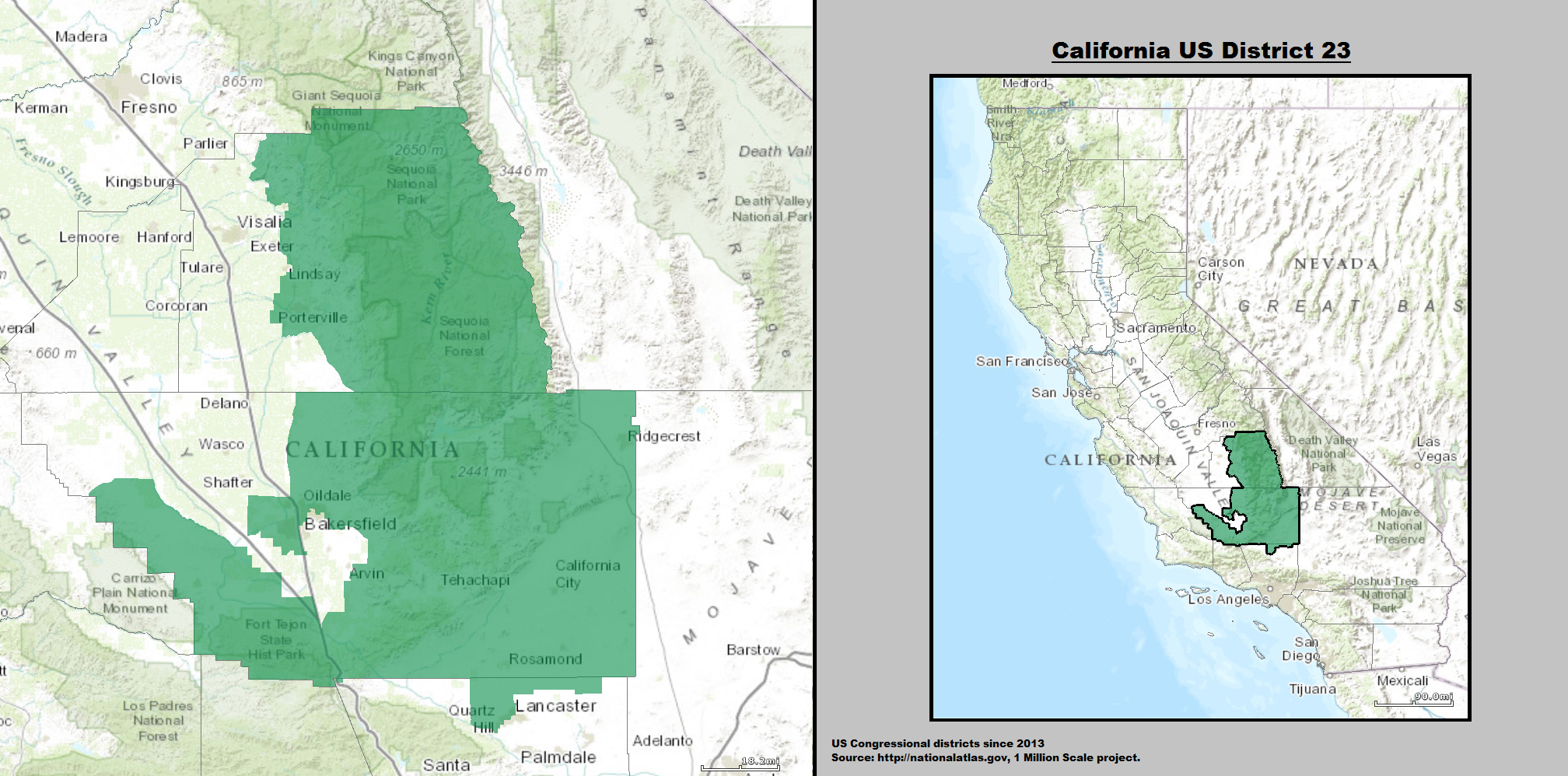
2013 – 2023

== See also ==
- List of United States congressional districts
- California's congressional districts
