= WMTV =

Television station in Madison, Wisconsin

- Madison, Wisconsin; United States
- Channels: Digital: 19 (UHF); Virtual: 15
- Branding: WMTV 15; 15 News; Madison CW (15.2)

Programming
- Affiliations: 15.1: NBC; 15.2: The CW; for others, see § Subchannels

Ownership
- Owner: Gray Media; (Gray Television Licensee, LLC)

History
- First air date: July 19, 1953
- Former channel number: Analog: 33 (UHF, 1953–1961), 15 (UHF, 1961–2009)
- Former affiliations: Both secondary: DuMont (1953–1955); ABC (1953–1956)
- Call sign meaning: "Watch Madison Television"

Technical information
- Licensing authority: FCC
- Facility ID: 6870
- ERP: 155 kW
- HAAT: 414.8 m (1,361 ft)
- Transmitter coordinates: 43°3′3″N 89°29′13″W

Links
- Public license information: Public file; LMS
- Website: www.wmtv15news.com

WMTV (channel 15) is a television station in Madison, Wisconsin, United States, affiliated with NBC and The CW. The station is owned by Gray Media and maintains studios and transmitter facilities on Forward Drive in the Greentree neighborhood on Madison's southwest side.

WMTV was the second television station to air in Madison, beginning in July 1953 just days after WKOW, and has been its NBC affiliate since signing on the air. Founded by a company controlled by the Bartell Group, it was sold to the Wisconsin Valley Television Company (later Forward Communications Corporation) in 1963. WMTV was successful and competitive in local news ratings under Forward in spite of the economic disadvantages inherent in being an ultra high frequency (UHF) station. However, after Forward was sold to a private equity firm in the 1980s, the station experienced a ratings slump. After a succession of owners in the late 1980s and 1990s, Gray acquired WMTV in 2002. The CW affiliation moved to this station in 2016 from previous affiliate WBUW.

== History ==
=== Early years on channel 33 ===
After the Federal Communications Commission (FCC) lifted its four-year freeze on new television station grants and opened the ultra high frequency (UHF) band for television use, applications were received to start new stations in Madison. The first came from the Bartell Group, owned by Madison radio announcer Gerry Bartell and owner of Milwaukee station WOKY, for channel 33, one of two UHF channels allocated for commercial use in the city. Another application for channel 33 was made by Earl W. Fessler, owner of Madison FM radio outlet WMFM. In late December, Fessler and Bartell combined their applications as the Bartell Television Corporation. With no other bids left to consider, Bartell Television was granted a construction permit on January 23, 1953.

WMTV signed on the air with a test pattern on July 8, 1953, and began normal operation 11 days later with a dedication program. This made it the second station on air in Madison, as WKOW-TV (channel 27) began broadcasting on July 8. It was an affiliate of NBC, ABC, and DuMont. The WMTV facility along the Beltline contained a main studio complete with a revolving stage, which the station claimed to be the only one in a TV studio east of California, as well as a permanently installed kitchen for cooking shows. One such cooking program was hosted by Carson Gulley, the supervising chef for the residence halls at the University of Wisconsin–Madison, who hosted a program with his wife Beatrice from 1953 to 1962. ABC programs moved to WKOW-TV in September 1956 when WISC-TV began as a CBS affiliate on channel 3.

In March 1956, it was announced that the Badger Broadcasting Company, owner of radio station WIBA and a joint venture of The Capital Times and Wisconsin State Journal newspapers, could soon own WMTV, with Gerry Bartell staying as the station's general manager. Bartell proposed to sell the newspapers a two-thirds interest in the station. However, the parties were unable to reach final agreement on matters related to the sale, and the proposed transaction was abandoned in August. With WMTV as Bartell's only television property, Wometco Enterprises filed in 1957 to buy WMTV for $350,000.

=== Move to channel 15; Forward ownership ===
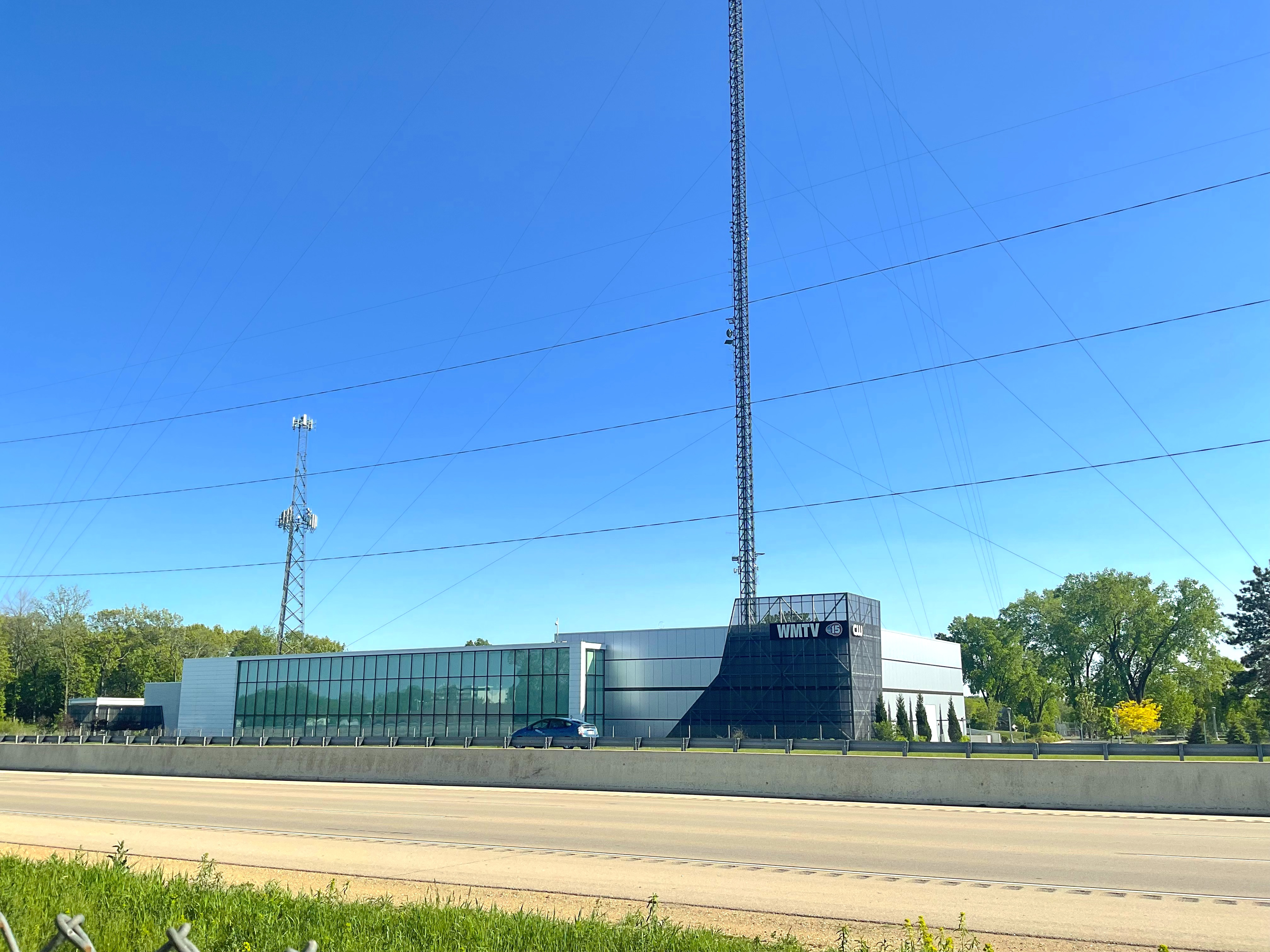
WMTV's transmitter, studio, and broadcast center along the Madison Beltline.

Wometco owned the station less than a year before Forward Television, a subsidiary of Lee Enterprises of Mason City, Iowa, acquired WMTV in 1958; the Forward name came from the Wisconsin state motto. During Forward Television's ownership, in April 1961, the FCC inserted channel 15 at Madison; WMTV applied to move from channel 33 to channel 15, which would increase its reception range. After postponements caused by weather and delays in fabricating the antenna needed to broadcast the channel 15 signal, the move took effect on October 25, 1961.

Lee accepted an offer from Wisconsin Valley Television Corporation to acquire WMTV in December 1962. Wisconsin Valley was a consortium of newspaper interests that owned WSAU radio and television in Wausau. The FCC only narrowly approved the transaction on a 4–3 vote in May 1963. The sale's opposition was largely due to an investigation underway as to whether Wisconsin Valley was associating with an educational TV group in Wausau so as to prevent a second commercial station from being built there. As a result, a condition was attached to sale approval that allowed the FCC to force a divestiture of the station were the commission to rule against Wisconsin Valley in the Wausau proceeding. That September, the FCC voted 5–0 to allow the sale to stand after Midcontinent Broadcasting, owner of WKOW-TV, asked it to reconsider its earlier ruling.

Wisconsin Valley gave channel 15 a significant technical overhaul, including an upgraded transmitter facility which increased the effective radiated power to 950,000 watts in 1965. (Note: Promoted as one million watts, but it was not.) Wisconsin Valley renamed itself Forward Communications Corporation at the start of 1967 in the wake of acquiring its first broadcast property outside the state of Wisconsin, KVTV in Sioux City, Iowa. (Note: The Forward Television name was retained under Wisconsin Valley when WMTV was acquired. In 1963, Bartell Road, on which WMTV's studios were located, was renamed Forward Drive.) Despite an improved product and Forward's ability to pull WMTV out of its status as a "financial loser", the Madison station continued to face an inherent disadvantage because of its UHF signal against WISC-TV, the only local very high frequency (VHF) station.

Forward was sold in late 1984 to Wesray Capital Corporation, which retained the Forward name for its media holdings. However, Wesray, as with many private equity firms of the era, cut what it felt were unnecessary expenses. Prior to the sale, WMTV competed with WISC for the lead in local news ratings, finding stronger viewership inside the Madison Beltline in Dane County itself. However, the station was hit by cutbacks in the newsroom and in the production of non-news local programming, as well as declining news ratings. The departures of sports director Jack Eich, who was fired, and Paula Dilworth, who was passed over for a promotion and departed the station for a job in Las Vegas, made headlines and put general manager Leslie Leonard in the spotlight.

=== Since 1988 ===
Wesray sold its TV stations to Adams Communications in 1988, but the deal left Adams highly leveraged and ill-prepared to confront declines in the value of broadcast properties, prompting it to default on $283 million of debt in 1991; that same year, WMTV debuted its first morning newscast, Wisconsin Today. Brissette Broadcasting was formed the next year when Paul Brissette, who had been the vice president of Adams Communications's television stations division, bought out the business for $257 million. Four years later, in a $270 million merger, Brissette was folded into Benedek Broadcasting after the company was unable to expand by adding stations. By that time, WMTV had slumped to third in local news ratings; later in 1996, it rebranded as NBC 15. When longtime weatherman Elmer Childress retired in 1997, the station opted to replace his "folksy, low-tech" weathercasts with a more modern approach, buying new equipment and adding its own Doppler weather radar.

Financial problems developed at Benedek at the start of the new millennium. The early 2000s recession reduced ad sales and caused the company to be unable to pay interest on a set of bonds issued in 1996, prompting a filing for Chapter 11 bankruptcy. Most of the Benedek stations, including WMTV, were sold to Gray Television in 2002. The station discontinued analog broadcasting on February 17, 2009. In 2011, the station was second-rated in early and late evening news, in a virtual tie with WKOW, but won mornings and had revenue comparable to WISC.

In 2016, Gray built new studios for WMTV adjacent to the original facility. The new building features twice the square footage as the old studios, which were demolished for parking. That same year, a new affiliation agreement between The CW and Gray resulted in the network affiliation in Madison moving to a subchannel of WMTV from WBUW. In late 2023, the station rebranded from NBC 15 to WMTV 15.

== Subchannels ==
WMTV's transmitter facility is co-sited with its studios on Forward Drive in the Greentree neighborhood on Madison's southwest side. The station's signal is multiplexed:

Subchannels of WMTV
Subchannel	Res.	Short name	Programming
15.1	1080i	WMTVNBC	NBC
15.2	720p	WMTV-CW	The CW
15.3	480i	OUTLAW	Outlaw
15.4	480i	MeTV	MeTV
15.5	480i	STARTTV	Start TV
15.6	480i	THE365	365BLK
