= San Diego Daily Journal =

California newspaper (1944–1950)

The San Diego Daily Journal was a daily newspaper in San Diego, California, published under that name from 1944 to 1950. It was established by Clinton D. McKinnon, publisher of the twice-weekly San Diego Progress-Journal, who announced in January 1944 that it would become a daily to compete with the established San Diego Union and Tribune.

The Daily Journal's debut was supported by allocations of newsprint—then under wartime rationing controls—by the Democratic FDR administration, looking to support competition in a market dominated by the Republican Union. The Union-Tribune company "moved vigorously against its new competitor"; Lionel Van Deerlin, Daily Journal city editor and later a US congressman, recalled that McKinnon "would offer six silver knives for a six-month subscription to the Journal, and the Tribune would counter by offering a weekend in Catalina."

Besides Van Deerlin, notable Journal alumni include Neil Morgan, who started his career there as a columnist, later becoming editor of the Evening Tribune; Jack Smith, future columnist for the Los Angeles Times and author; and, Paul White, founder of CBS's news division.

McKinnon, who was preparing for a run for US Congress, sold a majority stake of the paper to journalist John A. Kennedy in 1947. Kennedy sold it to the Union-Tribune Publishing Company in 1950.

Its predecessor titles were:

- San Diego Progress-Journal (1933 to 1944)
- San Diego Progress (1925 to 1933)
- Greater San Diego Progress (1924 to 1925)

== KSDJ ==
In 1946, McKinnon started KSDJ, a 5,000 watt CBS affiliate radio station, advertised with the tagline "The Voice of The Daily Journal". Its call sign was derived from the Journal name. Originally owned personally by McKinnon, the station was bought by the Journal in 1947 as part of the deal which made Kennedy the Journal's majority owner. The radio station was sold to Charles E. Salik on October 21, 1948, and in January 1949 its call sign was changed to KCBQ.
