= KCBQ =

Talk radio station in San Diego

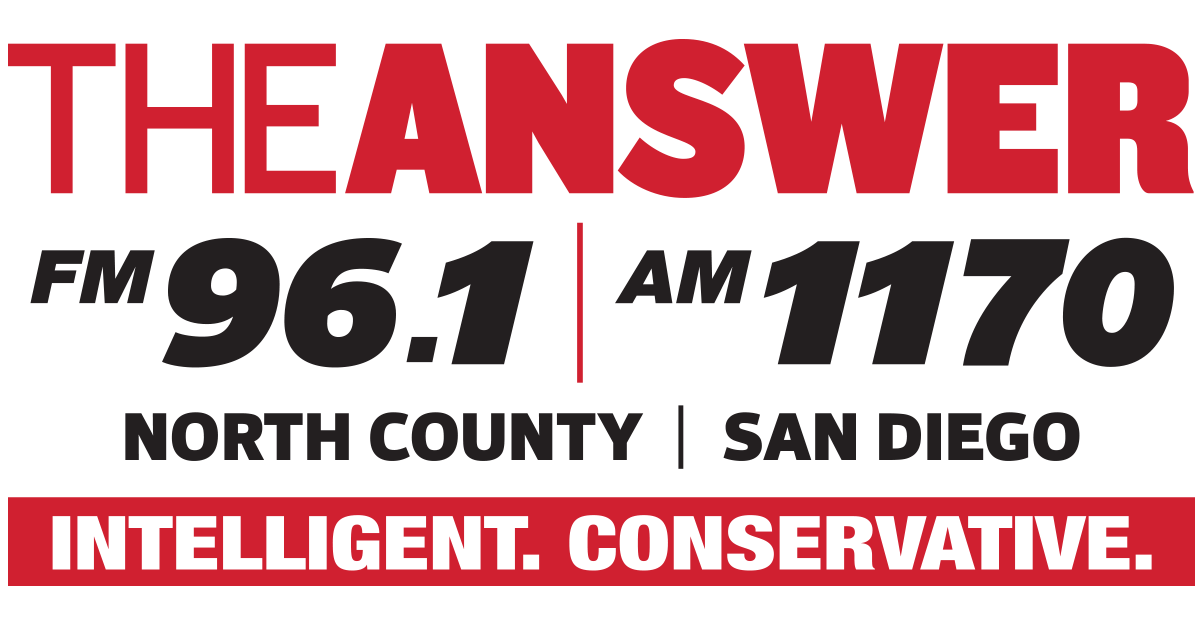
- San Diego, California; United States
- Broadcast area: San Diego-Tijuana metropolitan area
- Frequency: 1170 kHz
- Branding: 96.1 and 1170 The Answer

Programming
- Format: Conservative talk radio
- Affiliations: Salem Radio Network; Townhall News

Ownership
- Owner: Salem Media Group; (New Inspiration Broadcasting Company, Inc.)
- Sister stations: KPRZ

History
- First air date: 1946 (as KSDJ)
- Former call signs: KSDJ (1946–1949)
- Call sign meaning: "CBS Quality" (KCBQ was a CBS affiliate in the 1950s).

Technical information
- Licensing authority: FCC
- Facility ID: 13509
- Class: B
- Power: 50,000 watts day 2,900 watts night
- Transmitter coordinates: 32°53′42.2″N 116°55′34.1″W
- Translator: 96.1 K241CT (Oceanside)

Links
- Public license information: Public file; LMS
- Webcast: Listen Live
- Website: theanswersandiego.com

KCBQ (1170 AM "The Answer") is a commercial radio station in San Diego, California. It is owned by Salem Media Group and airs a conservative talk radio format. Studios and offices are on Towne Center Drive in San Diego's University City area. The transmitter is off Moreno Avenue in Lakeside, California. By day, KCBQ operates at 50,000 watts, the maximum power for American AM stations. Because KCBQ is not a clear-channel station, it must reduce its power at night to 2900 watts to avoid interfering with Class A stations KOTV in Tulsa, Oklahoma, and WWVA in Wheeling, West Virginia, both clear-channel stations. KCBQ uses a directional antenna at all times.

KCBQ used a Top 40 format in the 1950s, 1960s and 1970s, later airing country music and oldies formats in the 1980s and 1990s, before switching to talk.

== History ==
1170 first signed on the air in 1946. Its original call sign was KSDJ (for its owner the San Diego Daily Journal). The station began broadcasting from its first studio at 5th and Ash (later to become the studios of KFMB AM-FM-TV), becoming San Diego's second CBS network affiliate (KGB had been San Diego's first CBS affiliate during the 1930s). In October 1948, KSDJ was sold to Charles Eliot Salik, and the KSDJ call letters were changed to KCBQ, for "Columbia Broadcasting Quality", effective just after midnight on January 1, 1949. The call letters "KCBS" had been sought, but the CBS network wanted them for its network-owned station in San Francisco. An "agreement" was reached and Salik settled for KCBQ.

In 1951, KCBQ moved its studios to the Imig Manor Hotel (now the Lafayette) on El Cajon Blvd. KCBQ's transmitter site was next to the Campus Drive-In at El Cajon Boulevard and College Ave. The drive-in was demolished in the late 1970s and is now the Campus Shopping Center.

KCBQ's power until 1958 was 5,000 watts non-directional day and 1,000 watts non-directional night. The station used an RCA BTA-5F 5,000 watt transmitter at the College site. KFSD (now KOGO) used the same model transmitter.

Bartell Family Radio bought KCBQ in 1955 and dropped the CBS affiliation as network radio was losing its luster in the face of competition from television. In 1956 the station spent a few months in an old Victorian house during a gap between the end of their lease at the Imig Manor and the completion of the new glass studios at the El Cortez Center at 7th and Ash. Those studios are dedicated in 1957 with a live broadcast from an outdoor stage featuring the music of Bill Green's Big Band. The new studios had a large "picture window" studio that looked out over the street so that fans could watch their favorite disc jockeys on the air. There was even a mirror mounted over the console so that from the street you could watch the DJ's every move at the controls. The studios were featured in Life Magazine in 1958. This would be the home of one of the nation's pioneering Top 40 stations for the next 11 years.

In 1958, the station increased its power to 50,000 watts directional daytime and 5000 watts directional nighttime with a huge $50,000 treasure hunt giveaway to publicize the power increase. The transmitter site was moved from College and El Cajon Boulevard to a new site in then-remote, bucolic Santee. The boosted power was more of an appeal to ad agencies than an actual reception improvement with virtually all of the signal being shot out over the Pacific Ocean. KCBQ was still difficult to hear more than about 20 miles to the north at night.

In 1968, the studios moved to the Santee transmitter site where they remained through several ownership changes, until being purchased by Salem Broadcasting in the 1990s. The site was demolished and the transmitter site moved even further east to relatively undeveloped Lakeside, sharing towers with Family Radio's KECR 910. The former Santee transmitter site now bears a monument to its famous 50-year tenant.

KCBQ began broadcasting Top 40 music in the late 1950s and continued with the format through the 1960s and 1970s.

By the mid-1970s, the station had begun a series of ownership and format changes that continued on a fairly regular basis. In 1978, with music-formatted radio becoming dominated by FM stations, KCBQ dropped top 40 in favor of an adult contemporary format, to be followed in 1980 by a switch to country music. PD Bob McKay, in 1985 the station changed to a syndicated "first decade of rock 'n' roll" oldies format, Kool Gold, which carried it through most of the 1990s. It would later simulcast then-sister KKLQ. KCBQ was put up for sale in late 1995, and Salem Media Group acquired it the following summer. Upon the closure of the acquisition on July 4, 1996, music programming ended and KCBQ, like other AM stations at that point, became a talk radio station full time.

On August 28, 2010, a monument to the "Top 40" days between 1958 and 1978 was dedicated near the site of the former broadcast center and radio towers. The dedication was attended by more than 400 people. Located in the 9400 block of Mission Gorge Road, the monument has over 100 names of on-air personalities. Funding for the monument was raised by alumni and fans of KCBQ radio. KCBQ is often recognized as a pioneer in Top 40 radio and it is rare for a community to erect a monument in honor of a radio station.

In 2011, San Diegan Mike Zuccaro launched the "Saturday Night Sock Hop". A brokered show, it was formatted as a throwback to the early Top-40 days of KCBQ. It featured doo-wop, early R&B and oldies music on Saturday and Sunday evenings. This put KCBQ as a full service station (hybrid talk and music). Though Zuccaro discontinued his program, other music programming remains among the weekend brokered schedule.

On January 5, 2015, KCBQ rebranded as "1170 The Answer". Salem uses the moniker "The Answer" for many of its talk stations across the country.

In August 2018, KCBQ received an FM translator at 96.1 FM. It slightly rebranded as 96.1 and 1170 The Answer. Today, the station broadcasts almost complete wall-to-wall syndication, however, the station still has sales offices in the University City area.

== Programming ==
KCBQ is the San Diego affiliate for Salem's line up of conservative nationally syndicated hosts, which include, but are not limited to Mike Gallagher, Dennis Prager, Hugh Hewitt, Larry Elder and Sebastian Gorka. In an effort to provide some local programming, live and local host Andrea Kaye has a public affairs program, which airs in the evenings. This program uses studios at the KCBQ sales office. Weekends feature shows on money, health, food, law, and cars. Some hours on weekdays and weekends are reserved for brokered programming.

== Transmitting facilities ==
KCBQ featured a 50,000 watt transmitter (limited to 5000 watts at night, later reduced to 1500 watts nighttime). The antenna was originally a six-element directional array in the city of Santee off of Mission Gorge Road.

The antenna site was sold amidst urban development in the area, and is now a shopping center, anchored by a Kohl's and a Lowe's. For a time the station had to broadcast at reduced power from a temporary longwire antenna on long time competitor's tower 1360 KGB/KLSD and 101.5 KGB-FM, as well as the former FM side of competitor 910 radio KDEO/KECR (now Channel 933 KHTS-FM). According to the FCC, KCBQ's daytime power on the long wire was 5,000 watts, with power reduced after sunset to 675 watts (non-directional, both day and night).

KCBQ received a construction permit for a five-tower array in the area north of Lakeside, not far from the old site, and to increase power to 50,000 watts daytime, 2,900 watts nighttime. The station returned to 50,000 watts on Monday, June 4, 2007. KCBQ is now sharing antennas with 910 KECR, another former AM top 40 competitor of KCBQ's in the first half of the 1960s.

In October 2016, Salem Communications purchased K260CG, an FM translator station in Mohave Valley, Arizona. K260CG was then relocated to San Diego. It relays AM 1170 onto 96.1 FM. As a consequence, the serial callsign became K241CT, and went on the air in August 2018. The FM transmitter's power is 0.25 kilowatts directional, and is only received in the North County area, in order to avoid co-channel interference with KYDO, which has used the 96.1 frequency since 2013.

== In fiction ==
The KCBQ studio at 7th Avenue and Ash Street in San Diego, California, appeared in a street scene from an episode of the American television series "Perry Mason" ("The Case of the Cowardly Lion," Season 4, Episode 22 (1961)).
