= Carson Gulley =

American chef

- Born: June 9, 1897; Zama, Nevada County, Arkansas
- Died: November 2, 1962 (aged 65)

Carson Gulley (June 9, 1897 – November 2, 1962) was head chef at the University of Wisconsin–Madison from 1926 to 1954. He is known in part for popularizing a recipe for fudge-bottom pie that is still served on campus today. The refectory where he once served as head chef is now known as Carson Gulley Commons. It was the first university building at the University of Wisconsin–Madison to be named after an African American.

Gulley was also a local pioneer in television and radio cooking programming. From 1953 to 1962, Gulley had his own weekly cooking show, called What's Cooking, on local television station WMTV. Also, in 1953, he hosted a twice-weekly local radio cooking program, called WIBA Cooking School of the Air, and each month compiled the program's recipes in booklets that listeners could request by mail. He and his wife Beatrice were the first African American couple to host their own television show in Wisconsin in the 1950s.

He led the Madison branch of the NAACP. Having failed for many years to buy a house in Madison, he made an emotional appeal to the Madison City Council's Committee on Human Rights. This in part led to the City Council passing a Fair Housing Ordinance.

He published his first book Seasoning Secrets: Herbs and Spices in 1949 at the suggestion of George Washington Carver.

== Early life ==
Gulley was born in Zama, Nevada County, Arkansas to a family of sharecroppers. He was one of ten children.

== Bibliography ==
- Seasoning Secrets: Herbs and Spices, 1949; revised 1956
