= San Diego–Tijuana =

Transborder agglomeration of the Californias

- Transborder Agglomeration of the Californias
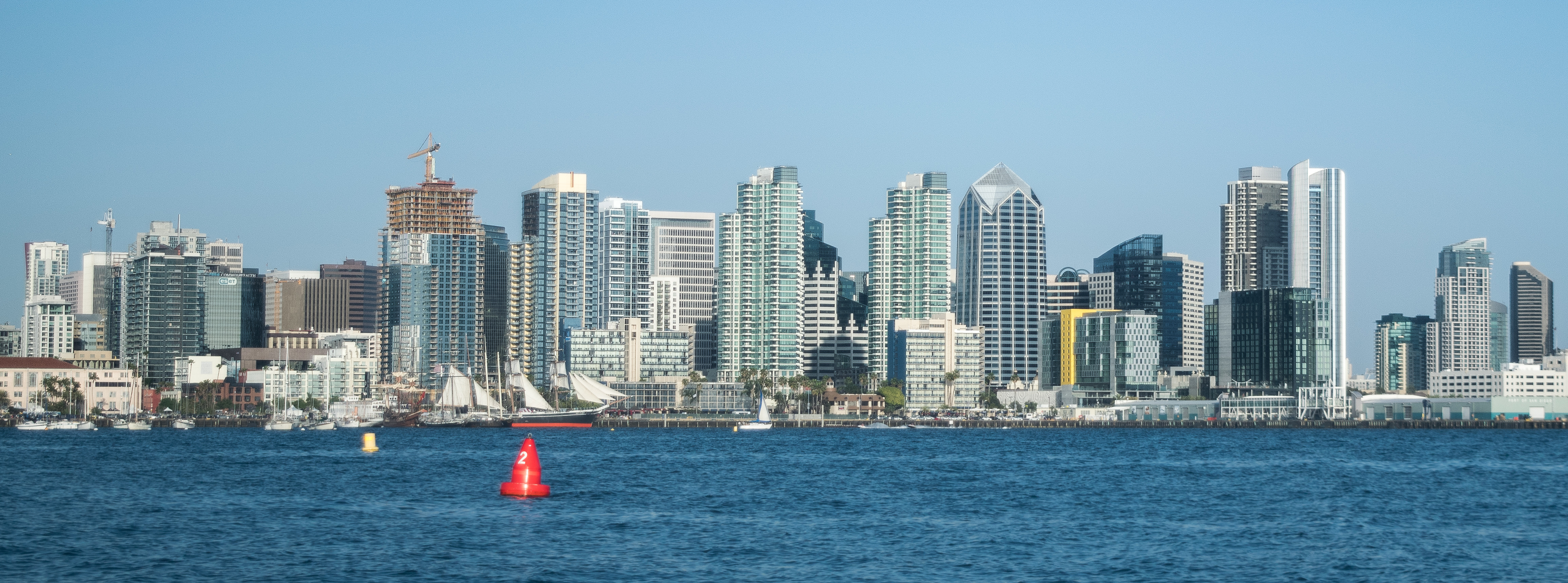
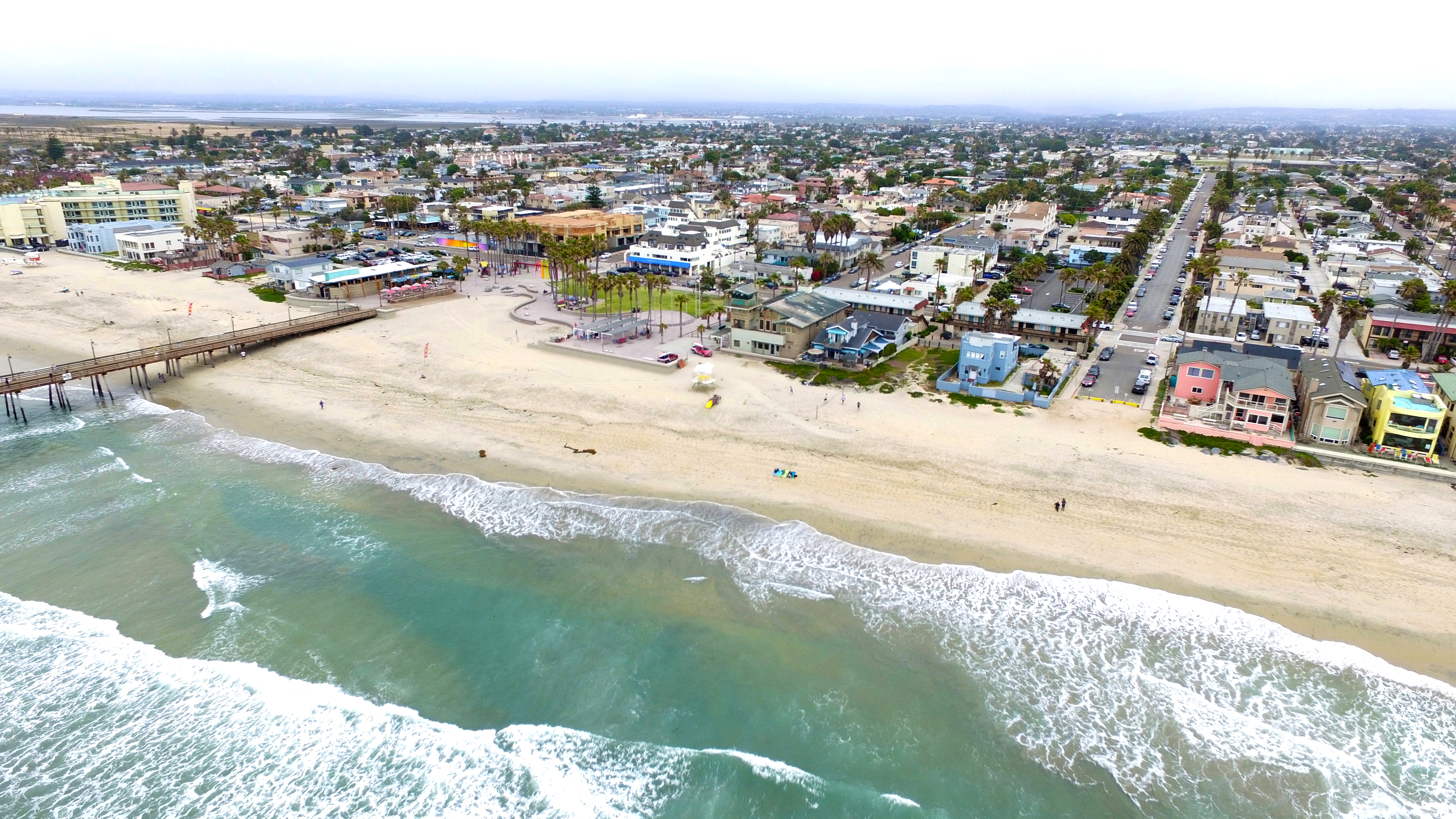
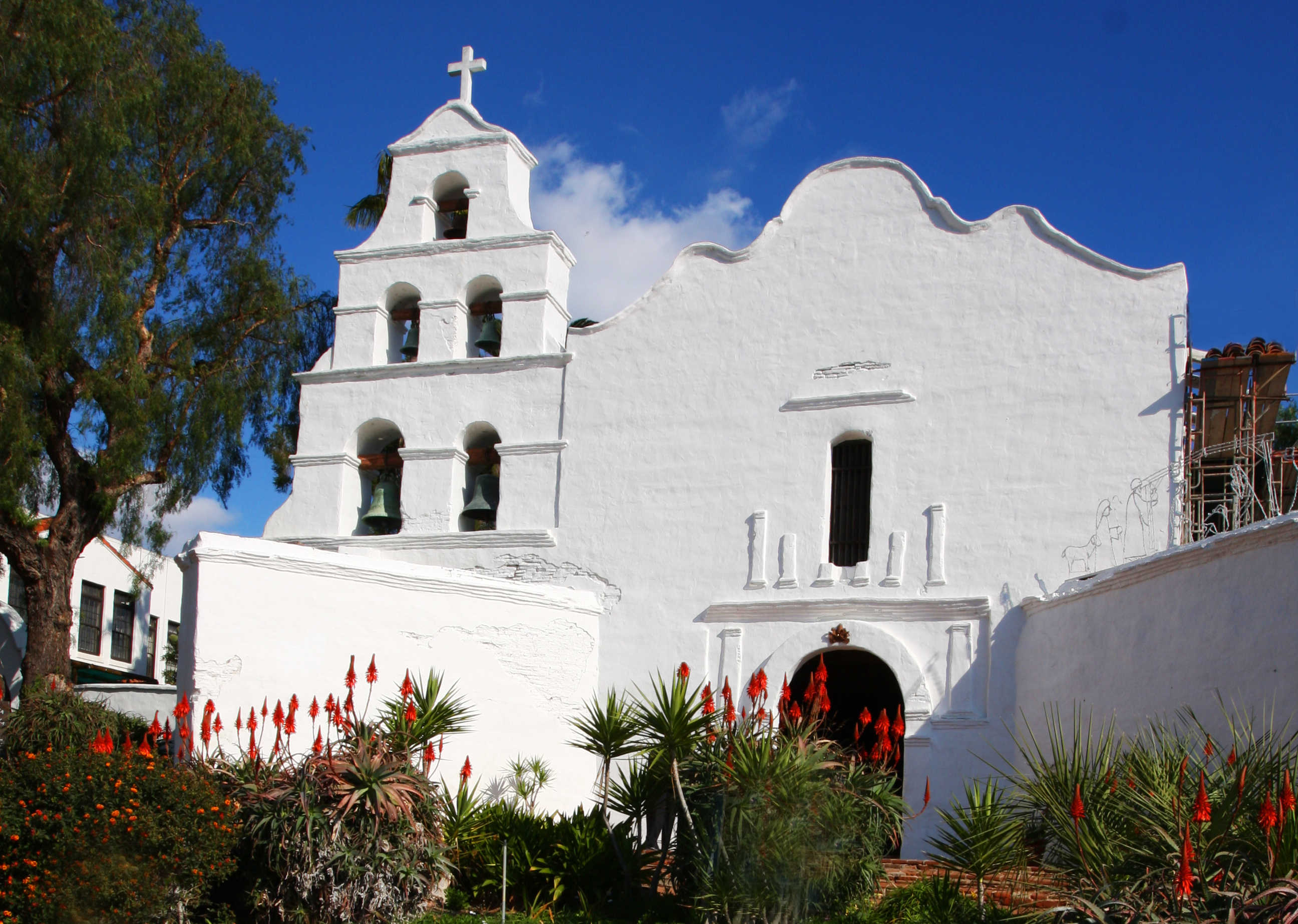
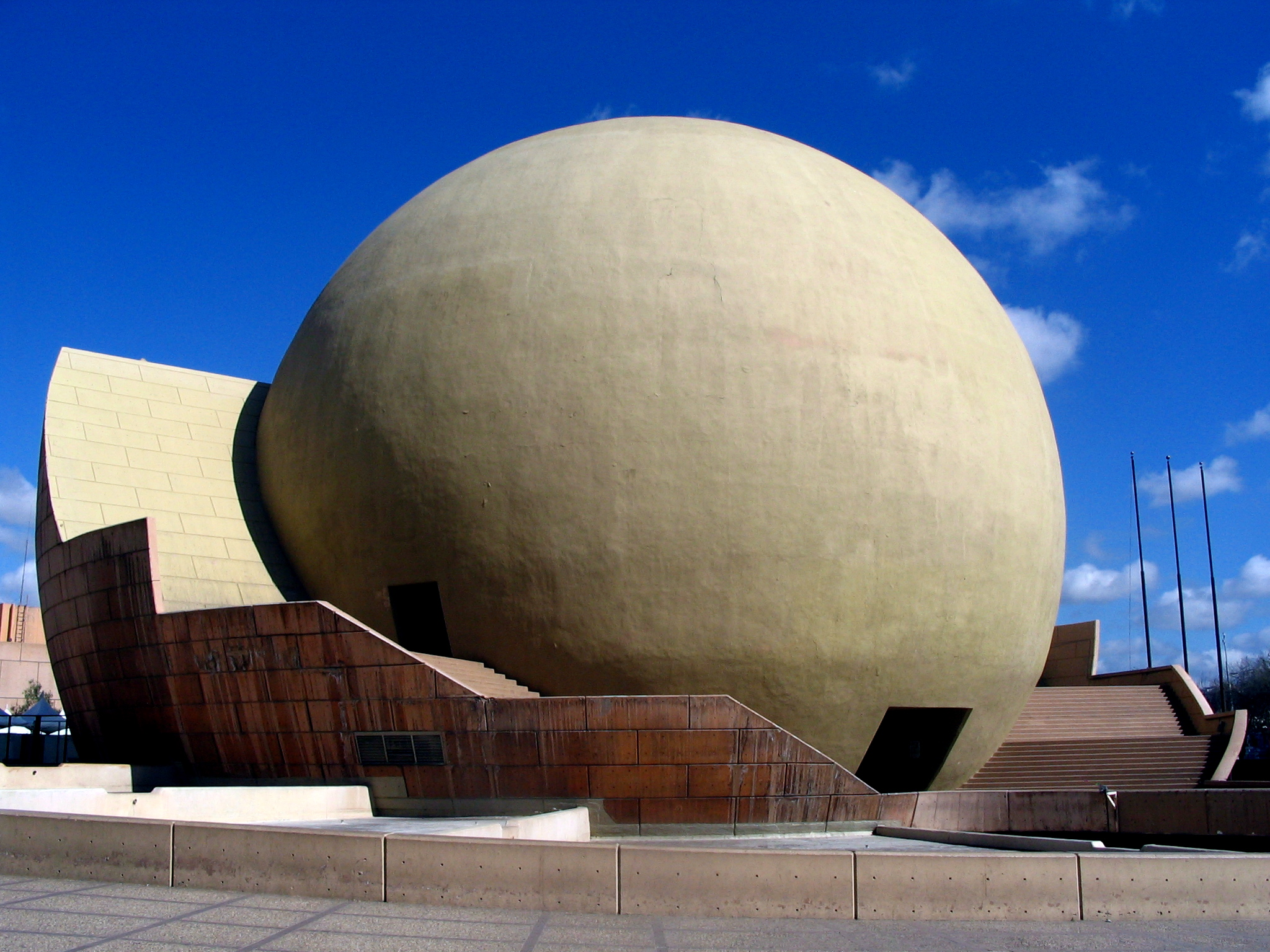
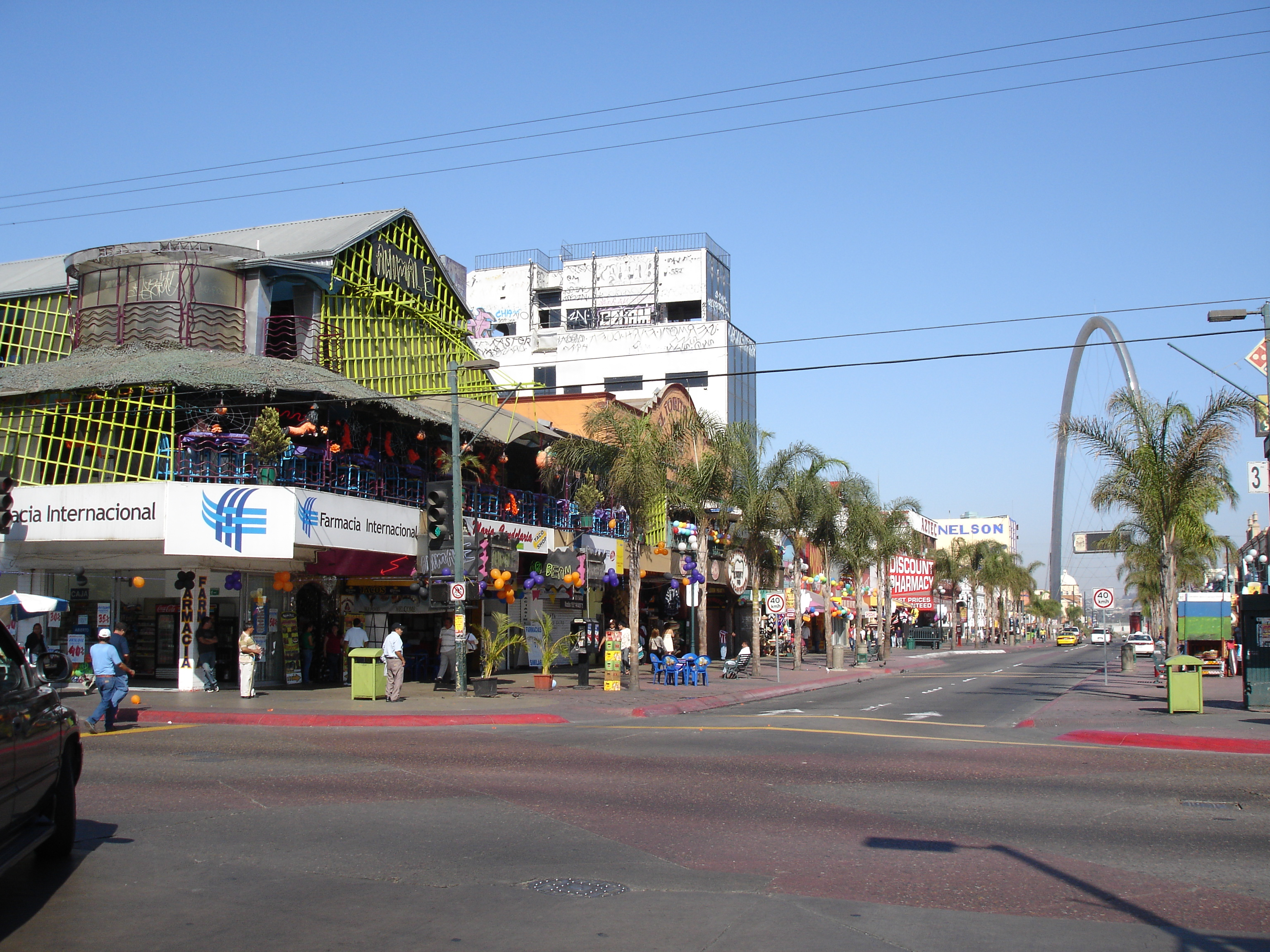
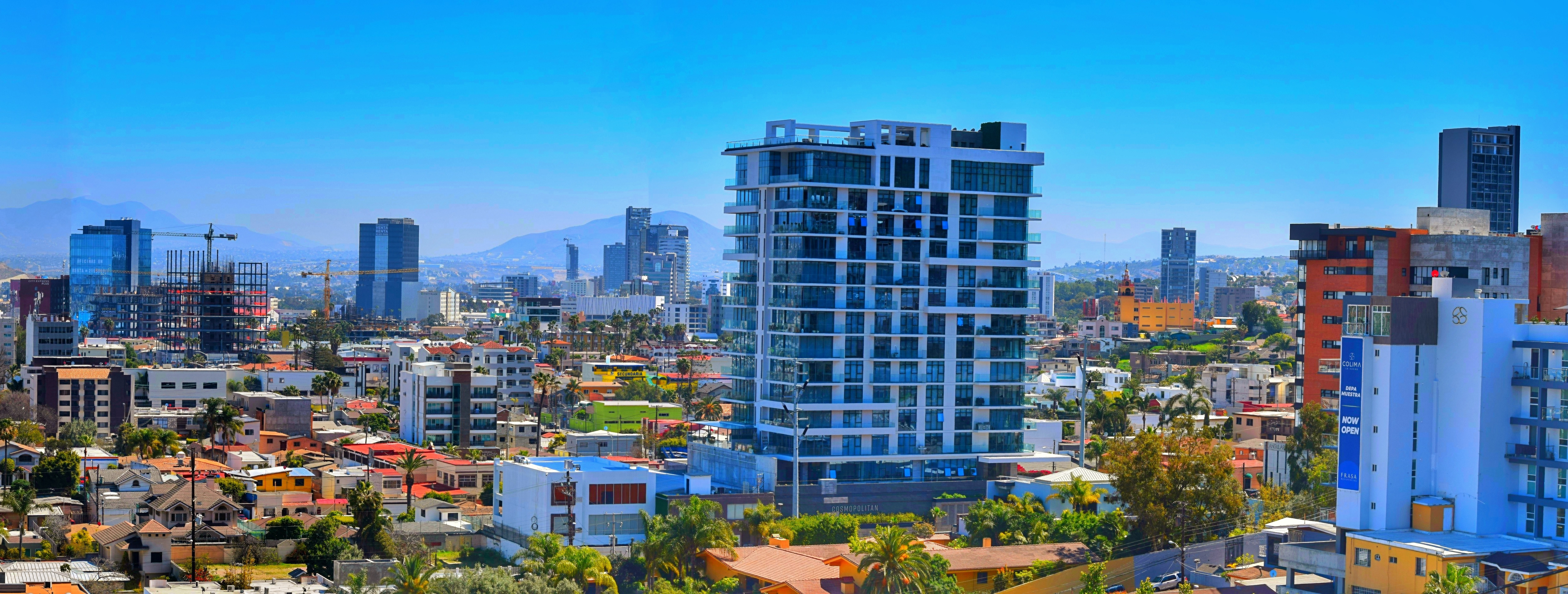
- Downtown San Diego Imperial Beach Mission San Diego Tijuana Cultural Center Avenida Revolución and Tijuana Arch Downtown Tijuana
Interactive Map of San Diego–Tijuana urban area
City of San Diego
South Bay Cities
North County Cities
East County Cities
Marine Corps Base Camp Pendleton
Tijuana, Baja California
Tecate, Baja California
Playas de Rosarito, Baja California
- Countries: United States; Mexico
- States: California; Baja California
- Largest city by population: Tijuana
- Largest city by area: San Diego
- Principal cities: San Diego; Tijuana

Area
  - Transborder Agglomeration of the Californias: 6,194 sq mi (16,040 km^{2})
- Elevation: 0–6,532 ft (0–1,991 m)

Population (2012 est.)
  - Density: 1,020/sq mi (394/km^{2})
  - Urban: 5,456,487
  - Metro: 4,922,723

GDP
  - San Diego: US$314.9 billion
  - Tijuana: US$32.4 billion
  - San Diego–Tijuana: US$347.3 billion
- Time zone: UTC−08:00 (Zona Noroeste)
  - Summer (DST): UTC−07:00 (DST)

San Diego–Tijuana is an international transborder agglomeration, straddling the border of the adjacent North American coastal cities of San Diego, California, United States, and Tijuana, Baja California, Mexico. The 2020 population of the region was 5,456,577, making it the largest bi-national conurbation shared between the United States and Mexico, and the second-largest shared between the US and another country. The conurbation consists of San Diego County, (2020 population 3,298,634) in the United States and the municipalities of Tijuana (2020 pop. 1,922,523), Rosarito Beach (126,980), and Tecate (108,440) in Mexico. It is the third-most populous region in the California–Baja California region, smaller only than the metropolitan areas of Greater Los Angeles and the San Francisco Bay Area.

San Diego–Tijuana traces its European roots to 1542, when the land was explored by Portuguese explorers on behalf of the Spanish Empire. In 1601, it was mandated by the Spanish viceroy in Mexico City that safe ports be found, one of which would be San Diego Bay, for ships of the Manila galleon. During this mission, explorer Sebastián Vizcaíno was also told to map the California coast in great detail, leading to the further exploration of the modern-day site of San Diego–Tijuana.

The metropolitan region is host to 13 consulates for several countries. Over fifty million people cross the border each year between San Diego and Tijuana; it is the busiest land-border crossing in the Western Hemisphere. Since the implementation of the North American Free Trade Agreement (NAFTA) in 1994, San Diego–Tijuana has become a dominant commercial center in the United States and Mexico. The economic success of globalization has allowed San Diego–Tijuana to grow to the third richest region in the former Californias region, with a GDP of $136.3 billion in 2002. Tourism is a leading industry in the region and its coastal environs have been paramount factors in the growth of action sports–lifestyle companies; other key industries include military, biotech, and manufacturing. Since 2010, statewide droughts in California and in northern Mexico have further strained the San Diego–Tijuana binational region's water security.

== History ==
The Kumeyaay, referred to as Diegueño by the Spanish, are the original inhabitants of San Diego County and northern Baja California. The Kumeyaay lived in this region for over 10,000 years as hunter-gatherers and horticulturists. The boundaries of the Kumeyaay lands once extended from the Pacific Ocean, south to Ensenada, Baja California, east into the Imperial Valley and north to Warner Springs. The Luiseño, or Payómkawichum, also had a presence in modern-day North County San Diego.

Western exploration of the Californias dates back to the 16th century when in 1535 Hernán Cortés first visited the Baja California Peninsula in his search for Calafia. Subsequent exploration in 1542 by Juan Rodríguez Cabrillo brought the western explorers to what is now the California-Baja California region. Cabrillo first named San Diego, San Miguel. Initial expeditions by the west to the Californias were followed by pacification and conversion efforts by the Spanish Empire and the Catholic Church. The first Catholic religious order to visit the region was the Jesuits in 1683, followed by the Franciscans in 1768, and the Dominicans in the 1770s. The California mission system is a reminder of the Pacific Coast's colonial era.

In 1769 Father Junípero Serra founded San Diego after occupying the Kumeyaay village of Kosa'aay and created the first of the California missions, Mission San Diego de Alcalá. The Valley of Tijuana was explored the same year by Juan Crespí. In 1829 Santiago Argüello, a Californio and a major Mexican land grant ranchos owner, obtained ownership of a parcel of land known as Rancho Tía Juana and in 1889 was Tijuana officially founded on this parcel when descendants of Argüello and Agustin Olvera, an early Los Angeles pioneer, agreed to develop the city.

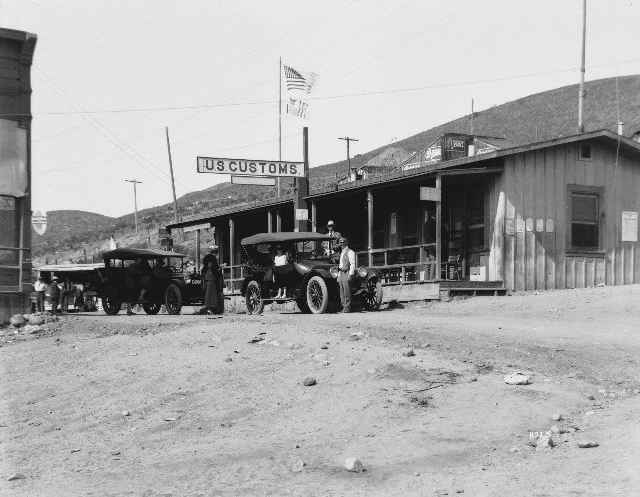
San Ysidro Border Inspection Station in 1922

The metropolitan region was historically united as part of the province of Alta California under the Viceroyalty of New Spain. In 1821, Mexico won its independence from the Spanish crown and kept the area under the jurisdiction of Alta California. From the late 1860s Mission lands were granted as ranchos to Californio gentry. These distributions of lands accelerated after the Missions were secularized in 1833, ending the dominance of the Missions in the economy. San Diego Bay became a port of call for whalers and hide traders from the United States.

The region started depopulating, as settlements in the region began to be raided between 1836 and 1842 by the Kumeyaay resistance, with both Rancho Tía Juana (1839) and San Diego (~1840 & 1842) raided during that period.

In 1846, the Mexican–American War began and the United States continued to expand its borders under the doctrine of Manifest Destiny. As the war came to California, the Battle of San Pasqual was fought in the northern areas of modern-day San Diego. In 1848 the war ended with the Fall of Mexico City and boundaries were redrawn which created a border between San Diego and Tijuana, 3 miles (4.8 km) south of San Diego Bay. 1919 saw the implementation of Prohibition and the rapid growth of Tijuana tourism. Americans flocked to the city, which had become a major destination for the Hollywood elite, which led to the construction of the Agua Caliente Tourist Complex which in turn spurred the rise of hotels and overall growth in the city.

== Urban landscape ==
San Diego–Tijuana urbanity stretches along the coastline from the northernmost city of Oceanside to the southernmost city of Rosarito Beach. The urban area of San Diego–Tijuana is the 152nd most populous in the world and 21st most populous in North America, with a population of 5,330,000.

The highest population densities are located in the San Diego neighborhoods of University City, La Jolla, Mission Valley, Pacific Beach the downtown San Diego district of the East Village among others, and areas of Tijuana. An area of 116 census tracts in the North County region of the conurbation has a population of 615,092 and a per capita income of $44,131 which is about 50 percent more than that of California and the entire United States. This area contains nearly all of the area located in the cities of Carlsbad, Encinitas, Solana Beach, and Del Mar. A part of this region are the communities of Rancho Santa Fe, Carmel Valley and La Jolla which have consistently been among the ranks of some of the richest neighborhoods in the United States.

Outside of the urban centers, older regions of San Diego County south of the San Diego River, as well as La Jolla and Pacific Beach, are built on a street grid. Suburban growth north of the San Diego river were built as master planned suburban communities on top of mesas with the "city of villages" concept in mind, built around car-dependency. Tijuana's suburban landscape is made up densely packed low-density mixed land uses, with patches of street grids east of the city and more organic growth influenced by topography. Cities like Tecate and Rosarito are built on street grid systems.

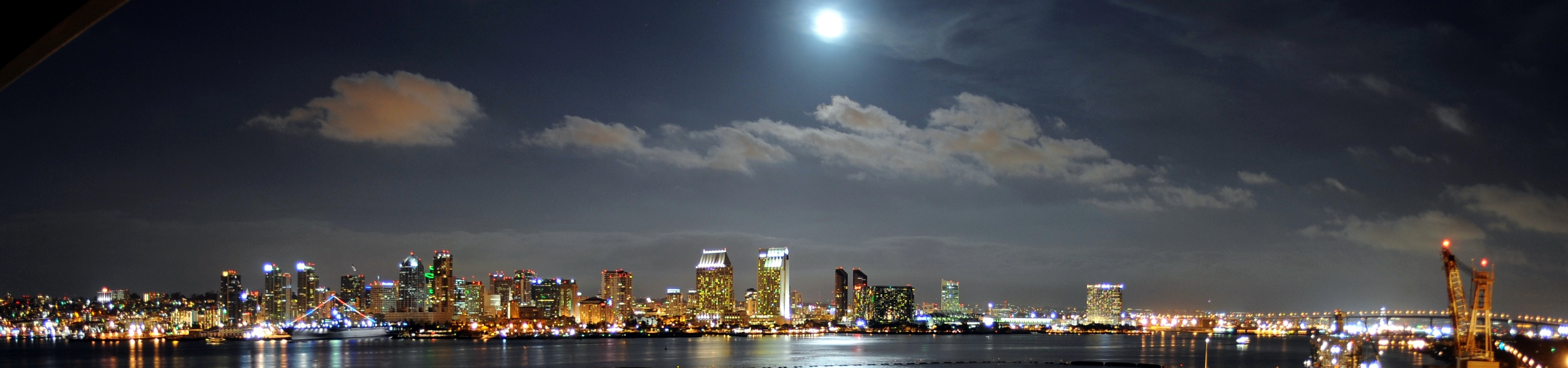
The downtown San Diego skyline seen at night. At 2.1 miles (3.4 km) long, the Coronado Bay Bridge stands as the longest bridge in the region and Southern California.

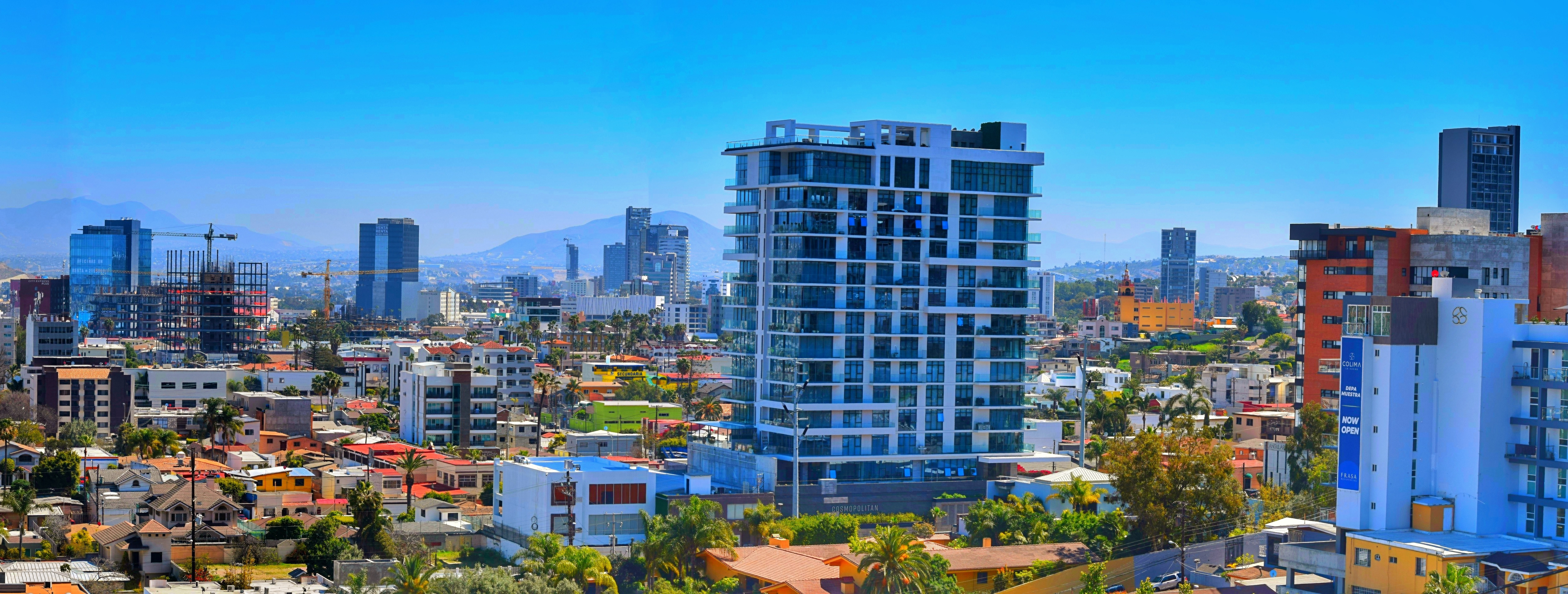
Tijuana skyline from the Colonia La Cacho

== Geography ==
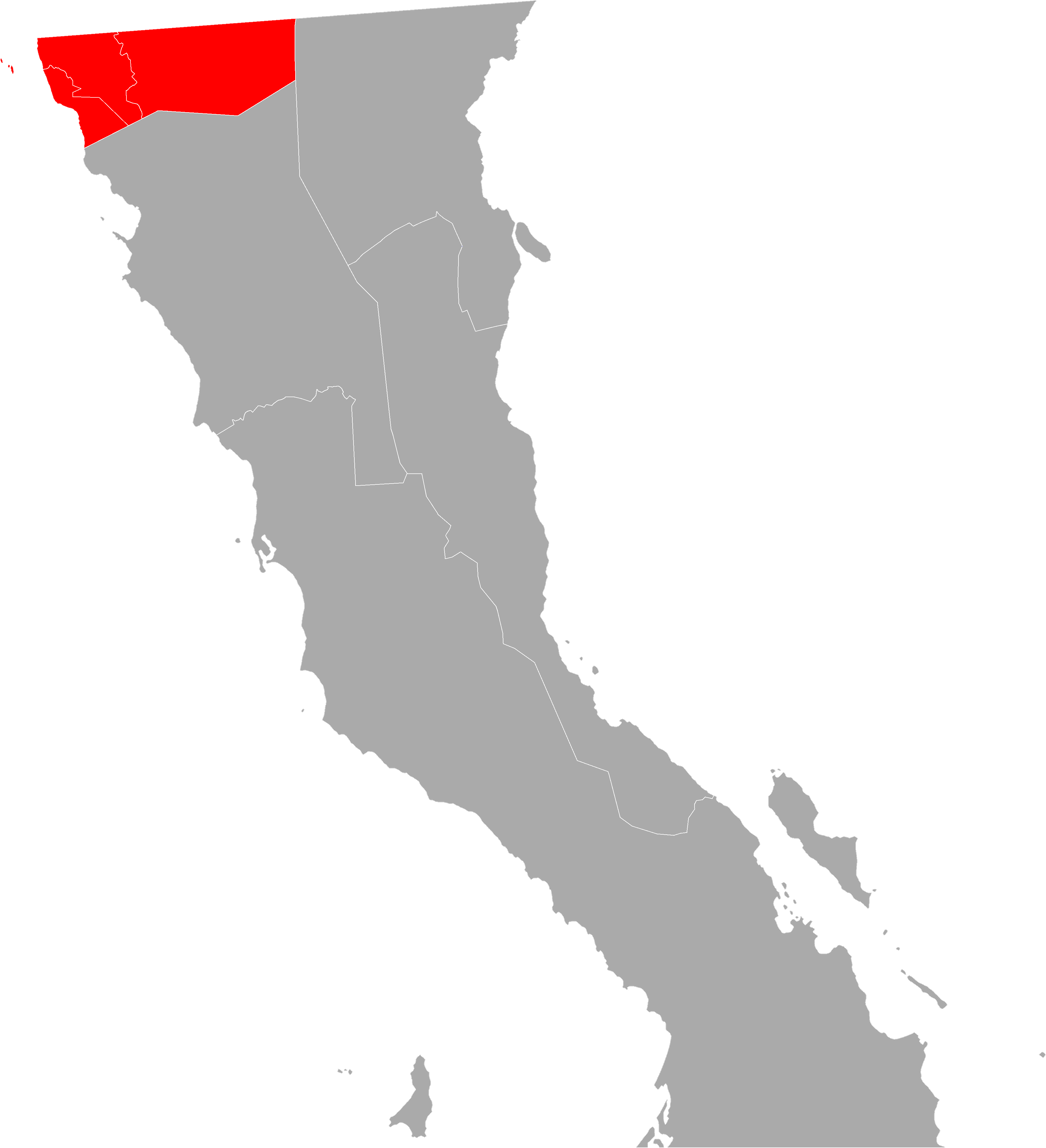
San Diego County and Rosarito Beach, Tijuana, and Tecate municipalities

The metropolitan region is situated along the Pacific coast, on the border between the United States and Mexico. The region lies just south of Orange County and west of Imperial County, and shares borders with Greater Los Angeles. The area has a varied topography with over seventy miles of coastline and snow-capped mountains that rise to the northeast, in San Diego County. The terrain includes flood plains, canyons, steep hills, and mesas. The region has its eastern terminus in the Colorado Desert and Imperial Valley regions, where another conurbation – Mexicali–Calexico – is formed. The urbanized area where San Diego and Tijuana meet is known as San Ysidro on the American side of the border and Colonia Federal/Colonia Libertad on the Mexican side. East from the coast ten miles (16 km), the Tijuanense boroughs of Mesa de Otay and Centenario are heavy urbanized whereas the corresponding American area of Otay Mesa is composed of primarily dispersed industrial and distribution facilities. At the Pacific Ocean region of the border, the border is urbanized on the Mexican side while the adjacent American side is in Tijuana River National Estuarine Research Reserve, and thus not urbanized.

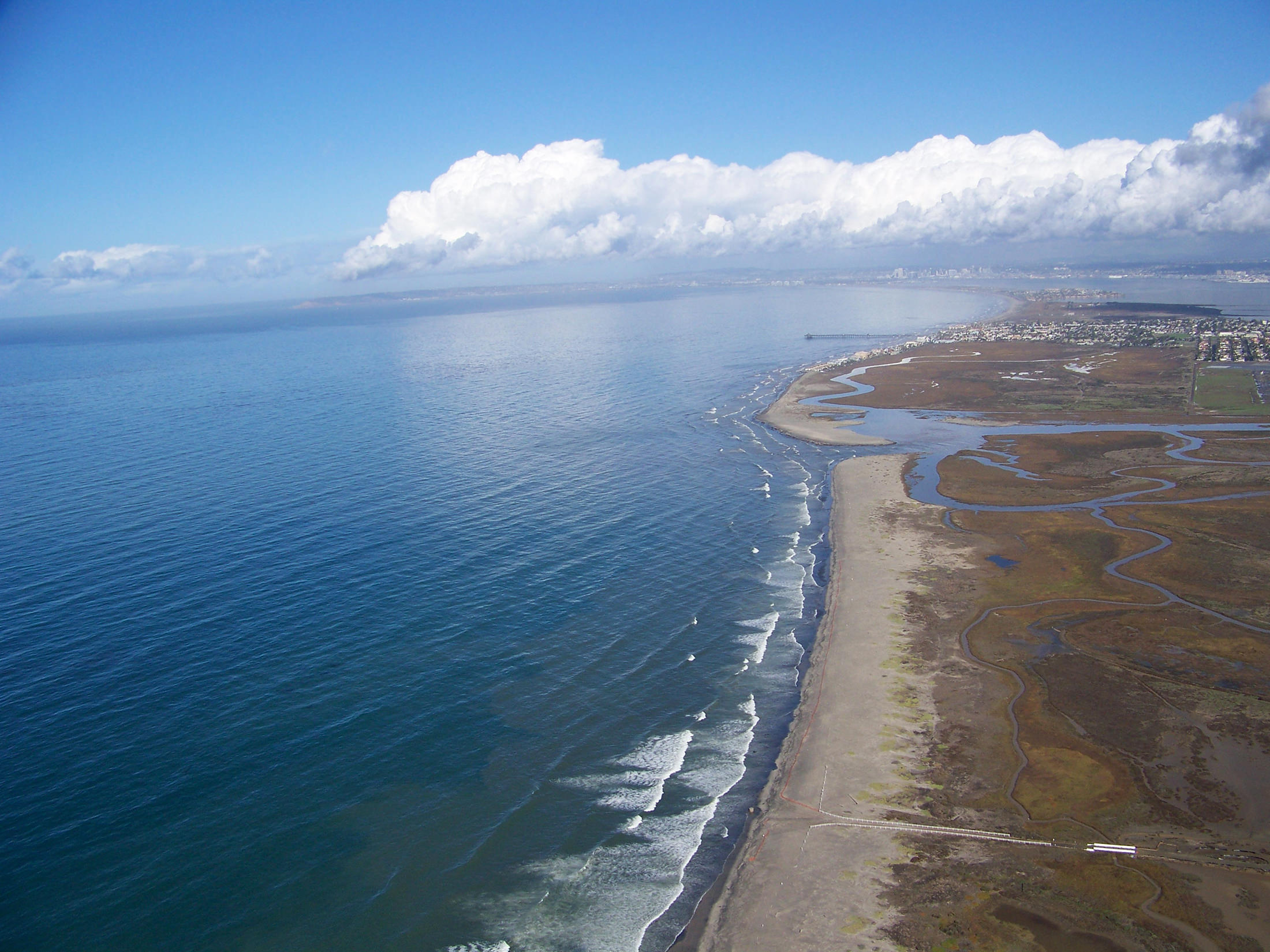
The Tijuana River National Estuarine Research Reserve

According to the U.S. Census Bureau, San Diego County has a total area of 4,526 square miles (11,720 km^{2}), of that 4,200 square miles (11,000 km^{2}) of it is land and 326 square miles (840 km^{2}) of it (7.20%) is water. The area of Tijuana Municipality is 339.5 square miles (879 km^{2}); the municipality includes part of the Coronado Islands, located off the coast of the municipality in the Pacific Ocean. This combined area, with the additional areas of Tecate, 1,188.8 square miles (3,079 km^{2}), and Rosarito Beach, 198.2 square miles (513 km^{2}), place the area of San Diego–Tijuana at 6,252.5 square miles (16,194 km^{2}).

San Diego is by far the most populated county though population density is much higher in the immediate border area adjacent to the south in Baja California than it is in San Diego County. Urban growth is currently developing regions to the east of Tijuana Municipality and south of Rosarito Beach, where developers are building many new residential communities while in San Diego it is observed to the northeast along the Interstate 15 corridor to Temecula and Murrieta.

Greater Ensenada is more frequently than not considered part of the region given its proximity and inter-connectivity with the metropolitan area. While it is ninety and seventy-four miles (145 and 119 km) from the cities of San Diego and Tijuana respectively, recent developments between the port city and Rosarito Beach including upscale, Americanized subdivisions and resorts such as Punta Azul, Baja Mar, and La Salina have greatly increased the urbanity of the corridor between Rosarito Beach and Ensenada. Transportation infrastructure increasingly binds the region, as the under-construction Ensenada International Airport is expected to serve as the third major airport of the metropolitan region, offering flights to Europe, South America, and East Asia.

=== Climate ===
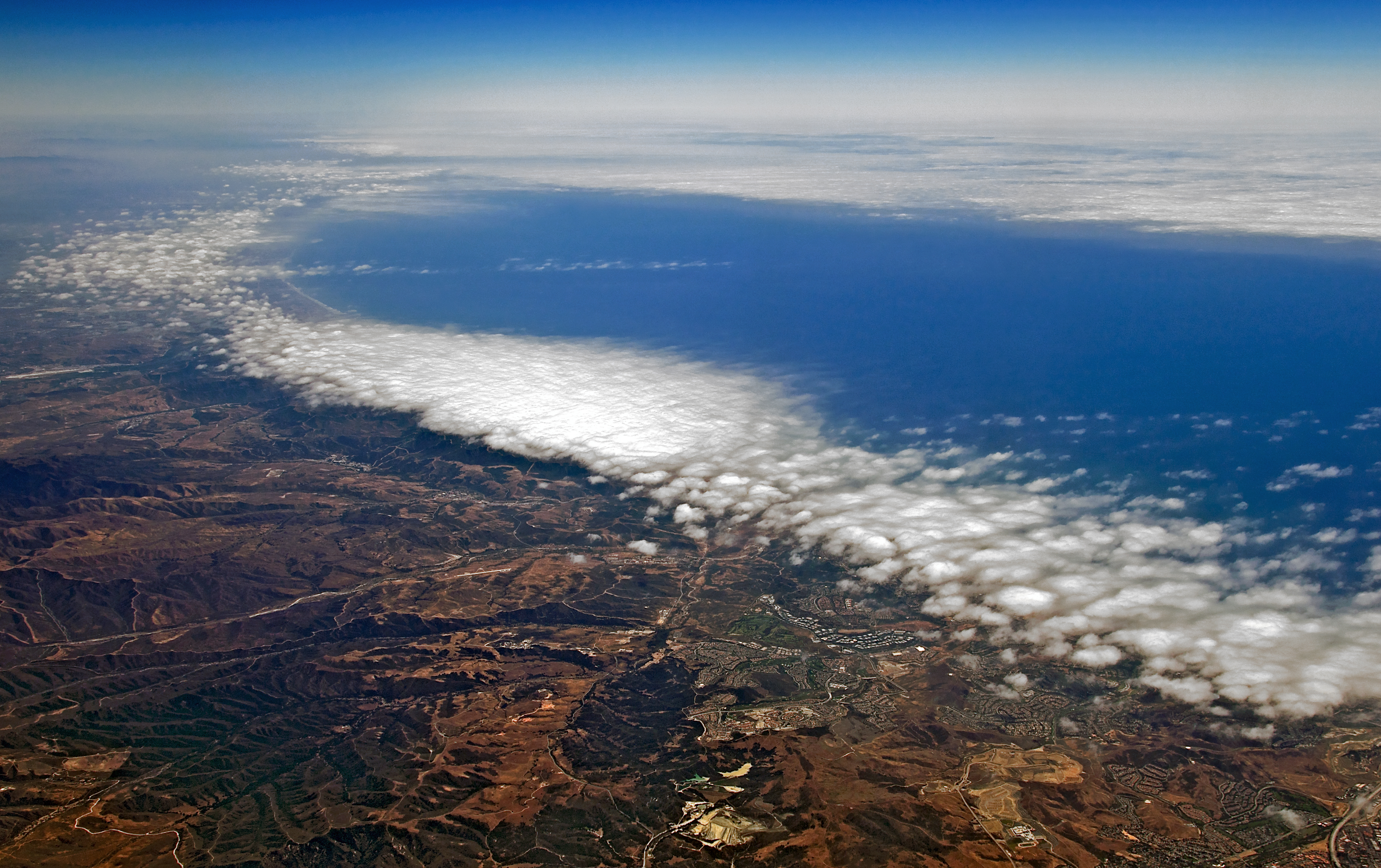
June Gloom over the South Coast

San Diego–Tijuana straddles a Mediterranean climate and semi-arid climate area. The Mediterranean climate is characterized by generally warm, dry summers on the near coastal regions with a slight temperature increase westward, and relatively cool, mild, wet winters; this is the climate that dominates northern San Diego–Tijuana. In southern San Diego–Tijuana, the semi-arid climate is observed, though characteristics of the Dry-Summer Subtropical Mediterranean climate are present, with most of the annual precipitation falling in the winter. The Peninsular Ranges assist in containing moisture to the coastal areas and create a rain shadow to the east as they are west-facing mountains.

The climate of the area often varies significantly due to the abundance of microclimates characterizing the region. San Diego–Tijuana's topography, bays, coastal hills, mountains, canyons and gorges maintain their own climates while being relatively near to each other. During the May gray and June gloom seasons, a dense cloak of coastal clouds, known as marine layer, covers the coastal areas, keeping the area cool and moist to up to 5–10 miles (8.0–16.1 km) inland. This coastal cloud cover is frequently observed reaching as far inland as Poway and in some cases, San Diego Country Estates. Yet once outside this cloud, the weather in sharp contrast can be warm and sunny. In some cases, June gloom lasts into July, creating cloudy skies over the coastal regions for entire days.

An example of the regional temperature fluctuations is shown in the varying averages of downtown San Diego, averaging January lows of 50 °F and August highs of 78 °F; El Cajon, just 10 miles (16 km) northeast of downtown San Diego, averaging January lows of 42 °F and August highs of 88 °F; Tijuana, averaging January lows of 45 °F and August highs of 78 °F. The differences are even more observed in North County, where coastal Oceanside maintains an average January low of 45 °F and August highs of 73 °F, while inland Escondido maintains average January lows of 42 °F and August highs of 89 °F.

San Diego–Tijuana is also subject to El Niño weather events. In extreme cases, the overwhelming fall of rain creates mudslides and greatly increases the flow of urban rivers. This sudden influx of water has the potential to flood populated places and drown out wetland habitat; measures have been taken to reduce this potential negative affect while simultaneously restoring the rivers and their watersheds to a pristine and natural state.

=== Ecology ===
This regional climate supports a chaparral and woodlands ecoregion that is further divided in three sub-regions where two are observed in San Diego–Tijuana. These are the coastal sage and chaparral and montane chaparral and woodlands ecoregions. In the montane region, fire serves a unique purpose as a medium of change, and while fire typically can threaten urban development, it is essential for the historically annual cleanse of the woodlands and reproduction of pyrophytes.

Southern coastal sage scrub is further observed on the coast. This is an ecoregion with extremely high levels biodiversity where its endemic species are endangered by human encroachment. In this terrestrial ecoregion, the coastal lowlands are within a semi, semi-arid Mediterranean climate, inhabited by low-growing aromatic, and drought-deciduous shrubs.

In the water, the Intertidal, estuary and kelp forest biomes support diverse marine flora and fauna. The cool nutrient-rich waters of the north Pacific are able to provide kelp forests with millions of plankton – the base of the aquatic food chain – due to an upwelling of water from the deep sea in the stormy, winter months.

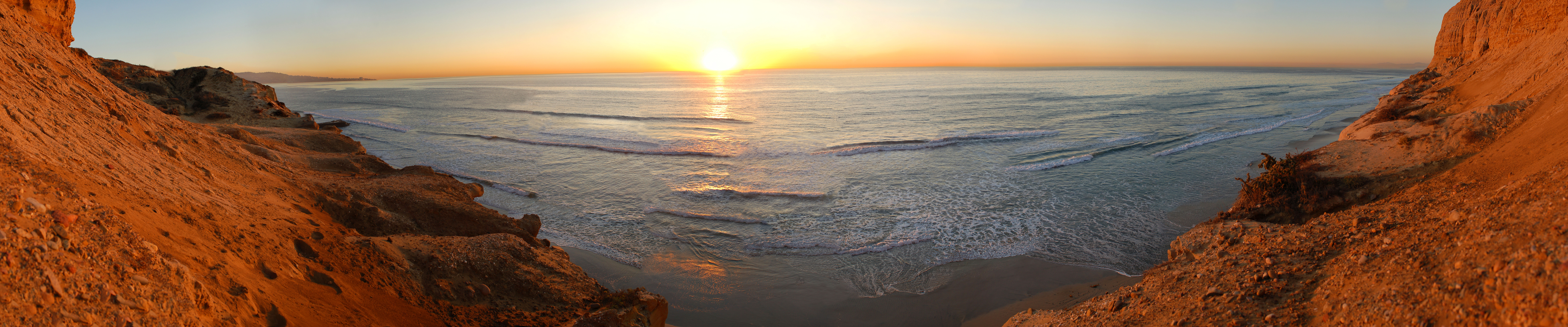
Torrey Pines State Natural Reserve, home to Pinus torreyana torreyana, the sole location worldwide of the subspecies.

=== Flora and fauna ===
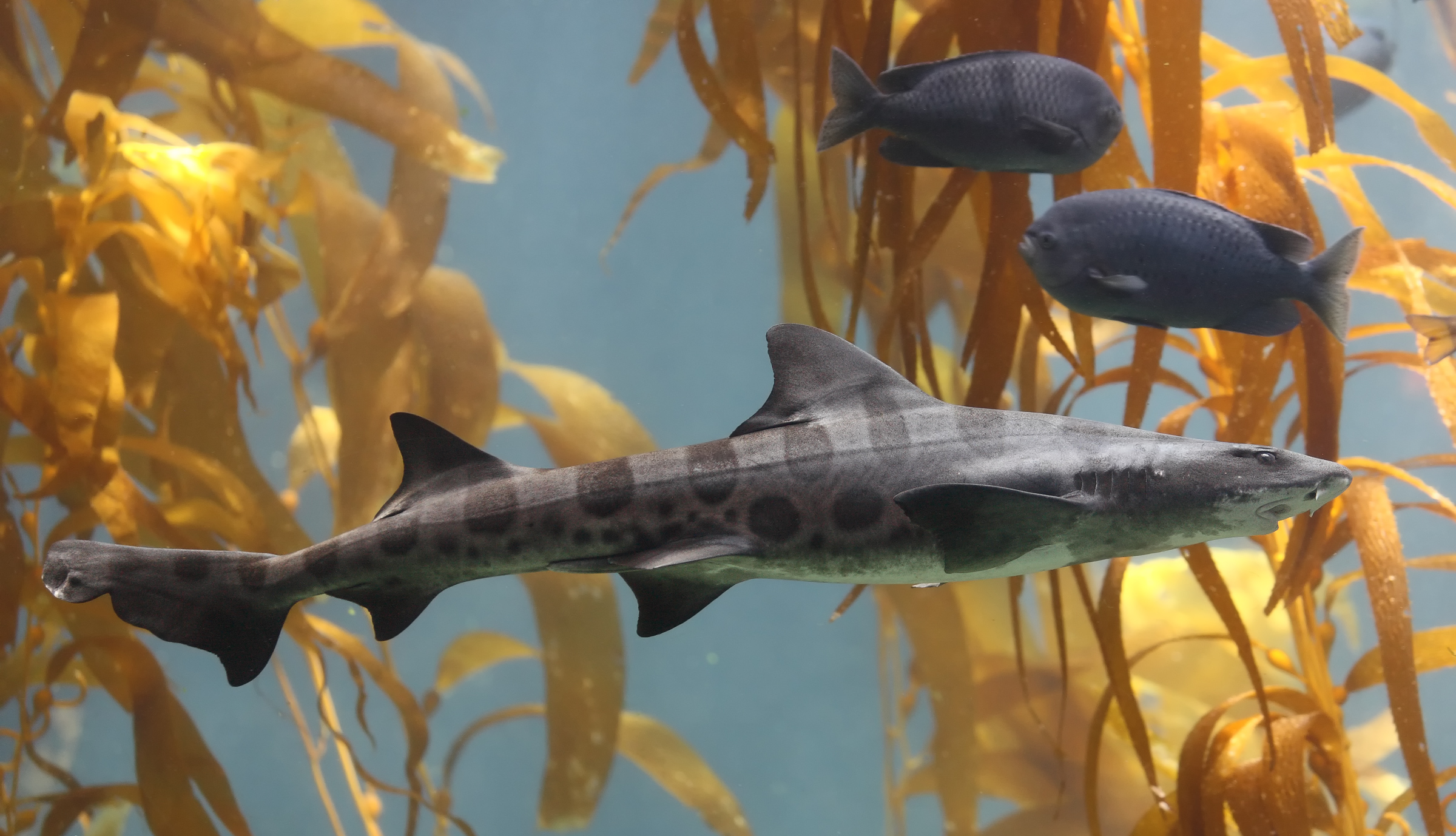
A leopard shark and two blacksmith chromis observed in kelp forest habitat at Birch Aquarium

Trees of San Diego–Tijuana included chamise, scrub oak, manzanita, live oak, lodgepole pine, black oak and closed-cone pine forests. Lowland shrubs included California sagebrush, black sage, white sage, California buckwheat, as well as cacti and succulents.

Terrestrial mammals included the mountain lion, bobcat, bighorn sheep, mule deer as well as a variety of rodents and lagomorphs including the California ground squirrel, San Diego kangaroo rat, and brush rabbit. Black bears, jaguars and sea otters historically populated the area, but their range has been restricted by human encroachment and the jaguar and the sea otter are now rarely, if ever, observed. Aquatic mammals included the gray whale, a seasonal migratory animal, as well as the bottlenose dolphin, great white shark, killer whale, and California sea lion and on rare occasion, Guadalupe fur seal. In recent times the region has seen the rebound of artiodactyls such as the Peninsular bighorn sheep, a distinct population segment of the desert bighorn sheep.

Reptiles include olive ridley sea turtle, western fence lizard, various rattlesnake species and species of blind snake and gopher snake. Amphibians included the barred tiger salamander and California tree frog. With a mostly arid climate, reptile species outnumber amphibians by a margin of seven to one.

Bird species popular to the region are the California quail, California condor, California least tern, peregrine falcon and golden eagle. Introduced parrot species such as the red-crowned amazon parrot have also been found living and breeding in San Diego County and parts of Tijuana Metro.

The waters off of the coast of San Diego–Tijuana are densely populate by the denizens of the kelp forests. Kelp forests are found to a great extent and are populated by Garibaldi, leopard sharks, gobies, rockfish, and sculpins. Great white sharks have been observed in the waters off the coast, while there are numerous documentations of their occurrence in the waters off Guadalupe Island. From the confines of the forests, ocean-going species such as the Ocean sunfish are observed.

Environmental research in climate and biodiversity is conducted at the Scripps Institution of Oceanography and by the Biodiversity Research Center of the Californias of the San Diego Natural History Museum.

== Geology ==
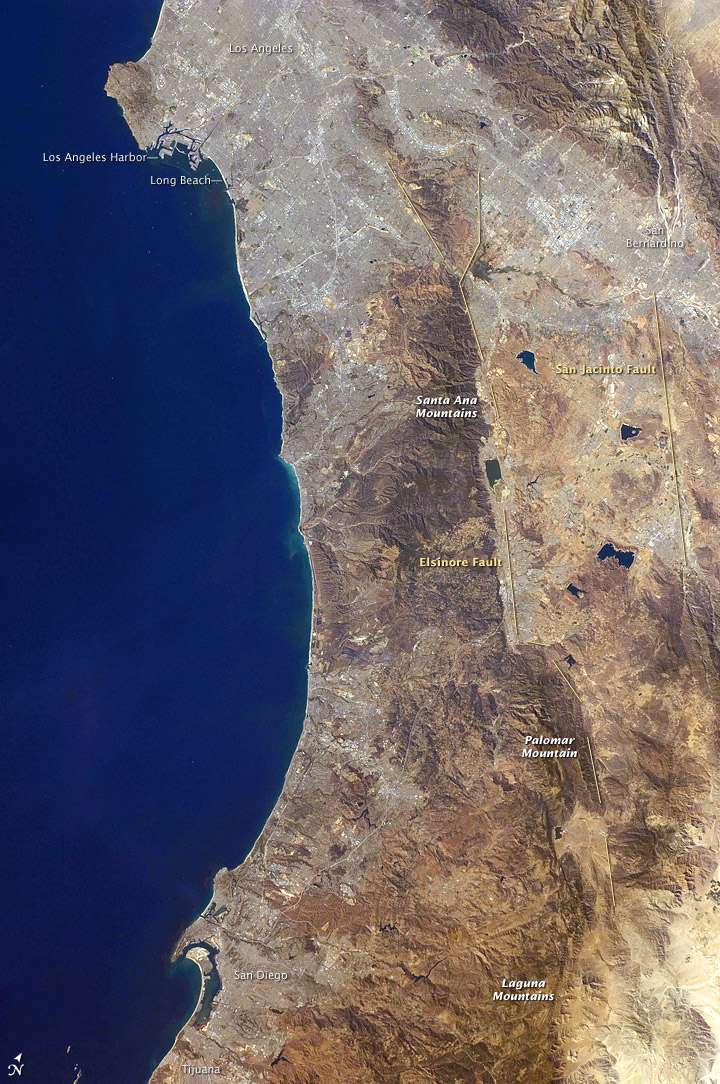
Mountains and faults within and near San Diego–Tijuana

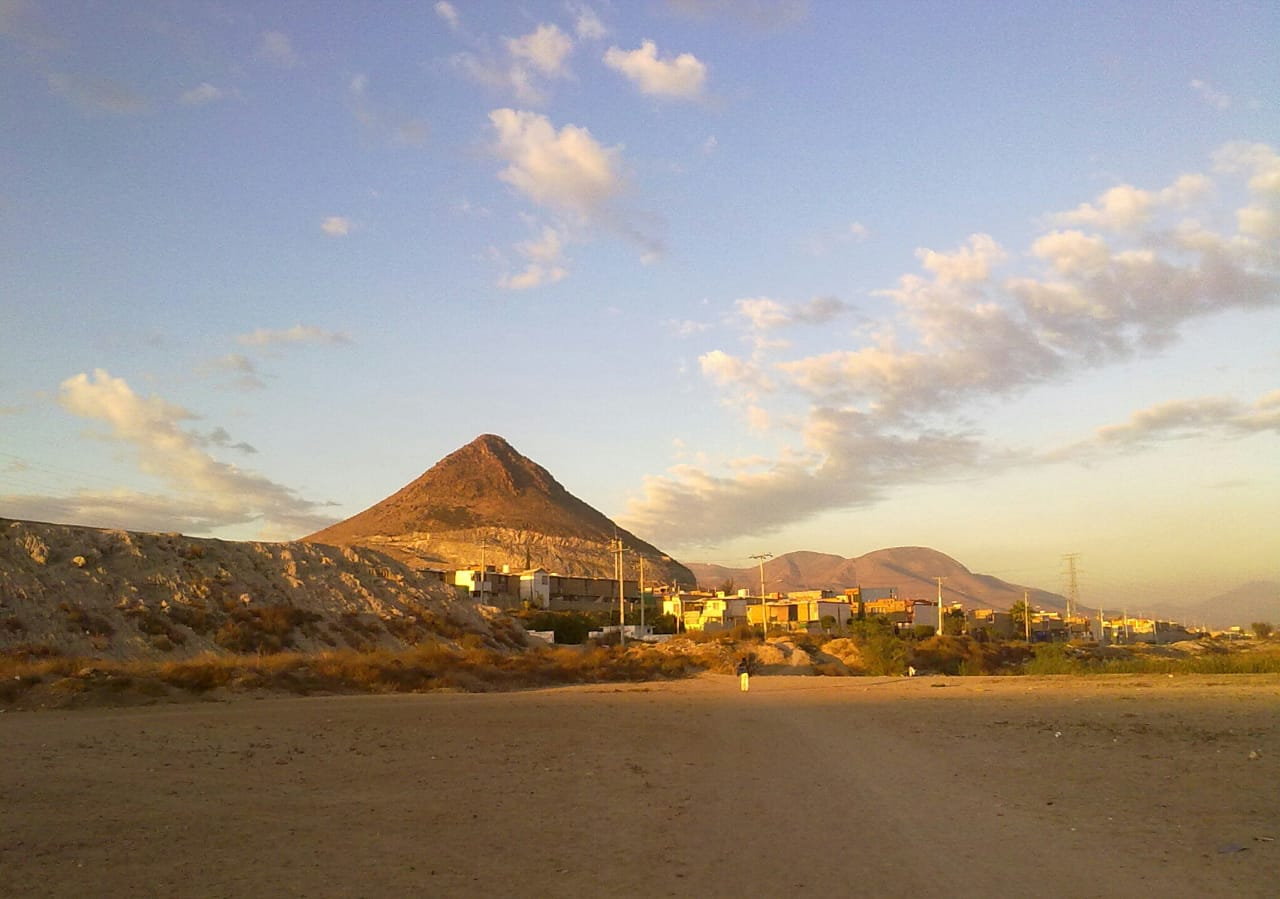
Cerro de Las Abejas.

The land on which San Diego–Tijuana sits is due west of a major transform fault. The transform fault, known as the San Andreas Fault was created during the Cenozoic by the movements of the Pacific plate and the North American plate. The region experiences earthquakes and felt the shocks of the 2009 Gulf of California earthquake and 2010 Baja California earthquake.

The main mountain ranges of the Peninsular Ranges ridging eastern San Diego–Tijuana is Palomar Mountain, the Laguna Mountains, Sierra de Juárez, and the peaks of the Cuyamacas including Cuyamaca Peak. The highest points are located in the Lagunas at 6,378 feet (1,944 m) and in the Cuyumacas at 6,512 feet (1,985 m) while the highest is the peak of Hot Springs Mountain at 6,535 feet (1,992 m). These mountain ranges constitute part of the Salinian Block, a largely granitic terrane dating back to the Mesozoic era and thus explaining the abundance of such stone throughout the region. Once part of the North American Plate, the Salinian block broke off due to the formation of the San Andreas Fault and rift resulting in the Gulf of California and its extension of the Salton Trough.

The faults nearest the urban area are the Elsinore and Laguna Salada faults, both secondary to the San Andreas fault.

=== Major coastal water bodies ===
The region is set with many natural coastal harbors, estuaries, inlets, lagoons, and bays. These included the major water bodies known as:

- Buena Vista Lagoon
- Agua Hedionda Lagoon
- Batiquitos Lagoon
- San Elijo Lagoon
- Mission Bay
- San Diego Bay
- Tijuana River Estuary

== Populace ==
Historical population
Census	Pop.	Note	%±
1990	3,245,397		—
2000	4,129,433		27.2%
2010	5,105,769		23.6%
historical data source:

The populace of the San Diego–Tijuana is cosmopolitan in that many cultures and ethnic groups are present. A large transitory population exists due to Tijuana's border proximity to the United States. This location draws many Latin Americans, including Argentines, Cubans, Guatemalans, and Andean nationalities, as well as Chinese, Korean, and Japanese people; Italian, French, Spanish and Lebanese also reside in the region. With a population of approximately five million people, the San Diego–Tijuana metropolitan area accounts for 40% of the United States – Mexico border population. The metropolitan area experiences the largest rates of growth in an urban area that stretches from Los Angeles to Tijuana. An analysis of age groups in the region found a relatively older population lives on the San Diegan side of the border while a relatively younger population the Tijuana side. The Tijuana region also maintains a population largely composed of people born outside of Baja California.

=== Cities ===
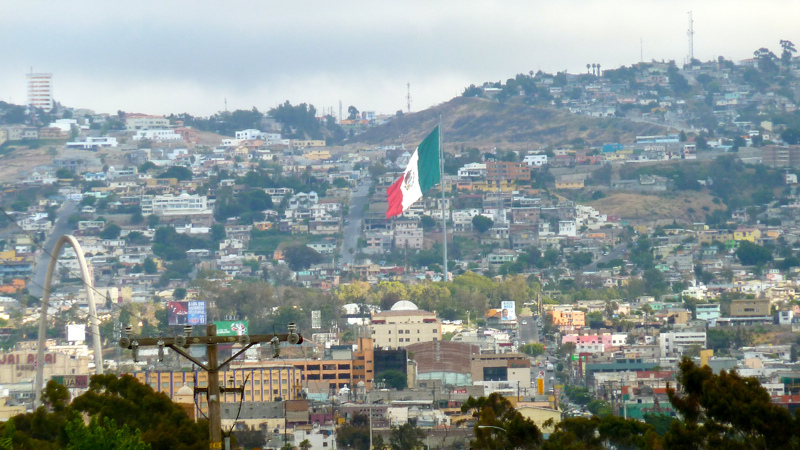
Tijuana, the largest city in the region

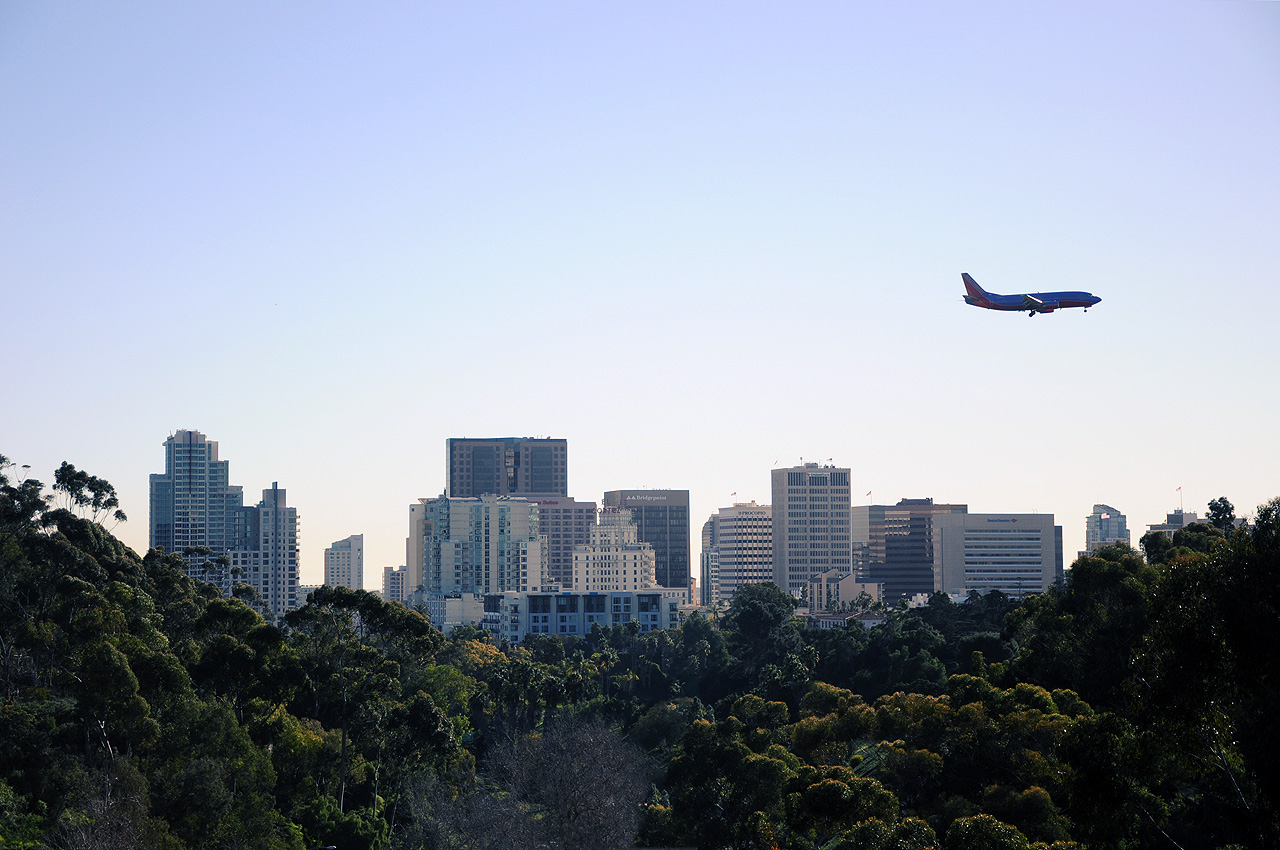
San Diego from Balboa Park, the second largest city in the region

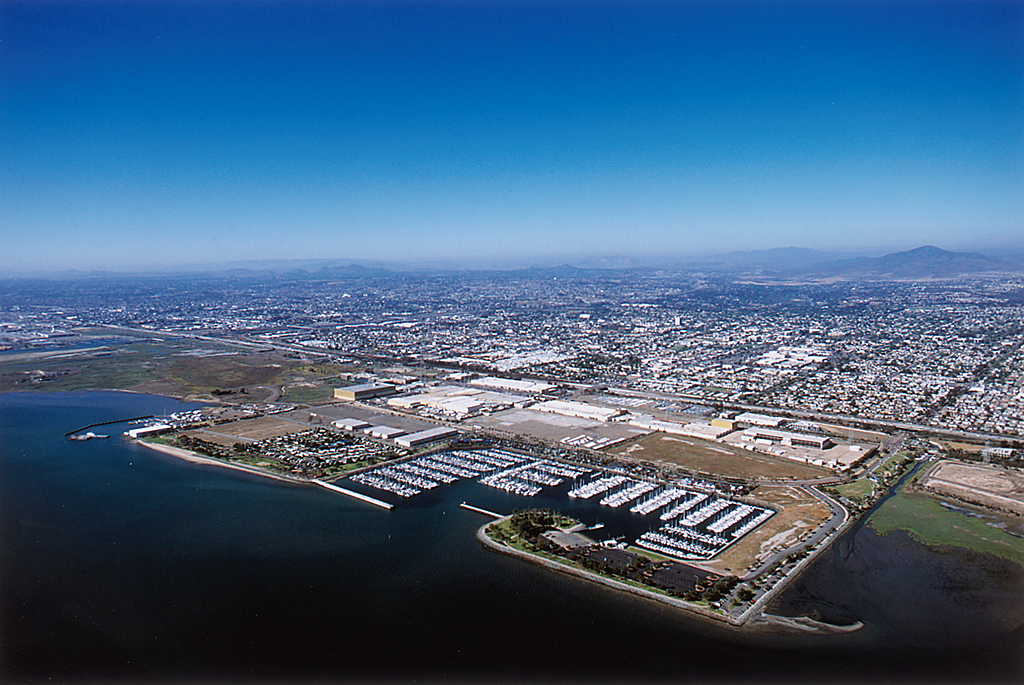
Chula Vista Bayfront of Chula Vista, 3rd largest city in the region

Oceanside Pier of Oceanside, 4th largest city in the region

San Diego and Tijuana

San Diego is located at 32°42′N 117°09′W, just north of Tijuana. The city is divided into eight districts by the municipal government of the City of San Diego in accordance with policing and community service areas. The city lies south of North County, and west of East County, while also being north of parts of South Bay. Though the city boundaries grace Tijuana's, Centre City lies approximately 18 miles (29 km) north of Tijuana. San Diego has deep canyons separating its mesas, creating small pockets of natural parkland scattered throughout the city. This makes San Diego a hilly city. The Coronado and Point Loma peninsulas separate San Diego Bay from the ocean.

Tijuana is located at 32°31′N 117°01′W, just south of San Diego. The city is divided into nine administrative boroughs, which are in turn divided into neighborhoods. These boroughs offer administrative services such as urban planning, civil registry, inspection, verification, public works and community development, served by a delegate. As Tijuana ranks higher in the Mexican urban hierarchy than San Diego does in the American urban hierarchy, Tijuana contains many foreign consulates including those of China, Korea, Finland, the United States, Germany, Spain, Honduras, France, Austria, Gambia, the United Kingdom, Italy, Norway, Sweden, Israel, Canada, and the Czech Republic. Tijuana does not receive competition from a larger urban center as San Diego does from Los Angeles. However, with Mexicali growing rapidly, a possible canal project planned and Silicon Border development under way, Tijuana will soon face similar competition.

Population figures for California cities are from 2010 U.S. Census data. Population figures for Baja California cities are from 2010 INEG census data.

Major cities – 100,000+ inhabitants

- Tijuana – 1,810,645
- San Diego – 1,386,932
- Chula Vista – 275,487
- Oceanside – 174,068
- Escondido – 151,038
- Carlsbad – 114,746
- El Cajon – 106,215

Other cities – 40,000+ inhabitants

- Vista – 98,381
- San Marcos – 94,833
- Rosarito Beach – 90,022
- Tecate – 64,764
- Encinitas – 62,007
- La Mesa – 61,121
- Santee – 60,037
- National City – 56,173
- Poway – 48,481

=== Mexico – United States border ===
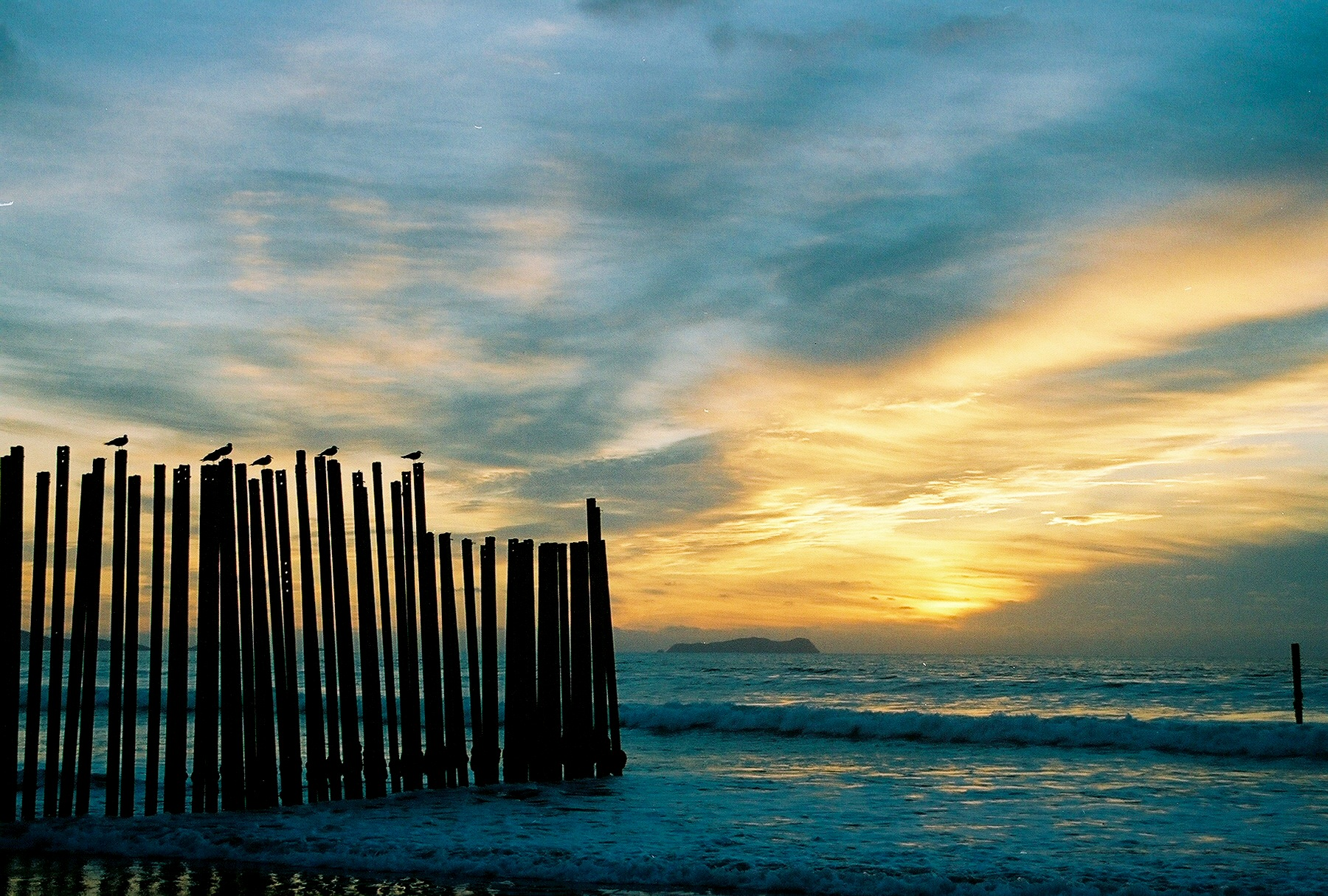
Beach at Border State Park; San Diego is on the right while Tijuana is on the left.

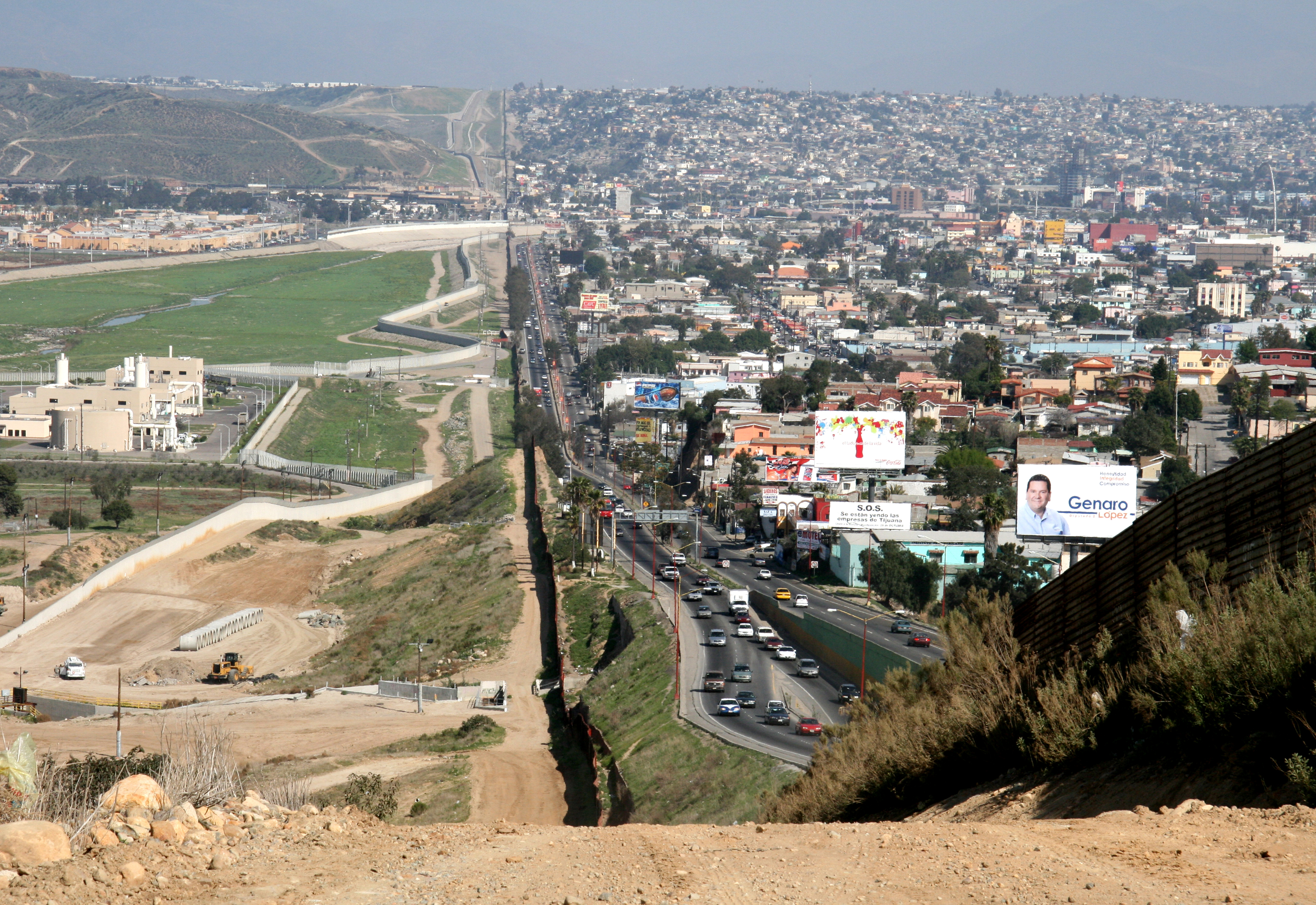
Border fence between Tijuana (right) and San Diego's border patrol offices (left)

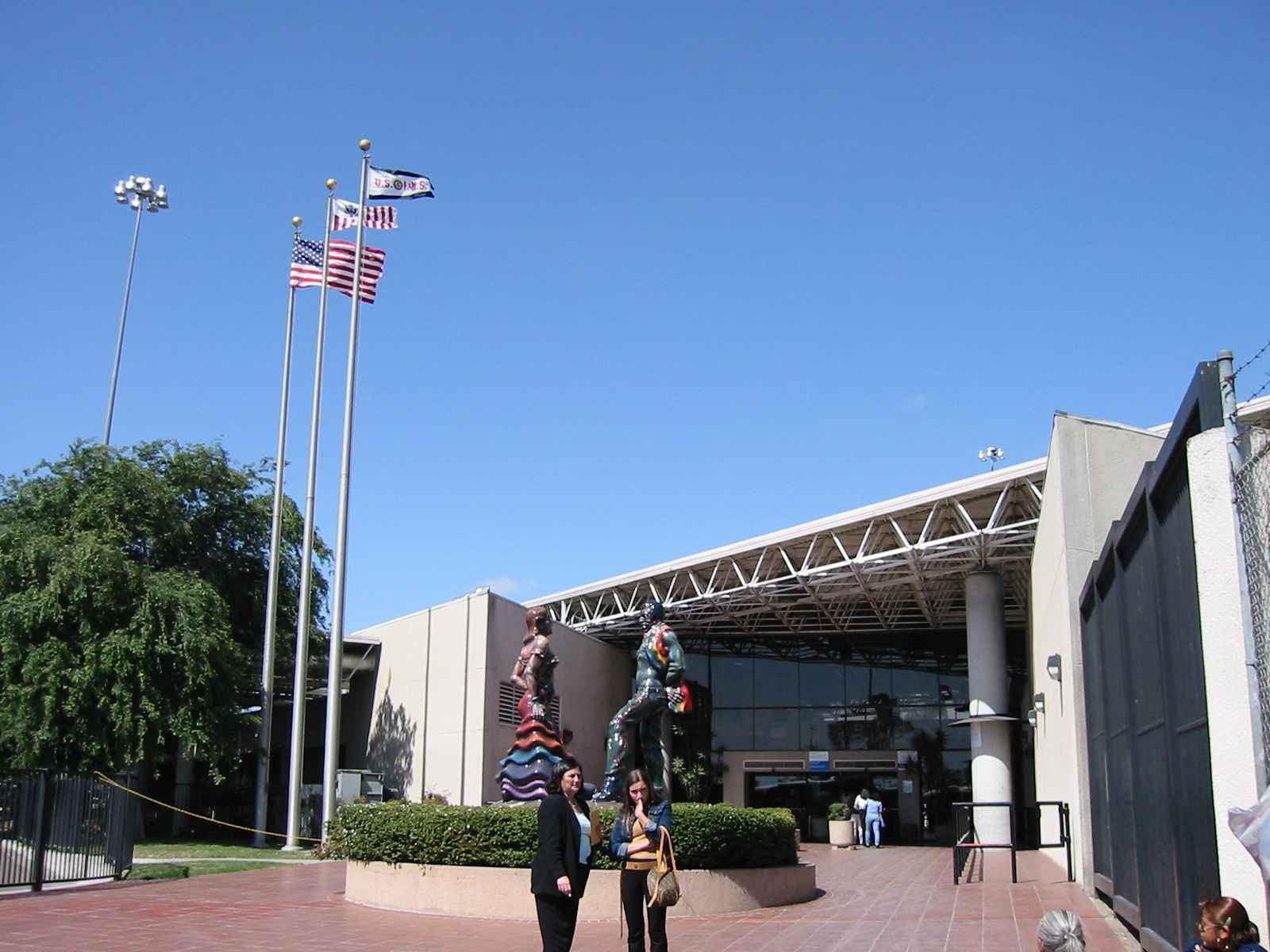
Otay Mesa Port of Entry pedestrian facility

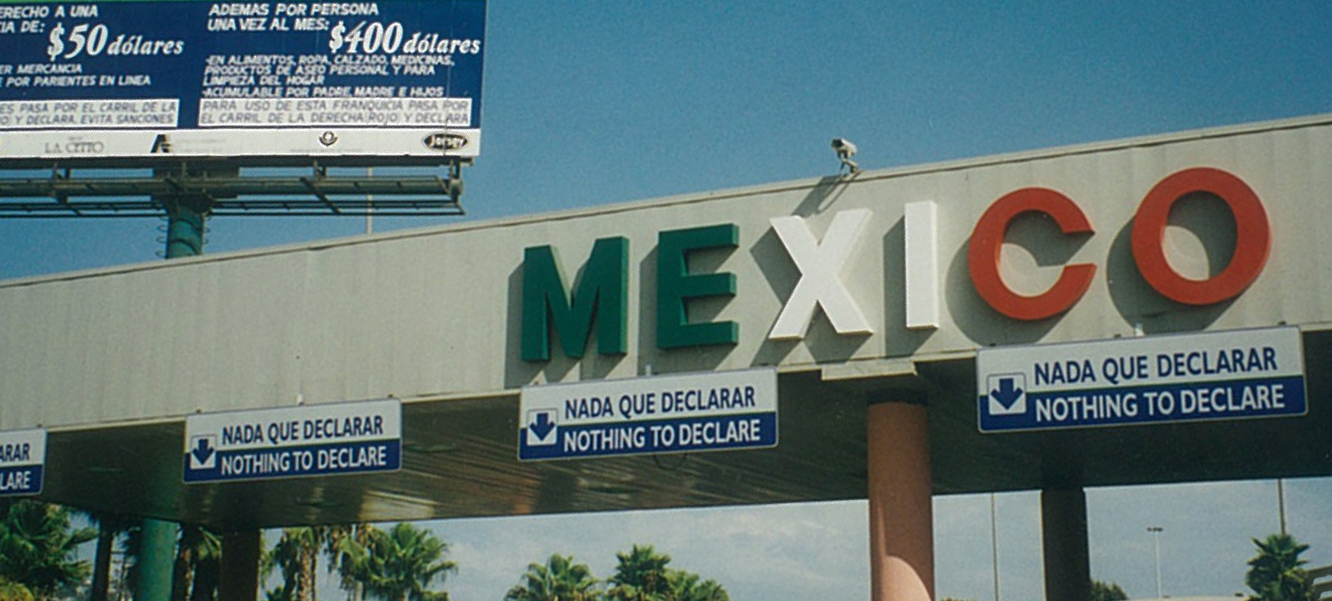
US-Mexico border crossing from the American side.

The international border between the United States and Mexico runs from San Diego–Tijuana eastward towards the Gulf of Mexico. The Pacific Ocean terminus of the border was defined as a line passing from the confluence of the Colorado and Gila rivers (now the southeastern corner of the U.S. State of California) to the Pacific Ocean such that it would pass one Spanish league south of the southern end of San Diego Bay. This ensured that the United States received the natural harbor at San Diego.

There are three existing border crossings in San Diego–Tijuana, with two more planned. San Ysidro/El Chaparral is the busiest border crossing in the world; In 2019 alone, more than 77.2 million people entered the U.S. through this port. There are maximum 30 vehicle border crossing lanes at the San Ysidro Port of Entry into the United States and 6 or 8 lanes into Mexico from San Ysidro. The San Diego/Tijuana border is also a major point of entry for trafficking, where 50 brothels of trafficked Mexican girls exist in San Diego County.

The majority of cross-border trips into the United States are those made by commuters into the Greater San Diego area and Southern California as a whole. Traffic to Tijuana tends to be for entertainment or affordable goods and services.

The San Ysidro port of entry is the main border crossing for non-commercial traffic. Crossing times are notoriously slow at San Ysidro, particularly for those entering the U.S. in cars. Given delays frequently experienced upon entry to Mexico, many cross-border travelers choose to cross on foot. Infrastructure on both sides of the border delivers travelers and commuters to border crossings via respective public transportation systems of which includes the San Diego Trolley Blue Line that runs from downtown San Diego to the border crossing.

== Economy ==
Leading industries in San Diego–Tijuana are trade, services, electronics, tourism, life sciences, high-tech and defense sectors. In 2002 San Diego and Tijuana had a gross regional product of $136.3 Billion; and in 2007 this figure increased to $176 Billion. The greater San Diego area has a knowledge-based economy that is only growing; Tijuana's sub-metropolitan region is reliant on a diversified manufacturing sector. Leading private employers to the metropolitan region are Qualcomm, SAIC, Sempra Energy, Sony, Kyocera, Pfizer Global Research & Development, Callaway Golf, Sharp HealthCare, Scripps Health, Sanyo, Hitachi, Panasonic Corporation, Samsung, Hyundai, Mattel, Honeywell, Pioneer Corporation, Maxell, Douglas Furniture, and International Rectifier.

On the 2020 Globalization and World Cities classification, San Diego was rated as Beta - level global city up from Gamma level, while Tijuana was rated as a high sufficiency city.

=== Maritime ===
The economy of the urban area is influenced by the Port of San Diego which gives the region a strong maritime sector; the conurbation is the location of the only major submarine and shipbuilding yards on the West Coast and of the largest naval fleet in the world. The cruise ship industry, which is the second largest in the California-Baja California region, generates an estimated $2 million annually from the purchase of food, fuel, supplies, and maintenance services. In California alone, the port is the fastest-growing port in terms of cruise ship dockings and the second largest behind the Port of Los Angeles.

=== Manufacturing ===
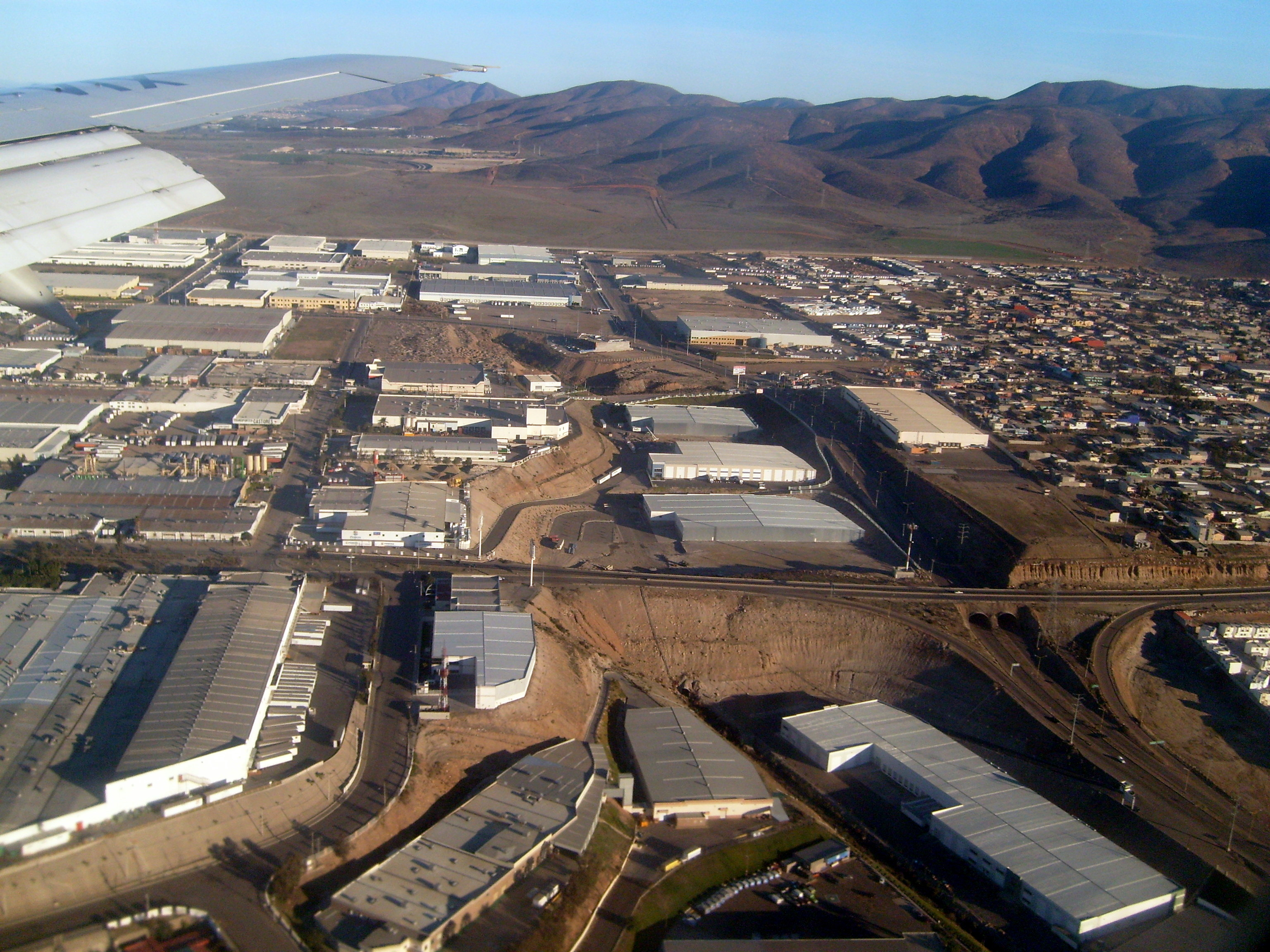
An industrial park in Tijuana's outskirts

Manufacturing accounts for a large part of the regional economy more-so observed in Tijuana. The focus of manufacturing in the region is on soft and hard technological products. In metropolitan Tijuana, manufacturing has historically allotted for a large sector of the economy and San Diego County's economy has increasingly focused on manufacturing which 2002 allotted for $25 billion of the county's economic income. The 2000s decade saw Tijuana overtake the Twin Cities as medical device manufacture capital of North America. The amount of diverse and numerous manufacture companies in the area have made the metropolitan region one of the world's largest concentrated manufacturing areas.

=== Tech ===
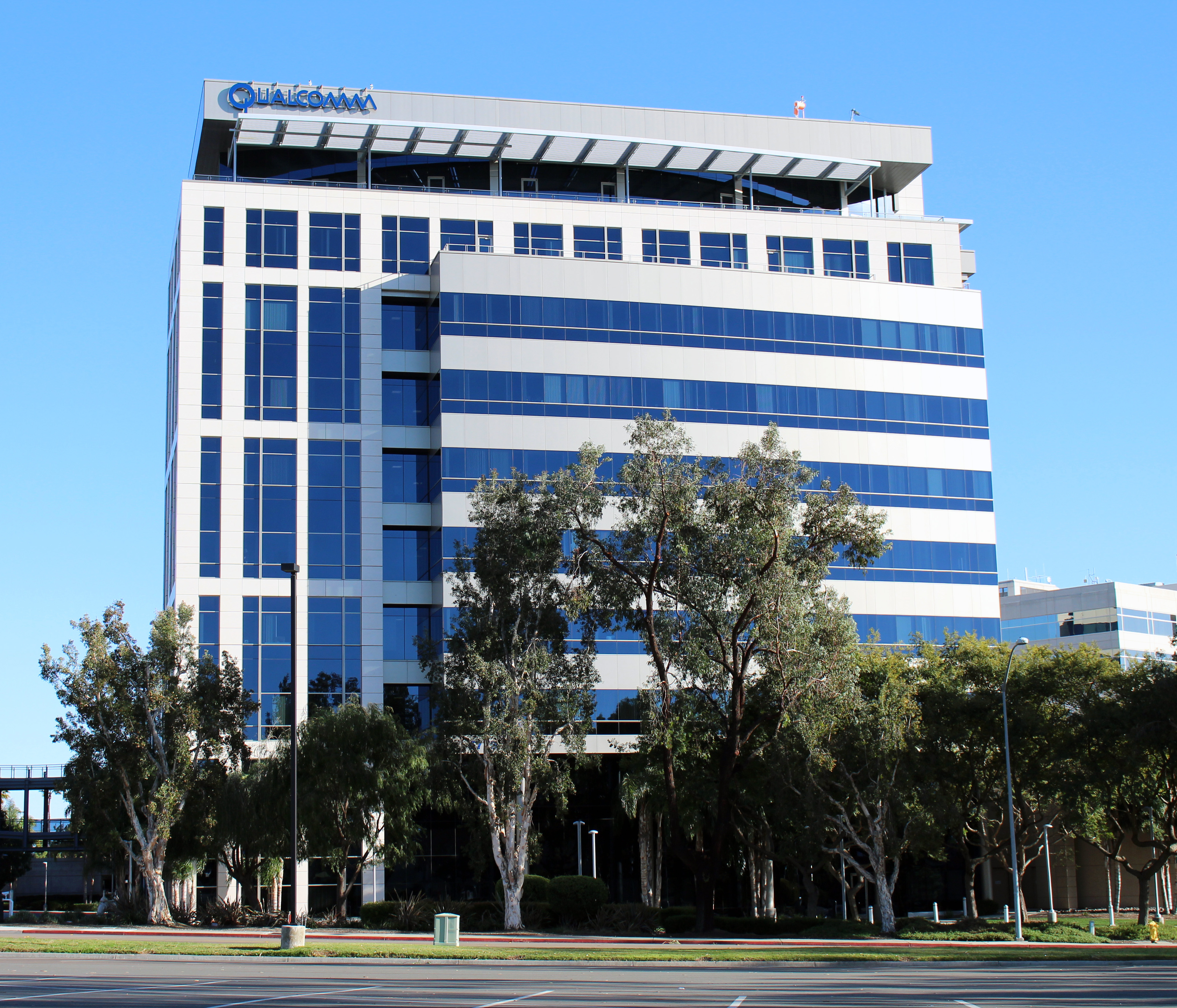
Qualcomm Corporate Headquarters

Engineers and entrepreneurs in the entirety of the border region are making growth of the economic industry.

Several areas of San Diego are home to offices and research facilities for numerous biotechnology companies and pharmaceutical companies. Among American metropolitan areas, metropolitan San Diego is the third largest concentrated area of high technology and biotechnology businesses. The presence of the University of California, San Diego and other research institutions helped fuel biotechnology growth. In June 2004, San Diego was ranked the top biotech cluster in the U.S. by the Milken Institute. San Diego is home to companies that develop wireless cellular technology. Qualcomm Incorporated was founded and is headquartered in San Diego; Qualcomm is the largest private-sector technology employer (excluding hospitals) in San Diego County. Due to San Diego's military influence, major national defense contractors, such as General Atomics and Science Applications International Corporation (SAIC), are or have been headquartered in San Diego.

=== Major business districts ===
Business districts include the Columbia district of downtown San Diego, downtown Tijuana, Rancho Bernardo, Carmel Valley, Mission Valley, Sorrento Mesa, and University City neighborhoods of San Diego. Notability among business districts extends to Rancho Bernardo, the site of Sony US corporate headquarters.

Business districts within San Diego–Tijuana
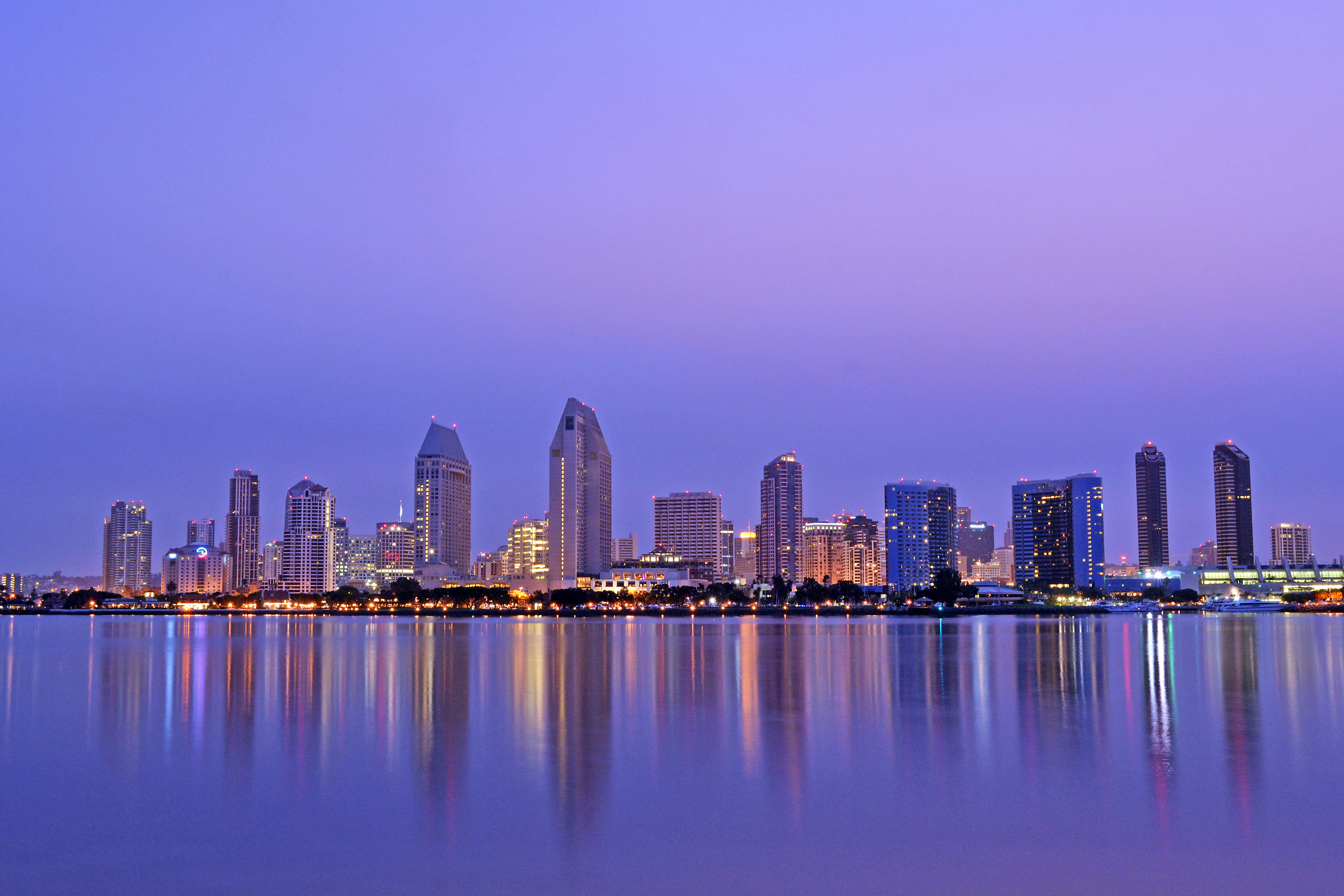
Centre City, San Diego's central business district

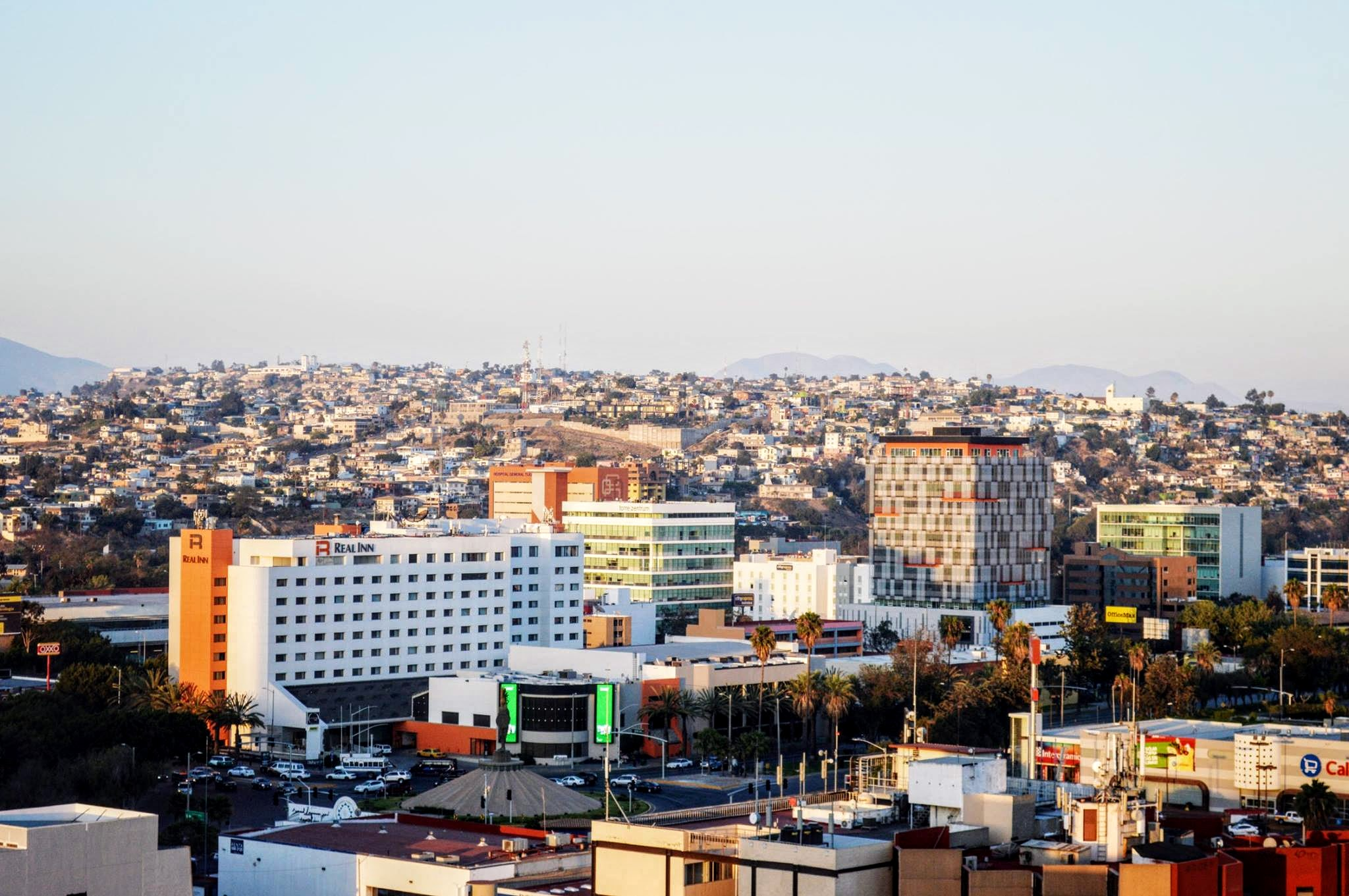
Río Zone, Tijuana's central business district

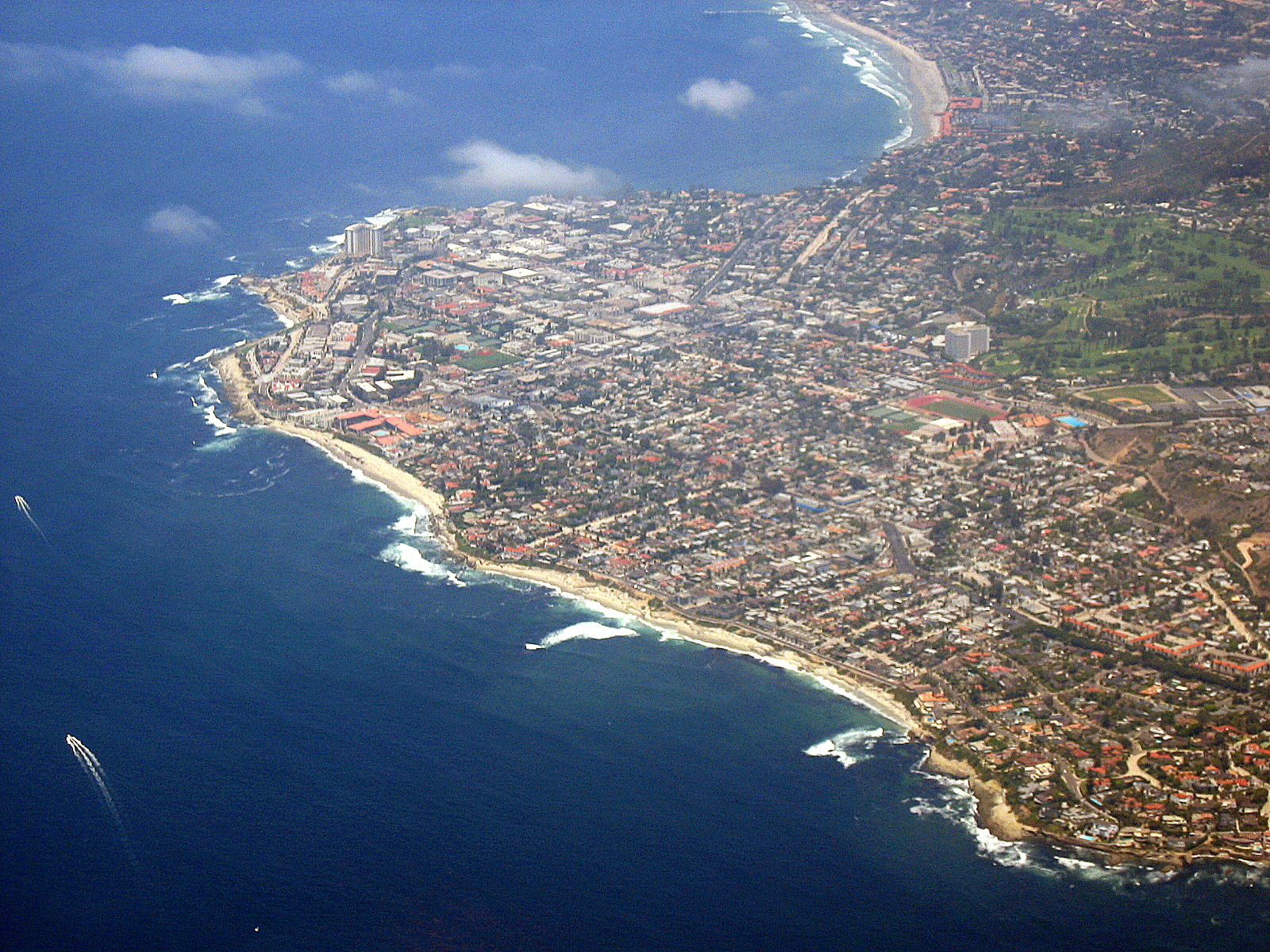
Village of La Jolla, the La Jolla business district

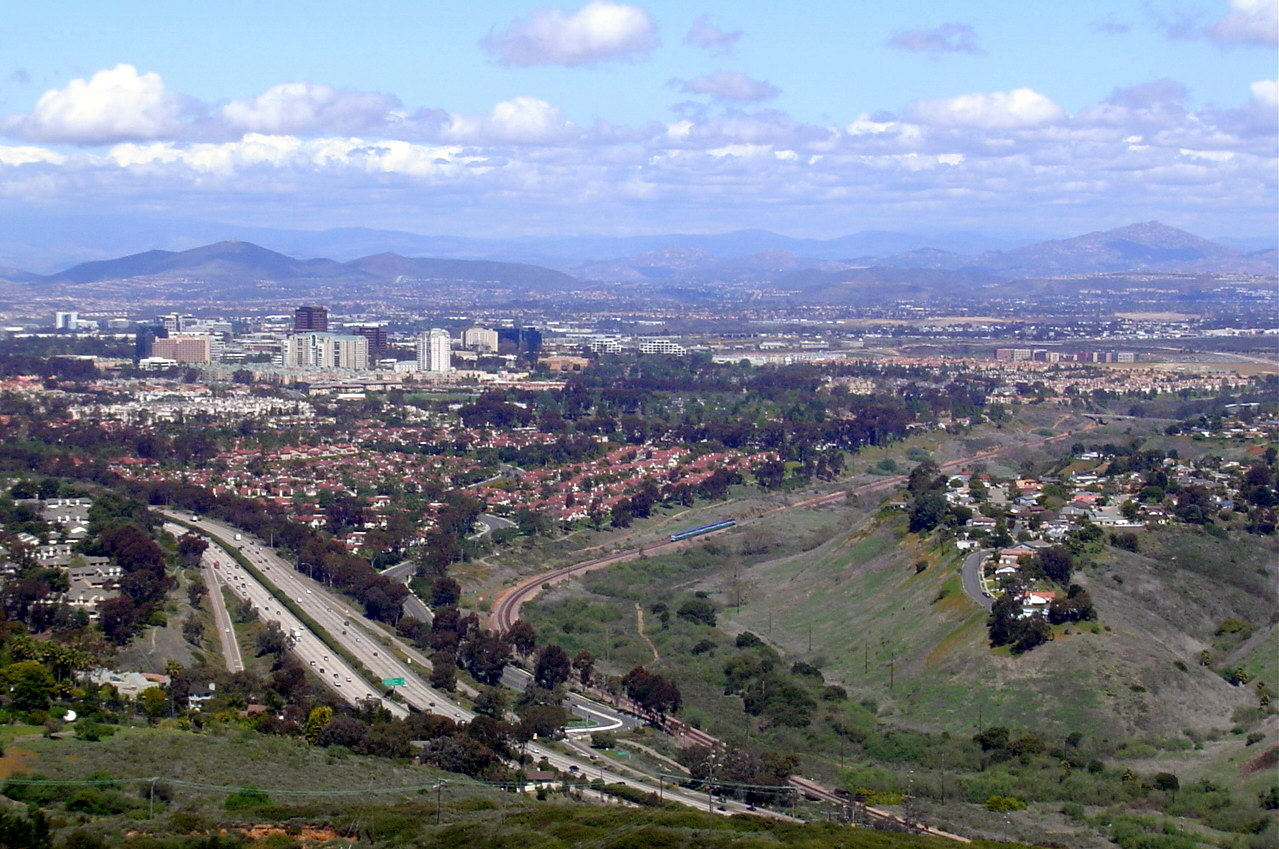
University City, a North County business district

=== Tourism ===
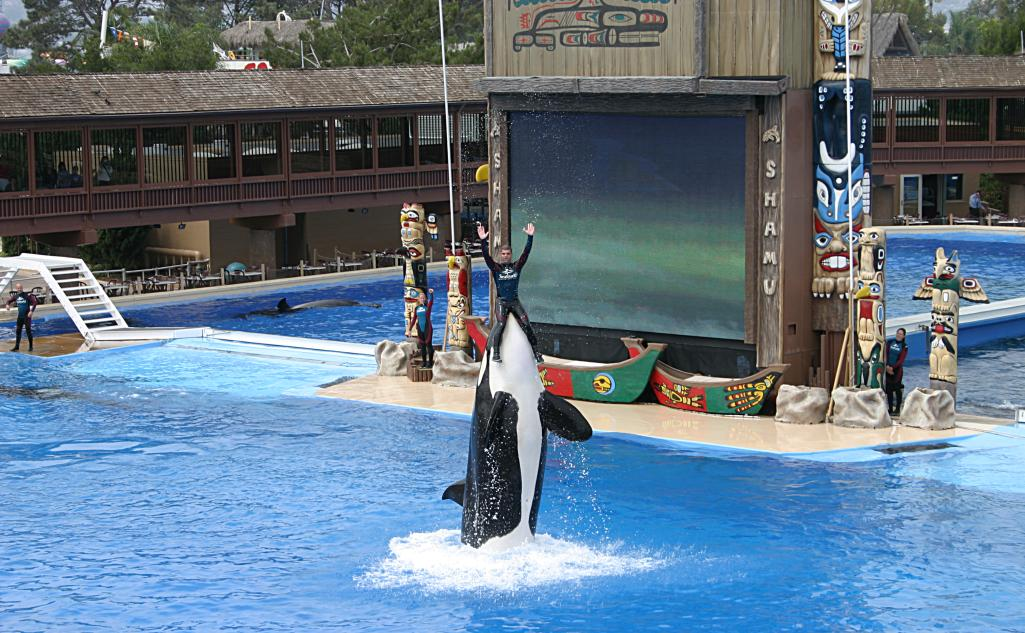
Kasatka (Shamu) performing at SeaWorld San Diego

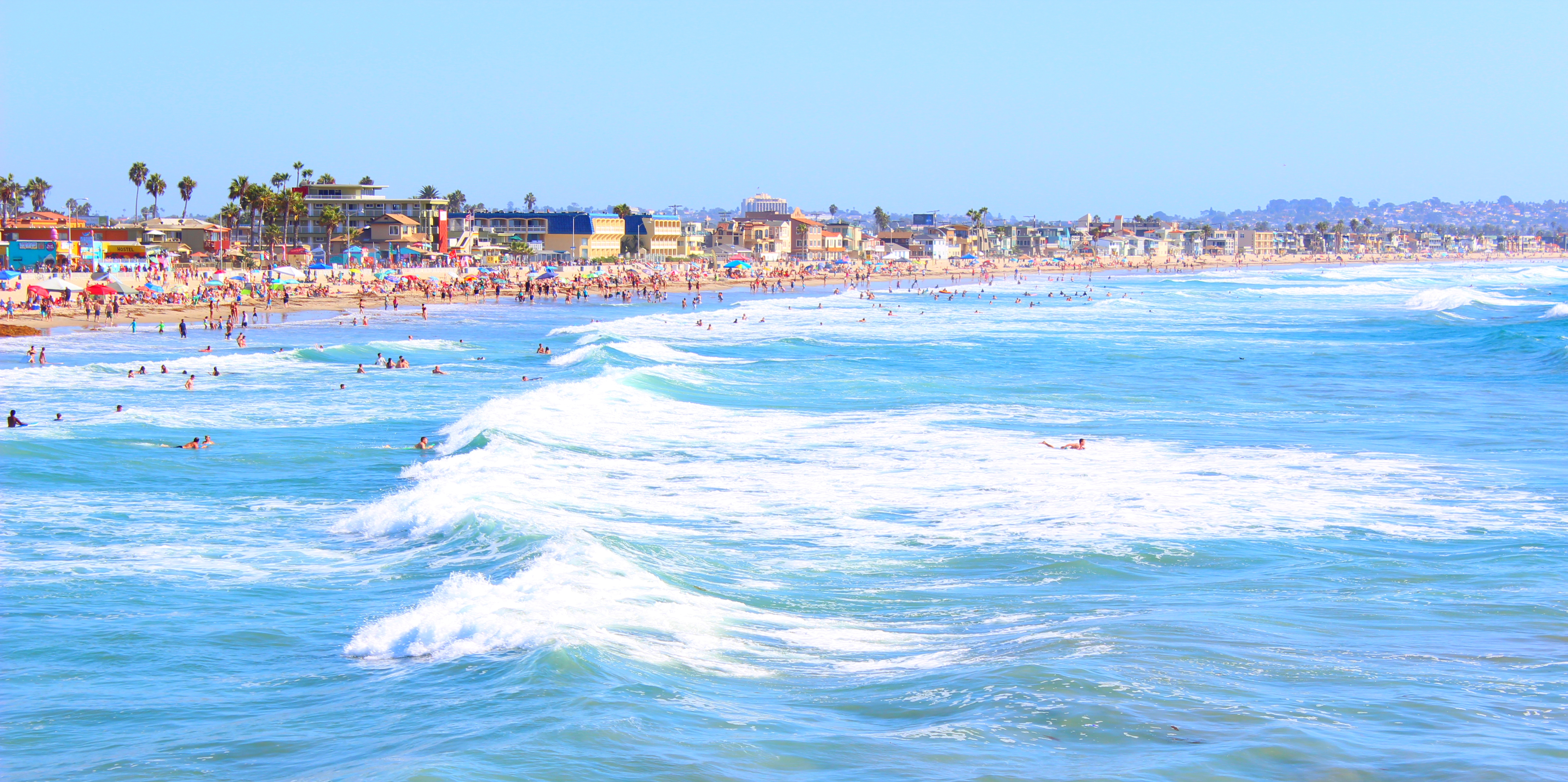
Pacific Beach, a popular destination for beachgoers

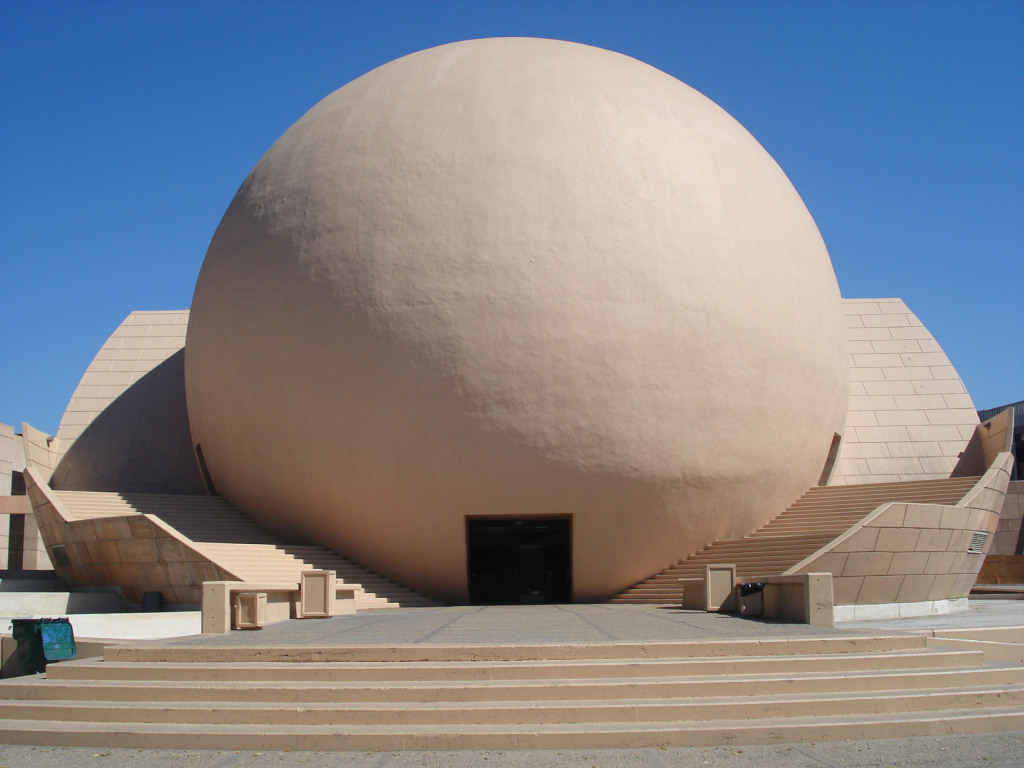
Tijuana's Cultural Center's OMNIMAX theater.

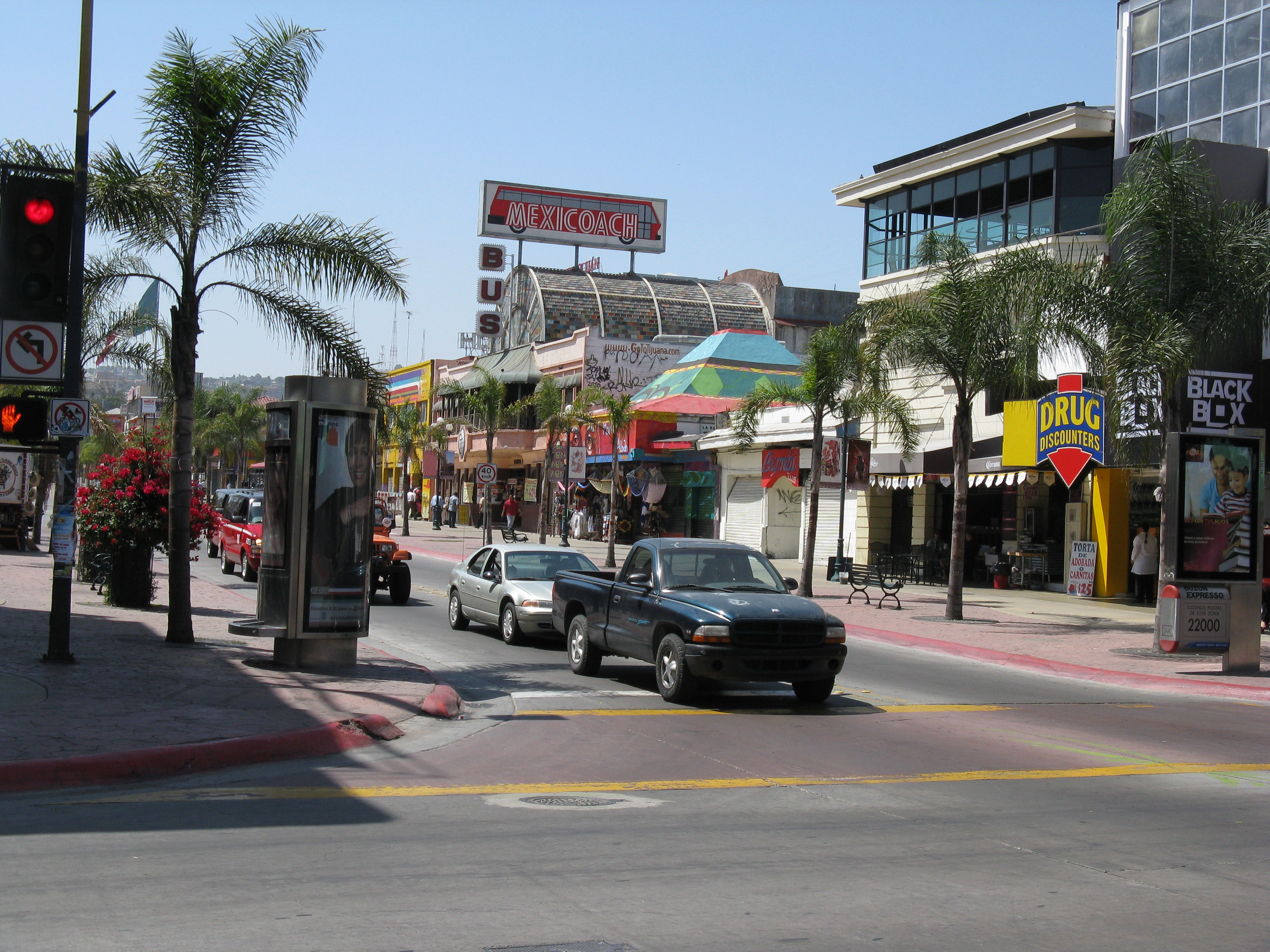
Avenida Revolución, one of Tijuana's prime entertainment districts. A

Tourism is a major industry of the region, owing much to the area's mild Mediterranean climate. Tijuana alone is the most visited city in the Western Hemisphere, second only to New York City. 50,000,000 people visit the city each year and about 300,000 visitors cross by foot or car from the San Ysidro point of entry to Tijuana every day. The San Diego Zoo, SeaWorld, Avenida Revolución, Rosarito, the area's beaches, and the Farmers Insurance Open are just some of the major tourist destinations in the conurbation. Mexico's drinking age of 18 and legal and regulated prostitution make Tijuana a common weekend destination for many young Southern Californians and sex tourists.

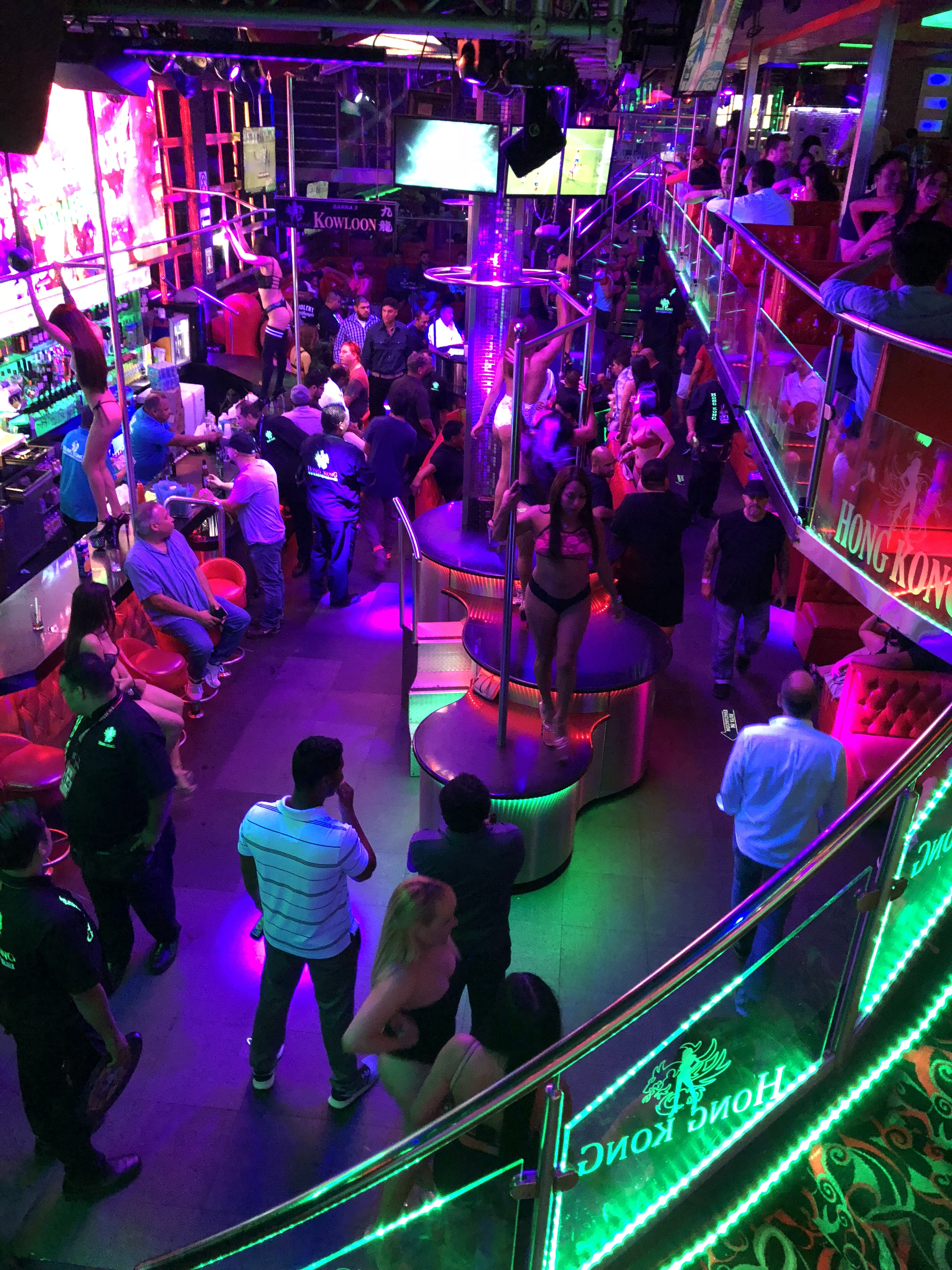
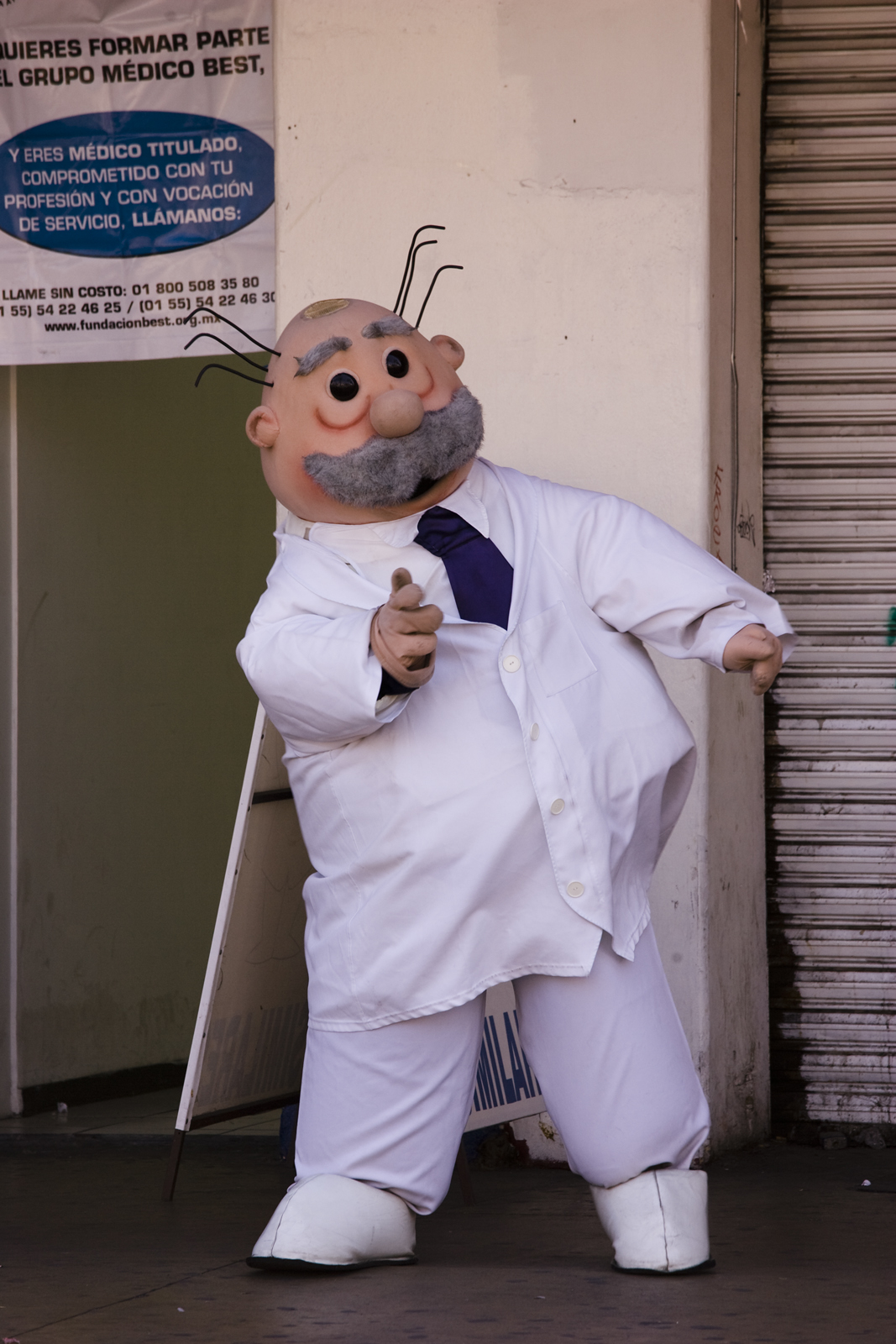
Tijuana is a destination for sex tourism and medical tourism. A gentlemen's club (left) and the Dr. Simi mascot in front of a medical clinic (right).

Many large luxury hotels line San Diego Bay and the coast of Playas de Tijuana. The bay and its marinas are surrounded by more than fifteen hotels while historic buildings such as Hotel del Coronado and Rosarito Beach Hotel lie on the Coronado peninsula and Rosarito coast. In Playas, Baja Mar, and Baja Malibu, several luxury hotels and condominiums can be found lining the coast in customary beach resort fashion, including Park Towers and AQUA condominiums.

=== Cross-border Trade & NAFTA ===
The North American Free Trade Agreement has a great influence on transborder trade in the San Diego–Tijuana economy. Of all the goods exchanged to the north 20% transported are destined for San Diego, 60% are destined for other California counties, and the remaining 20% are destined to other American states. The metropolitan economy has become increasingly integrated as the NAFTA process has reduced trade and investment barriers which facilitates the trade and extensive sales services via cross-border exchange. San Diego–Tijuana is a critical commercial link to the United States. In Tijuana, companies that have established assembly plants in industrial parks referred to as maquiladoras include Sony, Toyota, Samsung, Kodak, Matsushita/Panasonic, Nabisco, Philips, Pioneer, Plantronics, Pall Corporation, Tara Labs, and Sanyo, while San Diego supports the expansion of its own industrial parks in Otay Mesa. Additionally some of these companies, such as Samsung, source the development of items locally.

Even prior to the implementation of NAFTA, Tijuana was home to many businesses selling products and services at a lower rate than in the United States. Today businesses such as auto detailing, medical services, dentistry and plastic surgery are heavily marketed and located near Tijuana's border with San Diego. In addition, there are high-tech firms and telemarketing companies, including Medtronic Inc., in the city. This influx of companies is drawing skilled people from the United States with technical trades and college degrees to Tijuana transforming the city economy into a knowledge-based one.

== Transportation ==
=== Public transportation ===
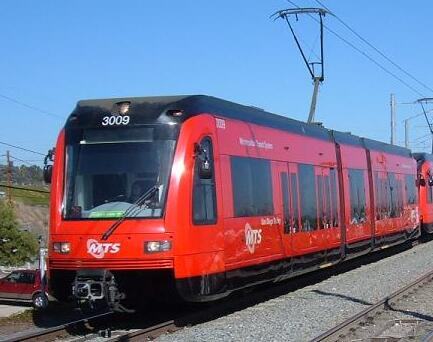
The San Diego Trolley

San Diego's primary light rail network is the San Diego Trolley, operated by the San Diego Metropolitan Transit System. The trolley system consist of five lines: the Blue Line which runs from San Ysidro Transit Center just north of the border to UTC Transit Center, the Orange Line which runs from Courthouse station to Santee station, the Green Line which runs from 12th & Imperial Transit Center to Santee station through Mission Valley, the Copper Line which connects from El Cajon Transit Center to Santee station, and the Silver Line which is a heritage streetcar line that runs in a loop in downtown San Diego.

San Diego is served by the Pacific Surfliner, an Amtrak inter-city rail which terminates at Santa Fe Depot in downtown San Diego. San Diego is also served by COASTER, a commuter rail service that runs from downtown San Diego to Oceanside, operated by the North County Transit District. From Oceanside Transit Center, riders can either take the SPRINTER hybrid rail to Escondido, Metrolink's Orange County Line to downtown Los Angeles, or the Inland Empire–Orange County Line to downtown San Bernardino.

Plenty of free parking is available at Stadium station on days when Snapdragon Stadium is not hosting events, as well as several other stations throughout the system that have park and rides. All trolley stations also provide connection points to MTS bus services, as MTS has designed the trolley to be the backbone of the local public transit system.

In Tijuana there is currently no public rail system, although, there is a system of buses that operate in the area. However, it was reported by The San Diego Union-Tribune that San Diego officials desired that the California High-Speed Rail be extended to Tijuana and South Bay in order to capitalize on the potential economic benefits. Additionally, there have been plans to extend the Blue Line into Tijuana proper.

=== Major highways ===
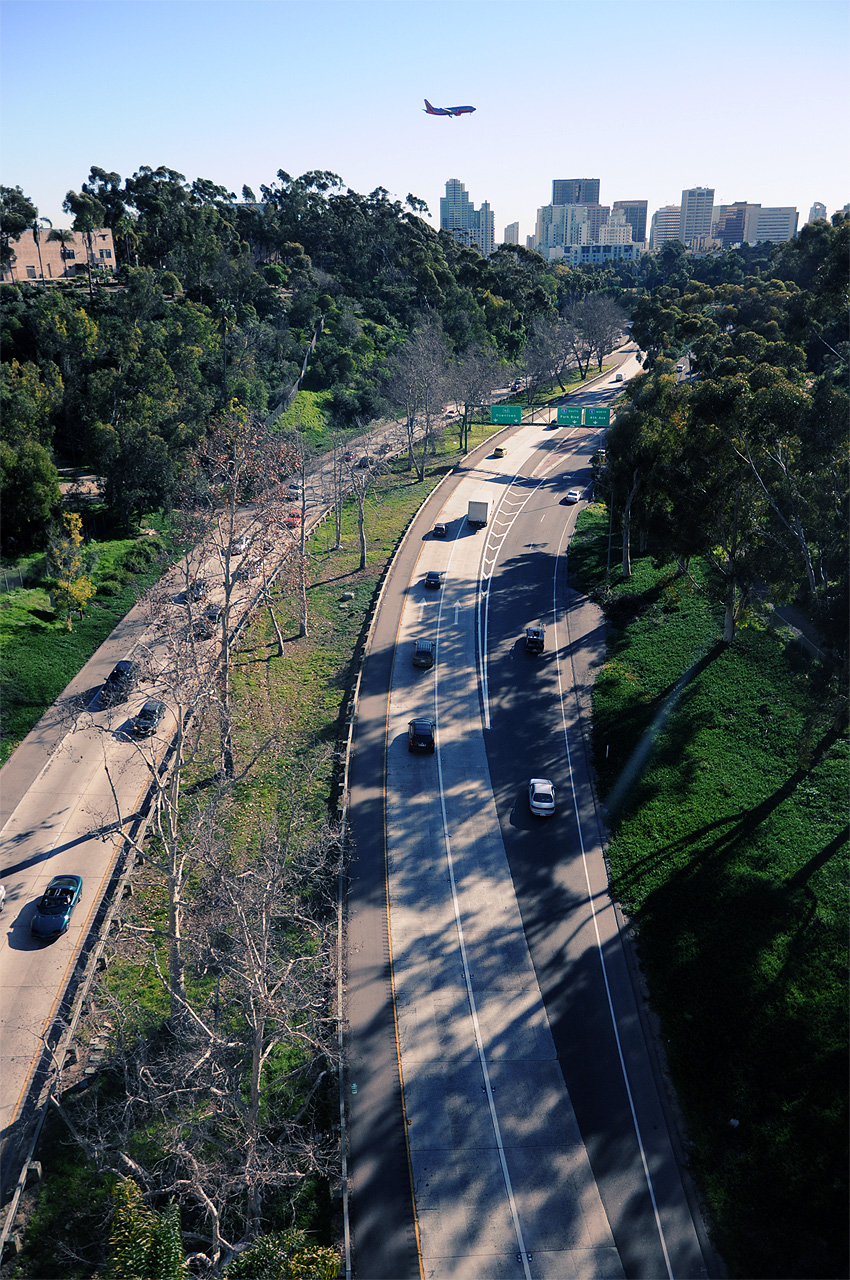
Cabrillo Freeway (SR 163) leading into Downtown San Diego

San Diego–Tijuana is at the junction of major interstates, state routes and federal highways. The region is at the terminus of ten major Interstates and Federal Highways. Radiating to the east and south are connections to the Imperial Valley, Mexicali Valley, and the Arizona Sun Corridor via Interstate 8, the Inland Empire, the Las Vegas metropolitan area, and Salt Lake City via Interstate 15; and to the Greater Ensenada area via Federal Highway 1D. To the north and west the area is connected to the Los Angeles metropolitan area, Northern California, and Cascadia via Interstate 5. Interstate 5 and Federal Highway 1 are critical highways for commercial and international trade due to their junction at the San Ysidro Port of Entry, linking major industrial regions along the British Columbia Coast, West Coast of the United States, and the Gold Coast of Baja California at the busiest port of entry in the world. The metropolitan area is linked by Federal Highway 2 and State Route 111 to Gulf of Mexico cities.

Within the metropolitan region, there are many transportation routes via highway. These included Interstate 805, connecting Tijuana to Del Mar. Many highways have a terminus in South Bay and run north and west towards other agglomerations such as the Inland Empire and Los Angeles metropolitan area. State Routes that link to these urban areas include State Route 79 and State Route 78. San Diego–Tijuana is linked to Ensenada by various ways as well; including Federal Highway 3, Federal Highway 1 and Federal Highway 1D, running from the border cities of Tijuana and Tecate to the Cinderella of the Pacific.

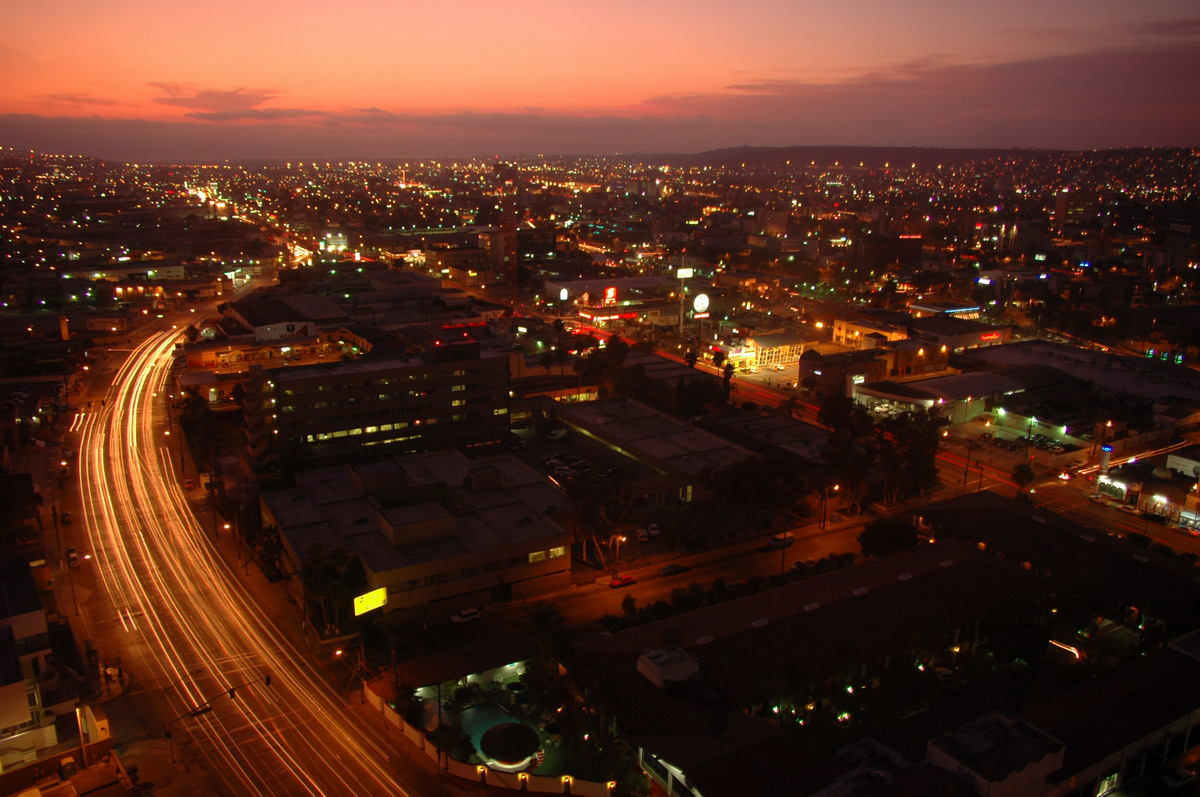
A Federal Highway in Tijuana's North

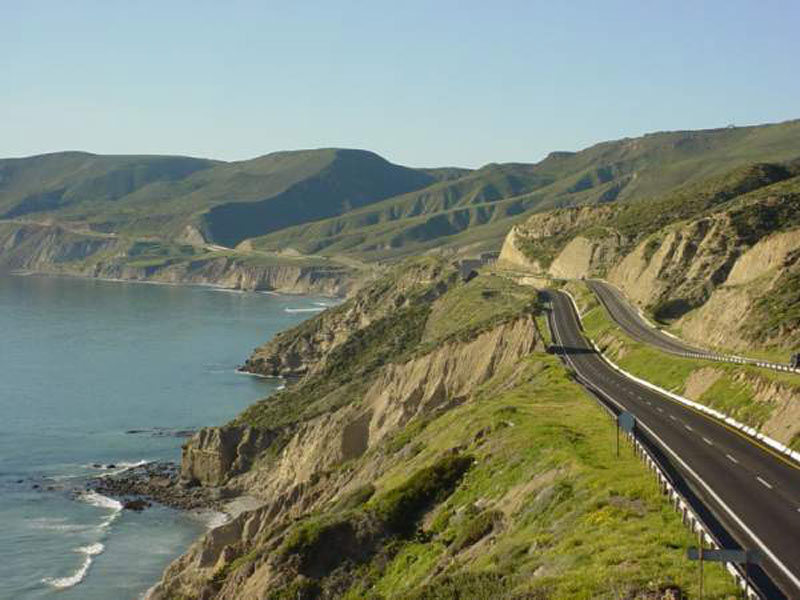
Highway that connects Tijuana and Ensenada, locally known as "La Escénica"

In addition to the extensive highway system, the cities and regions within San Diego–Tijuana are interconnected by many state routes as well. State Route 52 connects communities in northern San Diego, State Route 905 connects the Otay Mesa Port of Entry with South Bay cities, State Route 125 connects South Bay with East County, State Route 94 connects South Bay with the Mountain Empire, and State Route 78 connects North County Coastal with North County Inland, as well as to the mountain communities of the San Diego County Peninsular Ranges.

San Diego has a major network of roads, predominantly free Highways with several toll roads, and Interstates. Interstate 5 runs south from the Canadian-border city of Vancouver and terminates at the San Ysidro International border where it becomes Federal Highway 1. Another major freeway is Interstate 8 that runs west from the Arizona Sun Corridor at Casa Grande, Arizona, and terminates at Ocean Beach in San Diego. The roadway system in Tijuana is very low end compared to the quality of streets in the United States. The majority of the roads are in desperate need of repair with many newly constructed off ramps being set up in an impractical method often requiring sharp and hard turns. When it comes to long-distance travel through Baja California, many people use the toll roads that are well maintained and are at a standard comparable to that of U.S. roads.

=== Port ===
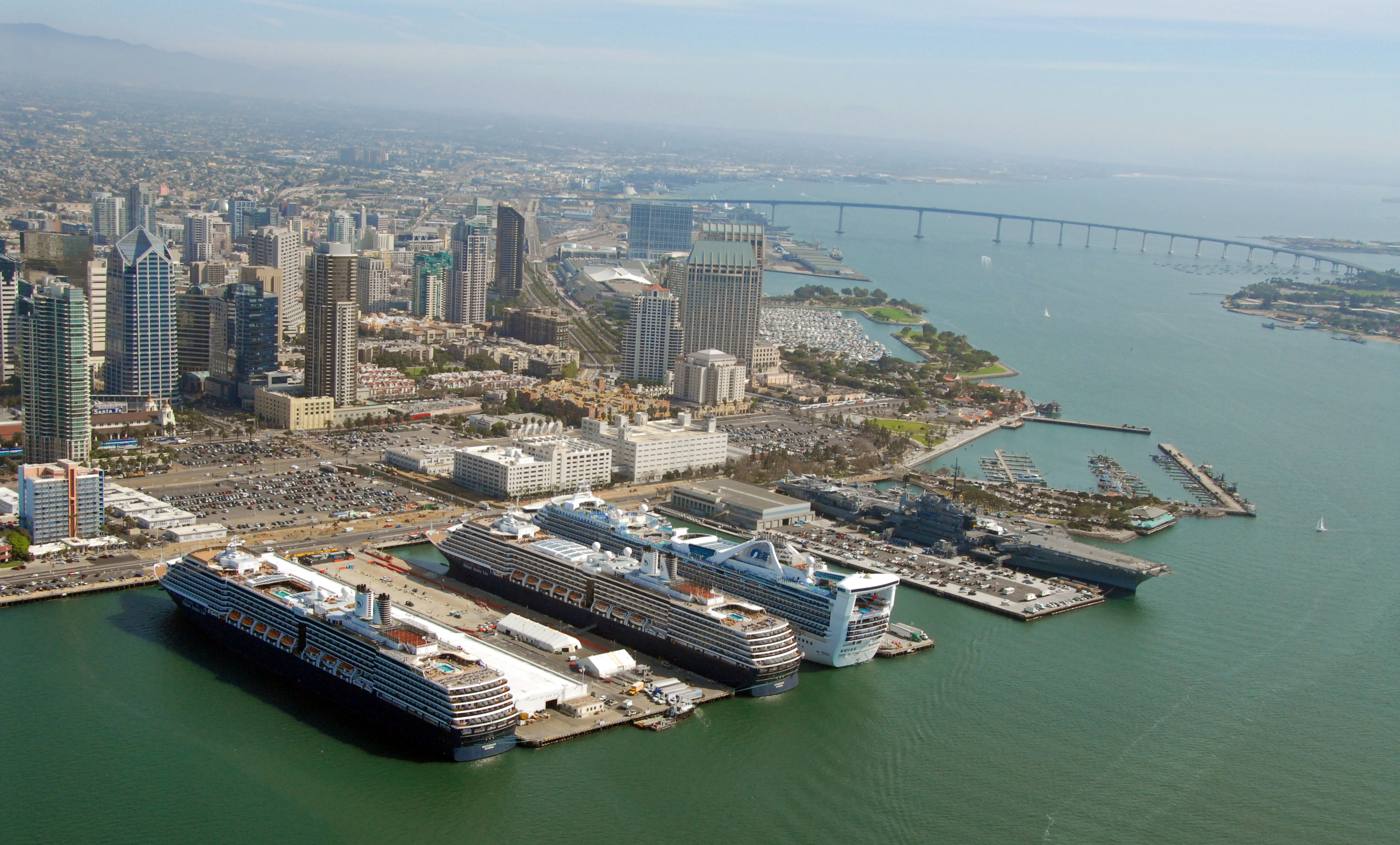
San Diego is a port of call for nine cruise lines

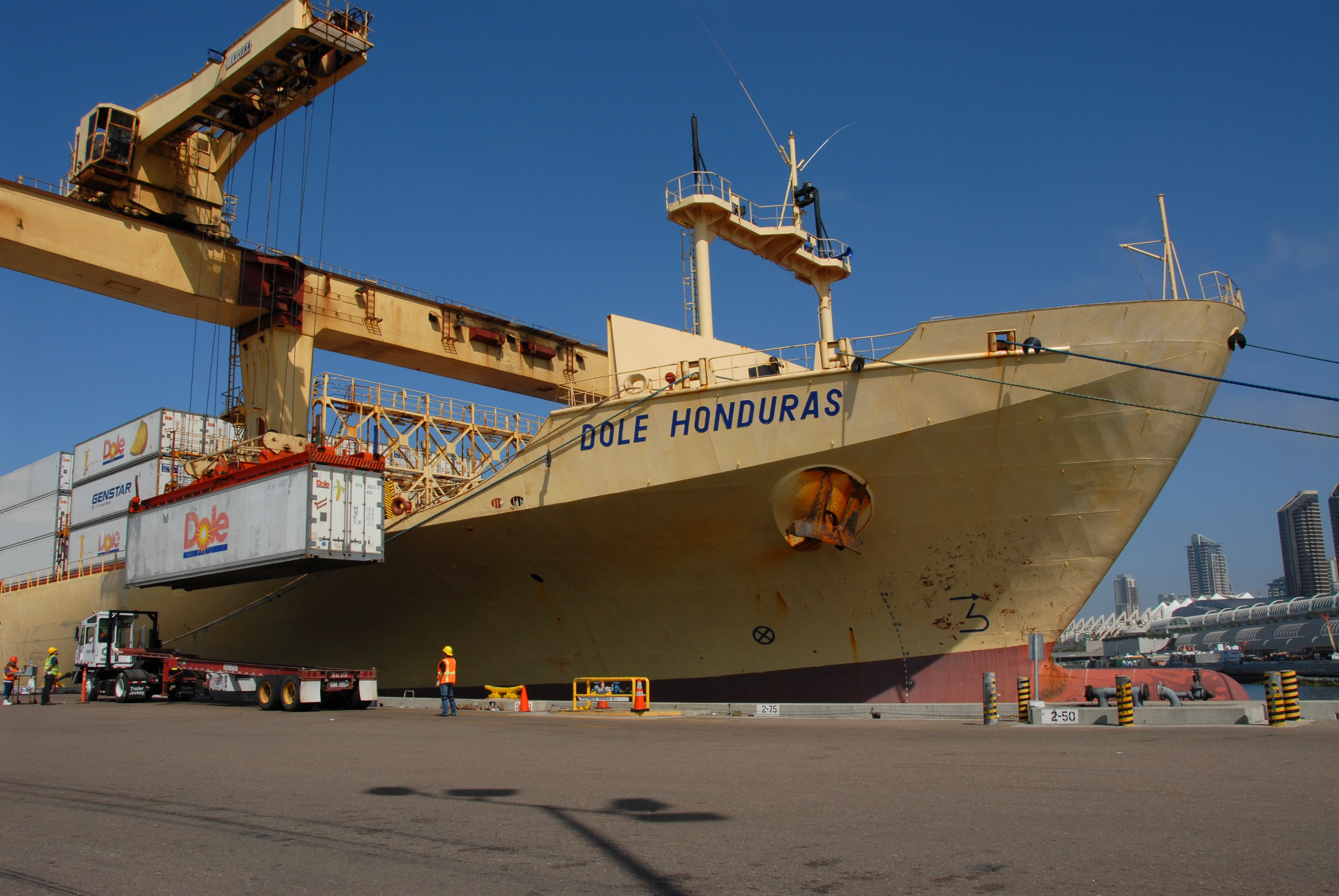
Dole Honduras at the Tenth Avenue Marine Terminal container port.

San Diego–Tijuana's only deepwater port is both a container port and cruise ship destination. The Port of San Diego has recreation terminals and docked ships at the Maritime Museum of San Diego, which is located at the Embarcadero. The port is serviced by nine cruise lines including Carnival Cruise Line and Royal Caribbean International. A new cruise terminal was recently constructed at the Port to compensate for the increased levels of maritime tourism.

Cargo and container terminals are located to the south of the Embarcadero where two marine cargo facilities are administered. The Port of San Diego was ranked by the United States' Bureau of Transportation Statistics as one of America's top 30 U.S. container ship ports in 2007. The port also serves as the primary port of entry for larger car corporations including Honda, Volkswagen, and Nissan into the United States of America. The Port of Ensenada also serves as a transport point where cruise ships arrive and depart from Southern Californian, European, and Central American ports. Cargo arriving at the Port of Ensenada is also transported to the metropolitan region via the Tijuana-Ensenada Freeway.

The Port of Punta Colonet is being planned as an alternative port to the West Coast ports of the United States and Canada; though the port is not without its negative environmental impacts. 150 miles (240 km) south of Tijuana, the port is intended to compete with the twin ports of Long Beach and Los Angeles, Once completed the port would serve as the primary dock for Asian vessels unloading shipping containers. and would have a 200-mile (320 km) rail line to San Diego–Tijuana.

=== Airports ===
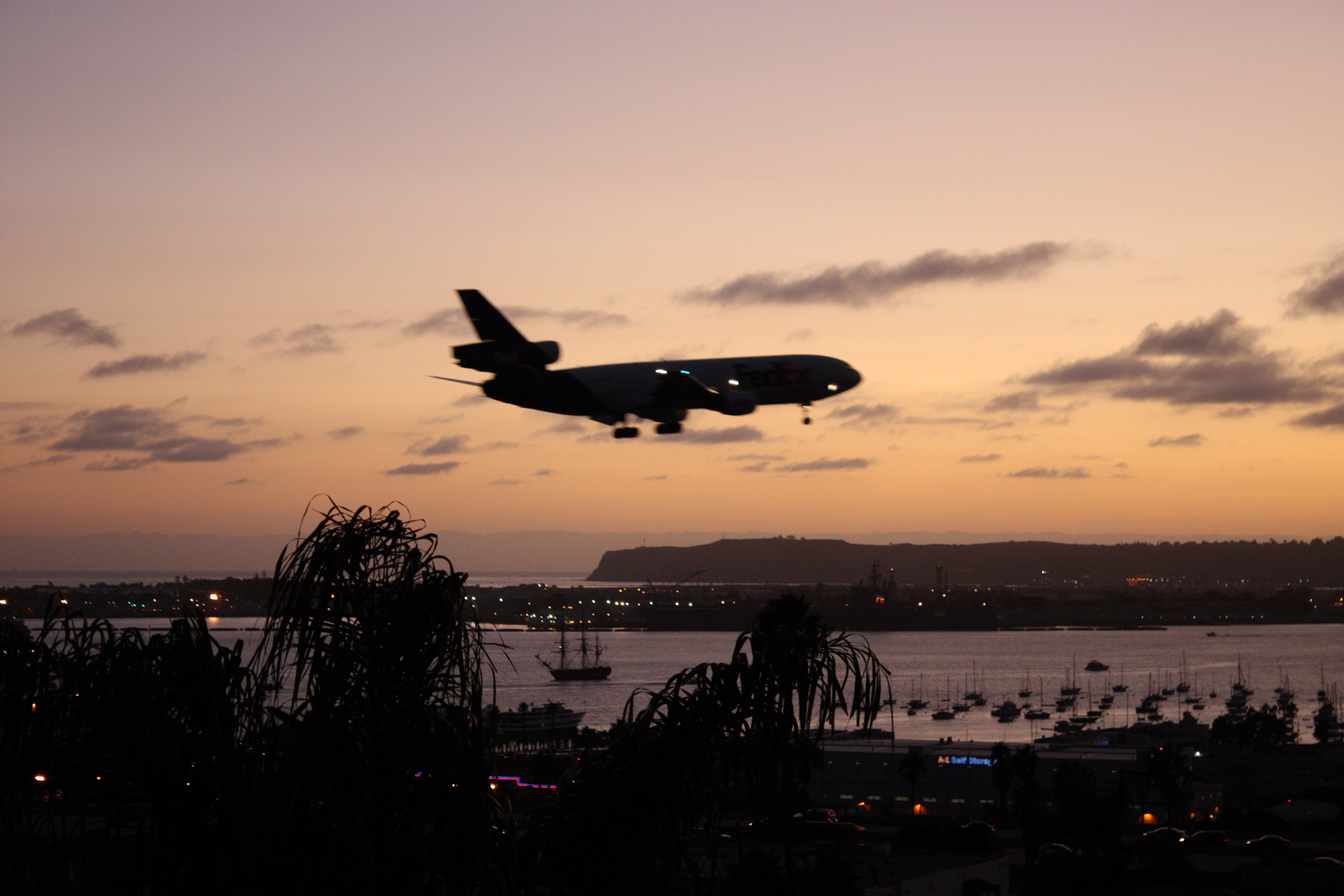
Plane flying into San Diego International Airport

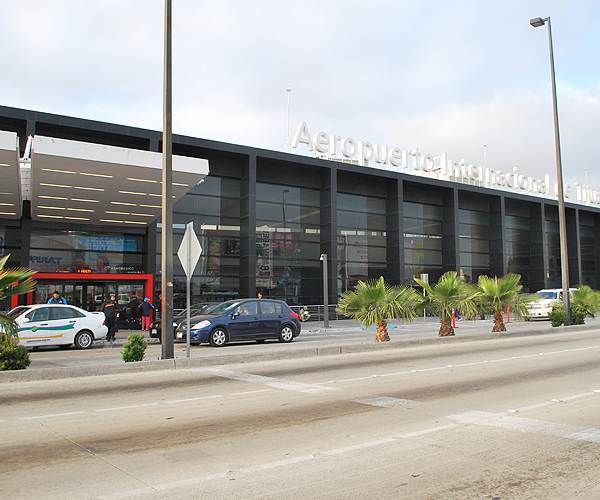
Front of Tijuana International Airport

San Diego–Tijuana is served by of two major international airports: San Diego International Airport and Tijuana International Airport (General Abelardo L. Rodríguez), and one regional airport McClellan–Palomar Airport (Carlsbad).

San Diego International Airport is located 3 mi (4.8 km) northwest of Centre City and 20 mi (32 km) from Tijuana. Operated by the San Diego County Regional Airport Authority, the airport is the busiest single-runway commercial airport in the world. SAN served 22,009,921 in 2021. As of June 2023, San Diego International Airport is served by 16 passenger airlines.

In 2022 the Tijuana International Airport served 12,324,600 passengers. It is the fourth busiest airport in Mexico and serves as the focus city for Aeroméxico. The Cross Border Xpress consists of a pedestrian toll bridge which directly links the terminal in Mexico with the CBX terminal on the U.S. side – the only airport in the world with terminals on the territory of two countries.

McClellan-Palomar Airport is located near the central business district of Carlsbad, serving North County. However, the airport does not currently have any passenger service.

The top ten flights in 2022 to 2023 from all three airports were to Mexico City with 1,191,875 passengers, Guadalajara with 1,068,321 passengers, Las Vegas with 837,000 passengers, Denver with 704,000 passengers, San Jose with approximately 661,000 passengers, Sacramento with 654,000 passengers, Phoenix with 641,000 passengers, San Francisco with 625,000, Seattle/Tacoma with 610,000 passengers, Dallas/Fort Worth with 532,000 passengers.

=== Ports of Entry ===
San Ysidro Port of Entry
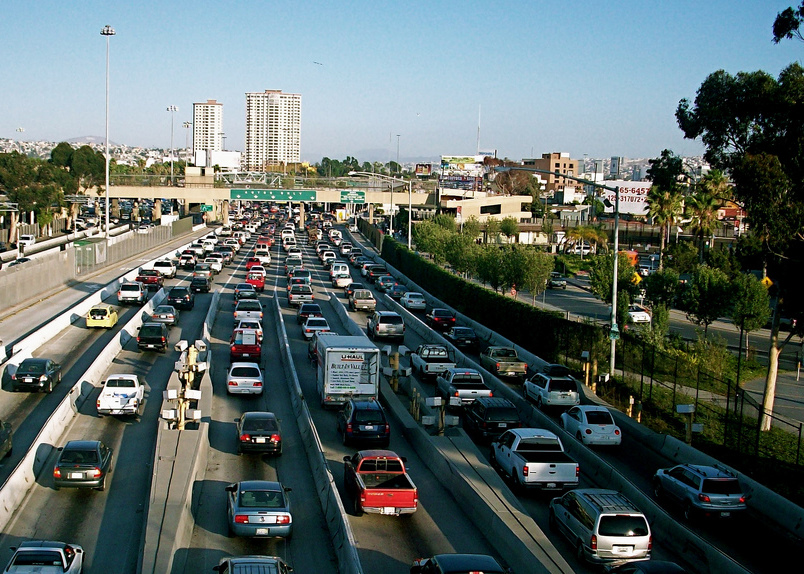
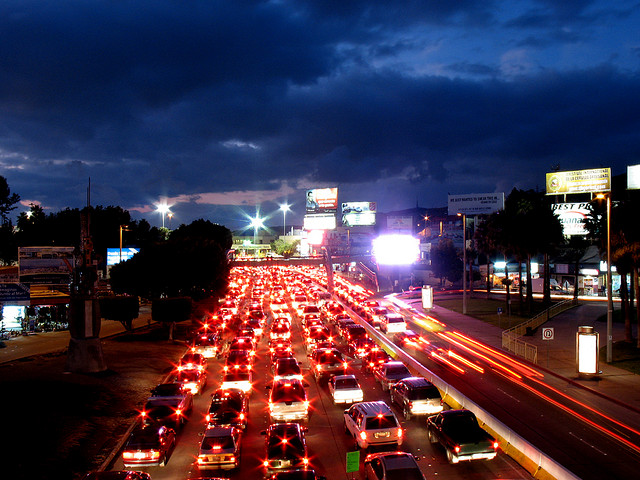
Traffic at the San Ysidro Port of Entry, the busiest international border crossing in the world

In 2002, according to the San Diego Association of Governments (SANDAG), the number of trucks driving north through the Otay Mesa Port of Entry numbered over 725,710, representing approximately $20 billion worth of freight. Over time congestion has increased as the population of the region has grown at a high rate. San Diego and Tijuana have both begun collaborative renovation plans in order to ease border congestion. The San Ysidro Land Port of Entry Expansion Project involves adding ten lanes to the San Ysidro border crossing and the creation of the El Chaparral Port of Entry. Another plan includes adding an extra border crossing to the east of Otay Mesa with completion estimated for the year 2015. Projects such as these will attempt to reduce the loss of millions of dollars per day due to waiting at the border.

There are currently three ports of entry serving the metropolitan region. The San Ysidro Port of Entry/El Chaparral expansion projects, and the opening of the new Otay Mesa East Port of Entry, will add significant capacity. The most trafficked port of entry is the San Ysidro Port of Entry—the busiest international crossing in the world. It serves as the primary entry point for the commuting populace of the metropolitan region. The Cross Border Xpress pedestrian border crossing, which opened December 9, 2015, is for the exclusive use of ticketed passengers at Tijuana International Airport. Further east, the Otay Mesa Port of Entry deals with high volumes of commercial traffic as it is located in the manufacturing zone of the region. The Otay Mesa Port accounts for billions of dollars' worth of product. Further east, the Otay Mesa East Port of Entry is planned. And the farthest east, the Tecate Port of Entry is the smallest port of entry and is not designed for dealing with large volumes of traffic as it follows a long winding road through the Mountain Empire.

Many businesses in South Bay offer Mexican car insurance on a short-term, prepaid basis. Most large car rental companies in San Diego do permit their vehicles to be taken across the border but generally require a hefty fee, sometimes costing more than the rental, for Mexican auto insurance. Visitors to the region should note that automobile insurance does not travel across the international border. Vehicles registered in Mexico may also require separate insurance for use in the United States. In California Automobile insurance is required by the State.

== Higher education ==
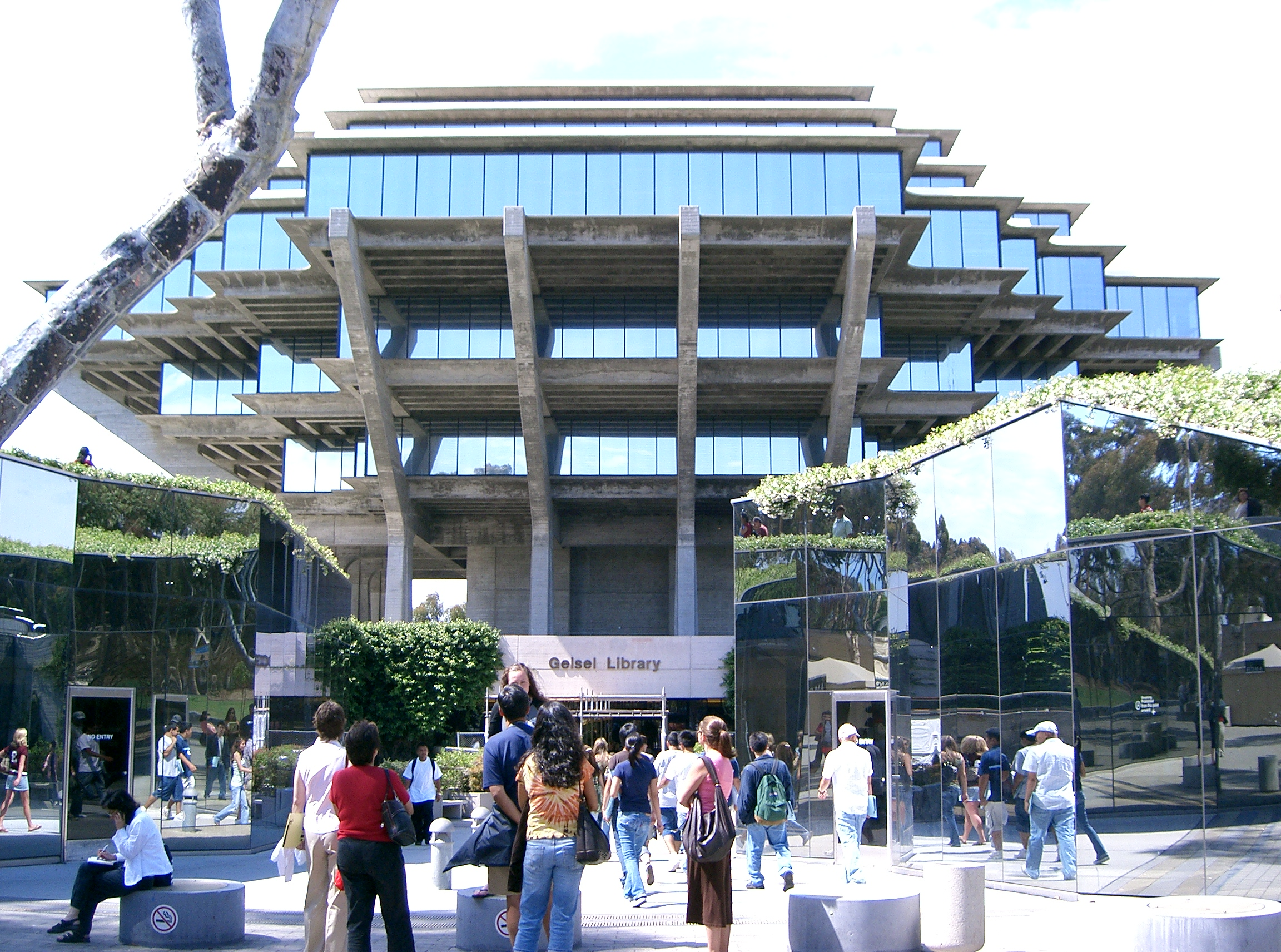
Geisel Library at the University of California, San Diego

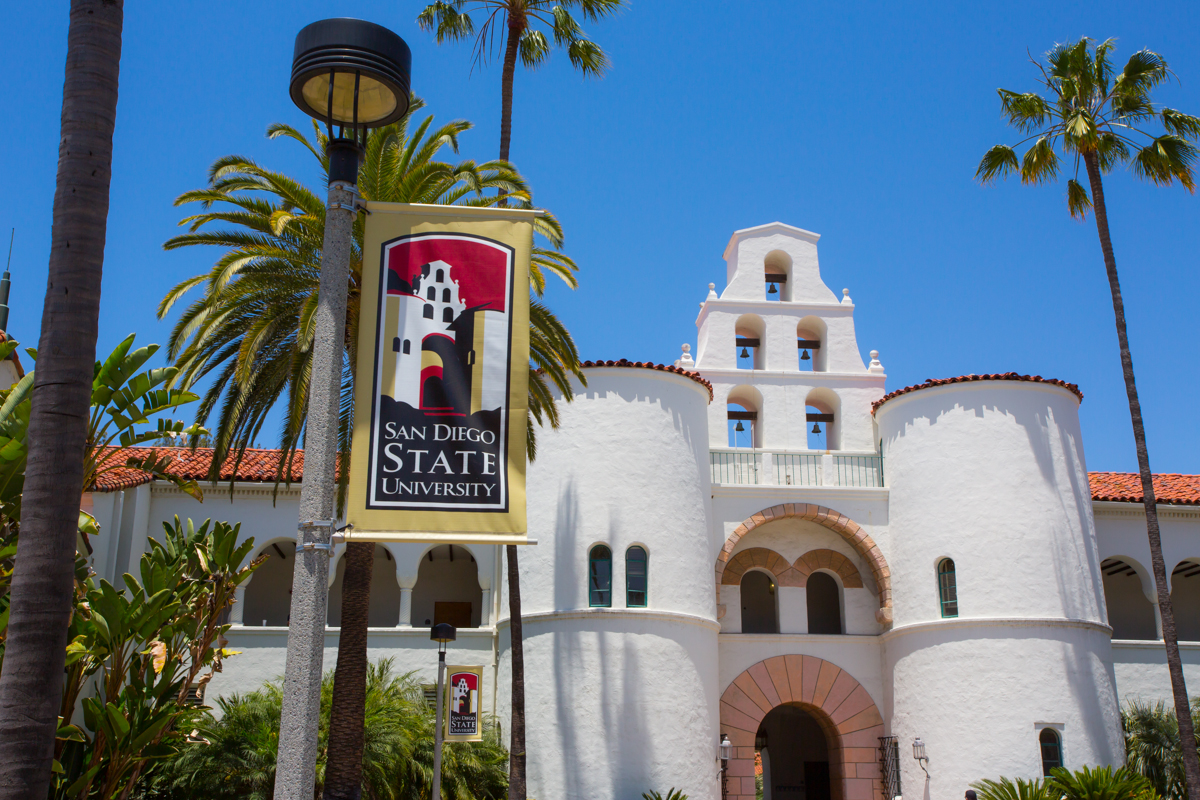
Hepner Hall at San Diego State University

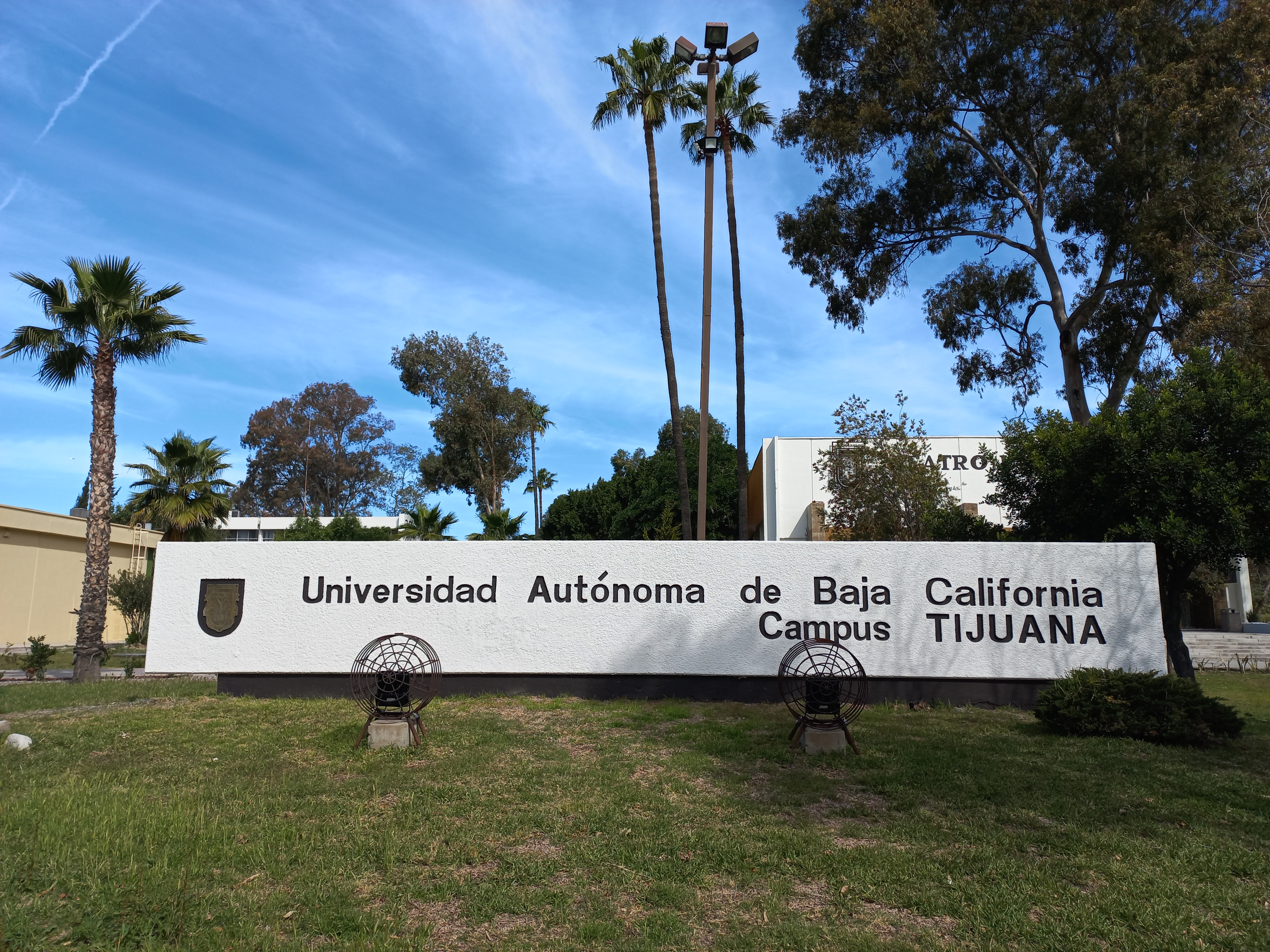
Entrance sign at the Autonomous University of Baja California

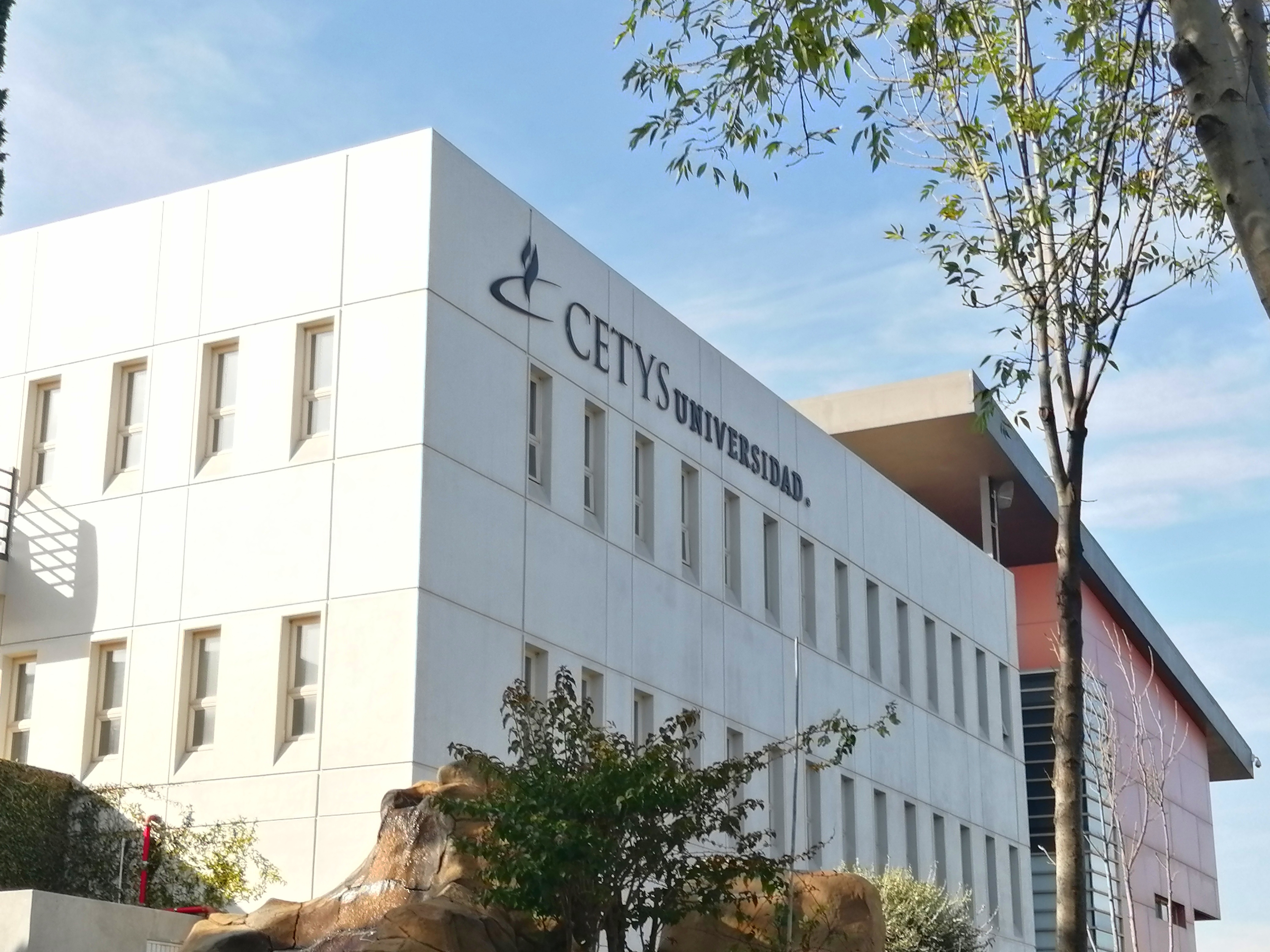
Post-graduate studies building at Centro de Enseñanza Técnica y Superior (CETYS)

The region is home to over twenty higher education schools including numerous universities, private, and state colleges and maintains an excellent educational infrastructure. Tijuana is home to high ranked national colleges and universities and San Diego is ninth most educated city in the United States.

Notable schools included the Autonomous University of Baja California (Tijuana campus); Ibero-American University (Tijuana campus); CETYS University (Tijuana campus); University of San Diego (USD); San Diego State University (SDSU); University of California, San Diego (UC San Diego); California Western School of Law; and Thomas Jefferson School of Law. Of the colleges in San Diego–Tijuana, UC San Diego is the highest ranked college; ranking as 14th best university in the world by the Academic Ranking of World Universities and in 2010 ranking as the top university in the United States by the Washington Monthly.

== Communication ==
=== Telephone ===
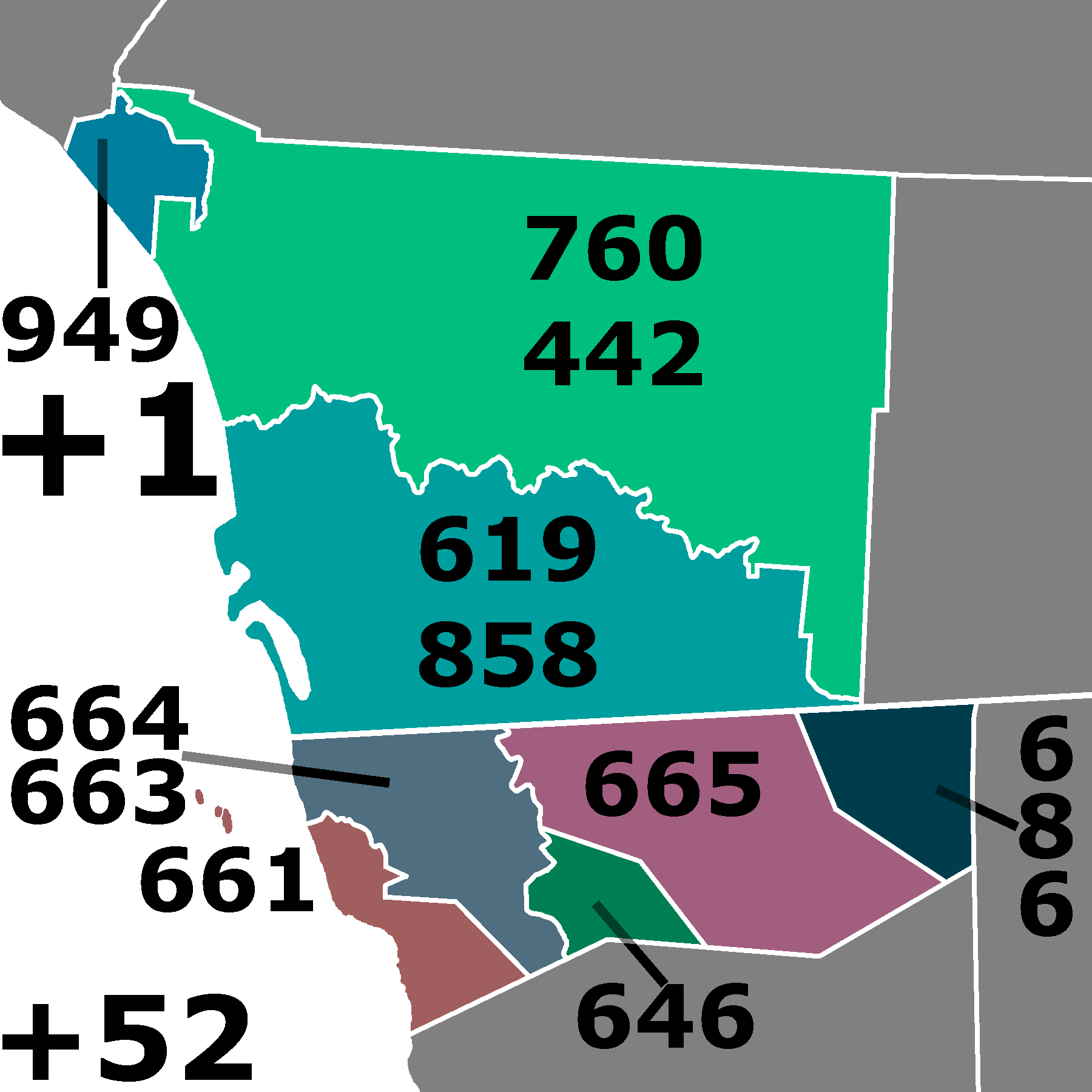
Area codes of the metropolitan area

Telephonic communication between the two cities requires international calling. To call Tijuana from the United States, "011" (the US international call prefix) must be dialed followed by Mexico's country calling code "52"; to call San Diego from Mexico, "00" (the ITU prefix) must be dialed followed by "1" (the North American Numbering Plan calling code). Then the caller will in both cases proceed to dial the area code and the local number.

San Diego County Area Codes

- +1-619
- +1-858
- +1-760
- +1-442
- +1-949

Tijuana Metro Area Codes

- +52-665
- +52-664
- +52-663
- +52-646
- +52-661
- +52-686

=== Broadcasting ===
Limited San Diego television channels are included in Mexican cable in Tijuana and Ensenada.

Broadcasting is shared between the two cities as necessary, as is the case along both land U.S. borders. Frequency coordination means that all broadcast stations must be approved by both countries before making any major changes. In this case, approval is required by the Federal Communications Commission (FCC) in the U.S. and Federal Telecommunications Institute in Mexico. Additionally, the FCC requires a permit to supply programming to a foreign broadcaster for transmission back into the U.S.

==== Television ====
Cooperative frequency coordination between both city regions is quite common; an example is XETV-TV 6, a Tijuana-based television station used to target audiences in San Diego until its US-based studio closure in 2017, where the K being replaced by the X as an indicator that it is a Mexican-licensed station. These stations were not required to shut down their NTSC analog TV operations in June 2009, as full-powered FCC-licensed stations must. In 2007, a bill in the U.S. Congress called the DTV Border Fix Act was introduced, which would have allowed all stations in San Diego, and all television stations within 80 kilometers (50 mi) of the Mexican border, to keep their analog signals active for another five years, delaying the television transition that the rest of the United States would be going through; while the bill passed the Senate, it did not pass the House.

Prior to the 2017 rules change by the FCC, San Diego was the largest media market in the United States that was legally unable to support a duopoly between two full-power television stations; under the 1999 order, duopolies were not allowed in any U.S. market with fewer than nine full-power stations and once a duopoly is formed, there must be eight unique station owners that remain in a single market. The California side of the market does not fall under either requirement as there are only seven full-power stations in that part of the San Diego–Tijuana metropolitan area. Though two sister stations existed (the E. W. Scripps Company group of KGTV and KZSD-LD, and the NBC Owned Television Stations group of KNSD and KUAN-LD), they are not considered duopolies under the FCC's legal definition as common ownership between full-power and low-power television stations in the same market is permitted regardless to the number of stations licensed to the area. On November 20, 2017, the FCC eliminated the "Eight-Voices Test" requirement, allowing media companies to form duopolies regardless of the number of full-powered stations licensed to each market. The decision allowed Nexstar Media Group, owner of Fox affiliate KSWB-TV, to purchase independent station KUSI-TV from McKinnon Broadcasting on May 8, 2023; the transaction was completed on August 31, creating the first legal duopoly in San Diego.

The Mexico-licensed stations in the market are not subject to the duopoly rules as two or more full-power television stations are allowed to be owned by the same company under Mexican telecommunications law (American-based TelevisaUnivision owns three stations in Tijuana: XETV-TV, XHUAA-TV and XEWT-TV, while Entravision Communications and TV Azteca each own two stations: XHAS-TV and XHDTV-TV, and XHJK-TV and XHTIT-TV, respectively).

==== Radio ====
On radio, relaying programming across the border is even more common, with stations like XHITZ-FM 90.3 and XHMORE-FM 98.9 being programmed by U.S. broadcast groups, while being owned by Mexican companies (as required under Mexican law) and operating under Mexican broadcast law. Other American stations relayed via Mexico through local marketing agreements (LMAs) are XEPE AM 1700, XEPRS AM 1090 and simulcast XHPRS-FM 105.7, XESPN AM 800, XESURF AM 540, XETRA FM 91.1, XHRM FM 92.5, XEWW-AM 690, XHA-FM 94.5, XHFG-FM 107.3, XHGLX-FM 91.7, XHLNC-FM 104.9, and XHTY-FM 99.7. All of these stations are authorized to simulcast digitally in HD Radio, as are other stations within 320 kilometers (200 mi) of the U.S. border.

Because many stations in the reserved band (FM below 92 MHz) are used by Mexican stations, other specific allotments are reserved for non-commercial educational (NCE) radio stations in the San Diego area. However, the lack of such allotments still leaves the area with no college radio stations available except via Internet radio, cable radio, LPAM, and TV SAP. These are KCR from San Diego State University, and KSDT from the University of California, San Diego.

Under Mexican law, radio stations located in Mexico must broadcast the Mexican National Anthem twice daily and broadcast public affairs program La Hora Nacional on Sunday evenings.

== Other infrastructure ==
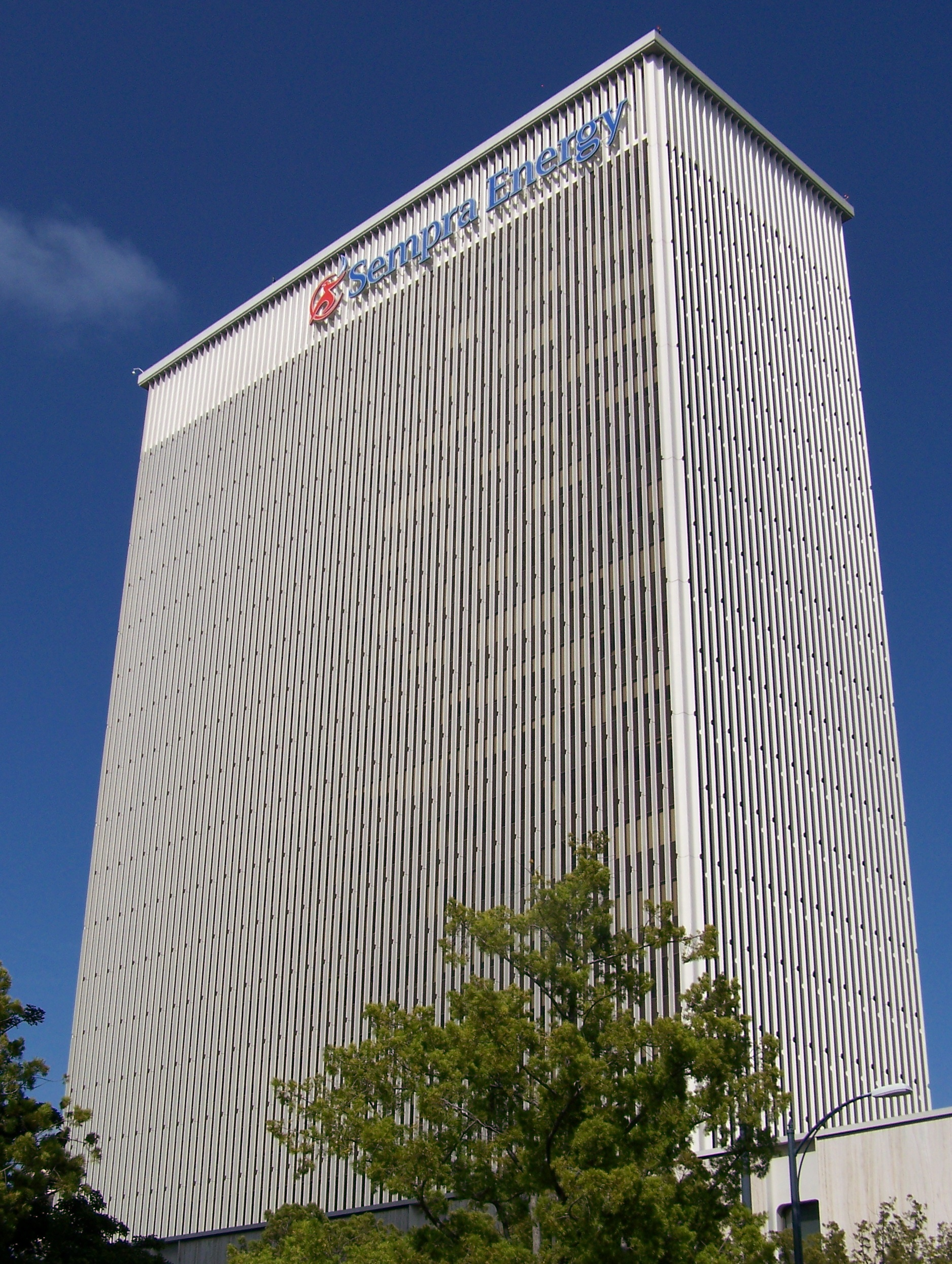
Sempra Corporate Headquarters in San Diego

The metropolitan region has developed many utilities which have primary focus on energy and environmental health. A focal point of cross-border environmental relations is the care of the Tijuana River Estuary. The International Boundary Wastewater Treatment Plant (IWTP) was developed by the International Boundary and Water Commission (IBWC) as a joint project between the US and Mexico in the mid-1990s following substantial environmental studies regarding the polluting effects of the river system from run-off and untreated water on the Tijuana side of the border region. The facility now treats sewage flows exceeding the capacity of the present Tijuana sewage treatment system. The plant directly assists in the restoration of the Tijuana River Valley. Another collaborative effort between the two cities was the environmentally friendly development of paved roads – created by placing concrete blocks on dirt roads – in the San Bernardo neighborhood of northwestern Tijuana. Whilst being a good example for overall development of Tijuana, it served to retain water in the earth and prevented possible negative impacts from floodwater.

=== Water ===
San Diego–Tijuana relies heavily on water from the Colorado River. Approximately half of San Diego–Tijuana's fresh water is used for non-drinking purposes, including landscape irrigation, commercial enterprise, and industrial processing. Methods such as saltwater desalination provides options for obtaining fresh water. Cities in the metropolitan region such as Carlsbad have begun desalination projects of their own, without a bi-national conference. The Carlsbad desalination plant is the largest desalination plant in the United States. It was opened in December 2015, and produces 50-million gallons a day; enough water to supply 10% of San Diego region residents with drinking water.

=== Energy ===
The policies shared between San Diego and Tijuana are addressed in a binational way as the effects of actions on one side of the border, with regard to infrastructure, are felt on the neighboring side. In the past decade San Diego–Tijuana has developed new cooperative strategies to make energy consumption more efficient and effectively supply energy. In 2000 Sempra Energy constructed a natural gas pipeline to provide energy to a thermal power plant in Rosarito; also the principle plant in Baja California. The region was able to reduce levels of air pollution substantially when the conversion to a natural gas fired electrical generation facility was completed. In the Baja California subregions, unleaded gasoline has also replaced leaded fuel as means for transportation, helping regional air quality. The new strategies also included plans that worked with the nearby capital of Mexicali, where the pipeline shared between the two states was constructed to supply natural gas to its metropolitan area with energy supplied by Sempra and Proxima. Sempra Energy has been applauded for its initial development of this cross-border infrastructure.

On April 19, 2011, it was reported by the San Diego Union-Tribune that San Diego Gas & Electric signed a twenty-year deal with Sempra Generation to obtain power generated by the Energia Sierra Juarez Project, a wind farm of 450 wind turbines, taking up an area predominantly in the Tecate region of Baja California larger than Anza Borrego Desert State Park. Energia Sierra Juarez is slated for construction in 2012, though the deal has yet to be approved by the California Public Utilities Commission.

== Culture ==
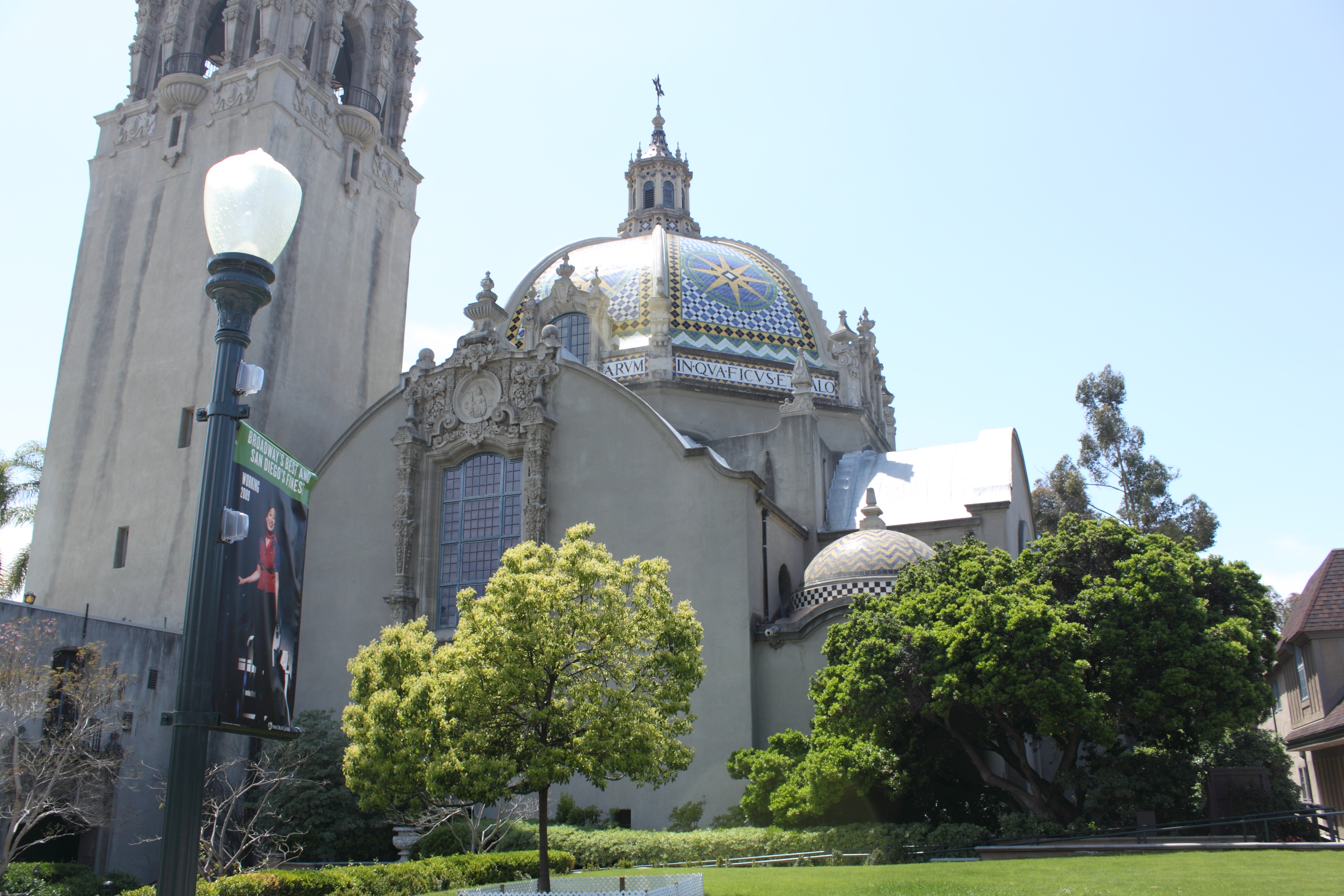
Museum of Us in San Diego

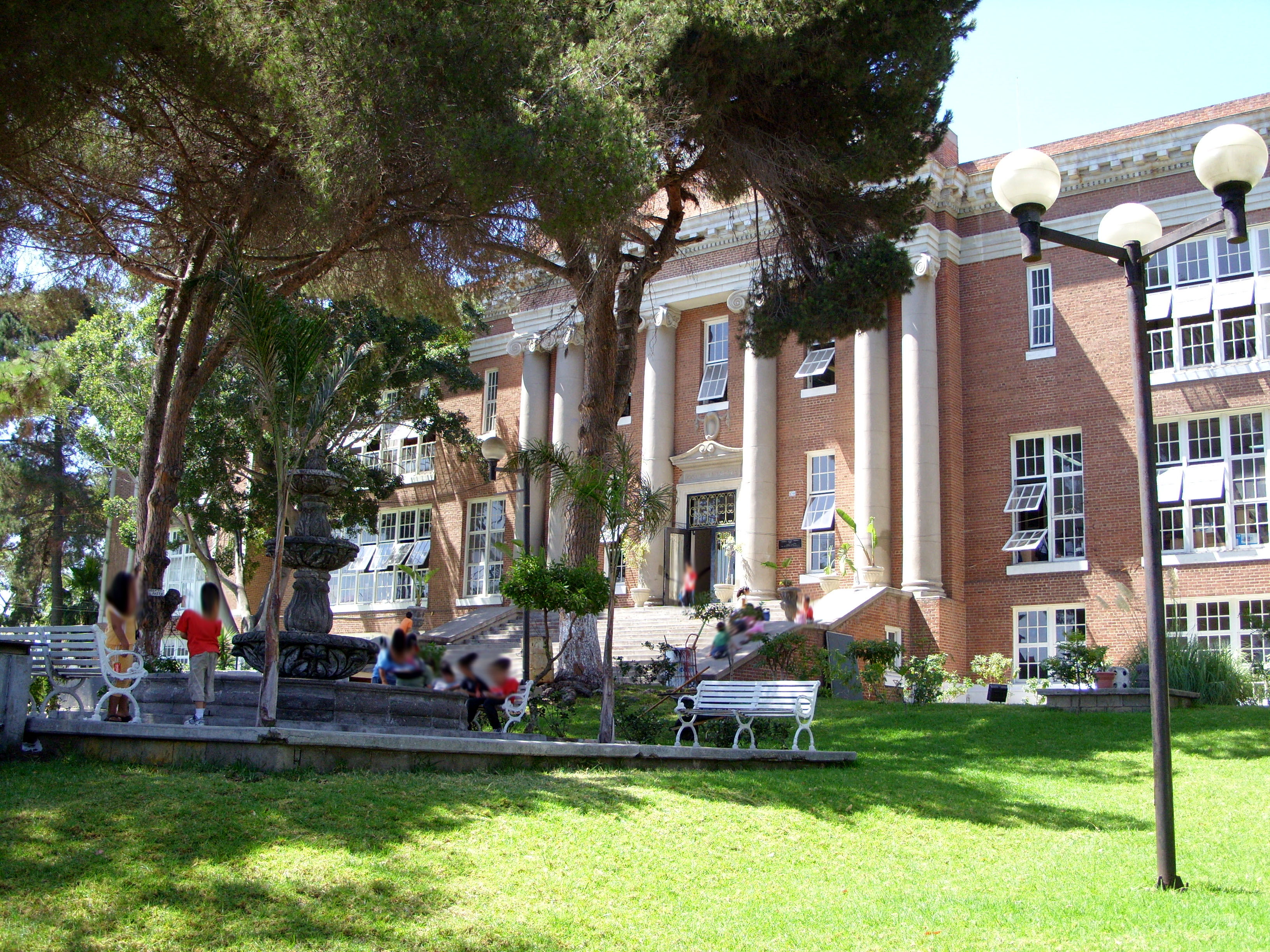
Tijuana's House of Culture

The sister cities of the metropolitan region have a complex and rich cultural exchange.

The cultural activities present on both sides of the border provide artists a benefited cultural activity sector. Art organizations on both sides of the border have binational programs. Mainly Mozart (Festival Binacional de Mozart) performs, for both cities of California and Baja California, with internationally known musicians and orchestras. In San Diego, the Opera's Ensemble tours the metropolitan region every year performing over 150 performances in the regions educational institutions, cultural centers, and concert venues. Additionally, the Museum of Contemporary Art San Diego actively promotes the binational arts culture in the area and has displayed exhibitions highlighting the border experience.

The metropolitan region has become a magnet for artists from abroad. Musicians and visual artists from Russia, Mexico, and Eastern Europe are now found in organizations such as the Orchestra of Baja California.

The cultural region is the home of many museums and landmarks. The regions cultural institutions and landmarks are in part comprised by the many institutions of Balboa Park, Tijuana Cultural Center, the Maritime Museum of San Diego – a collection of large historic American vessels, Cabrillo National Monument, Christ of the Sacred Heart, Mission San Diego de Alcalá, Mission San Luis Rey de Francia, Old Town San Diego State Historic Park, and museum at San Pasqual Battlefield State Historic Park. Local beach culture is in part represented by the California Surf Museum.

=== Border influence ===
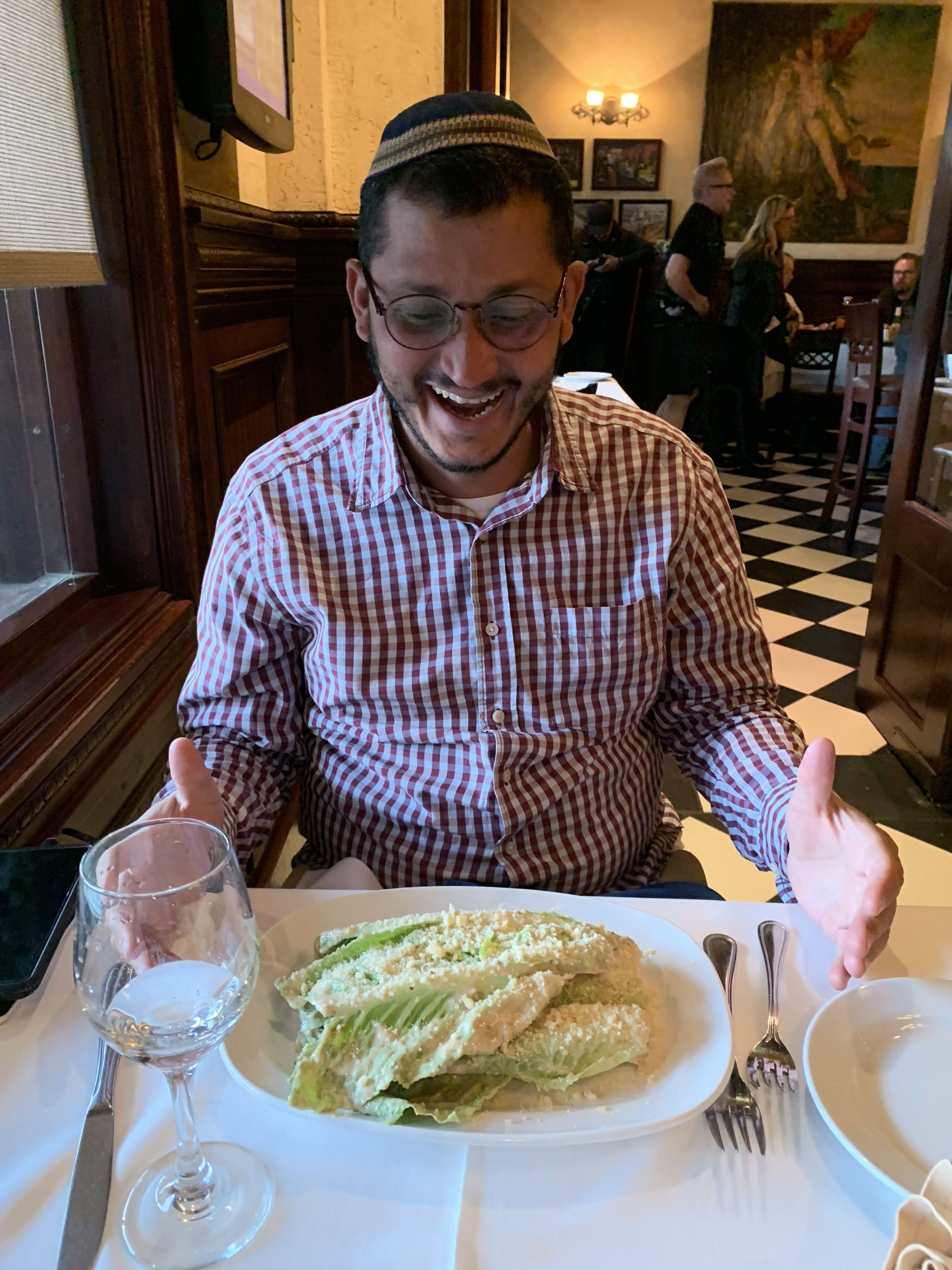
The Caesar salad finds roots in the cross border culture of 1920s American Prohibition, when San Diegans would take trips to Tijuana to legally consume alcohol. Caesar salad was invented by an Italian immigrant living in San Diego who owned a popular restaurant for drinking in Tijuana. Today, young San Diegans under 21 still cross into Tijuana for the 18 years old drinking age.

In a region where Mexican traditional culture and American contemporary culture clash, native artists benefit from the manifested diverse cultural influences.

Tijuana's adjacent location to San Diego fuels its intrigue for artists and art curators. A growing number of artists and musicians have begun challenging the sometimes negative stereotype of Tijuana through exhibitions displaying the city as a place of contingency and creativity. San Diego–Tijuana has been considered "one of the hottest interfaces between first and third worlds." Artists attraction to San Diego–Tijuana's arts and culture scene was accredited by the Tucson Weekly to the environment created by one of the richest and most developed cities – San Diego – border proximity to a once third world type city – Tijuana.

=== Cuisine ===
Food in the region has been greatly attributed from its position on the US-Mexican border. The region has also been influenced by immigrants who migrated to the area.

==== Alcohol ====
The region is also home to many wineries and craft breweries scattered throughout the region, with San Diego's craft brewery industry, Tijuana's proximity to the wineries in Valle de Guadalupe, and Tecate's Cerveza Tecate owned by Cuauhtémoc Moctezuma Brewery. Tijuana and Tecate's growth could be attributed to the influx of American alcohol tourism in the 1920s to evade the US prohibition of alcohol.

=== International recognition ===
The culture of San Diego–Tijuana is international and cosmopolitan, reflecting the values of each city. Tijuana's emerging vibrant culture scene plays and undeniable role in the art enrichment of its neighborhoods. The metropolitan regions southern anchor city, Tijuana, was identified by Newsweek International as one of the top eight creative cities in the world. It was recognized for its amalgamation of traditional Mexican Norteño music by cities as far away as Tokyo and Berlin. Berlin's Haus der Kulturen der Welt attributed Tijuana as the "cradle of Mexican rock... where the music of the future is being born in Mexico." According to Britain's Guardian Newspaper, "Tijuana is in the middle of an artistic flowering in which artists are re-examining the city's hybrid binational culture." Tijuana has been gaining recognition as a culinary center for the Baja Med fusion cuisine.

In the five years prior to 2004 Tijuana's visual arts were sought out by European exhibitions, and received notable focus from Germany. An international exhibition in Hamburg titled Unlikely Encounters in Urban Space portrayed the developed environment in Eastern Tijuana as well as in New Delhi, Mar de Plata, Milan, Berlin, Munich, and Hamburg.

==== Cultural enclaves ====
Additionally, the metropolitan area is home to many cultural enclaves from around the world not including American and Mexican enclaves they have of each other.

Enclave Name	Neighborhood	Community Represented	Official Recognition or Dedicated District
European Ethnic Enclaves
Little Italy	Little Italy, San Diego	Italian Americans	Yes, 1996
	Zona Centro, Tijuana	Trentino Italo-Mexicano	No
	Valle de Guadalupe, Ensenada	Trentino Italo-Mexicano	No
Little Portugal CBD	Avenida de Portugal, Roseville-Fleetridge, San Diego	Portuguese Americans	No
Olivenhain	Olivenhain, Encinitas	German Americans	Yes, 1890s
Asian Ethnic Enclaves
Barrio Chino	La Mesa, Tijuana	Chinese Mexicans	No
Little Saigon	City Heights, San Diego	Vietnamese Americans	Yes, June 4, 2013
	City Heights, San Diego	Cambodian Americans	No
Convoy District (Convoy Pan Asian Cultural & Business Innovation District)	Kearny Mesa, San Diego	Asian Americans: Taiwanese (Northwest); Chinese and Korean (Central); Japanese (East); Southeast Asian (South)	Yes, October 20, 2020
	National City, California & Paradise Hills, San Diego	Filipino Americans	No
Manila Mesa	Mira Mesa, San Diego	Filipino Americans	No
Little India (Center)	Black Mountain Road, Miramar, San Diego	Indian Americans	No
	Linda Vista, San Diego	Southeast Asian American	No
	Golden Hill, San Diego	Southeast Asian American	No
	East Clairemont Mesa	Thai Americans	No
	Chollas View, San Diego	Laotian Americans	No
Pacific Islander Ethnic Enclaves
Little Samoa	Oceanside, California	Samoan Americans	No
	Oceanside & Vista	Pacific Islander Americans	No
	Mission Beach, San Diego	Pacific Islander Americans	No
	Spring Valley, San Diego County, California	Pacific Islander Americans	No
Middle Eastern Ethnic Enclaves
Little Baghdad	El Cajon, La Mesa, & Spring Valley, CA	Iraqi Americans, Assyrian Americans	No
La Jolla Eruv	La Jolla	Jewish Americans	Documented
University City Eruv	South University City, San Diego	Jewish Americans	Documented
College Area Eruv	College Area, San Diego	Jewish Americans	Documented
San Carlos Eruv	San Carlos, San Diego	Jewish Americans	Pending
African, African American, and Afro-Caribbean Ethnic Enclaves
Little Moghadishu / Little Somalia	City Heights, San Diego	Somali Americans	No
	City Heights, San Diego	Sudanese Americans & South Sudanese Americans	No
Pequeña Haití	Cañon del Alacrán, Divina Providencia, Tijuana	Haitian Mexicans	No
	Southeast San Diego	African Americans	No
Indigenous Ethnic Enclaves/Reservations
Sycuan Band of the Kumeyaay Nation		Kumeyaay	Yes, 1875
San Pasqual Band of Diegueno Mission Indians		Kumeyaay	Yes, 1910
Jamul Indian Village		Kumeyaay	Yes, 1912
Barona Group of Capitan Grande Band of Mission Indians		Kumeyaay	Yes, 1932
Juntas de Neji	Southern Tecate Municipality	Kumeyaay	
San José de la Zorra	San José de la Zorra, Baja California	Kumeyaay	
Rincon Band of Luiseño Indians		Payómkawichum (Luiseño)	Yes, 1875
Pauma Band of Luiseno Mission Indians of the Pauma & Yuima Reservation, California		Payómkawichum (Luiseño)	Yes, 1893
Pala Band of Luiseno Mission Indians of the Pala Reservation		Payómkawichum (Luiseño) Kuupangaxwichem (Cupeño)	Yes, 1901
Hatam's Village (Hata'am)	Balboa Park (San Diego)	Native Californians & Native Baja Californians	Dismantled 1900s
Other Latin American Ethnic Enclaves
El Barretal	Matamoros Norte-Centro-Sur, Tijuana	Hondurans & Guatemalans; Central American migrant caravans	No
	City Heights, San Diego	Salvadoran Americans	No
	Escondido, California	Mexican Americans & Central Americans	No
	El Cajon, California	Puerto Ricans	No
LGBTQ Enclaves
Hillcrest Gayborhood	Hillcrest, San Diego	LGBT Americans	No
	Zona Centro, Tijuana	LGBT Mexicans	No
	Alpine, California	Lesbian Americans	No

=== Sports ===
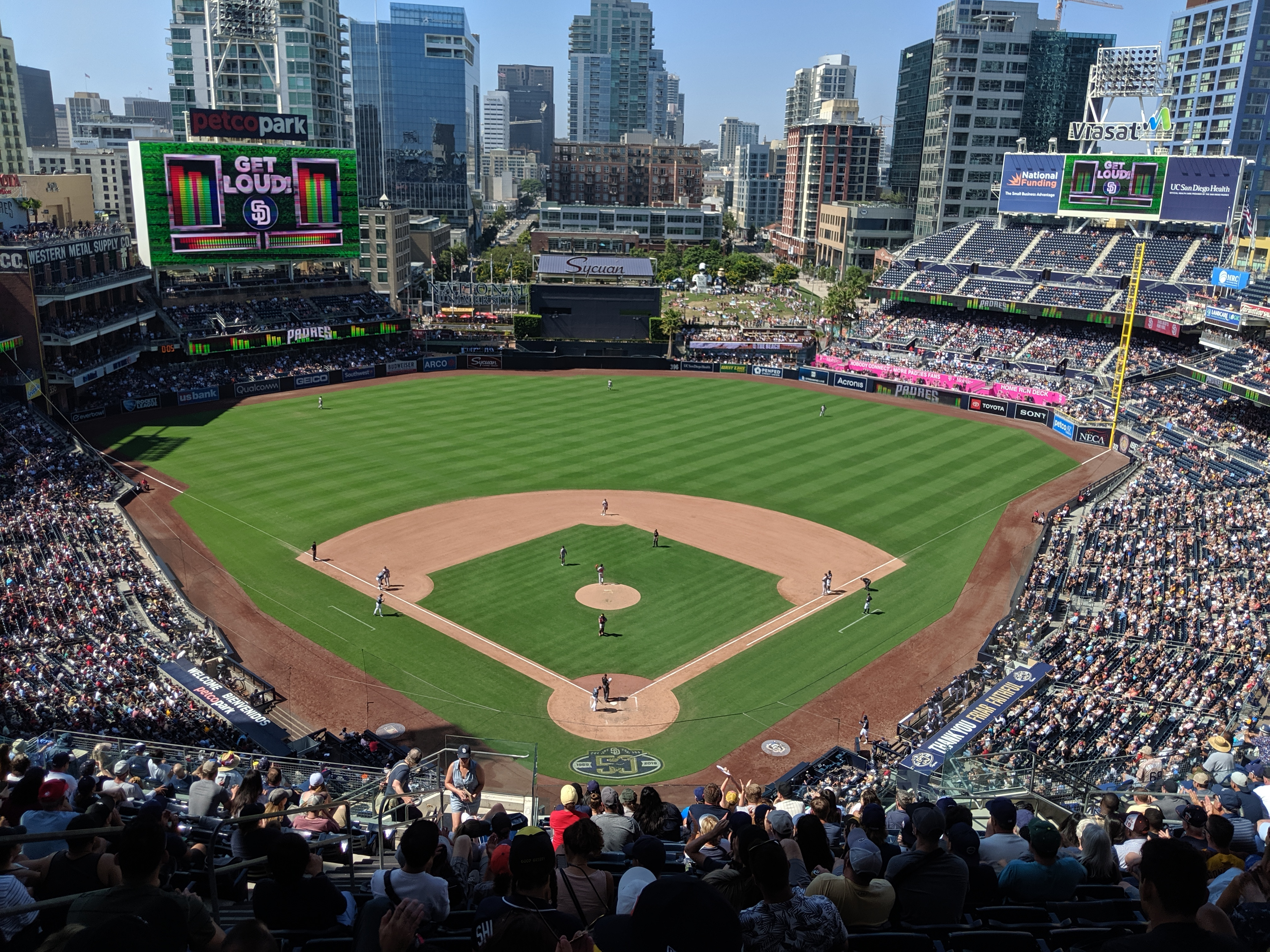
Petco Park

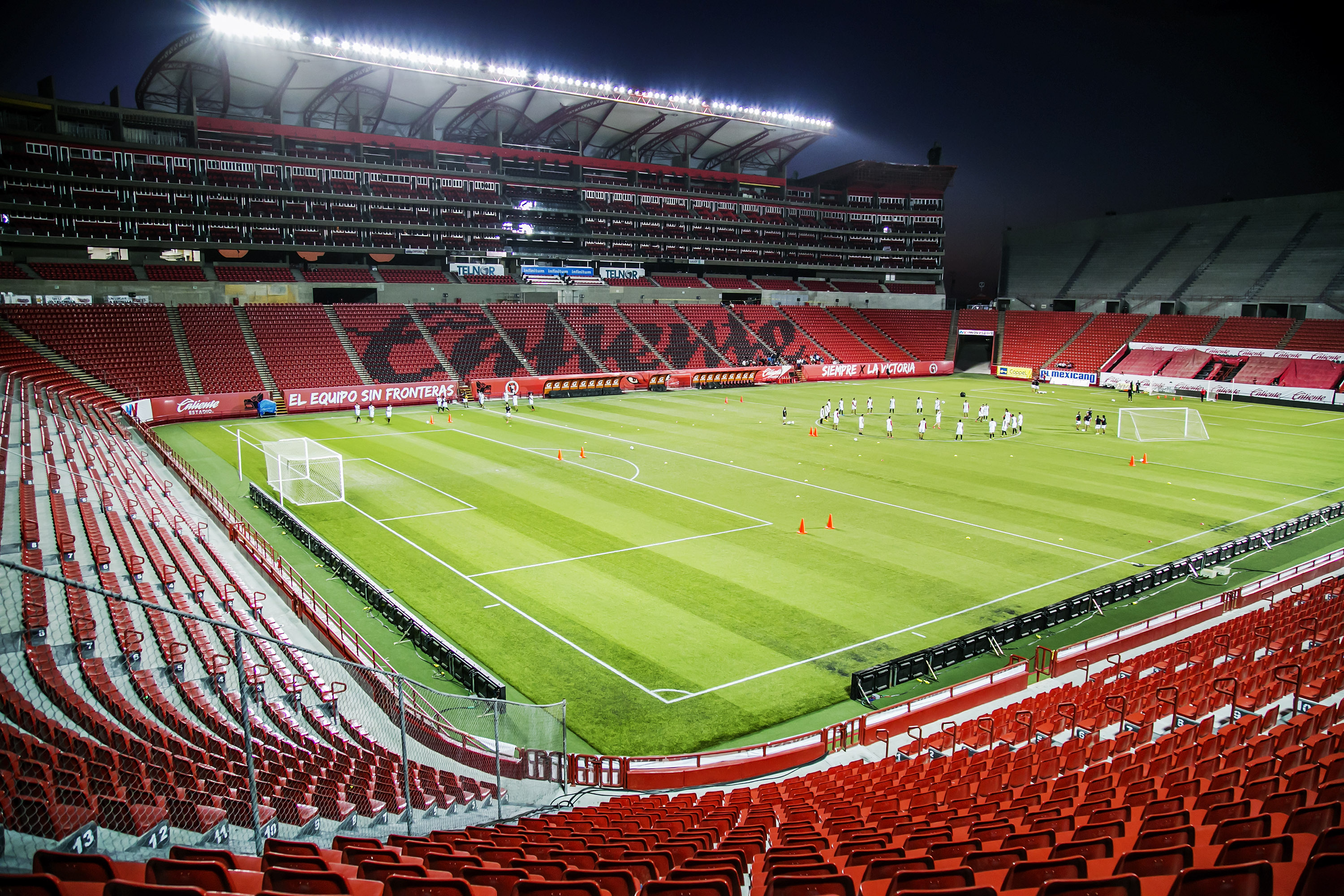
Estadio Caliente

The most prominent sports in the area are baseball and association football. San Diego is the home of the San Diego Padres of Major League Baseball (MLB) and San Diego FC of Major League Soccer (MLS). Tijuana is the home of Club Tijuana of Liga MX and the Toros de Tijuana of the Mexican League (LMB).

Watersports and boardsports form a large part of San Diego–Tijuana sports culture. Sailing is popular in the San Diego Bay and Mission Bay areas. The San Diego–Ensenada International Yacht Race is hosted by Southwestern Yacht Club of San Diego. The region is known for its avid surfing scene; well-known destinations include Swami's and Baja Malibu.

In a sign of binational friendship, San Diegans – Team USA – and Tijuanenses – Team Mexico – played in a friendly game of "border volleyball" at Border Field State Park, in which volleyballs were passed over the international border fence splitting the beach. This was the first game of international border volleyball and garnered national media attention.

In the mid-2000s, the Binational Organizing Committee (BiNOC) of San Diego–Tijuana made it known that the sister-cities were interested in making a bid for the 2016 Summer Olympics. The proposed bid intentionally rivaled Los Angeles' bid for the 2016 games. However, the U.S. Olympic Committee (USOC) decided against the binational bid.

== See also ==
- Metropolitan areas of Mexico § Transnational conurbations
- California megapolitan areas
- List of California urban areas
- List of metropolitan areas in the Americas
