= List of marinas =

This is a list of marinas in various countries.

== Albania ==
- Orikum Marina, Orikum, Vlore

== Australia ==
=== New South Wales ===
- Sydney
  - Empire Marina, Bobbin Head
  - Akuna Bay Marina
  - Berowra Waters
  - Blakehurst Marina, Blakehurst
  - Woolwich Marina, Woolwich
  - Cabarita Point, Cabarita
  - Darling Harbour Marina, Darling Harbour
  - Dolans Bay Marina, Dolans Bay
  - River Quays Marina
  - Rushcutters Bay Marina, Rushcutters Bay
  - The Spit at Mosman
- Coffs Harbour
- Nelson Bay
- Batemans Bay
- Kearnzy
- Glouscester Marina Weaver
- Shellharbour Marina

=== Queensland ===
- South East Queensland
  - Gold Coast
    - Gold Coast City Marina
    - Hope Harbour Marina, Hope Island
    - Horizon Shores Marina
    - Sanctuary Cove Marina, Sanctuary Cove
    - Southport Yacht Club, Southport
  - Brisbane
    - Scarborough Marina, Scarborough
    - Gardens Point Marina
    - Dockside Marina, Kangaroo Point
    - Newport Waterways Marina, Moreton Bay
    - Heron's Moorings, Hemmant
    - Waterfront Place Marina, Eagle Street Pier
    - East Coast Marina, Manly
    - Cleveland Marina, Cleveland
    - Raby Bay Marina
    - Queensland Cruising Yacht Club
- Sunshine Coast
  - Noosa Harbour Marina, Noosa Heads
  - Kawana Waters Marina, Kawana Waters
  - Mooloolaba Marina, Mooloolaba
- Central Queensland
  - Mackay Marina, Mackay
  - Gladstone Marina, Gladstone
  - Bundaberg Port Marina, Bundaberg
  - Hervey Bay Marina, Hervey Bay
  - Urangan Boat Harbour, Urangan
  - Rosslyn Bay Marina, Rosslyn Bay
  - Keppel Bay Marina, Keppel Bay
- Whitsundays
  - Hamilton Island Marina, Hamilton Island
  - Hayman Island Marina, Hayman Island
  - Shute Harbour Marina, Shute Harbour
  - Abel Point Marina, Abel Point
- North Queensland
  - The Breakwater Marina, Townsville
  - Townsville Motorboat & Yacht Club, Townsville
  - Half Moon Bay Marina, Yorkeys Knob
  - Cairns Marlin Marina, Cairns
  - Crystalbrook Superyacht Marina, Port Douglas

=== South Australia ===
- Adelaide metropolitan waterfront:
  - Gulf Point Marina, North Haven
  - Holdfast Shores Marina, Glenelg
  - Newport Quays Marina, Port Adelaide
- Copper Cove Marina, Wallaroo
- Hindmarsh Island Marina
- Lake Butler Marina, Robe
- Marina St. Vincent, Wirrina Cove
- Port Lincoln Marina
- Port Vincent Marina
- Tumby Bay Marina

=== Tasmania ===
- Margate Marina, Baretta

=== Victoria ===
- Melbourne Metropolitan & Port Phillip
  - VicUrban Marina, New Quay, Docklands
  - YE Marina, Yarra's Edge, Docklands
  - Melbourne City Marina, Docklands
  - St Kilda Marina, St Kilda
  - Pier 35 Marina, Port Melbourne
  - Sandringham Yacht Club Marina, Sandringham
  - Brighton Yacht Club Marina, Brighton
  - Blairgowrie Yacht Squadron Marina, Blairgowrie
  - Parsons Marina, Williamstown
  - Anchorage Marina, Williamstown
  - Williamstown Yacht Club Marina, Williamstown
  - Peninsula Marina, Seaford
  - Whalers Cove Marina
  - Patterson Lakes Marina
- Regional
  - Port Fairy Marina, Port Fairy
  - Bay City Marina, Geelong
  - Queenscliff Marina, Queenscliff
  - Western Port Marina, Hastings, Western Port Bay
  - Yaringa Boat Harbour Marina, Sommerville, Western Port Bay
  - Lakes Entrance Marina, Lakes Entrance
  - Port of Sale Marina, Sale
  - Loch Sport Marina, Loch Sport

=== Western Australia ===
- Mindarie Keys, Mindarie
- Hillarys Boat Harbour, Hillarys
- Mandurah Ocean Marina, Mandurah
- Port Bouvard Marina, Wannanup
- Two Rocks Marina, Two Rocks
- Albany Waterfront, Albany
- Batavia Coast Marina, Geraldton
- Port Geographe Marina, Geographe

=== Northern Territory ===
- Darwin
  - Cullen Bay Marina
  - Tipperary Waters Marina
  - Bayview Marina

== Azerbaijan ==
- Baku Marina
- Port of Baku
- Marina Village Sea Breeze, Nardaran, Baku

== Barbados ==
=== Saint Peter ===
- Port Saint Charles, Six Men's Bay
- Port Ferdinand, Retreat

== Belgium ==
- Vlaamse Yachthaven Nieuwpoort

== Cambodia ==
- Marina Oceania, Sihanoukville Autonomous Port

== Canada ==
=== British Columbia ===
==== Sunshine Coast ====
- Sunshine Coast of Canada

==== Gabriola Island ====
- Silva Bay Resort & Marina, British Columbia

==== Burrard Inlet ====
- Reed Point Marina

==== Quadra Island ====
- Quadra Island

===== Maple Bay =====
- Maple Bay Marina, Maple Bay

=== Manitoba ===
==== Lake Winnipeg ====
- Gimli Harbour, Gimli
- Silver Harbour, Gimli
- Riverton Marina, Riverton

=== Nova Scotia ===
==== Cape Breton Island ====
===== Bras d'Or Lake =====
- Baddeck Marine, Baddeck
- Barra Strait Marina (Grand Narrows), Grand Narrows (Barra Strait)
- Ben Eoin Marina, Ben Eoin (East Bay)
- Bras d'Or Yacht Club, Baddeck
- Cape Breton Boatyard (Baddeck), Baddeck
- St Peter's Lions Club Marina, St. Peter's

===== East Coast / Cabot Strait =====
- Ingonish Landing (South Ingonish Harbour)

====== Sydney Harbour ======
- Dobson Yacht Club, Westmount (Sydney)
- Northern Yacht Club, North Sydney
- Royal Cape Breton Yacht Club, Sydney

===== Eastern Shore, Strait of Canso & Lennox Passage =====
- Isle Madame Boat Club, Arichat
- Lennox Passage Yacht Club, D'Escousse
- Port Hawkesbury Marina, Port Hawkesbury

==== Halifax and area ====
- Armdale Yacht Club, Northwest Arm
- Dartmouth Yacht Club, Wright's Cove
- Bedford Basin Yacht Club, Bedford
- Royal Nova Scotia Yacht Squadron, Northwest Arm
- Shearwater Yacht Club, Shearwater (Dartmouth)

==== South Shore ====
- Chester Yacht Club, Chester
- LaHave River Yacht Club, Lahave
- Lunenburg Yacht Club, Lunenburg
- Shelburne Harbour Yacht Club and Marina, Shelburne
- Mahone Bay Civic Marina, Mahone Bay, Nova Scotia

==== Northumberland Strait ====
- Ballantynes Cove, Ballantynes Cove
- Sunrise Shore Marina, (Home of Barrachois Harbour Yacht Club), Tatamagouche

=== Ontario ===
==== Lake Nipissing ====
- Starlite Marina, Sturgeon Falls

==== Great Lakes ====
===== Lake Huron =====
====== St. Clair River/Lake St. Clair/Detroit River ======
- Windsor Yacht Club, Windsor

====== Georgian Bay ======
- Bay Port Yachting Centre, Midland
- Wye Heritage Marina, Midland

====== North Channel ======
- Bellevue Marina, Sault Ste. Marie
- Blind River Marina, Blind River
- Hilton Beach Marina, Hilton Beach (St. Joseph Island)
- Richard's Landing Marina, Richard's Landing (St. Joseph Island)
- Roberta Bondar Transient Marina, Sault Ste. Marie

===== Ottawa River =====
- Britannia Yacht Club, Ottawa
- Nepean Sailing Club, Ottawa

===== Lake Ontario =====
- Collins Bay Marina, Kingston
- Kingston Yacht Club, Kingston
- Portsmouth Harbour, Kingston

===== Lake Simcoe =====
- Friday Harbour Resort Marina, Innisfil, Ontario

===== Lake Superior =====
- Gitchee Gumee Marina, Haviland Bay
- Bellevue Marina, Sault Ste. Marie
- Roberta Bondar Transient Marina, Sault Ste. Marie
- Buck's Marina, Wawa

===== Lake Erie =====
- MacDonald Turkey Point Marina, Turkey Point

== Croatia ==
There are around 50 marinas operating in Croatia, 21 of them as part of the Adriatic Croatia International (ACI) marina chain.

- ACI Marina Cres, Cres
- ACI Marina Dubrovnik, Dubrovnik
- ACI Marina Kornati, Biograd
- ACI Marina Pula, Pula
- ACI Marina Rovinj, Rovinj
- ACI Marina Split, Split
- ACI Marina Umag, Umag
- Marina Punat, Punat
- Marina Tučepi, Tučepi
- Spinut Marina, Split

== Cyprus ==
- Ayia Napa Marina, Ayia Napa
- Limassol Marina, Limassol

== Dominican Republic ==
=== Las Cabuyas ===
- Aramis Marina & Yacht Club, San Pedro de Macorís Province

== Egypt ==
- Hurghada Marina Boulevard, Hurghada
- Abu Tig Marina, El Gouna, Hurghada
- San Stefano Marina, Alexandria
- Porto Marina
- Porto Sokhna
- Marsa El-geezah
- Sidi Abdel Rahman
- Ras Gharib

== France ==
=== Mediterranean coast ===
==== Côte d'Azur (French Riviera) ====
- Port Vauban, Antibes (largest marina in the Mediterranean by total tonnage)
- Vieux Port de Cannes, Cannes
- Port Pierre Canto, Cannes
- Port Camille Rayon, Golfe-Juan
- Port Gallice, Antibes
- Marina Baie des Anges, Villeneuve-Loubet
- Port de Saint-Tropez, Saint-Tropez
- Marines de Cogolin, Cogolin
- Port de Nice, Nice
- Port de Beaulieu-sur-Mer, Beaulieu-sur-Mer
- Port de Cap-d'Ail, Cap-d'Ail
- Port de Garavan, Menton
- Port Fréjus, Fréjus
- Port Santa Lucia, Saint-Raphaël
- Port La Napoule, Mandelieu-la-Napoule

==== Provence and Languedoc ====
- Vieux-Port de Marseille, Marseille
- Port de Bandol, Bandol
- Port du Lavandou, Le Lavandou
- Port de la Darse Nord, Toulon
- IGY Marina Sète, Sète
- Port Camargue, Le Grau-du-Roi (one of the largest marinas in Europe)
- Port de Port-Vendres, Port-Vendres
- Port de La Ciotat, La Ciotat

==== Corsica ====
- Port de Calvi, Calvi
- Port de Bonifacio, Bonifacio
- Port Tino Rossi, Ajaccio
- Port de Porto-Vecchio, Porto-Vecchio
- Port de Saint-Florent, Saint-Florent

=== Atlantic coast ===
- Port de plaisance de La Rochelle, La Rochelle (largest marina in Europe)
- Port Olona, Les Sables-d'Olonne
- Port Grimaud, Grimaud
- Port de plaisance d'Arcachon, Arcachon
- Port de plaisance de Royan, Royan
- Port de plaisance d'Hendaye, Hendaye
- Bassins à Flot, Bordeaux

=== Brittany and Normandy ===
- Port du Moulin Blanc, Brest
- Port du Château, Brest
- Port du Crouesty, Arzon
- Port de La Trinité-sur-Mer, La Trinité-sur-Mer
- Port de plaisance de Lorient, Lorient
- Port de Concarneau, Concarneau
- Port de Saint-Malo, Saint-Malo
- Port de plaisance de Cherbourg, Cherbourg
- Port de plaisance de Deauville, Deauville
- Port de Granville, Granville
- Port de Vannes, Vannes

=== English Channel ===
- Port de plaisance de Dunkerque, Dunkirk
- Port de plaisance de Calais, Calais
- Port de plaisance de Boulogne-sur-Mer, Boulogne-sur-Mer
- Port de plaisance de Dieppe, Dieppe
- Port de plaisance du Havre, Le Havre

== Finland ==
- Kuopio Marina, Kuopio

== Germany ==
(number of spots for ships added)

=== Brandenburg ===
- Hohen Neuendorf – Marina Havelbaude
- Rheinsberg (Kleinzerlang) – Marina Wolfsbruch, 190 spots for vessels

=== Berlin ===
- Bootsstände Angermann, 250
- Marina Lanke, 270
- Verein Seglerhaus am Wannsee

=== Baden-Württemberg ===
- Kressbronn am Bodensee – Ultramarin, 1500

=== Bavaria ===
- Bernried – Marina Bernried, 270

=== Marinas in Hesse ===
- Wiesbaden – Schiersteiner Hafen

=== Hamburg ===
- Yachthafen – 2000

=== Mecklenburg & Western Pomerania ===
- Hohe Düne, Rostock – Yachthafen Hohe Düne, 750
- Kühlungsborn – Bootshafen|
- Rechlin – Marina Müritz (Hafendorf Müritz), 350
- Stralsund – Citymarina Stralsund, 300
- Usedom – Yachthafen Karlshagen
- Warnemünde (Rostock) – Dalben 21
- Warnemünde – Schnatermann
- Wolgast – Dreilindengrund

=== Lower Saxony ===
- Emden – Yachthafen "Alter Binnenhafen/Ratsdelft", 100
- Emden – Yachthafen "Außenhafen Emden", 60
- Hannover – Yachthafen Hannover

=== Northrhine-Westphalia ===
- Bergkamen – Marina Rünthe, 280
- Duisburg – Marina, 133
- Emmerich am Rhein – Porta Marina, 420
- Leverkusen – Yacht-Club Leverkusen-Hitdorf e.V., 50
- Köln-Zündorf – Groov
- Recke (Westfalen) – Marina Recke, Mittellandkanal
- Wesel – Yachthafen

=== Schleswig-Holstein ===
- Bohnert – Marina Hülsen, 68
- Fehmarn – Burg auf Fehmarn
- Flensburg – Museumshafen Flensburg
- Heiligenhafen – Marina Heiligenhafen, 1000
- Helgoland – Yachthafen
- Kiel – Sport harbours at Kieler Förde, 2200
- Laboe (Kiel) – Yachthafen
- Lübeck – Marina Baltica, 210
- Neustadt in Holstein – ancora Marina
- Sylt – Hafen Rantum
- Timmendorfer Strand – Niendorfer Hafen
- Uetersen – Klosterdeich/Stichhafen

== Greece ==
In Greece there are a total of 50 marinas operating and 20 more are under construction.

=== Athens Metropolitan Area ===
- Agios Kosmas Marina, Hellinikon, Attica
- Alimos Marina, Alimos, Attica
- Athens Marina (formerly Faliro Marina), Phaleron, Attica
- Flisvos Marina, Piraeus, Attica
- Vouliagmeni Marina, Vouliagmeni, Attica
- Glyfada Marinas (Glyfada Marina A, Glyfada Marina B, Glyfada Marina C), Glyfada, Attica
- Methana Marina, Methana, Attica
- Olympic Marine, Lavrio, Attica
- Marina Zea, Piraeus, Attica
- Marina Tzitzifies, Kallithea, Attica
- Schoinias Marina, Schoinias, Attica

=== Crete ===
- Agios Nikolaos Marina, Agios Nikolaos, Crete
- Herakleion Marina, Herakleion, Crete
- Chania Marina, Chania, Crete
- Elounda Marina, Elounda, Greece
- Rethymnon Marina, Rethymnon, Crete
- Souda Marina, Souda, Crete

=== Cyclades ===
- Tinos Marina, Tinos

=== Dodecanese ===
- Lakki Marina, Leros
- Rhodes Marina

=== Ionian Islands ===
- Marina of Lefkas, Lefkas

=== Macedonia ===
- Kalamaria Marina, Kalamaria, Thessaloniki
- Nautical Club of Thessaloniki, Kalamaria, Thessaloniki
- Nea Krini, Kalamaria, Thessaloniki
- Sailing Club of Thessaloniki, Thessaloniki
- Porto Carras, Chalkidiki
- Kavala Marina, Kavala

=== Peloponnese ===
- Kalamata Marina, Kalamata
- Marina of Patras, Patras

== Ireland — whole island ==
Sailing south from NE corner of island:

=== East Coast ===
- Carrickfergus Marina
- Bangor Marina
- Copeland Marina
- Ardglass Marina (also known as Phennick Cove Marina)
- Portaferry Marina
- Carlingford Marina
- Malahide Marina, Dublin
- Howth Yacht Club Marina, Dublin
- Pool Beg Marina, Dublin
- Dublin City Moorings
- Dun Laoghaire Marina, Dublin
- Arklow Marina, County Wicklow

=== South Coast ===
- Kilmore Quay, County Wexford
- Waterford City Marina, Waterford
- Three Sisters Marina, New Ross, County Wexford Upriver/Inland
- Salve Marina, Crosshaven, County Cork
- Crosshaven Boatyard Marina, County Cork
- Royal Cork Yacht Club Marina, Cork
- Cork Harbour Marina (Monkstown Marina), Monkstown Cork
- Castlepark Marina, Kinsale, County Cork
- Trident Marina, Kinsale, County Cork
- East Ferry Marina, Great Island, County Cork
- Kinsale Marina, Kinsale, County Cork

=== West Coast ===
- Cahersiveen Marina, Cahersiveen, County Kerry
- Lawrence's Cove Marina, Bere Island, County Cork
- Dingle Marina, Dingle, County Kerry
- Fenit Marina, Tralee, County Kerry
- Kilrush Marina, Kilrush, County Clare
- Galway Harbour Marina, Galway

=== River Shannon and inland marinas ===
- Athlone Marina
- Hanley's Marina, Lanesborough
- Shamrock Marina Esker Banagher

=== North Coast ===
- Lough Swilly Marina
- Ballycastle Marina
- Glenarm Marina
- Portrush Marina
- Rathlin Island Marina
- Coleraine Marina
- Seatons Marina
- Foyle Marina

== India ==
- Kochi International Marina

== Indonesia ==
- Nongsa Point Marina (Batam)

Marina Del Ray (Gili Gede, Lombok)

== Israel ==
=== Mediterranean Sea ===
- Blue Marina, Ashdod
- Ashqelon
- Herzliya
- Tel-Aviv
- Haifa
- Akko

=== Red Sea ===
- Eilat

== Hong Kong ==
=== Hong Kong Island ===
- Royal Hong Kong Yacht Club, Causeway Bay (branches at Middle Island & Shelter Cove)
- Aberdeen Boat Club, Sham Wan, Aberdeen Harbour (buoy moorings only, branch at Middle Island)
- Aberdeen Marina Club, Sham Wan

=== New Territories ===
- Discovery Bay Marina Club, Nim Shue Wan, Discovery Bay, Lantau Island
- Club Marina Cove, Ho Chung, Sai Kung District
- Hong Kong Marina, Pak Wai, Sai Kung District
- Hebe Haven Yacht Club, Pak Sha Wan, Sai Kung (buoy moorings only)
- Clear Water Bay Golf & Country Club Marina, Po Toi O, near Clear Water Bay
- Gold Coast Yacht & Country Club Marina, Tuen Mun District

== Lebanon ==
- Zaitunay Bay, Beirut
- La Marina, Dbayeh
- El Mina
- ATCL Marina, Kaslik, Jounieh
- Tripoli

== Malaysia ==
- Miri Marina
- Perak Marina (Marina Island Pangkor)
- Sebana Cove Resort Marina
- Puteri Harbour Marina
- Senibong Cove Marina
- Straits Quay, Penang
- Tanjung City Marina, Penang

== Malta ==
- Grand Harbour Marina, Vittoriosa Marina, Vittoriosa
- Manoel Island Marina
- Mġarr Harbour Marina, Għajnsielem, Gozo
- Msida Marina, Msida
- Portomaso Marina, St Julian's

== Mexico ==
- Marina Nuevo Vallarta
- Puerto Salina

== Montenegro ==
Porto Montenegro, Tivat

== Netherlands ==
- Zeewolde – Jachthaven De Eemhof
- Jachthaven Biesbosch,

== New Zealand ==
=== Opua ===
- Opua Marina, Bay of Islands

=== Whangarei ===
- Whangarei Marina

=== Auckland ===
- Bayswater Marina
- Clearwater Cove
- Gulf Harbour Marina
- Half Moon Bay Marina
- Hobsonville Marina
- Westhaven Marina, biggest marina of the Southern Hemisphere

=== Whitianga ===
- Whitianga Marina, Coromandel

=== Tauranga ===
- Harbour Bridge Marina
- Tauranga Marina, Sulphur Point

=== Gisborne ===
- Gisborne Tatapouri Sports Fishing Club

=== Napier ===
- Napier Sailing Club Inc.

=== Port Nicholson, Wellington ===
- Chaffers Marina, Wellington City
- Evans Bay Marina, Wellington
- Seaview Marina, Lower Hutt

=== Mana ===
- Mana Marina, Paremata, Wellington

=== Marlborough Sounds ===
- Havelock Marina, Havelock
- Picton Marina
- Waikawa Bay Marina, nr Picton

=== Nelson ===
- Nelson Marina

=== Lyttelton Harbour (for Christchurch) ===
- Try Lyttelton Port

=== Dunedin ===
- Otago Yacht Club
- Port Chalmers Yacht Club

== Philippines ==
- Abanico Yacht Club Puerto Princesa
- Bohol Yacht Club
- Busuanga Yacht Club Coron, Palawan
- Cebu Yacht Club
- Davao Boat and Leisure Club
- Iloilo Sailing Club
- Manila Yacht Club
- Maya Maya Yacht Club Nasugbu, Batangas
- Puerto Galera Yacht Club
- Punta Fuego Yacht Club
- Santa Ana Yacht Club Santa Ana, Cagayan
- Subic Bay Yacht Club
- Taal Lake Yacht Club
- The Boat Club Iloilo

== Poland ==
- Gdynia – Biggest Marina in Poland.
- Gdańsk
- Hel
- Łeba
- Puck
- Szczecin
- Trzebież
- Władysławowo
- Wrocław

== Portugal ==
- Azores
  - Angra do Heroísmo (Terceira Island)
  - Horta (Faial Island) – 4th most visited marina in the world
  - Ponta Delgada (São Miguel Island)
  - Praia (Graciosa Island)
  - Praia da Vitória (Terceira Island)
  - Velas (São Jorge Island)
  - Vila Franca do Campo (São Miguel Island)
  - Vila do Porto (Santa Maria Island)
- Albufeira – Marina de Albufeira
- Cascais – Cascais Marina
- Lagos – Marina de Lagos
- Lisbon – Marina Parque das Nações Portugal
- Nazaré – Marina Clube Naval da Nazaré
- Porto - Marina de Leixões
- Porto - Marina da Póvoa
- Porto - Marina do Freixo
- Porto - Douro Marina
- Portimão – Maria de Portimão
- Vilamoura – Marina de Vilamoura

== Romania ==
- Limanu

== Singapore ==
- Marina at Keppel Bay (Singapore)

== Slovenia ==
- Marina Izola
- Marina Koper
- Marina Portorož

== Spain ==
- Empuriabrava

== Thailand ==
- Ocean Marina Yacht Club, Pattaya
- Phuket Boat Lagoon, Phuket
- Royal Phuket Marina, Phuket
- Phuket Yacht Haven

== Turkey and Northern Cyprus ==
- Antalya Province
  - Setur Antalya Marina, Antalya
  - Setur Finike Marina, Finike
  - Park Kemer Marina, Kemer
- Aydın Province
  - D-Marin Didim, Didim
  - Setur Kuşadası Marina, Kuşadası
- Balıkesir Province
  - Setur Ayvalık Marina, Ayvalık
- Istanbul Province
  - Ataköy Marina, Ataköy – Bakırköy (Istanbul, European part)
  - Setur Kalamış & Fenerbahçe Marina, Kalamış and Fenerbahçe (two adjacent marinas) – Kadıköy (Istanbul, Asian part)
  - Viaport Marina, Tuzla – Tuzla (Istanbul, Asian part)
- İzmir Province
  - Alaçatı Marina, Alaçatı, Çeşme
  - Setur Çeşme Altınyunus Marina, Çeşme
  - Levent İzmir Marina, İnciraltı, İzmir
- Muğla Province
  - Palmarina Bodrum, Yalıkavak – Bodrum
  - Club Marina, Göcek – Fethiye
  - Port Göcek, Göcek – Fethiye
  - Fethiye Ece Marina, Fethiye
  - Milta Bodrum Marina, Bodrum
  - Port Bodrum Yalıkavak, Yalıkavak – Bodrum
  - Port Atami, Göltürkbükü – Bodrum
  - D-Marin Turgutreis, Turgutreis – Bodrum
  - Marmaris Netsel Marina, Marmaris
  - Marmaris Yatmarin, Marmaris
  - Albatros Marina, Marmaris
  - Martı Marina, Marmaris
- Northern Cyprus
  - Girne Marina, Girne (Kyrenia)
  - Delta Marina, Gazimağusa (Famagusta)

== United Arab Emirates ==
=== Dubai ===
- Dubai Marina
- Alkhor Marina – under construction

== United Kingdom ==
=== Suffolk, East Anglia ===
- Fambridge Yacht Haven, River Crouch
- Port of Lowestoft (marina)
- Woolverstone Marina

=== South Coast ===
- Brighton Marina
- Burnham Yacht Harbour
- Chichester Marina
- Cobb's Quay Marina
- Eastbourne
- Gosport Marina
- Hamble Point Marina
- Haslar Marina
- Haven Quay Lymington Dry Stack
- Hythe Marina Village
- Island Harbour Marina
- Littlehampton Marina
- Lymington Berthon
- Lymington Harbour Master
- Lymington Yacht Haven
- Mercury Yacht Harbour
- Northney Marina
- Ocean Village Marina
- Port Hamble Marina
- Port Solent
- Portland Marina
- Ramsgate
- Saxon Wharf
- Shamrock Quay
- Smedley Marina
- Southsea Marina
- Sovereign Harbour
- Sparkes Marina
- Tewkesbury Marina
- Thornham Marina
- Weymouth and Portland National Sailing Academy
- Weymouth Marina
- WicorMarine Yacht Haven

=== London ===
- Gallions Point Marina
- Limehouse Marina
- South Dock Marina
- St Katherine Haven
- West India Docks Marina

Non-tidal Thames

- Bourne End Marina
- Bray Marina
- Eyot House Marina
- Hambleden Mill Marina
- Penton Hook Marina
- Racecourse Marina
- Shepperton Marina
- Teddington Harbour
- Thames Ditton Marina
- Thames and Kennet Marina
- Walton Marina
- Windsor Marina

Thames Estuary

- Embankment Marina
- Leigh Marina

River Medway

- Chatham Maritime Marina
- Gillingham Marina
- Hoo Marina
- Medway Bridge Marina
- Port Medway Marina
- Whitton Marine

Non-tidal Medway

- Fords Wharf Boatyard
- Hampstead Marina
- Medway Wharf Marina

=== Inland ===
- Apsley Marina, Grand Union Canal
- Cowroast Marina, Grand Union Canal
- Crick Marina, Grand Union Canal
- Bredon Marina, River Avon
- Priory Marina, River Great Ouse
- Royal Quays Marina, River Tyne
- Springfield Marina, River Lea

=== South West England ===
- Bristol Harbour Marina
- Brixham Marina
- Exmouth Marina
- Falmouth Marina (operated by Premier Marinas)
- Mylor Harbour Marina
- Plymouth Yacht Haven
- Portishead Marina
- Queen Anne's Battery
- Torquay Marina
- Watchet Harbour Marina
- Portland Marina
- Weymouth Marina
- Yacht Haven Quay Plymouth

=== Northern England ===
- Barrow Marina, Barrow-in-Furness
- Hartlepool Marina, Hartlepool
- Hull Marina, Kingston upon Hull
- Liverpool Marina, Liverpool
- Maryport Marina, Maryport
- Sunderland Marina, Sunderland

=== Wales ===
- Aberystwyth Marina, Aberystwyth
- Burry Port Marina, Burry Port
- Cardiff Marina, Cardiff
- Conwyn Marina, Conwy
- Fishguard & Goodwick Marina, Fishguard (proposed)
- Hafan Pwllheli, Pwllheli
- Holyhead Marina, Holyhead
- Lawrenny Quay Hotel & Yacht Station, Kilgetty
- Mermaid Quay, Cardiff
- Neyland Yacht Haven, Neyland
- Pembroke Marina, Pembroke
- Penarth Marina, Vale of Glamorgan
- Swansea Marina, Swansea

=== Northern Ireland ===
- Ardglass Marina, Ardglass
- Bangor Marina
- Belfast Lough
- Belfast Marina
- Carrickfergus Marina
- Portaferry Marina, Strangford Lough

=== Scotland ===
==== Firth of Clyde ====
- Clyde Marina, Ardrossan, Firth of Clyde, Scotland
- Holy Loch Marina, Sandbank, Holy Loch
- Kip Marina, Inverkip
- Largs Yacht Haven, Largs
- Portavadie Marina, Loch Fyne
- Port Bannatyne Marina, Port Bannatyne
- Stranraer West Pier Marina, Stranraer
- Troon Yacht Haven, Troon

==== Firth of Forth ====
- Port Edgar Marina, Firth of Forth

==== Other Areas ====
- Ardfern Marina, Loch Craignish
- Craobh Marina, Loch Linnhe

=== Channel Islands ===
- Beaucette Marina, Guernsey
- Elizabeth Marina, Jersey
- La Collette Marina, Jersey
- Saint Helier Marina, Jersey

== United States ==
=== California ===
- Woodley Island Marina, Humboldt Bay, Eureka
- Downtown Shoreline Marina, Long Beach
- Alamitos Bay Marina, Long Beach
- Rainbow Harbor, Long Beach
- Cerritos Bahia Marina, Long Beach
- Marina Pacifica Boat Slips, Long Beach
- Harborlight Landing At West Coast Hotel, Long Beach
- Bar Harbor Anchorage, Marina del Rey
- Bay Club Apartments & Marina, Marina del Rey
- BoatYard Marina, Marina del Rey
- Catalina Yacht Anchorage, Marina del Rey
- Del Rey Yacht Club, Marina del Rey
- Dock 77, Marina del Rey
- Dolphin Marina, Marina del Rey
- Holiday Harbor Marina, Marina del Rey
- Marina City Club, Marina del Rey
- Marina Harbor Apartments & Anchorage, Marina del Rey
- Pier 44, Marina del Rey
- Santa Monica Windjammers YC Marina, Marina del Rey
- Tahiti Marina Apartments and Marina, Marina del Rey
- Villa Del Mar Marina, Marina del Rey
- Monterey Marina, Monterey
- Newport Harbor, Newport Beach
- Pier 39 Marina, San Francisco
- Clipper Yacht Harbor, Sausalito
- Channel Islands Marina, Ventura County
- Marina Bay, Richmond
- Berkeley Marina, Berkeley
- Westpoint Harbor, Redwood City
- Shelter Island Marina, San Diego

=== Connecticut ===
- Cedar Island Marina
- Deep River Marina

=== Florida ===
- Angler's Marina, Clewiston
- Bayshore Gardens Marina, Bayshore Gardens
- Bahia Mar Yachting Center, Fort Lauderdale
- Bird Key Yacht Club, Sarasota
- Bradenton Beach Marina, Bradenton Beach
- Cut's Edge Harbor Marina, Palmetto
- Fisherman's Wharf Marina, Venice
- Fort Myers Yacht Basin, Fort Myers
- Hall of Fame Marina, Fort Lauderdale
- Marina Jack's, Sarasota
- Miami Beach Marina, Miami
- Haulover Beach Park Marina, Miami
- Longboat Key Club Moorings, Longboat Key
- Loggerhead Club & Marina, Daytona Beach
- Loggerhead Club & Marina, St. Pete Beach
- Loggerhead Club & Marina, Lake Okeechobee
- Loggerhead Club & Marina, Vero Beach
- Loggerhead Club & Marina, Stuart
- Loggerhead Club & Marina, Jupiter
- Loggerhead Club & Marina, Palm Beach Gardens
- Loggerhead Club & Marina, Riviera
- Loggerhead Club & Marina, Lantana
- Loggerhead Club & Marina, Hollywood
- Loggerhead Club & Marina, S. Lantana
- Loggerhead Club & Marina, Aventura
- Loggerhead Club & Marina, South Miami
- Palm View Marina, Rubonia
- Riviera Dunes Marina, Palmetto
- Safe Harbor Regatta Pointe, Palmetto
- Sarasota Yacht Club, Sarasota
- St Petersburg Municipal Marina, St Petersburg
- Tarpon Marina, Venice
- The Tarpon Club Marina, Naples
- The Tierra Verde Marina, Tierra Verde
- Tropic Isles Marina, Palmetto
- Twin Dolphin Marina, Bradenton

=== Georgia ===
*Brunswick Landing Marina

- Florence Marina State Park

=== Kentucky ===
- Ludlow-Bromley Yacht Club, Ludlow

=== Maryland ===
- Baltimore Boating Center, Essex, Maryland|Essex
- City Yacht Basin, Havre de Grace
- Havre de Grace Marina, Havre de Grace
- Log Pond Marina, Havre de Grace
- Penn's Beach Marina, Havre de Grace
- Sunset Harbor Marina, Essex
- Tidewater Marina, Havre de Grace

=== Massachusetts ===
- New Bedford, Massachusetts
- Marina Bay (Quincy, Massachusetts)
- Newburyport Marinas (Newburyport, Massachusetts)

=== Michigan ===
- Drummond Island Yacht Haven, Drummond Island
- George Kemp Marina, Sault Ste. Marie
- Bay Harbor Marina, Bay City
- Duncan Clinch Marina, Traverse City
- Tri-Centennial State Park, Detroit (Detroit River)
- Riverview Resort and Marina, Barbeau
- Dewitt Marine, Bellaire

=== Minnesota ===
- Watergate Marina, Saint Paul

=== Missouri ===
- Lodge of Four Seasons Marina
- Mutton Creek Marina and Campgrounds, Greenfield

=== New Jersey ===
- Allen's Dock, New Gretna
- Fair Lawn Marina, Fair Lawn
- Frank S. Farley State Marina, Atlantic City
- Green Cove Marina, Brick

=== New York ===
- 79th Street Boat Basin, Manhattan
- Erie Basin Marina, Buffalo
- World's Fair Marina, Queens
- Anglers' Bay Marina, Cleveland, New York
- North Cove Marina, Manhattan

=== Ohio ===
- Forest City Yacht Club
- Battery Park Marina
- Cedar Point

=== Oklahoma ===
- Alberta Creek Resort & Marina, Kingston

=== Oregon ===
- Pier 39 Marina, Astoria
- Port of Astoria Marina, Astoria
- Port of Bandon, Bandon
- Port of Brookings Harbor, Brookings
- Charleston Marina, Charleston
- Cove Palisades Marina (Lake Billy Chinook)
- Port of The Dalles, The Dalles
- Detroit Lake Marina, Detroit
- West Lake Resort, Florence
- Garibaldi Marina, Garibaldi
- Jot's Resort, Gold Beach
- Hood River Yacht Club, Hood River
- Portland
  - Columbia Crossings
  - Columbia Ridge Marina
  - Sundance Yacht Marina
- Jetty Fishery Marina, Rockaway
- McCuddy's Marina, Scappoose
- Loon Lake Watersports & Marina, Reedsport

=== Pennsylvania ===
- Seven Points Marina, Raystown Lake, near Huntingdon

=== Puerto Rico ===
- Puerto Del Rey Marina
- Club Deportivo del Oeste
- Club Náutico de Ponce

=== Rhode Island ===
- Brewer Cove Haven Marina

=== Texas ===
- Corpus Christi Marina, Corpus Christi
- Sea Ranch Marina, South Padre Island

=== Virgin Islands ===
- Yacht Haven Grande, Saint Thomas, USVI
- Crown Bay Marina, Saint Thomas, USVI

=== Virginia ===
- Washington Sailing Marina, Alexandria
- Smith Mountain Lake
  - Crystal Shores, Bedford County
  - Halesford Harbour, Bedford County
  - Parkway Marina, Bedford County

=== Washington ===
- Arabella's Landing Marina
- Cap Sante Marina, Anacortes
- Carillon Point Marina
- Squalicum Harbor Marina, Bellingham
- Blaine
  - Blaine Harbor Marina
  - Semiahmoo Marina
- Eagle Harbor Marina
- Port of Edmonds, Edmonds
- Everett Bayside Marine, Everett
- La Conner Marina
- Port of Kalama, Kalama
- Twin Bridges Marina, Mount Vernon
- Makah Marina, Neah Bay
- Oak Harbor Marina, Oak Harbor
- Swantown Marina & Boatworks, Olympia
- Skyline Marina
- Port Ludlow Marina, Port Ludlow
- Port Orchard Marina, Port Orchard
- Point Roberts Marina Resort, Port Roberts, Point Roberts
- Port of Poulsbo, Poulsbo
- Port of Poulsbo, (Roche Harbor Resort & Marina), Roche
- Seattle
  - Port of Seattle
  - Bell Harbor Marina
  - Harbor Island Marina
  - Shilshole Bay Marina
  - Elliott Bay Marina
  - Elliott Bay Yachting Center
  - Salmon Bay Marina and Boat Sales
- John Wayne Marina, Sequim
- Breakwater Marina, Tacoma
- Chinook Landing Marina, Tacoma
- Zittel's Marina

=== Washington, D.C. ===
- Columbia Island Marina, Columbia Island
- Gangplank Marina, Washington Channel, Washington, D.C. (Southwest)
- James Creek Marina, Anacostia River, Washington, D.C. (Southwest)
- Washington Marina, Washington Channel, Washington, D.C. (Southwest)

=== Wisconsin ===
- Milwaukee
  - McKinley Marina

== See also ==
- List of seaports
