= Baja Mar =

Coordinates: 32.0167°N 116.8572°W

Baja Mar Bajamar
- Seaside resort
- Nicknames: The Pebble Beach South of the Border, Best of Baja
- Interactive map of Baja Mar
- Country: Mexico
- State: Baja California
- Municipality: Ensenada Municipality
- Founded: 1975

Area
  - Total: 2.5 sq mi (6.5 km^{2})
- Time zone: UTC−8 (PST)
  - Summer (DST): UTC−7 (PDT)
- Area code: 646

Baja Mar (or Bajamar) is a seaside resort community twenty minutes north of Ensenada and forty minutes south of Greater San Diego–Tijuana in Ensenada Municipality, Baja California, Mexico. The resort community is located just south of another gringo community, La Salina – host of the Puerto Salina marina.

== History ==
The idea of the resort at Baja Mar was developed in 1975 by Grupo Valcas, a resort developer. Planning, development and initial construction of what would become the Bajamar Ocean Front Golf Resort was begun by Grupo Valcas as well. The master infrastructure of the community was developed so that, unlike nearby cities, it would maintain underground basic utilities. The resort company also developed the first 18 holes of the master planned golf course network. The resort opened to the general public in July 1976 and has since been given the nickname of The Pebble Beach South of the Border. Further development of the resort occurred in 1991 when the original developer entered a partnership with another hotel and resort developer to complete the master planned property. Following the joint-ventured agreement the 81-room hotel of the resort was constructed in addition to the Oceanó golf course, one of three currently existing courses.

The Bajamar Ocean Front Golf Resort is currently owned by Grupo Mega Turismo, based in Mazatlan, Bay View Grand, and Grupo Valcas. Baja Mar itself has approximately 600 completed homes and a 15,000-square-foot (1,400 m^{2}) clubhouse, whilst maintaining guarded gates.

== Geography ==
Baja Mar lies on a rugged strip of coastline of the Baja California Gold Coast. The seaside resort faces west towards the Pacific Ocean and a highrise rounded cliff is located to its east.

== Economy ==
The economy of Baja Mar is heavily reliant on tourism.

== Tourism ==
Baja Mar features three golf courses at the Bajamar Ocean Front Golf Resort that include the renowned Oceanó, as well as the Vista and Lagos courses. North of the resort are popular surf breaks, Puerto Nuevo, and nearby Rosarito Beach.

== See also ==
- Baja Malibu
