= James McKnight (footballer) =

Irish association football player

Jimmy McKnight
- McKnight pictured in the Athletic News, September 8, 1913

Personal information
- Full name: James McKnight
- Date of birth: 2 May 1892
- Place of birth: Newtownards
- Date of death: 16 March 1920 (aged 27)
- Place of death: Belfast
- Height: 5 ft 7 in (1.70 m)
- Position: Forward

Senior career*
Years	Team	Apps	(Gls)
- Linfield Swifts
1907–1912	Glentoran		
1912	Preston North End	12	(2)
1912–13	Glentoran		
1913–14	Nottingham Forest	9	(0)
1914–1915	Belfast Celtic		
1915–1918	Distillery		
1918	Willowfield		

International career
1912–1913	Ireland Amateurs	2	(2)
- * Club domestic league appearances and goals

Jimmy McKnight (2 May 1892 – 16 March 1920) was an Irish footballer who played as a forward.

== Club career ==
McKnight was a prolific goalscorer for Glentoran's Second XI, including scoring against the first team to seal victory in the County Antrim Shield semi-final in March 1909 and would go on to score all three goals in the final against Cliftonville . As a more regular first team player in the 1909–10 season, McKnight scored 16 goals in 22 matches, the following season continuing to be part of the Glentoran side who won the League title as well as the City Cup and the County Antrim Shield.

After scoring 23 goals in 23 games by March 1912, McKnight moved to Preston North End for a fee of £1,100, scoring his only two goals for the club in successive matches against Liverpool and Sheffield United . Following Preston's relegation, McKnight returned to Ireland in October 1912, helping Glentoran to win the title, before returning to England with Nottingham Forest in May 1913. This spell was not a success, with McKnight failing to score in 9 appearances, although he did score in the FA Cup against Clapton Orient.

McKnight again returned to Ireland, joining Belfast Celtic and helping his side to the league title and a runners up spot in the Irish Cup in the 1914–15 season. A final honour came in 1916, whilst playing for Distillery, with the 1916 Belfast Charity Cup, with McKnight continuing to play for Distillery in the War-time League. In 1918 he joined Intermediate side Willowfield.

Across both his spells at Glentoran, McKnight scored 72 goals in 99 games in all competitions.

== International career ==
McKnight made two appearances for the Ireland national side, scoring in both his appearances against Scotland in the 1911–12 and 1912–13 British Home Championship.

== Lifesaving Award ==
During his spell with Nottingham Forest, McKnight was awarded a certificate of lifesaving by the Royal Humane Society after saving a boy from drowning in Ardglass Harbour whilst on holiday.

== Death ==
McKnight died at the age of 27 from pneumonia.
