= Erie Basin =

Erie Basin may refer to:

- Lake Erie Basin, the watershed of Lake Erie
- Western Basin of Lake Erie
- Erie Basin Marina in Buffalo, New York
- Erie Basin (Brooklyn), a man-made harbor in Red Hook, Brooklyn
- Erie Basin dry dock, former shipworking facilities at Erie Basin, Brooklyn
