= KTDC =

KTDC may refer to:

- Kerala Tourism Development Corporation
- Kwun Tong District Council, the district council for the Kwun Tong District in Hong Kong
- KTDC-LP, a low-power radio station (105.3 FM) licensed to Muscatine, Iowa, United States
