= La Salina =

La Salina may refer to:

- La Salina, Casanare, Colombia
- La Salina, Baja California, Mexico

== See also ==
- La Saline, Missouri, United States
