= Kilrush Marina =

Coordinates: 52°38′0.52″N 9°29′45.41″W

Kilrush Marina is a locked marina in Kilrush Harbour, Kilrush, County Clare, Ireland. It has a well equipped marina services building, with an extensive boatyard, including a large indoor boat storage and repair facility. Many boats from other leisure boating centres on the West Coast of Ireland winter in Kilrush. Originally funded by Shannon Development the marina has grown to be an integral part of the local economy. The marina is used as a base for day trips to Scattery Island and for Dolphin Watch cruises.

The marina is operated by Kilrush Marina Ltd, which is a wholly owned subsidiary company of L&M Keating Ltd.

The marina is located on the north side of the estuary of the River Shannon. The next marina to the south is Fenit Marina. For leisure craft, the next port of call, going north, is in the Aran Islands.

Kerry Head on the south side and Loop Head on the north are the limits of the Shannon Estuary Navigation control of the Shannon Estuary comes under the control of the Shannon Foynes Port Company

== See also ==
- List of marinas
