= Kochi International Marina =

Marina in Kochi, Kerala, India

Coordinates: 9.985567°N 76.267617°E

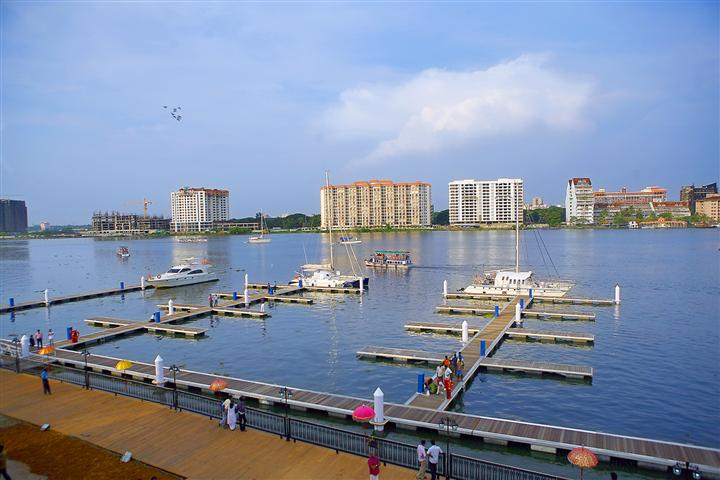
Kochi International Marina

The Kochi International Marina is a marina in the city of Kochi, in the state of Kerala, India. It is located in the eastern coast of the Mulavukad (one of the islands part of the city of Kochi), in the premises of the Bolgatty Palace.

The Kochi International Marina is the only international marina in India. It is owned by the Kerala Tourism Development Corporation.

== General description ==
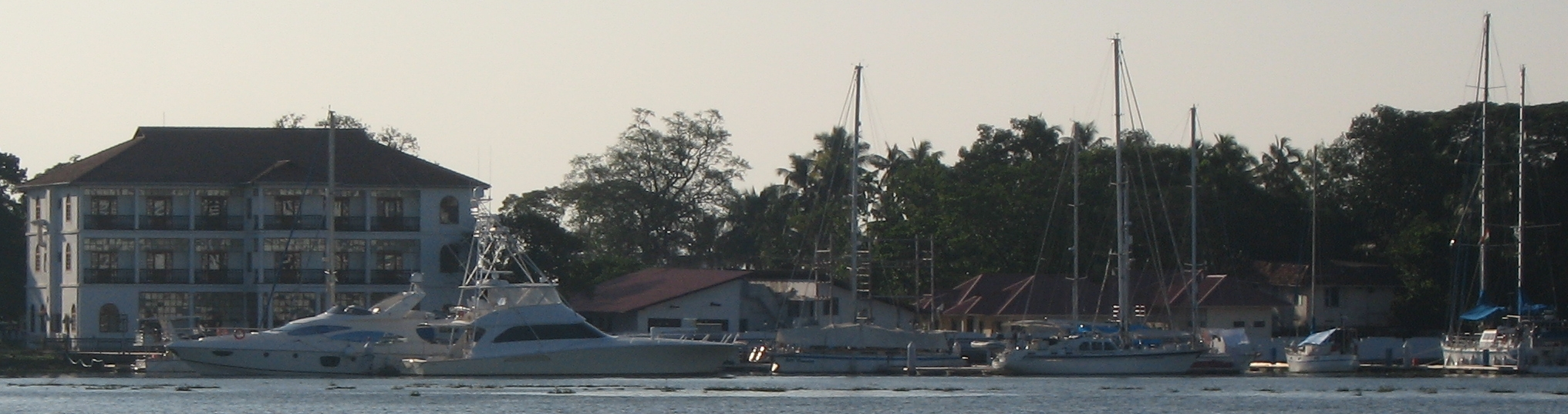
The Kochi Marina Jetty

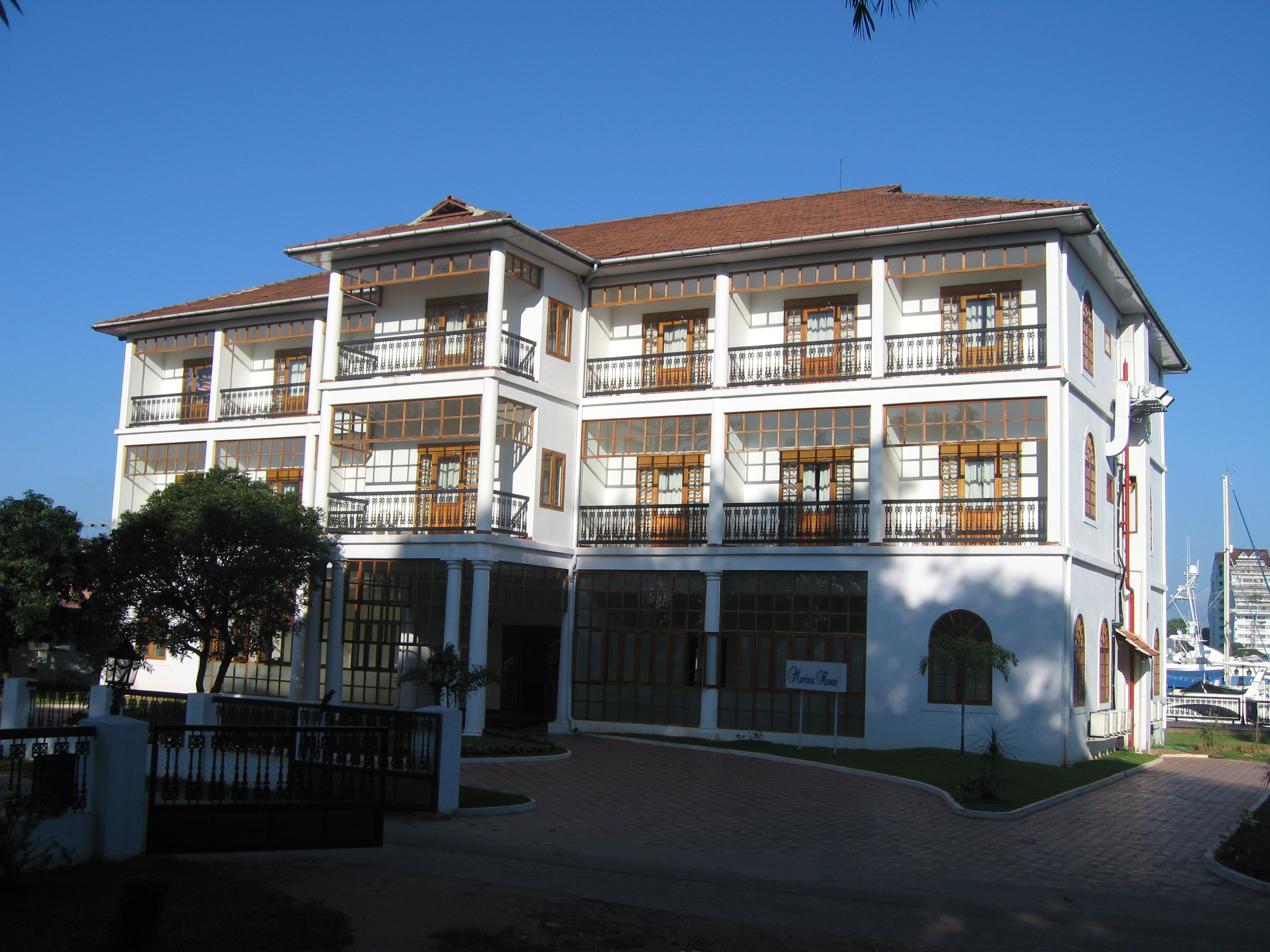
The Kochi Marina House

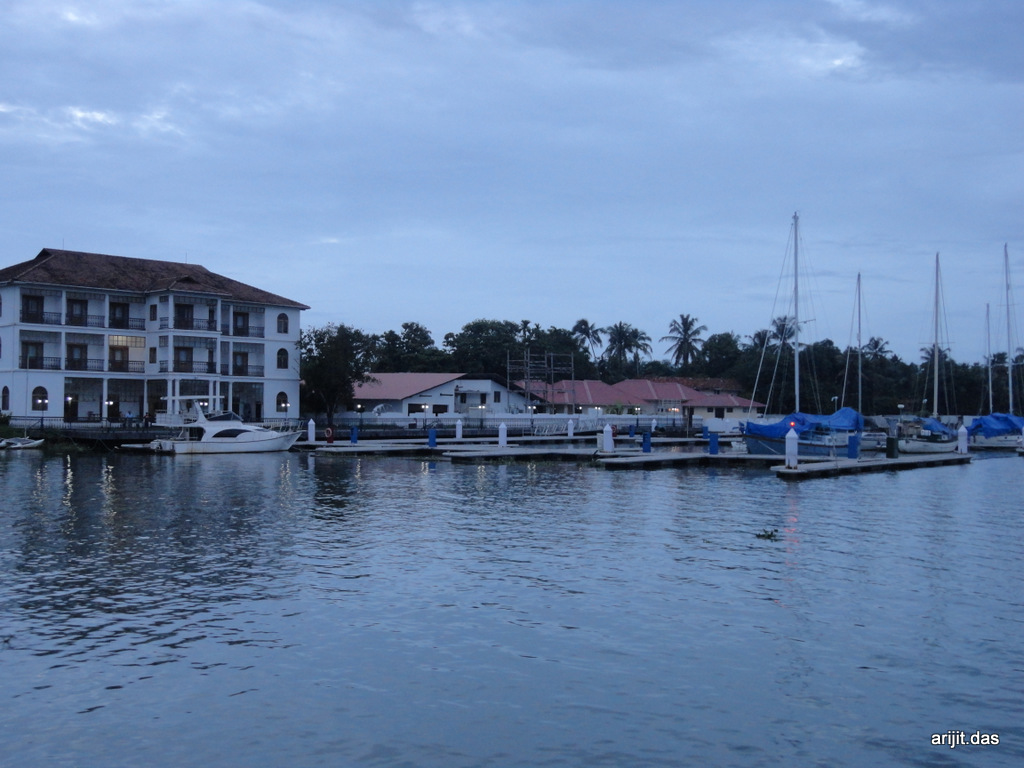
Kochi International Marina, Bolgatty Island

The Kochi International Marina started operations on 24 April 2010.

The Marina is owned and operated by KTDC. It was implemented by KITCO (Formerly Kerala Industrial and Technical Consultancy Organisation) for and on behalf of KTDC.

The Kochi Marina houses facility for berthing around 34 yachts. This will be further upgraded to 50 berths.

== See also ==
- List of marinas
