= Baja Malibu =

Beach in Baja California, Mexico

Baja Malibu also known as Malibu of Baja California is a beach and resort community in Tijuana Municipality, Baja California, named after Malibu in Los Angeles County, California. Located just 15 minutes from the San Diego border, the area is known for its gated communities, oceanfront homes, and luxurious coastal lifestyle. It is considered one of the more affluent coastal communities in Baja California.

The beach is a popular tourist destination within the San Diego–Tijuana metropolitan region and attracts surfers from across Southern California due to its well-known surf breaks. Baja Malibu is a must-visit destination for surfers of both intermediate and expert skill levels. The area features a sandy beach that can be enjoyed year-round. Certain secluded sections of the beach are known for adult nude and topless sunbathing, although visitors should be aware that public nudity is not officially permitted under local regulations.

== See also ==
- Playas de Tijuana
- Baja Mar
