= Mascot Hotel =

Hotel in Kerala, India

Coordinates: 8.509178°N 76.949867°E

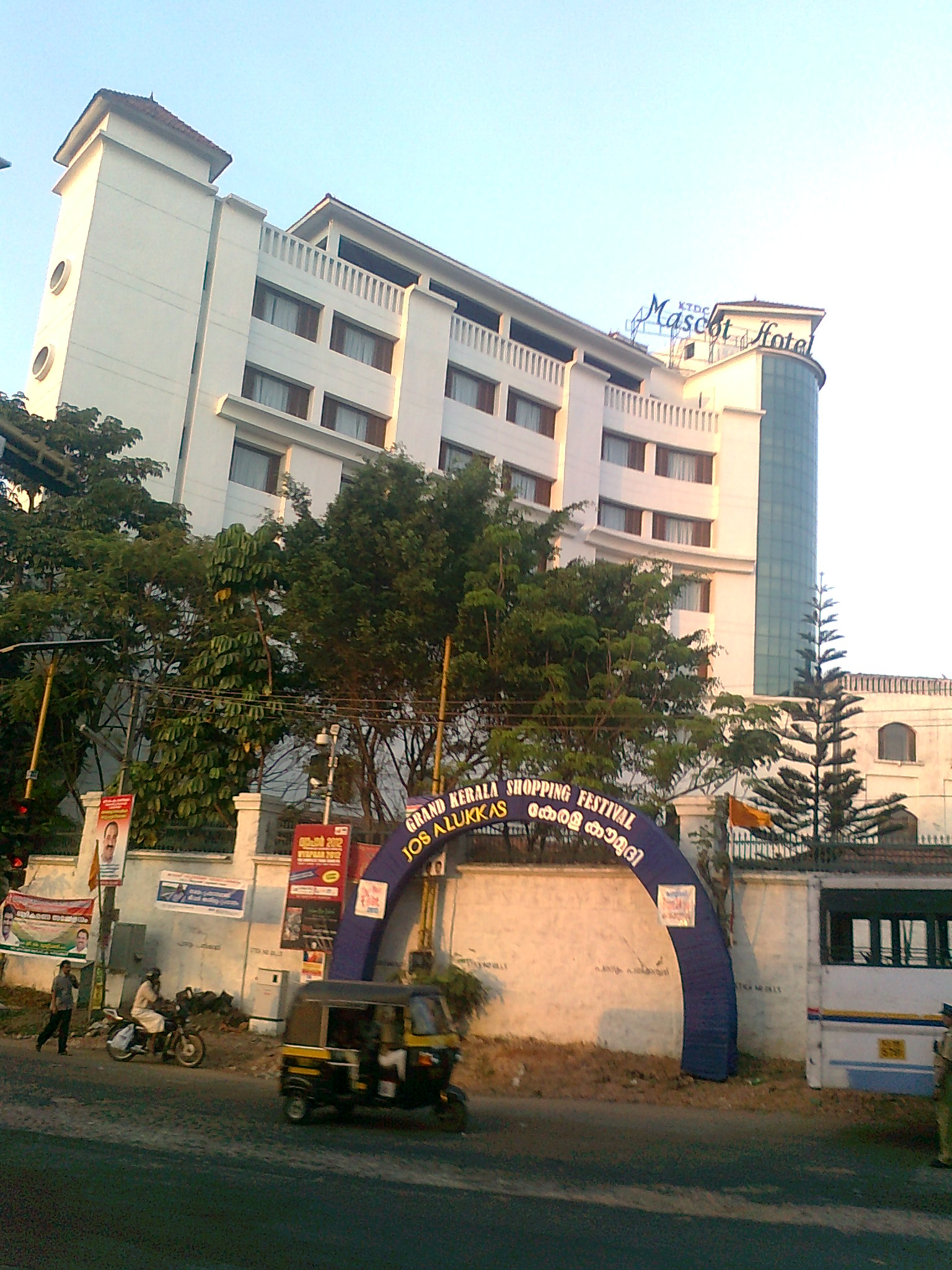
Roadside view of Mascot hotel

Mascot Hotel is a heritage business hotel owned by KTDC with five star status in Thiruvananthapuram, Kerala. The hotel offers large rooms with high ceilings due to its British era architectural design.

== History ==
The area where the Mascot Hotel is currently situated used to be the camp of the Travancore Army. The hotel was thereafter built in the area to accommodate officers of the British Army during World War I. Post war, the Travancore royal family starting using the hotel to welcome their guests. Later on KTDC took over the hotel, and till now, the hotel stands as a heritage location for tourists. It is the oldest star hotel of KTDC and is also considered the only heritage business hotel in Trivandrum.

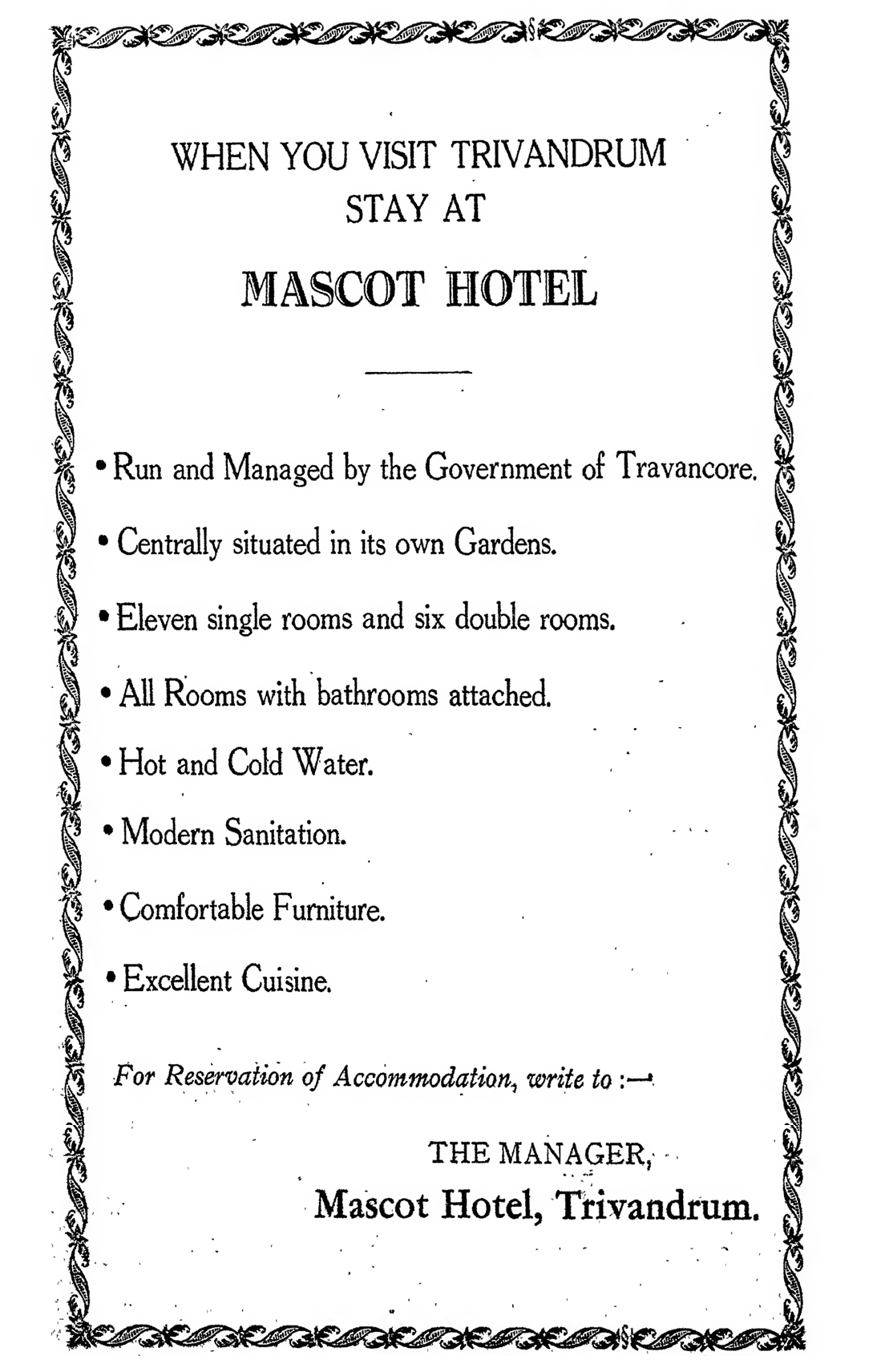
Advertisement of Mascot Hotel, Trivandrum, 1941

== Takeaway ==
In 2015, a takeaway section was opened in the Hotel.

== Centenary Celebrations ==
In 2019, the Hotel celebrated its centenary as five star status. A comprehensive project for the restoration of the heritage hotel was undertaken as part of the celebrations. The heritage block building, rooms, passages were strengthened along with the beautification of the premises, and improvement of various amenities. During the ICC Cricket World Cup 2019, Mascot Hotel had conducted a special screening of the matches for the guests at a special fare.
