= Erie Basin Marina =

Municipal inland harbor in Buffalo, NY

- Aerial view of the marina, August 2018

Location
- Country: United States
- Location: Buffalo, New York
- Coordinates: 42°52′53″N 78°53′27″W

Details
- Opened: 1974; 51 years ago
- Owned by: City of Buffalo
- Type of harbour: Artificial
- Size: c. 24 acres (9.7 ha)
- No. of berths: 286 slips (1999)
- Draft depth: 29 feet (8.8 m)

Statistics
- Website; Official website

The Erie Basin Marina is a municipal inland harbor in Buffalo, New York. The marina is primarily for residential usage, containing a large array of boat docks, gardens, and a public observatory overlooking the city and waterfront. The marina's harbor discharges into the Niagara River and Lake Erie.

Erie Basin Marina sits immediately south of the Black Rock Canal and the north of Buffalo's Inner Harbor and Naval Park area, where it is joined by a promenade walkway. It is protected by a long breakwall constructed and maintained by the United States Army Corps of Engineers. The harbor was designed to resemble an American buffalo when viewed from overhead.

== History ==
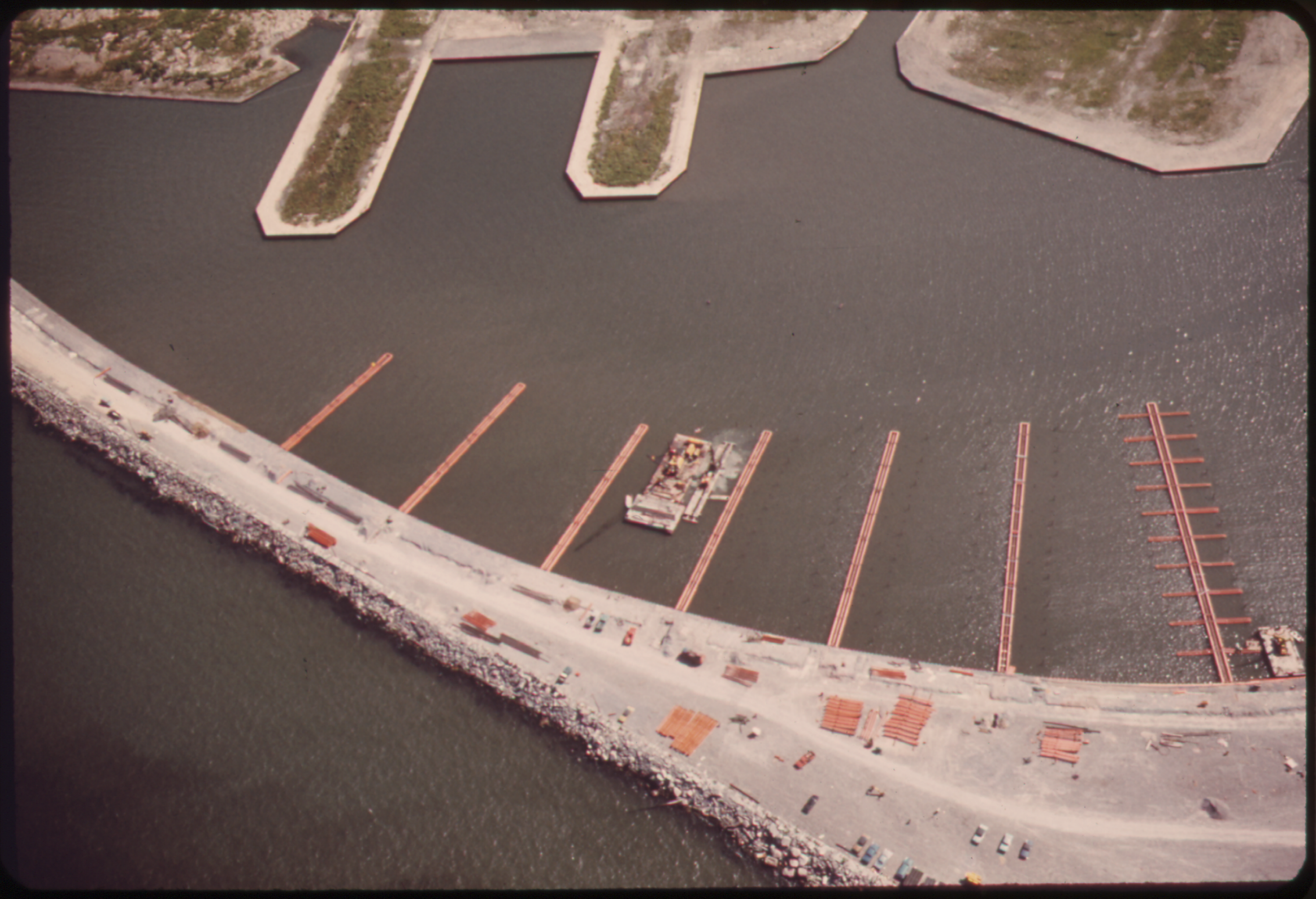
Marina under construction, July 1973

Before the marina was constructed, it was the site of the Erie Basin, one of two connections from Buffalo's Outer Harbor to the Erie Canal in the 19th and early 20th-centuries. The excavation occurred between 1848 and 1852, then protected by a seawall of stones, wood and gravel. Its entrance was the site of Buffalo's first waterfront grain elevator constructed by Joseph Dart. Later on, railroad tracks for Delaware, Lackawanna and Western Railroad were put in place in the same location, specifically for loading ships with coal ore.

It was reported that in 1900, a steamer owned by the Baltimore and Ohio Railroad, Columbia, was stolen by two tugboats from the basin on a June night.

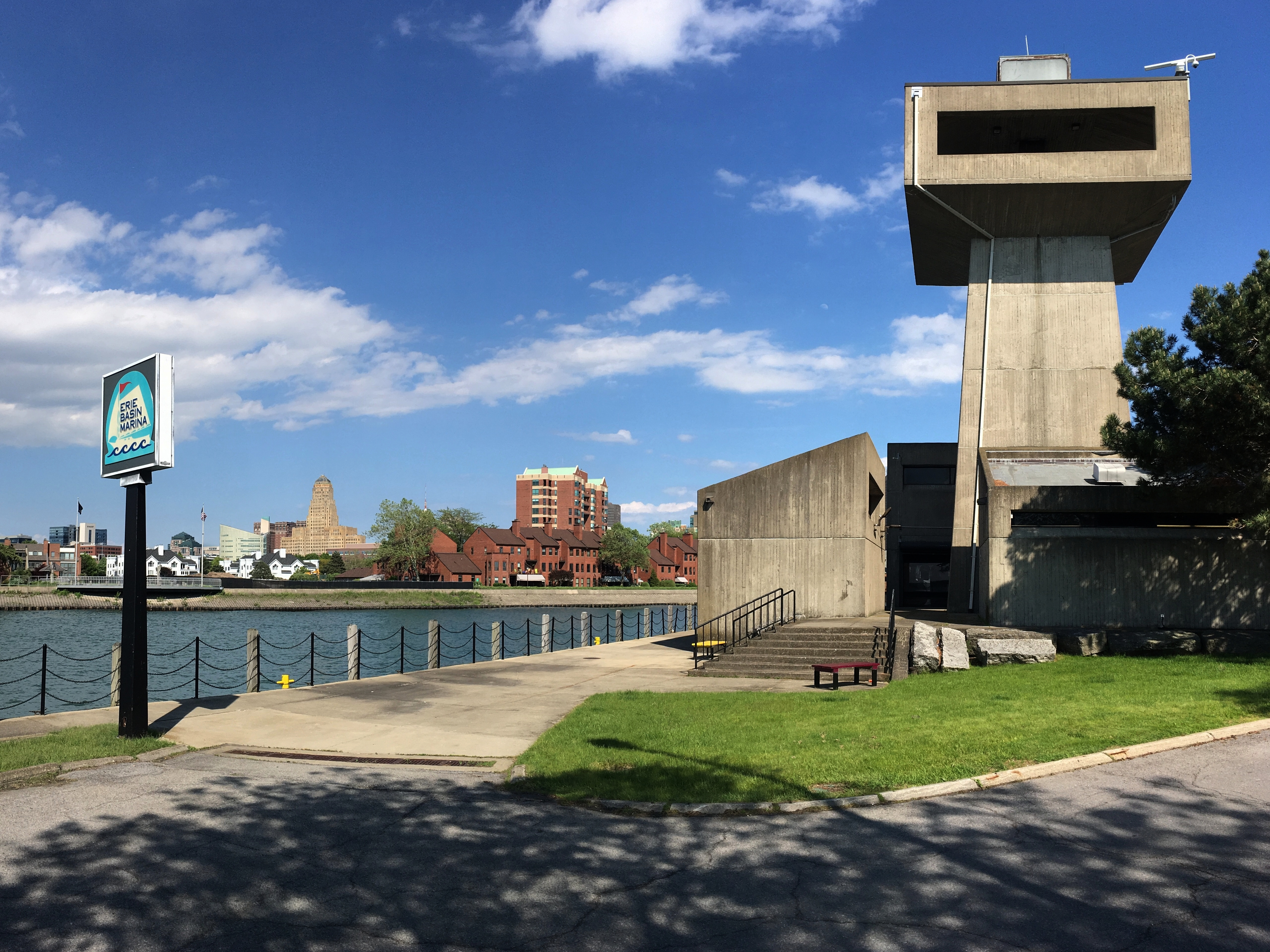
View of the Observation Tower, June 2019

Constructed began in the 1950s and was completed by 1974, from slag of Bethlehem and Republic Steel. When viewed from above, Erie Basin Marina has the shape of a buffalo, an intentional design feature paying homage to the city's metonym.

In recent years, contamination and sewage has become an issue for the harbor. The Niagara Frontier Transportation Authority, which operates the marina, routinely clears logs and debris from the marina inlet. In addition, 10 million gallons of city sewage overflows in 2010 was cut down to four million in 2017 after infrastructure improvements were completed.

$1 million was spent in 2010 on the reconstruction of the marina seawall, an extension of the boardwalk, and a concrete pier besides the observation tower. In 2013, developer Carl Paladino planned to construct a 14-story apartment complex at the entrance to the site. A new restaurant, William K's, opened in 2015, joining The Hatch at the marina.

== See also ==
- List of marinas
