= Club Deportivo del Oeste =

Private club in Cabo Rojo, Puerto Rico

- Interactive map of Club Deportivo del Oeste
- 18°05′59.99″N 67°11′20.16″W

Club information
- Location: Miradero, Cabo Rojo, Puerto Rico 00623
- Established: 1965
- Type: Private, member-owned
- Operator: Club Deportivo del Oeste Board of Directors
- Website: www.clubdeportivodeloeste.com

Club Deportivo del Oeste Golf Course
- Designed by: Jack Bender
- Par: 71
- Length: 6221

Club Deportivo del Oeste is a private club in Cabo Rojo, Puerto Rico which has the largest marina and one of only two golf courses in the Porta del Sol region of Puerto Rico.

== History ==
The Club Deportivo del Oeste was founded in 1965 by prominent professionals from Mayagüez, Cabo Rojo and other Municipalities from western Puerto Rico in Joyuda Barrio of Cabo Rojo.

Among its facilities are an eighteen hole golf course in approximately 120 acres (0.49 km^{2}) of land, its first hole is considered the hardest in all of Puerto Rico The course was designed by Jack Bender in 1965. The golf course is one of two in the Porta del Sol region the other being in Aguadilla.

It also has a marina, four tennis courts, a club house for meetings and parties, a members only restaurant, pool, gym and a recreational park for children.

It annually holds the "Torneo Internacional de Aguja Azul en Línea Liviana" or "International Atlantic blue marlin Light Line Fishing tournament" which is the biggest of its kind in Puerto Rico and in 2010 celebrates its twenty second edition. Two fishing records of released fish have been established at the tournament; in 2003 a (178 blue marlins released) and in 2005 a total of 205 blue marlins released at the tournament.

The club annually serves non for profit organizations such as the Boy Scouts, the "Hogar para niños con Cáncer" and "Centro Espibi". The club also holds navigational courses offered by the United States Coast Guard and free golf clinics for children of low income families.

The "Deportivo" also offers scholarships for summer camps to students, it serves as a dock for the Puerto Rico Department of Natural and Environmental Resources and it allows the Navy to use its vicinity to place an antenna used to measure the tide. Furthermore the club will serve for the installation of a Tsunami Ready alarm for Cabo Rojo.

== Presidents ==
	President	Years
1	Salvador Suau, Noel Piñeiro	1965–1966
2	Ing. Noel Piñeiro	1966–1968
3	Ing. Frank Delgado	1968–1969
4	José M. Charana	1969–1970
5	Ing. Frank Ramirez, José Charana, Dr. Fernando Bayron	1970–1971
6	Dr. Miguel A. Frontera Jr., Edgardo Vazquez, Rafael Comas	1971–1972
7	Bartolo Rivera	1971–1973
8	Ing. Frank Delgado	1973–1974
9	Ing. Alberto Moreda Camino	1974–1975
10	José Pluguez, Cesar Rodríguez	1975–1976
11	Dr. Francisco Guzman	1976–1977
12	Rafael Comas	1977–1979
13	Johnny Cruz Granell	1979–1980
14	Lcdo. Carlos García Rullan	1981–1983
15	Eliseo Font	1983–1984
16	Orlando Lugo Echevarria	1984–1985
17	Johny Cruz Granell	1985–1986
18	Nestor Martínez Vargas	1986–1992
19	Francisco González	1994–2004
20	Heriberto López	2004–2007
21	Normand Morell	2007–2009
22	Ing. Pedro Fernando Diez	2009–present

== See also ==
- Club Náutico de Ponce
- Puerto Del Rey Marina
