= Brewer Cove Haven Marina =

- Marina
- Location within Rhode Island
- Coordinates: 41°45′N 71°21′W
- Country: United States
- State: Rhode Island
- City: Barrington
- Established: 1961

Brewer Cove Haven Marina is a marina located in Barrington, Rhode Island on Narragansett Bay.

== Description ==
Brewer Cove Haven Marina is located in Barrington, on Bullock Cove, at the head of Narragansett Bay. Barrington is 9 miles (14 km) southeast of Providence and 25 miles (40 km) from Block Island. The marina is far removed from the rest of the Rhode Island boating scene. The area was originally home to the Wampanoag Indians.

First built in 1961, Cove Haven became part of the 21-marina chain owned by Jack Brewer of New York in 1967. Cove Haven is a full-service facility with a summer capacity for storing 220 boats in slips and an equal number on land. There is a full boatyard repair service for pleasure and commercial vessels.

The marina specializes in maintaining 12-meter America's Cup yachts. Among those yachts, America's Cup defender Intrepid was rebuilt there in 1997. The marina specializes in fine hull refinishing. Other services include complete repair service to fiberglass hulls and inboard engines, metal fabrication, painting, sailboat rigging, canvas/sails, electronics, bottom cleaning, and keel installation.

Cove Haven is home to a yacht club, transient dockage, launch/haulout, new and used boat brokerages, marine store, fuel dock, and swimming pool. Boat-hauling equipment includes a hydraulic trailer, a crane, and a forklift. 22 employees work full-time year-round, with six part-timers added in the summer boating season. Boat sizes range from under 21 feet to well over 100 feet, with 66% in the 26- to 40-foot size range.

== Management measures ==
Brewer's Cove Haven Marina complies with the marina management measures for sewage facility and maintenance of sewage facilities, as well as shoreline stabilization, storm water runoff control, fueling station design, solid waste, liquid materials, petroleum control, and public education.

== Environmental improvements ==
With the town engineer's approval, a low-volume sewage flow meter and manhole were installed to measure 100% of the marina's sewage output. Other improvements at Cove Haven include oil spill containment equipment stored at the fuel dock, dustless sanding, recycling of used oil and solvents, public education through newsletters and signs, designated hull work areas, and major renovation of restrooms and showers.
