= Marina Izola =

Town in Izola, Slovenia

Coordinates: 45°32′N 13°39′E

The Marina Izola lies in the Slovenian town of Izola. The marina has berths for about 620 boats with a length of up to 30 m and a depth of 4.5 m. In addition, there is also a holiday resort with a hotel and many different attractions such as tennis courts, swimming pool and casino.

The marina is used as base for water sports events such as Austria Cup. In the sea area before Izola are regularly sailed regattas or other water sports events organised.
