= Puerto Del Rey Marina =

Marina in Fajardo, Puerto Rico

Coordinates: 18.287297°N 65.636497°W

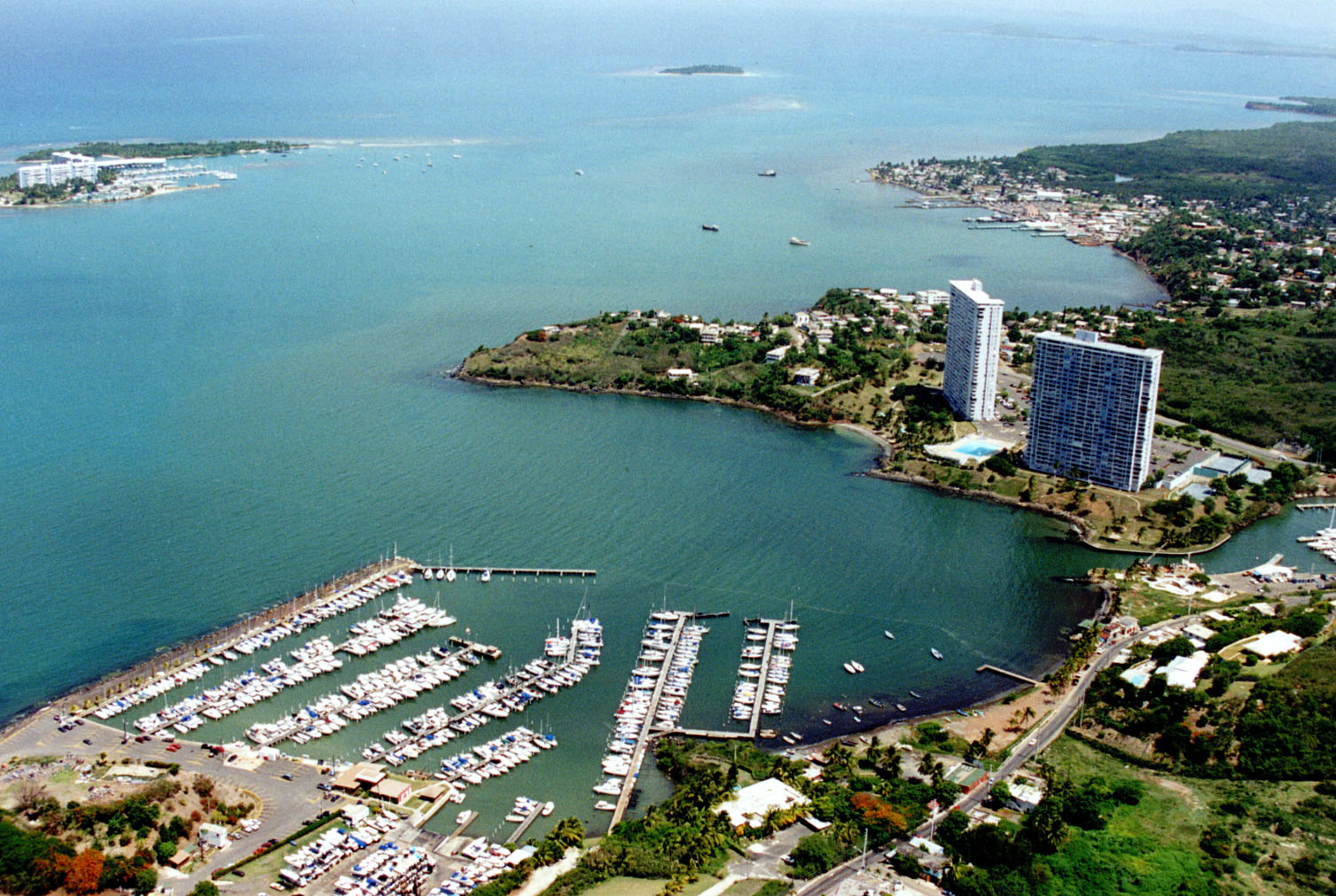
Boats at Puerto Del Rey Marina

Puerto del Rey Marina is a marina in Fajardo, Puerto Rico. With a capacity of over 2,000 boats, it is one of the largest marinas in the Caribbean.

== General description ==
Completed in 1988 and then re-done in 2014, Puerto del Rey Marina is operating at near its capacity of nearly 1,000 wet slips on concrete fixed piers and over 750 dry-stack spaces for smaller boats three-high, with extra spaces along piers and at anchor for transient boats.

Open year-round, the marina's busiest boating season is from October through April. Boats range in size from 30 feet up to 150-foot yachts.

In 2021, the marina's investment in boat forklift machines help it compete with other marinas.

== See also ==
- Club Deportivo del Oeste
- Club Náutico de Ponce
