= Port of Poulsbo =

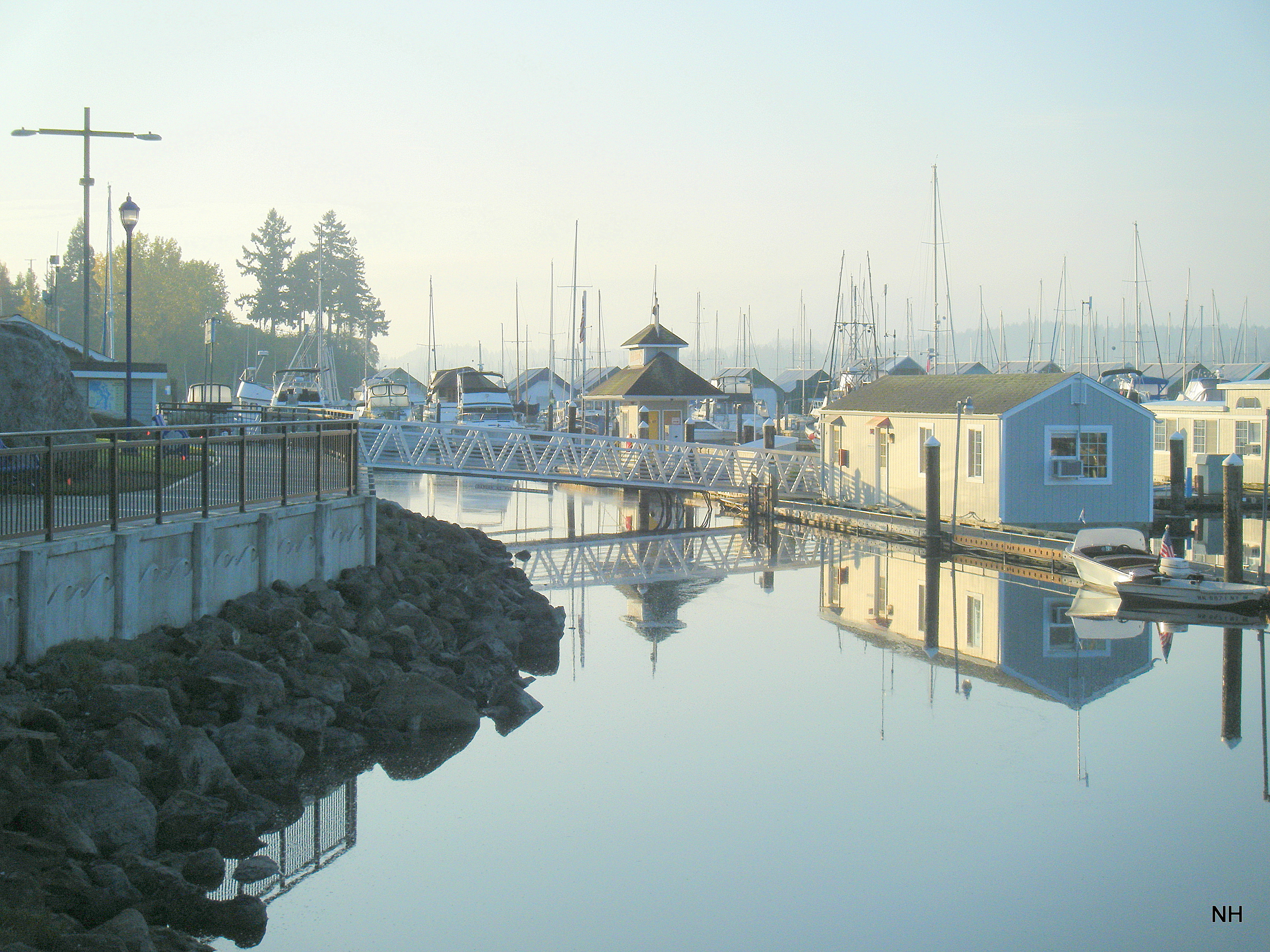
- Port of Poulsbo, including floating harbourmaster's office.

Location
- Country: United States
- Location: Poulsbo, Washington
- Coordinates: 47°43′58″N 122°39′52″W
- UN/LOCODE: WA ---4---- AI 0001

Details
- Opened: 1951
- Operated by: Port of Poulsbo Commission
- Owned by: City of Poulsbo
- No. of berths: 380
- No. of wharfs: 7

Statistics
- Website https://www.portofpoulsbo.com

The Port of Poulsbo is a port serving the city of Poulsbo, Washington, United States. It is located in Liberty Bay on Puget Sound. The port includes the Poulsbo Marina, a seaplane mooring, commercial shops, residential housing (and "liveaboard" housing), the SEA Discovery Center, and Liberty Bay Waterfront Park (Muriel Iverson Williams Waterfront Park). The port is part of downtown Poulsbo, also known as "Little Norway".

== History ==
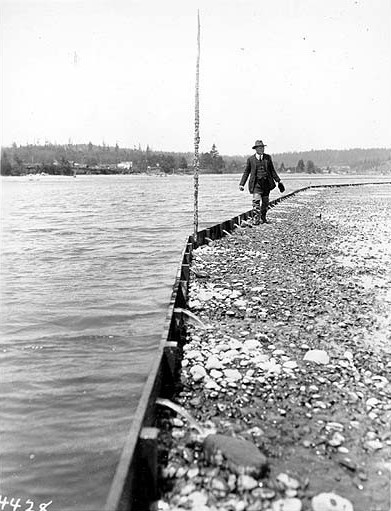
Oyster dyke at Poulsbo, June 1920

Maritime use of the waters around what is now the Port of Poulsbo has a history predating European contact. The Suquamish people harvested fish and shellfish here for several millennia, and a village — ho-cheeb — was located at the head of the bay until the mid-1800s. In the 1855 Treaty of Point Elliott, which made land available to newcomers, the Suquamish Tribe retained fishing and shellfish harvesting rights in its historical territory, including Liberty Bay.

In the early 1900s, the waters off Poulsbo became the base for a fishing fleet that worked in Puget Sound and the Strait of Juan de Fuca, as well as schooners that fished in Alaska for salmon and cod; Poulsbo was home to the Pacific Codfish Company, and fish and oyster canneries.

In 1945, the state of Washington spent $75,000 on upgrades to port facilities to enable its use by commercial passenger and fishing fleets. In the 1950s, local ferries and Puget Sound mosquito fleet passenger vessels provided regular service between Seattle and Kitsap County, including Poulsbo. The Port of Poulsbo was officially established in 1951.

The port plays an important role in preserving the maritime flavor of Poulsbo as well as the environmental health of the bay. The port, which is overseen by a publicly elected three-member board of commissioners and staff, has what is believed to be the last tidal grid in Puget Sound. The port is working on replacing its aging, creosoted breakwater with an environmentally friendly floating breakwater, and partnered with the City of Poulsbo in upgrading a waterfront parking lot with a permeable surface and rain gardens to filter stormwater runoff.

In February 2021, the port's public boat ramp was closed after its condition deteriorated to the point of being inoperable. Work on construction of a new public boat ramp began in June 2021.

== Operations and management ==
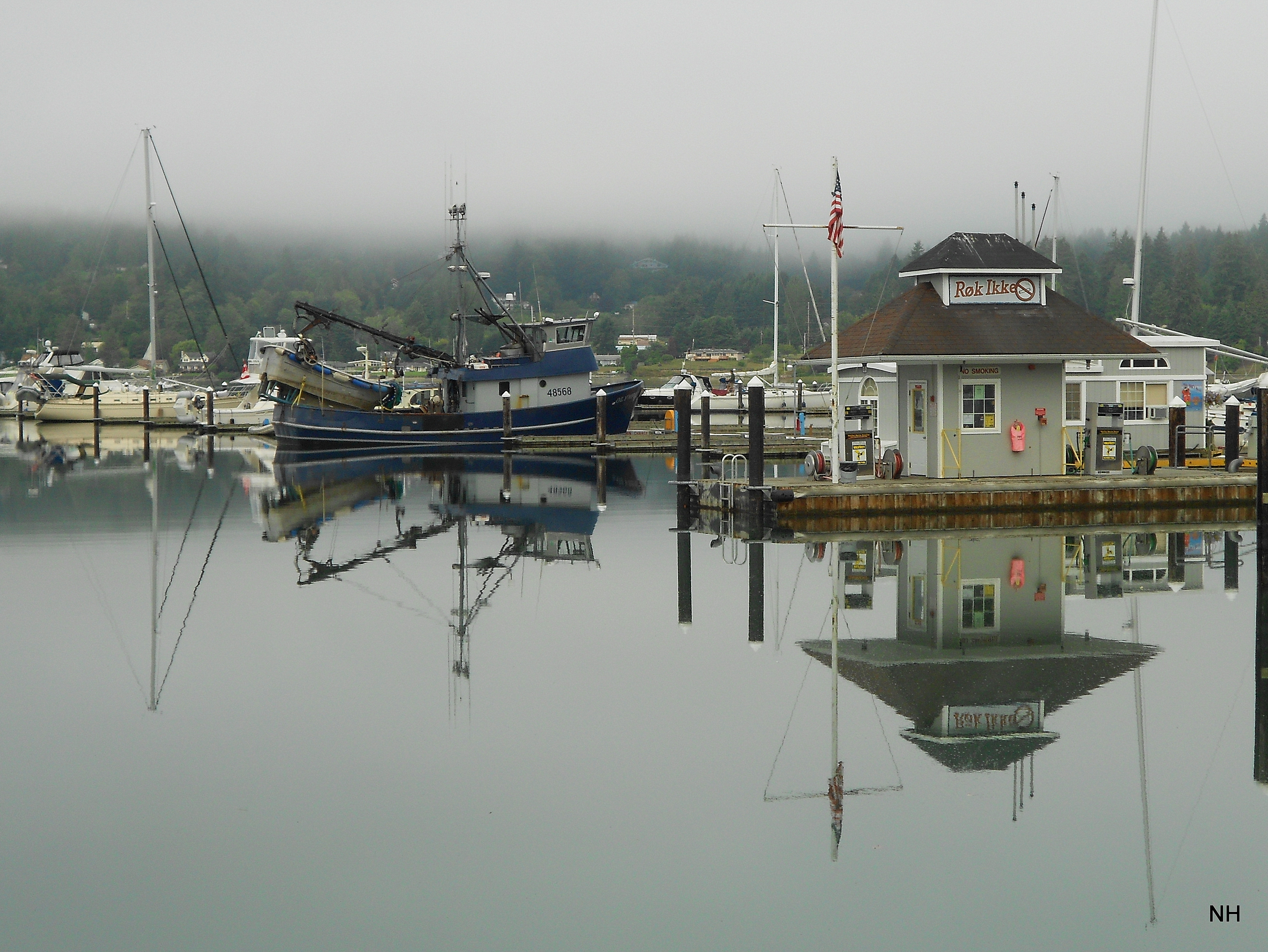
Port of Poulsbo including floating fuel dock

The Port of Poulsbo includes the marina and mooring area, commercial shops, and a Marine Science Center.

The port is managed by the Port of Poulsbo Commission which has 3 commissioners responsible for overseeing the work of a General Manager and other operational staff. Vacancies are filled by agreement of the two remaining commissioners, with the approval of the City of Poulsbo.

== Marina Facilities ==
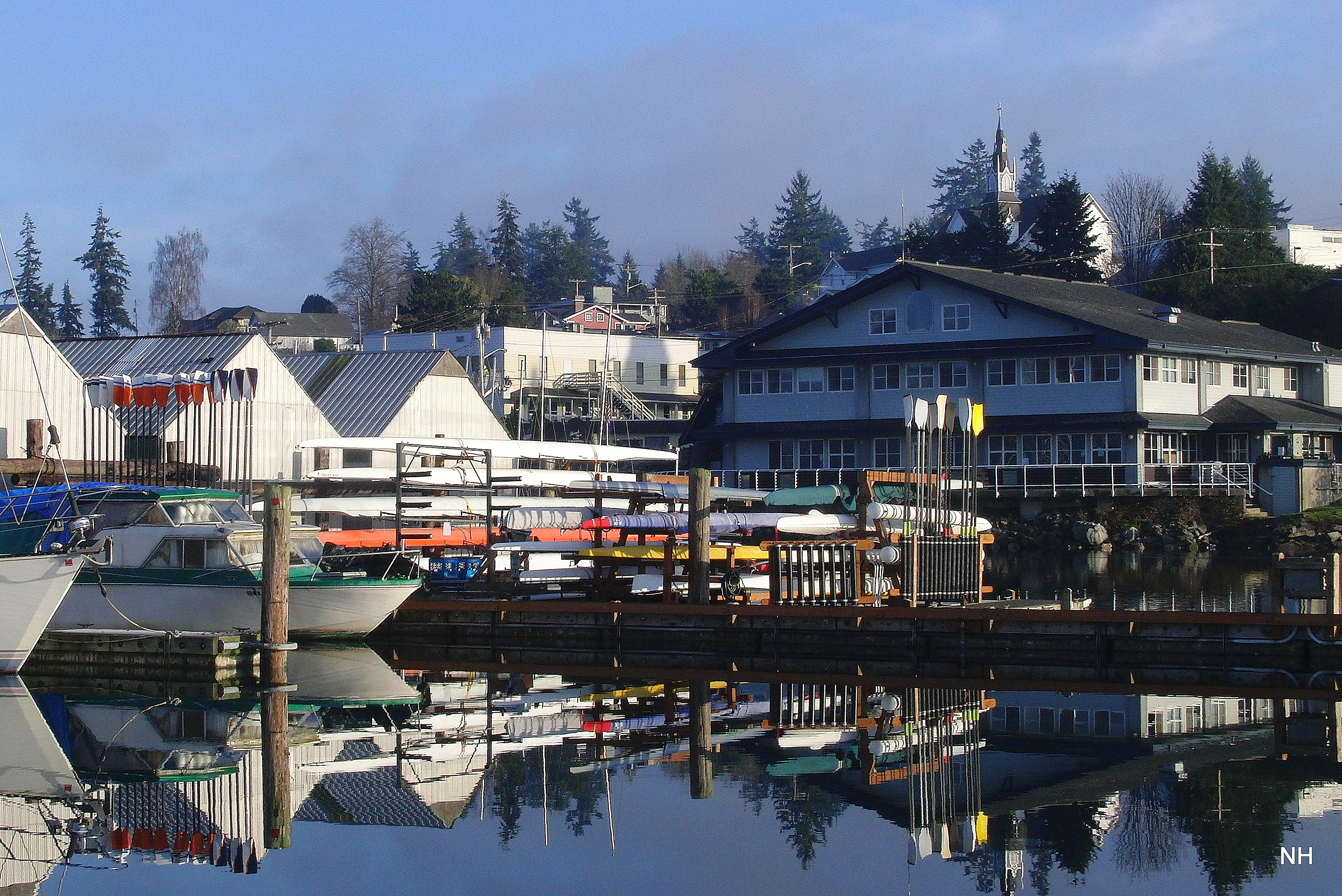
Port facilities with the SEA Discovery Center in the midground and the city's First Lutheran Church in the background

The Poulsbo Marina includes 7 main docks, which contains 254 permanent slips, 130 guest slips, floatplane dock, fuel dock, sanitation pump-out facilities, shower and restroom facilities, launch ramp and laundry facilities.

Facilities also include:

- 130 guest moorage slips with fresh water and 30 amp power
- 254 permanent moorage slips with fresh water and 30 amp power
- Fuel dock with gasoline and diesel fuel
- Commercial pier for loading and unloading equipment
- Tidal grid for marine surveys, plus hull, propeller and zinc inspection
