= Kerala Tourism Development Corporation =

Public sector undertaking

- Type: Kerala Government Undertaking
- Industry: Tourism, Ecotourism, Hotel Management
- Founded: November 1, 1966; 59 years ago
- Headquarters: Thiruvananthapuram, Kerala, India
- Area served: Kerala, India
- Key people: P. C. Vishnunadh (Minister for Tourism); Vacant (Chairperson); Anjana M IAS (Managing Director)
- Owner: Department of Tourism, Government of Kerala
- Website: Official website
- Footnotes; Official host to God's own country

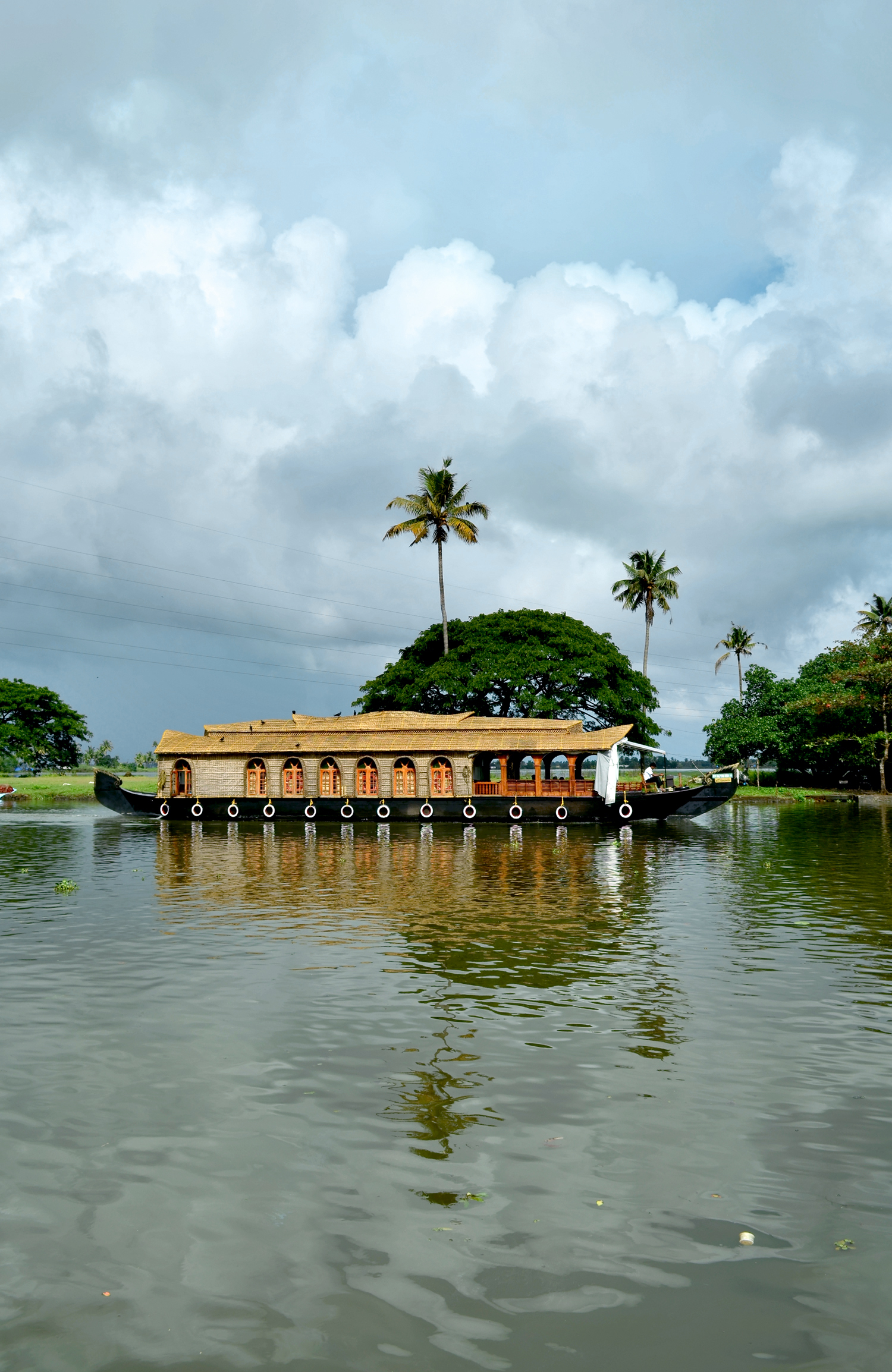
A house Boat View from Vambanad Lake

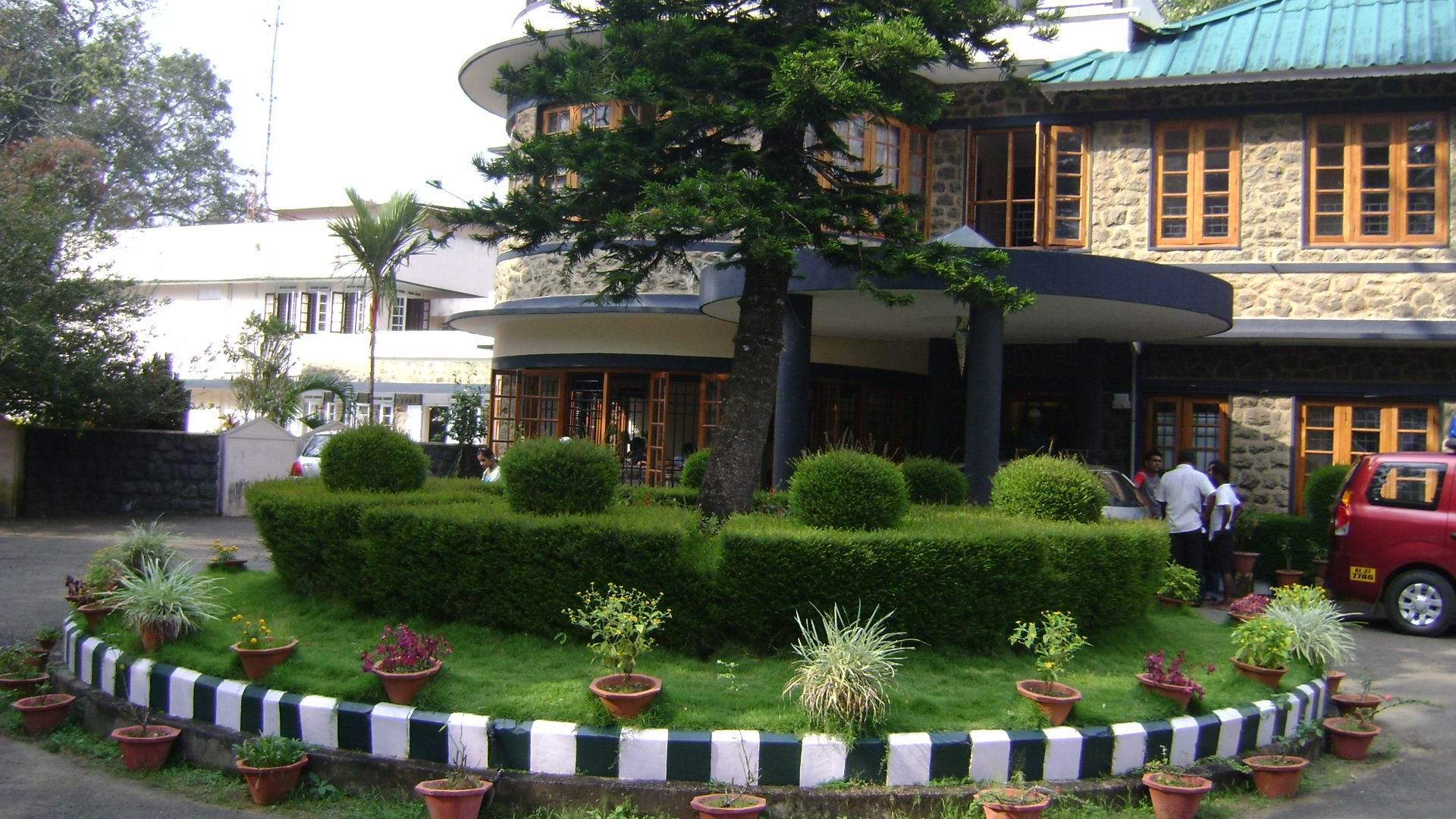
Hotel Aranya Nivas, Thekkady, Kerala

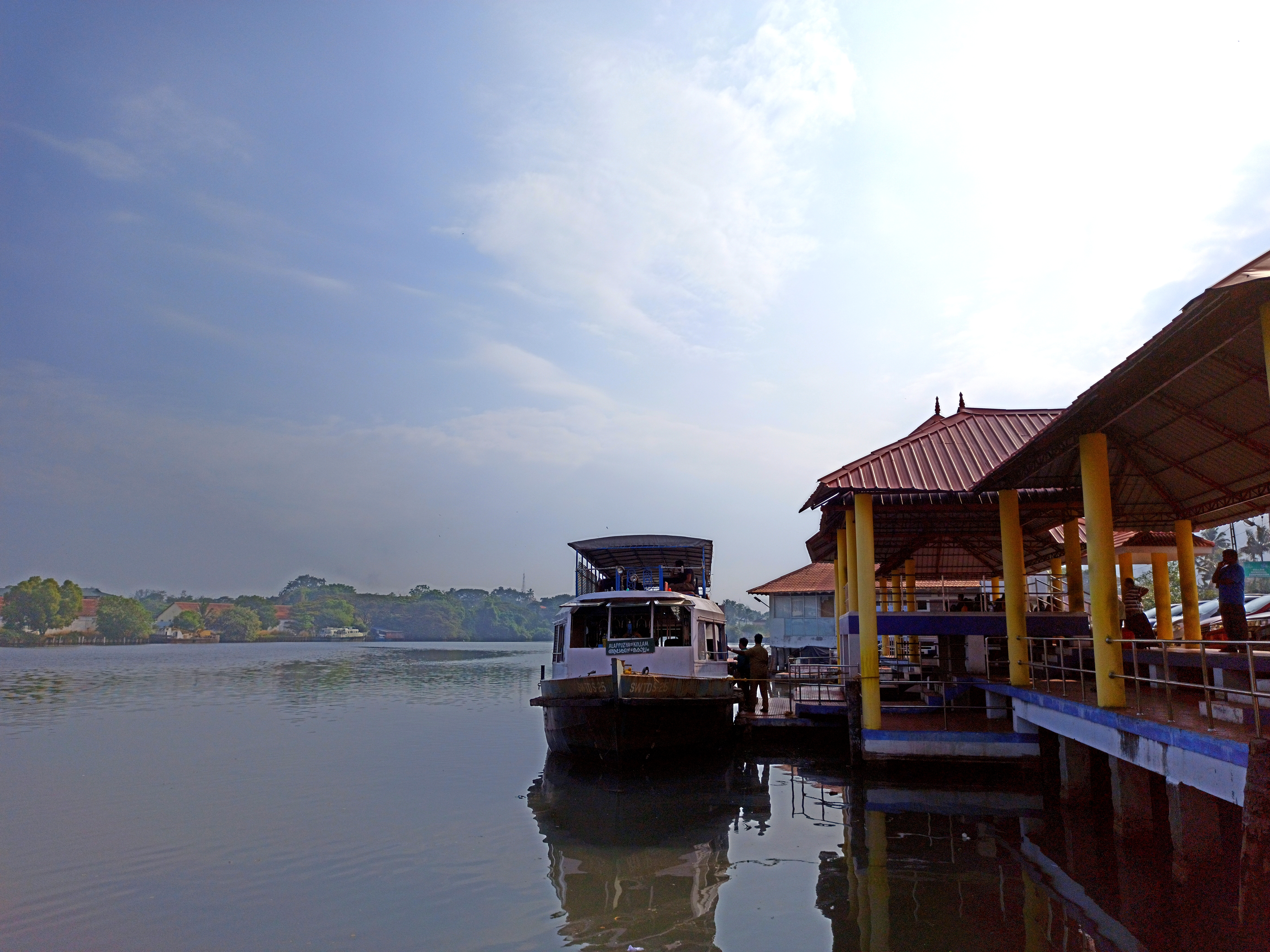
Kollam-Alappuzha tourist boat at Kollam Ferry Terminal

Kerala Tourism Development Corporation (KTDC) is a public sector undertaking that conducts and regulates the tourism activities in the Indian state of Kerala. The KTDC is headquartered at Thiruvananthapuram and has offices across all the districts of Kerala. The agency also operates hotels, resorts, and tourist rest houses in key locations in the state. Its official slogan is "Official host to God's own country." It is one of the most profitable ventures of the Kerala government.

== History ==
Kerala was a relatively unknown state among tourist circles until the early 1960s. The first initiative to popularize Kerala as a tourist destination was undertaken by Travancore's Prince Consort Col. Godavarma Raja (husband of the then Queen of Travancore) started Kerala Tours Limited to popularize key tourist locations in Travancore Kingdom. When Travancore merged with India, Kerala Tours Limited became a private entity under the Travancore royal family. For more than 20 years since Independence, Kerala tended to ignore tourism as a key industry, leaving KTL and other private players to lead the role. In the 1960s, KTL struck gold, by collaborating with Thomas Cook and started popularizing Kovalam in western countries which started the advent of hippie culture in Kovalam Beach. The strong inflow of tourists into Kovalam, started Kerala government to consider tourism as a key industry. Though it tried to nationalize Kerala Tours Limited, it soon fell into legal issues. This resulted in the government to think starting a new entity known as Kerala Tourism Development Corporation (KTDC) IN 1966.

Started as a government department, KTDC became a separate commercial entity by the 1970s. Several premium guest houses of Kerala Government were identified and converted into hotel brands. Lt. Col. G. V. Raja was also the President of Tourism Promotion Council of Kerala. He was the main architect in developing Kovalam as an international tourist spot.

== Objectives ==
1. To promote Kerala as a leading tourist destination
2. To identify key tourist destinations within Kerala and promote it outside
3. To provide auxiliary support in developing key tourist destinations
4. To provide highest quality hospitality services to tourists
5. To act as one-source destination for various informations regarding tourist destinations and other related informations.
6. To ensure higher returns to government, through financial and social viable projects, and thereby provide employment

== Controversies ==
On the early morning of 2 January 2019, Ten members belonging to the Hindu Munnani entered the Kerala House hotel belonging to the Kerala Tourism Development Corporation in the Thousand Lights area, Chennai and smashed the window panes of the hotel. Six members were said to be arrested by the police for damaging public property, criminal intimidation and using filthy language. The attacks came on the same day when two women entered Sabarimala after the constitutional right granted by the Supreme court.

== Properties ==
KTDC owns more than 40 properties ranging from heritage five-star resorts to budget accommodation, managed under five brands in hotel category and 2 in non hotel hospitality category.

=== Heritage Range Hotels ===
KTDC owns 3 flagship properties known for its historical importance.

- Bolgatty Island Resort in Kochi, which houses the Bolgatty Palace, a heritage property which is the largest Dutch palace outside the Netherlands. Built in 1635 as Palace of Dutch Governor of India, this soon became British Residency for Travancore-Cochin Kingdoms. The palace is part of Bolgatty resort which has another property, branded as Island Resort, which has a nine-course golf club, horsing tracks and other facilities.
- Mascot Hotel, located in state capital Thiruvananthapuram is a heritage property built in 1902 which used to accommodate Travancore Army officials and Army Center until 1949.
- Lake Palace, a former summer palace of the King of Travancore, is on an island in the middle of the Periyar Lake — 20 minutes by boat from the mainland, located inside the Periyar Tiger Reserve.

=== Specialty Range Hotels ===
KTDC has 7 resort styled hotel properties aiming for leisure travellers. All properties in the premium range are individually branded .

- Marina House: KTDC manages India's first marina which includes a 24-room hotel, Marina House, located in Bolgatty Island (West), Kochi. The facility features 34 berthing spaces of yachts and Marina Club House for travellers to unwind their journeys with facilities for embarkation and disembarkation process.
- Bolgatty Island Resort- Part of Bolgatty Island, the resort features a world class urban resort with a nine course golf course, a horse track, honeymoon cottages and private gardens.
- Aranya Nivas Thekkady built within Periyar National Park is a five-star jungle lodge.
- Waterscapes Kumarakom is a group of lake cottage suites built over Vembanadu Lake in the tourist destination Kumarakom.
- Samudra Beach Kovalam, a five-star property in Kovalam Beach
- Tea County Munnar, a heritage colonial tea estate bungalow refurnished as a four-star hotel
- Suvasam Lake Resort Alapuzha, is a latest property located close to Thaneermukkam Bund overlooking the mighty Vembandu Lake.

=== Value plus ===
KTDC has three-star "value plus" range hotels across five districts of Kerala. Most of the hotels are designed to cater business and upper-segment family market. Each value plus hotel property is themed around its location.

- Golden Peak Ponmudi: Honeymoon Hotel
- Chitaram Thiruvananthapuram: City Business Hotel
- Nandhanam Guruvayur: Pilgrim Hotel
- Periyar House Thekkady: Jungle Safari Lodge
- Garden House Malampuzha: Picnic Hotel
- Peppergrove Wayanad: Spice Garden Hotel
- Raindrops Chennai; first hotel of KTDC outside Kerala, located in Chennai, capital of Tamil Nadu. Business class hotel.

=== Tamarind Easy ===
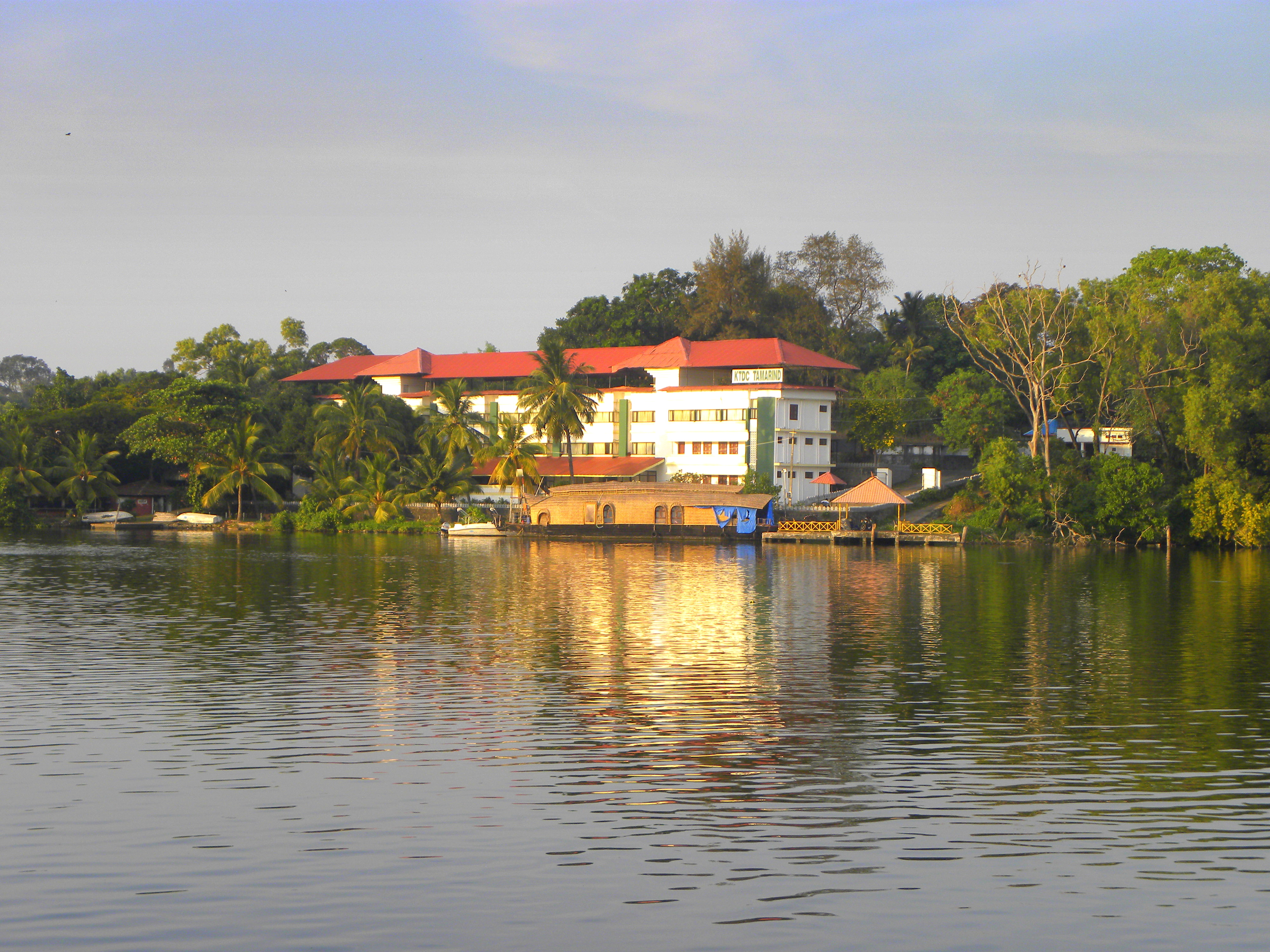
KTDC Tamarind Hotel on the banks of Lake Ashtamudi in Kollam city

Tamarind Easy is a series of 15 budget hotels spread across Kerala, to cater to budget tourists. Major cities including Kollam, Alappuzha, Thrissur and Kannur have Tamarind hotels.

=== Aaram ===
KTDC was one of the first hospitality chains in India to start series of motels across major state and national highways. The motels are branded as Aaram, which are designed as roadside multi-cuisine restaurants. Every Aaram has a large restaurant, rest rooms and many motels have dormitories as well as a medical center. A few designated Aarams do have beer parlors which serves limited alcohol drinks as well as beer.

=== Events Hub ===
KTDC manages 2 properties under Non Hotel Hospitality category.

The Bolgatty Events Center which is a 5 star convention center facility located in Bolgatty Island Resort in Kochi is the flagship project under this category. The Events center features a 1000-seater convention hall, a 15-acre open grounds for exhibitions and open air events.

GV Raja International Convention Center in Kovalam, Trivandrum is another major facility.

=== Take a Break ===
Take a Break (TAB) is the latest venture from KTDC, aiming to create roadside multi-utility kiosks that have a refreshment center, a sovenior shop, cloakroom, rest rooms, information center with ATM facility, Pharmacy etc. assist road travellers for a break and quick refreshment. The tourism ministry is planning to open and operate 20 TAB units in their first stage of TAB project implementation.

TAB is a Private-Public Partnership program with individuals owning the facility, while KTDC assisting in branding and promotion.

== Package tours ==
KTDC sells packaged tours of Kerala across world, through a network of travel agents and tour agencies who act as general sales agents of KTDC. More than 20 products are offered by KTDC.

=== Conducted and sight-seeing tours ===
KTDC conducts one-day and two-day sight-seeing tours in major cities as well as in tourist centers. This includes bus/tourist cars trips and boat ferries.

== Tourist reception ==
KTDC has several tourist reception centers in all major cities and tourist centers, from where conducted tours start and end, in addition to providing complementary information about tourist destinations, maps and guides.
