= Barbeau =

Barbeau is a surname of French origin. The name refers to:

- Adrienne Barbeau (b. 1945), American stage, film, and television actress
- André Barbeau (1931–1986), French-Canadian neurologist and researcher into Parkinson's disease
- Anton Barbeau (contemporary), American singer and songwriter
- Clayton Barbeau (1930–2019), American author, public speaker and therapist
- Jap Barbeau (1882–1969), American professional baseball player
- Manon Barbeau (contemporary), Canadian film director and screenwriter
- Marcel Barbeau (1925–2016), Canadian artist
- Marion Barbeau (born 1991), French ballerina and actress
- Marius Barbeau (1883–1969), Canadian ethnographer and folklorist
- Raymond Barbeau (1930–1992), French-Canadian essayist, literary critic, and naturopath
- Victor Barbeau (1896–1994), Québécois writer and academic

== Places ==
- Barbeau, Michigan, an unincorporated community
