= Marina Punat =

Coordinates: 45°1′49″N 14°37′42″E

Marina Punat Zuma is a tourist destination located near the village of Punat, Croatia on the island of KrK. It is the largest marina in the Northern Adriatic. The island is connected to mainland Croatia by a bridge, which directly connects to a highway. The marina is approximately half an hour by car from the nearest airport with service to Eastern Europe.

The marina lies in a bay that is naturally shielded from wind with local services available throughout the year.

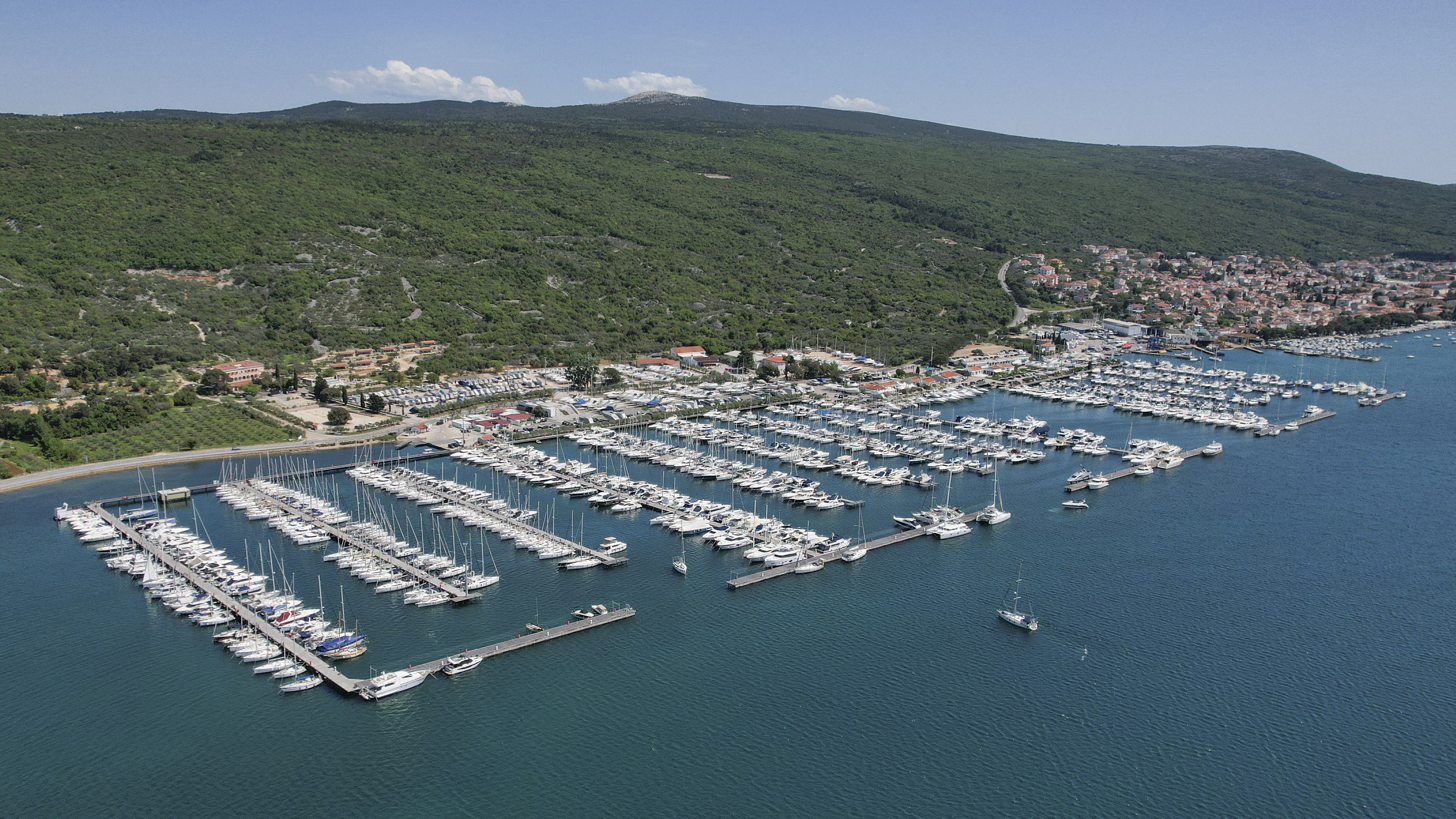
Aerial view

Marina Punat is the first Croatian marina to own the ISO 14001 certificate for environmental maintenance and ISO 9001 for quality management.
