= Portaferry Marina =

Coordinates: 54°22.67′N 5°32.85′W

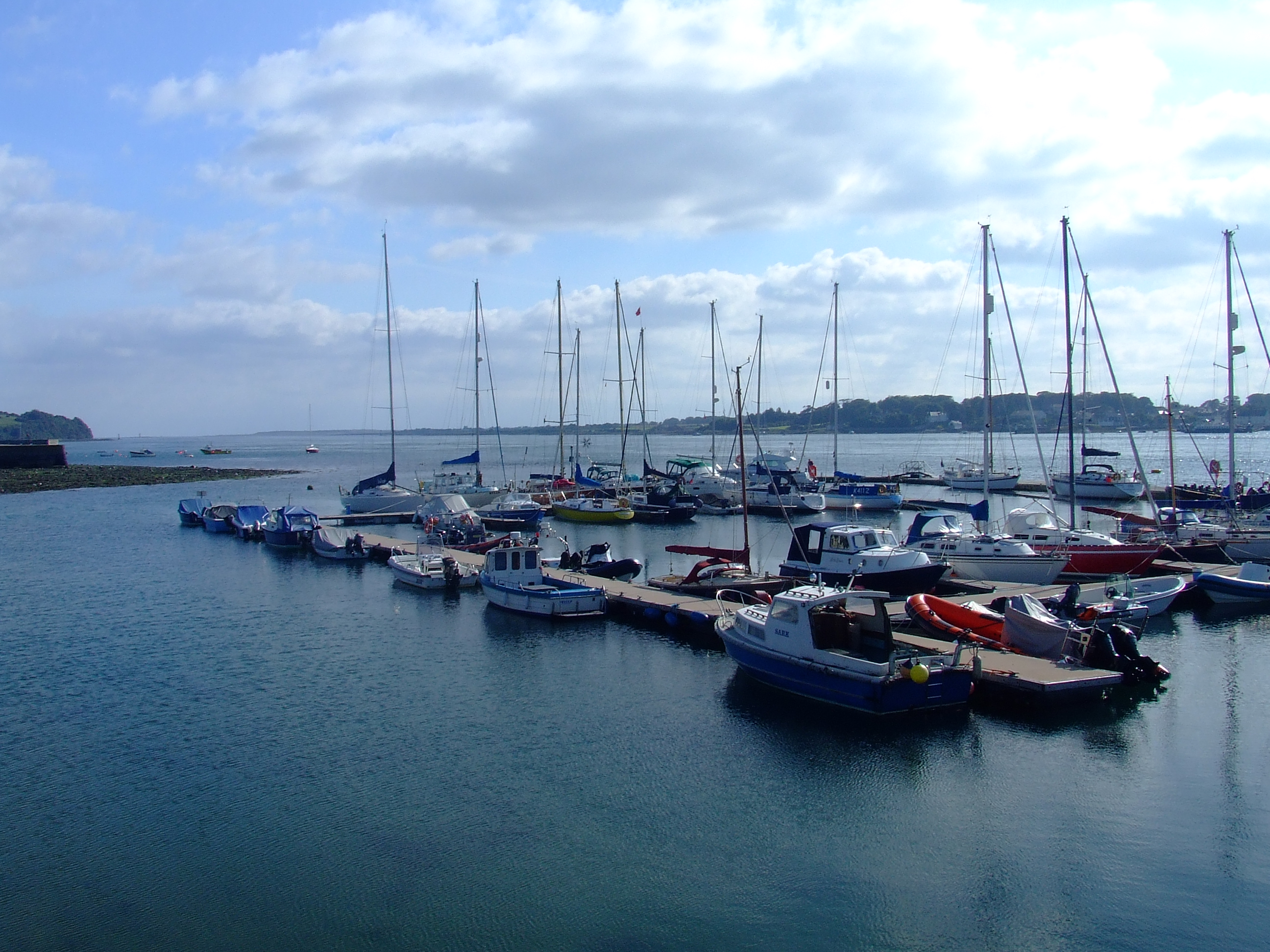
Portaferry Marina, looking towards the narrows.

Portaferry Marina is situated in Portaferry, on the east shore of The Narrows (separating Portaferry and Strangford villages), the gateway to Strangford Lough, County Down, Northern Ireland. It is owned and managed by Portaferry Regeneration, is sited 100 metres south of the ferry slipway in Portaferry and can accommodate up to 50 boats. Approximately 12 berths are reserved purely for visitor use and there is on-site water and electricity. Portaferry village centre is nearby. The marina pontoon is chain fixed and provides good shelter, although the current can reach up to 11 knots.
