= Oak Harbor Marina =

- Location: Oak Harbor, Washington
- Coordinates: 48.285575°N 122.629804°W

History
- Completion date: 1974

Oak Harbor Marina is located in Oak Harbor, Washington, between metropolitan Seattle and the San Juan Islands. The marina was built in 1974 and expanded its guest moorage in 1988 with the installation of the floating breakwater. Income from the marina goes into a city enterprise fund dedicated to the facility's operation and maintenance. It is a 420-boat facility with 217 open and 135 covered permanent slips, 52 guest moorage slips, ample side-tie moorage and 96 dry storage (garage type sheds). The boat mix is 40% sailboats and 60% powerboats, ranging in size from 24 feet (7.3 m) up to 50 feet (average 36 feet). Eleven vessels are liveaboards. No more live aboard vessels will be granted at the marina.

Transient guest moorage (dockage) is available for up to 100 more boats, 38 of which are along the floating breakwater's walkway, where boats up to 40 feet (12 m) LOA can tie up. The breakwater is a Wave Guard offset floating breakwater built of concrete and wood by Bellingham Marine Industries.

Fuel dock has a pump-out as well as a pump-out caddy. Access to this pump-out is limited to vessels with a length of no more than 75 feet (23 m). Gasoline and diesel fuel can be purchased on site. There is a boat launch available. The guest dock is 900 feet (270 m) in length. There are 52 guest moorage slips available. The total estimated guest boat capacity is 100. Electrical hook up is available for a fee. Electrical power is available in 20 and 30 amps. It has been reported the minimum depth at mean low tide is 6.

== Environmental improvements ==
Water-Loo is the name given to Oak Harbor Marina's anchored barge with twin restrooms. In 1995 a combined total of 1,700 pumpouts were done. An estimated total 40,000 gallons of boat sewage was collected from both the barge and fuel dock, an average of 23.5 gallons per boat. Currently, the sewage goes into a city truck, which transports it to the sewer plant without charge.

== Services ==
- Guest Moorage including electricity.
- Permanent Moorage
- Waiting List
- Electricity
- 96 Storage Sheds. Each one is capable of housing boats up to 21' in length.
- Fuel (89 octane or number 2 diesel fuel) and Pump-out available at the fuel dock.
- Activity Float and BBQ
- Water
- Half mile walking distance to restaurants, antique malls, library, post office and banking services
- Marine supplies, repairs, and boat launch nearby
- Well maintained restrooms
- Showers - Cleartoken
- Laundry - Cleartoken
- Key Code Access
- Waterfront Park and Gazebo with covered seating
- Other Services like Laundromat, Boat Launching Ramp, Parking Storage.
