= Ardglass Marina =

Major fishing port in Northern Ireland

- Phennick Cove Marina
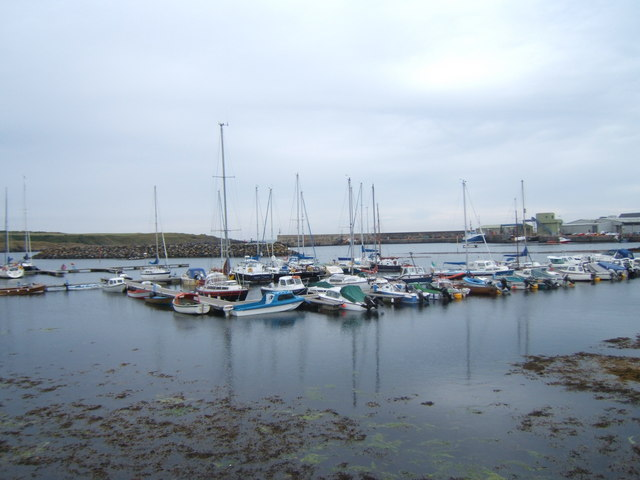
- Ardglass Marina, 2006

- Location in Northern Ireland

General information
- Location: Ardglass, County Down, Northern Ireland
- Coordinates: 54.26°N 5.606°W

Ardglass Marina, also known as Phennick Cove Marina, is situated in Ardglass, County Down, one of three major fishing ports in Northern Ireland. Ardglass is now one of the safest small harbours on the east coast of Ireland, following improvements made in recent years.

== Features ==
The marina has approximately 80 berths and can be used by local and visiting yachts. It is just south of the entrance to Strangford Lough, and yachts can berth if they need to wait for a favourable tide to get into the Lough. It is also used as a stopover point for yachts travelling up or down the Irish Sea coast. The Marina is a chain-fixed pontoon and is open 24 hours a day all year round. It provides good shelter for boats and is separated from the fishing harbour to the south by an outcrop of rocks.
