= La Salina, Baja California =

La Salina Del Mar
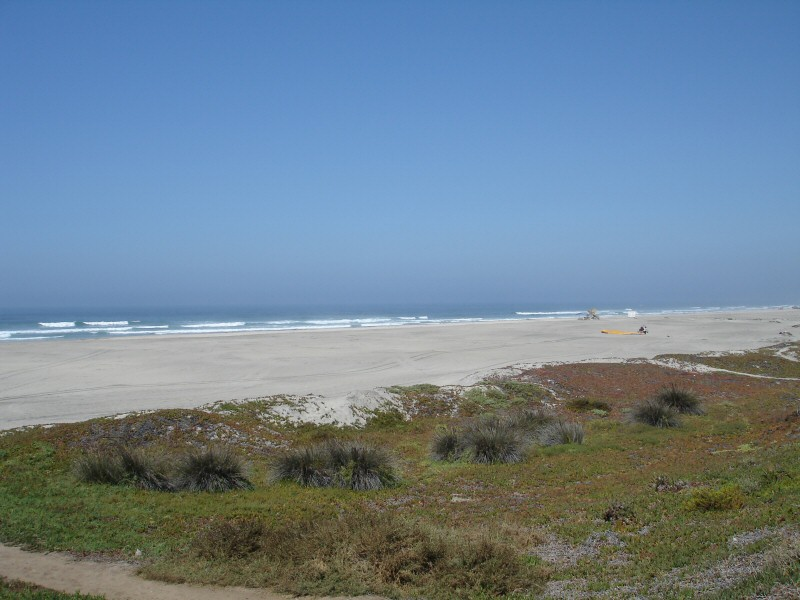
- La Salina Beach on a summer day

- Location in Mexico
- Coordinates: 32°03′36″N 116°52′42″W
- Country: Mexico
- State: Baja California
- Municipality: Ensenada
- Elevation: 43 ft (13 m)

Population (2010)
  - City: 12
  - Urban: 0

La Salina Del Mar is a gringo community in the Mexican state of Baja California. It is located on the beach 73 km (45 mi) south of Tijuana at 32° 03´36" N 116° 52´ 42" W. La Salina is the home of Puerto Salina, the first marina in Mexico south of the United States border on the Pacific Ocean. This harbor has become silted in over the past several years and is impassable to anything larger than a jet ski or a panga. At low tide no vessel of any sort can enter the harbor. The annual gray whale migration path is approx 1 km (0.62 mi) off the coast and they can often be seen surfacing from the beach. La Salina Del Mar is also home of Puerto Cielo, Baja's most diverse airsport venue. Paraglider and hang glider pilots come from throughout North America to enjoy the coastal mountain ridge that offers a strong thermal and one of the most spectacular ocean views available to glider pilots.

Nearby communities include La Misión, Baja California 3 miles (4.8 km) to the north and Bajamar Golf Resort is 3 miles (4.8 km) south of La Salina.
