= Puerto Salina =

Marina in La Salina, Baja California, Mexico

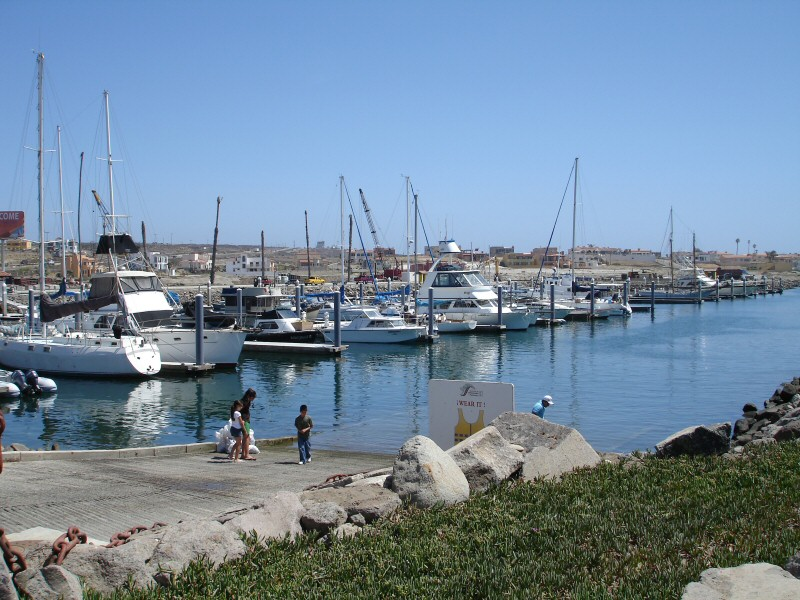
- Marina boat launch

- Location in Mexico
- Coordinates: 32°3′N 116°53′W
- Country: Mexico
- State: Baja California

Marina Puerto Salina is a marina in the Mexican state of Baja California. It is located at 73 km south of Tijuana at 32° 3.28´N 116° 53.20´W. Puerto Salina is the first marina in Mexico south of the United States border on the Pacific Ocean. Puerto Salina is located next to La Salina, Baja California, 62 km (45 mi) south of San Diego Bay. The marina has more than 250 slips and can accommodate yachts as large as 100 feet in length.

== Gallery ==
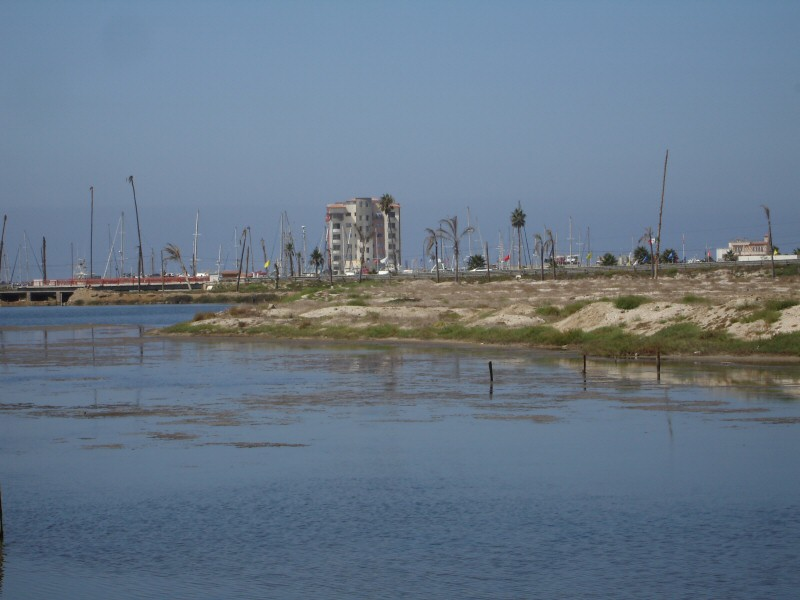
Rancho La Salina view of Puerto Salina

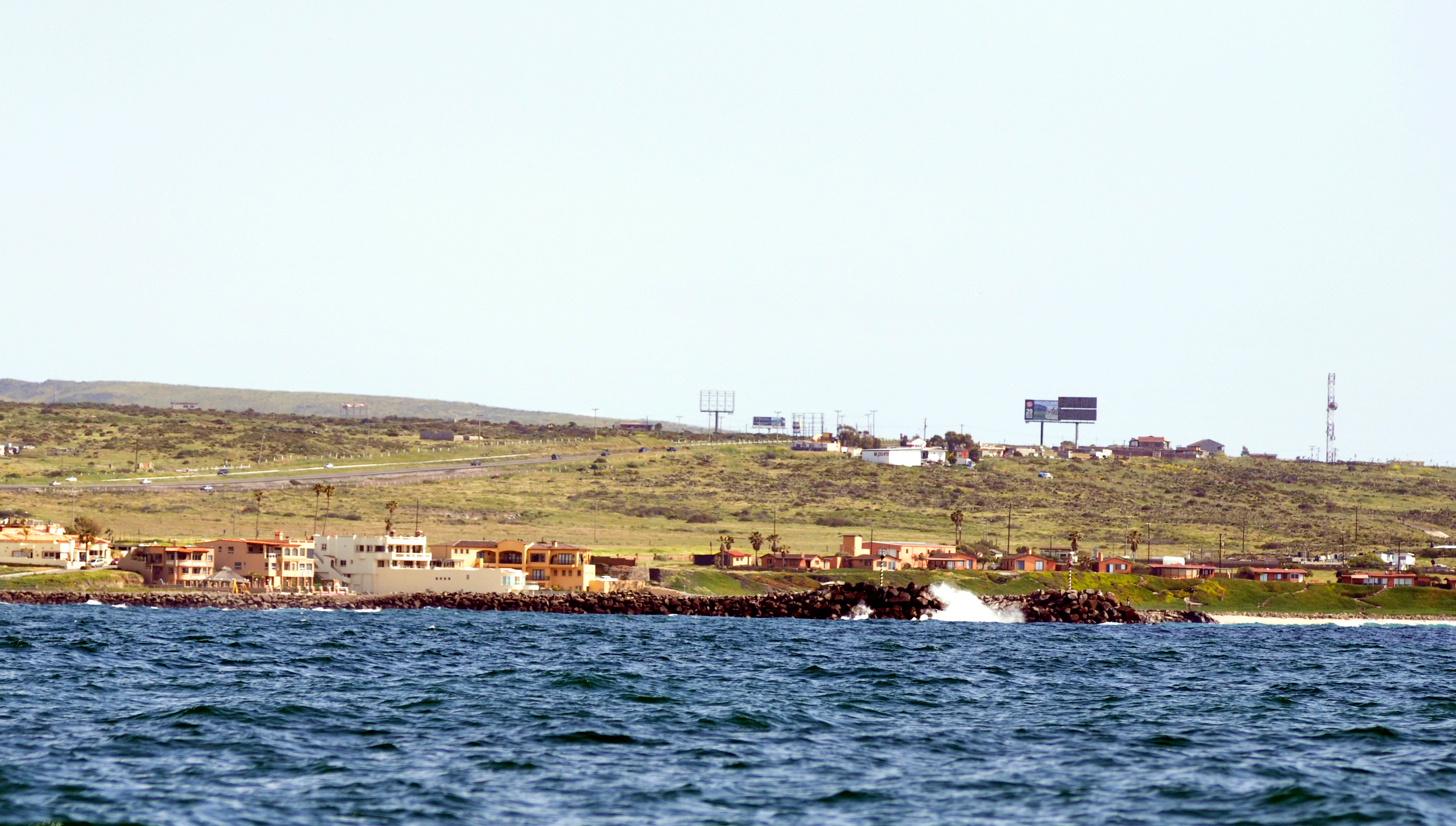
Harbor entrance as seen on approach from the north
