= 100.3 FM =

FM radio frequency

The following radio stations broadcast on FM frequency 100.3 MHz:

== Argentina ==
- Trip in Rosario, Santa Fe
- Pueblo Esther in Pueblo Esther, Santa Fe

== Australia ==
- 2MCR in Campbelltown, New South Wales
- ABC NewsRadio in Mildura, Victoria
- 4BAY in Brisbane, Queensland
- 2NEB in Armidale, New South Wales
- Hot FM in Mackay, Queensland
- 3MEL in Melbourne, Victoria
- 5EZY in Adelaide, South Australia
- TLCFM In Yamba, New South Wales
- 2YAS in Yass, New South Wales

== Canada (Channel 262) ==
- CBAF-FM-4 in Edmundston, New Brunswick
- CBAP-FM in Shelburne, Nova Scotia
- CBNA-FM in St. Anthony, Newfoundland and Labrador
- CBQU-FM in Pikangikum, Ontario
- CBTS-FM in Creston, British Columbia
- CFAQ-FM in Blucher, Saskatchewan
- CFBR-FM in Edmonton, Alberta
- CFKI-FM in Kitimat, British Columbia
- CFOZ-FM in Argentia, Newfoundland and Labrador
- CFPA-FM in Port Alice, British Columbia
- CFTL-FM in Big Trout Lake, Ontario
- CHTN-FM in Charlottetown, Prince Edward Island
- CHVD-FM in Dolbeau, Quebec
- CIHW-FM in Loretteville, Quebec
- CIRA-FM-1 in Sherbrooke, Quebec
- CJLF-FM in Barrie, Ontario
- CJMC-FM in Ste-Anne-des-Monts, Quebec
- CJMJ-FM in Ottawa, Ontario
- CJVR-FM-1 in Dafoe, Saskatchewan
- CKCQ-FM in Quesnel, British Columbia
- CKKQ-FM in Victoria, British Columbia
- CKRZ-FM in Ohsweken, Ontario

== China ==
- CNR Business Radio in Benxi

== Honduras ==
HRAX - Musiquera, Santa Bárbara, Santa Bárbara

HRAX - Musiquera, Santa Cruz de Yojoa, Cortés

HRAX - Musiquera, Ocotepeque, Ocotepeque

HRAX - Musiquera, La Entrada, Copán

HRAX - Musiquera, Santa Rosa de Copán

HRZA - Radio Guarajambala, La Esperanza, Intibucá

== Ireland ==
- Radio Nova in Dublin

== Israel ==
- Kan Reka in Jerusalem and Safed

== Italy ==
- Rai Radio 3 Classica in Rome

== Malaysia ==
- Pahang FM in Cameron Highlands, Pahang

== Mexico ==
- XHAGI-FM in Aguililla, Michoacán
- XHAV-FM in Guadalajara, Jalisco
- XHDX-FM in Ensenada, Baja California
- XHEN-FM in Torreón, Coahuila
- XHMI-FM in Campeche, Campeche
- XHPP-FM in Fortín, Veracruz
- XHPTOM-FM in Puerto Morelos, Quintana Roo
- XHQUE-FM in Querétaro, Querétaro
- XHSD-FM in Hermosillo, Sonora
- XHTF-FM in Monclova, Coahuila
- XHTNY-FM in Tepic, Nayarit
- XHXZ-FM in Apizaco, Tlaxcala
- XHZS-FM in Mazatlán, Sinaloa

== Philippines (Channel 262) ==
- DZRJ-FM in Metro Manila
- DWHI in Legazpi City, Albay
- DYRJ-FM in Cebu City
- DXDJ-FM in Davao City

== Portugal ==
- Antena 3 in Lisbon

== Singapore ==
- UFM100.3 in Singapore

== Taiwan ==
- National Education Radio Education network in Yuli
- Bao dao Radio Station(Chinese: 寶島廣播電台) in Chiayi

== United Kingdom ==
- Heart Scotland in Glasgow
- Classic FM (UK) in Durham, Bradford and South Hampshire

== United States (Channel 262) ==
- KACG in Goldfield, Nevada
- KAPA in Hilo, Hawaii
- KATZ-FM in Bridgeton, Missouri
- KBRG in San Jose, California
- KBWN-LP in Buena, Washington
- KCCN in Honolulu, Hawaii
- KCUG-LP in Omaha, Nebraska
- KCVJ in Osceola, Missouri
- KCWG-LP in Crown King, Arizona
- KCXR in Taft, Oklahoma
- KCYY in San Antonio, Texas
- KDJE in Jacksonville, Arkansas
- KDRB in Des Moines, Iowa
- KDVV in Topeka, Kansas
- KEAJ-LP in Cell Site, Montana
- KFXN-FM in Minneapolis, Minnesota
- KFXS in Rapid City, South Dakota
- KHEX in Concow, California
- KICY in Nome, Alaska
- KILT in Houston, Texas
- KIMN in Denver, Colorado
- KJCM (FM) in Snyder, Oklahoma
- KJKK in Dallas, Texas
- KJMB in Blythe, California
- KJNP in North Pole, Alaska
- KKLQ in Los Angeles, California
- KKRZ in Portland, Oregon
- KLRZ in Larose, Louisiana
- KLSK in Great Falls, Montana
- KMAK in Orange Cove, California
- KMMX in Tahoka, Texas
- KMOB-LP in Clearlake, California
- KNZS in Arlington, Kansas
- KOKU in Agana, Guam
- KOMX in Pampa, Texas
- KPEK in Albuquerque, New Mexico
- KPYT-LP in Tucson, Arizona
- KQMR in Globe, Arizona
- KQUT-LP in Saint George, Utah
- KQXR in Payette, Idaho
- KRDQ in Colby, Kansas
- KRQK in Lompoc, California
- KRRV in Alexandria, Louisiana
- KRWQ in Gold Hill, Oregon
- KSBK in Blanca, Colorado
- KSFI in Salt Lake City, Utah
- KSNR in Thief River Falls, Minnesota
- KSRB-LP in Corpus Christi, Texas
- KTEX in Mercedes, Texas
- KUCP-LP in Kent, Washington
- KUKU-FM in Willow Springs, Missouri
- KURM-FM in Gravette, Arkansas
- KVFS-LP in Spokane, Washington
- KWAW in Garapan-Saipan, Northern Mariana Islands
- KWPT in Fortuna, California
- KWSI-LP in Grand Junction, Colorado
- KXAA in Cle Elum, Washington
- KXPM-LP in Perham, Minnesota
- KXRF-LP in Dodge, North Dakota
- KZEN in Central City, Nebraska
- KZMQ in Greybull, Wyoming
- KZQX in Tatum, Texas
- WAFD in Webster Springs, West Virginia
- WAPP-LP in Westhampton, New York
- WAUE in Waverly, Alabama
- WBBY-LP in Berwick, Pennsylvania
- WBIG in Washington, District of Columbia
- WBZI in Xenia, Ohio
- WCCI in Savanna, Illinois
- WCEG in Delhi, New York
- WCLT-FM in Newark, Ohio
- WCTH in Plantation Key, Florida
- WCYQ in Oak Ridge, Tennessee
- WFFG-FM in Warrensburg, New York
- WGRY in Grayling, Michigan
- WGYY in Meadville, Pennsylvania
- WHEB in Portsmouth, New Hampshire
- WHGL in Canton, Pennsylvania
- WHGW-LP in Morganton, North Carolina
- WHTZ in Newark, New Jersey
- WIVA in Aguadilla, Puerto Rico
- WIXY in Champaign, Illinois
- WKIT in Brewer, Maine
- WKKB in Middletown, Rhode Island
- WKYV in Petersburg, Virginia
- WLGP in Harkers Island, North Carolina
- WLKI in Angola, Indiana
- WLML-FM in Lake Park, Florida
- WMKS in High Point, North Carolina
- WMVU in Sylvan Beach, New York
- WNAR-LP in Arcade, New York
- WNCY in Neenah-Menasha, Wisconsin
- WNIC in Dearborn, Michigan
- WNSL in Laurel, Mississippi
- WOBB in Tifton, Georgia
- WORG in Elloree, South Carolina
- WOSL in Norwood, Ohio
- WQNB-LP in Miami, Florida
- WQRV in Meridianville, Alabama
- WRKE-LP in Salem, Virginia
- WRMK-LP in Augusta, Georgia
- WRNB in Media, Pennsylvania
- WRUM in Orlando, Florida
- WSEA in Atlantic Beach, South Carolina
- WSMX-FM in Goshen, Alabama
- WSTX in Christiansted, Virgin Islands
- WTBC in Chicago, Illinois
- WTKE-FM in Niceville, Florida
- WUPT (FM) in Gwinn, Michigan
- WVMK-LP in Vicksburg, Mississippi
- WVVR in Hopkinsville, Kentucky
- WVZM-LP in Memphis, Tennessee
- WWOP-LP in Ocean City, Maryland
- WYGB in Edinburgh, Indiana
- WYLT-LP in Rocky Mount, North Carolina
