= R Dub! =

American DJ and radio host

Sultan of Republic of Slowjamastan
- Incumbent
- Assumed office Dec 1, 2021
- Preceded by: Office established

Personal details
- Born: Chicago, Illinois
- Occupation: Radio host; disc jockey; radio program director

Randy Williams, better known by the stage name R Dub!, is an American DJ and radio host. He is best known as the host and creator of Sunday Night Slow Jams, which he created on 24 July 1994. A program director of XHRM-FM and XHITZ-FM, Sunday Night Slow Jams is broadcast on more than 200 radio stations. Williams also serves as the self-proclaimed sultan of his own micronation, the Republic of Slowjamastan, located in Imperial County, Southern California, which he founded on 1 December 2021. Additionally, he is also noted to have visited all 193 United Nations member states, making him one of at least 250 people to do so.

== Early life ==
Randy Williams was born near Chicago, Illinois, and lived there until he was three when his parents divorced. He moved to Los Angeles, California with his mother, and resided there for the next ten years until she remarried and moved back to Chicago. Williams chose to live with his father in Orlando, Florida for the next three years. During this time he missed the West Coast and grew to despise Orlando. He elaborated, "When you're a kid you think that where you live is like every other place in America." When Williams' mother and stepfather decided to retire to Tucson, Arizona, Williams decided to live with them as a way to get somewhat nearer to California.

== Career ==
Williams' first professional job in radio came when he was 16, when he was hired to work for KXCI in Tucson after having enrolled in a disc jockey class there. He presented a slow jam show called Nyte Flyte once a week. Williams' second job was at KFFN, then-branded as Power 1490. He officially renamed himself R Dub! and premiered the very first edition of Sunday Night Slow Jams (then called Sunday Nite Slow Jams) on 24 July 1994. His stage name is a stylised shortening of his initials, R.W. After Power 1490 changed formats to an alternative rock station, Williams got a job at WKGN in Knoxville, Tennessee, which he described as the "worst six months of [his] life", citing loneliness, unkind coworkers and inadequate pay. Once his lease expired, he was employed at the bilingual KOHT in Tucson.

After six months at KOHT, the station was purchased by Art Laboe. Due to Laboe's unpopular changes, Williams, supported by much of the KOHT staff, launched KSJM, branded Power 97.5, to directly compete with KOHT. Within about nine months, Power 97.5 had surpassed them in ratings. Despite this, Power 97.5 was bought out within a year, and Williams signed on with Tucson's KRQQ. In 2001, KRQQ's owner, Clear Channel Entertainment, purchased KOHT, and Williams was rehired as program director and afternoon host; Sunday Night Slow Jams also followed. Williams later grew fond of Laboe and described him as a mentor.

In 2002, Sunday Night Slow Jams was syndicated in Nogales, Arizona and Tulsa, Oklahoma. That same year, Williams founded Fusion Radio Networks as Sunday Night Slow Jams added several new affiliates over the next few years. By 2005, Sunday Night Slow Jams was syndicated in three countries. Williams served as program director of several Clear Channel Entertainment-owned radio stations in Tucson until 2007 when he moved to Los Angeles to serve as program director of KRRL (then KHHT-FM) until March 2009 when he commenced a two-year sabbatical and moved to Brazil. In 2011, Williams moved to San Diego, California, where he currently resides, to work as program director of XHRM-FM and XHITZ-FM.

In January 2017, Williams launched Slow Jams 4 Kids in collaboration with the non-profit Water 4 Kids International, with the aim of crowdfunding money to provide children in Africa with water. In February, Williams hosted a Super Bowl promotion for XHITZ called EPIC 48 that included skydiving, a chartered flight to the Super Bowl and a meet-and-greet with Lady Gaga. A second drive for Slow Jams 4 Africa commenced on 26 January 2018, to provide the village of Aminit in the Bukedea District, Eastern Region in Uganda with a water well.

== Republic of Slowjamastan ==
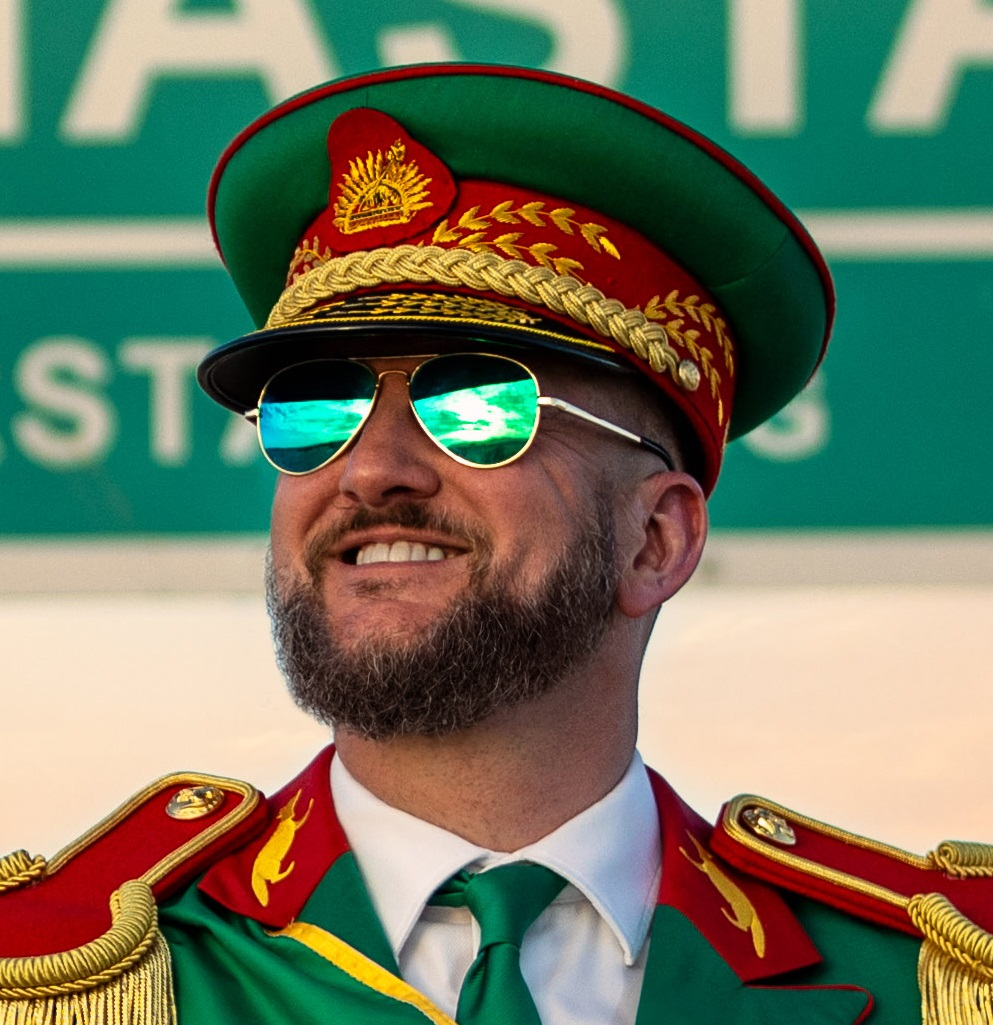
Williams as "Sultan of Slowjamastan".

Williams serves as the self-proclaimed sultan of his own micronation, the Republic of Slowjamastan, located in Imperial County, Southern California. He became inspired to create his own model country after visiting the Republic of Molossia, another micronation in Dayton, Nevada, in August 2021. When he returned from the trip he immediately began working on plans for his own micronation, purchasing an 11.07 acres (4.48 ha) plot of desert land in October for US$19,000. On 1 December, he declared the Republic of Slowjamastan an independent state. Although Slowjamastan has no building structures, it contains a large border sign beside the California State Route 78 highway, a border control post and an open desk that serves as Williams' office. There are plans for expanding the territory.

Williams has represented Slowjamastan at events in the micronational community such as MicroCon and the 2024 NATO summit in Washington, D.C.

== Travel ==
Williams is one of at least 250 people to have visited all 193 United Nations member states. He maintains a blog on his travels under the name Ramblin' Randy. Williams has also visited both United Nations observer states, Kiribati and Vatican City, and the partially recognized states of Kosovo, Taiwan, Transnistria, and Western Sahara. Williams visited his final country, Turkmenistan, on 8 May 2023. Turkmenistan had only resumed tourism in March 2023 after the country was closed in March 2020 in response to the COVID-19 pandemic. While he was expecting Turkmenistan to be anti-climactic, he enjoyed it immensely and called it among his "top three trips and countries of [his] entire life".

Inspired by his visit to Brazil, Williams' first goal was to visit all countries in Central and South America, excluding the Caribbean, before he turned 40—which he completed. Williams combined vacation time and other paid time off—such as public holidays—to best optimise his travels, which he mapped out on spreadsheets. He once visited 14 countries in Africa within 21-days. Outside of the United States, Williams' longest trip was to Brazil when he moved there for two years, and his shortest time spent was in French Guiana—an overseas department of France—where he had to depart on the same day of his arrival.

Speaking on his travels, Williams appeared in an episode of The Kelly Clarkson Show on 1 May 2023, where he stated his favourite food was from Lebanon and that the most hospitable people were from the Philippines.

== Bibliography ==
- Coast to Coast: The Radio DJ’s Syndication How-To Guide. 2009. ISBN 978-055-71092-58.
- Go Syndicate Yourself!: From Local to National: Six Steps and Countless Secrets to Radio Syndication. 2020. ISBN 979-866-69213-57.

== Filmography ==
Year	Title	Role	Ref
2005	Judge Mathis	Himself	
2013	Shark Tank	Himself	
2023	The Kelly Clarkson Show	Himself	
