= Grupo Cadena =

Grupo Cadena, formerly known as Cadena Baja California, was a media company based in Tijuana, Baja California, Mexico, with business offices in San Diego, California, United States. CBC had media properties located in Tijuana, Ensenada, Tecate and Mexicali.

Grupo Cadena Corporate Logo

== History ==
CBC, began in 1936 with the establishment of radio station XEBG-AM in Tijuana, followed in 1950 by XEDX-AM in Ensenada, XEMBC-AM in Mexicali in 1964, and XEWV-FM in 1974.

In 1990, CBC established its first television station, XHBJ-TV channel 45 in the city of Tijuana.

In 1994, XHMORE-FM began broadcasting; the station currently carries a Rock en Español format as "More FM 98.9", since September 2010. The More FM branding and format would later be carried over to XEWV-FM Mexicali on September 9, 2011.

Also part of the CBC family is XESPN-AM; formerly an affiliate of ESPN Radio, the station changed to a news/talk format as "Noticias 800" on November 1, 2010.

On January 24, 2011, CBC converted "CBC Radio" stations XEBG-AM, XEMBC-AM and Ensenada station XEDX-AM to a new news/talk format, under the "Cadena" branding. XESPN was later also rebranded as Cadena 800 AM.

In November 2019, XHBJ ceased to be a Televisa broadcaster and was renamed ¨45 TV Tijuana¨ with programming from Multimedios TV, XHILA-TDT Mexicali and news cuts from the ¨Cadena¨ news department. And a show from its sister station MORE FM 98/9.

In January 2020 XEWV-FM changed its format, from MORE FM to Suena FM with pop music in Spanish.

On May 22, 2022 Tijuana XESPN-AM 800 kHz XEBG-AM 1550 kHz XHMORE-FM 98.9 MHz & Mexicali XEMBC-AM 1190 kHz went off the air and its programming is online-only.

== Stations ==
Callsign	Frequency / Channel	Location	Format	Branding	Founded	Acquired
XEBG-AM	1550 kHz	Tijuana	English Classic	Estéreo Baja 1550	1936	1936
XHMORE-FM	98.9 MHz	Tijuana	Regional Mexican / Reggaeton	Party Mix	1977	1977
XESPN-AM	800 kHz	Tijuana	Spanish Adult hits	Norte 800	1965	1965
XHBJ-TDT	44 (45.1)	Tijuana	Multimedios / Canal 66	45 TV Tijuana	1990	1990
XEMBC-AM	1190 kHz	Mexicali	Regional Mexican	Norteñisima 1190	1964	1964
XEWV-FM	106.7 MHz	Mexicali	Regional Mexican / Reggaeton	Party Mix	1965	1974
XHDX-FM	100.3 MHz	Ensenada	Regional Mexican	La Calurosa	1959	1959

Cadena also formerly owned XEMMM-AM in Mexicali, which began as XEWV-AM in 1955 and was acquired along with XEWV-FM in 1974. CBC sold XEMMM to Organización Editorial Mexicana's ABC Radio division in 2004.
