= KCUG =

KCUG may refer to:

- KCUG-LP, a low-power radio station (100.3 FM) licensed to serve Omaha, Nebraska, United States
