= XEMBC-AM =

Radio station in Mexicali, Baja California

- Mexicali, Baja California; Mexico
- Frequency: 1190 kHz
- Branding: Estereo Baja 1190

Programming
- Format: Pop, Rock Classic

Ownership
- Owner: Grupo Cadena; (Mario Enrique Mayans Camacho)
- Operator: Esquina 32
- Sister stations: XEWV-FM

History
- First air date: November 16, 1964
- Call sign meaning: Mexicali, Baja California

Technical information
- Licensing authority: CRT
- Class: C
- Power: 250 watts day/100 watts night

Links
- Website: estereobaja.mx/mexicali/

XEMBC-AM is a radio station on 1190 AM in Mexicali, Baja California, Mexico. It airs as a Pop & Rock Classic music format, known as Estereo Baja. It is operated by Esquina 32.

== History ==
XEYW-AM received its first concession on November 16, 1964. It was owned by Mario Marcos Mayans, the founder of Cadena Baja California and broadcast as a 250-watt daytimer. By the end of the decade, the call sign had been changed to XEMBC-AM.

On May 22, 2022, all Grupo Cadena stations ceased broadcasting on AM, becoming online-only stations. It did not begin coming back on the air until April 2023, after the Cadena stations were sold to a consortium related to Tijuana news website Esquina 32. In 2024, it was replaced by Estereo Baja 1190, just like its sister stations XEBG-AM 1550 AM and XESPN-AM Norte 800 AM.
