= More FM (disambiguation) =

More FM may refer to:

- More FM in New Zealand
- XHMORE-FM, a radio station in Mexico branded as More FM
- WBEB, a radio station in Philadelphia, Pennsylvania formerly branded as More FM
