= Smooth R&B =

Smooth R&B is mellow R&B.

- Smooth jazz - a mellower type of jazz, similar to R&B.
- Slow jam - a ballad commonly marketed as R&B; sometimes has overlap with smooth jazz.
- Urban adult contemporary - a radio format consisting mostly of R&B music. Some radio stations use "Smooth R&B" as their branding or tagline.
