= XEWW-AM =

Radio station in Rosarito, Baja California, Mexico

- Rosarito, Baja California; Mexico
- Broadcast area: San Diego–Tijuana; Greater Los Angeles; Southern California; Baja California
- Frequency: 690 kHz
- Branding: La Gigante

Programming
- Language: Spanish
- Format: Talk radio

Ownership
- Owner: W3 Comm Concesionaria, SA de CV
- Operator: Primer Sistema de Noticias

History
- First air date: January 7, 1934
- Former call signs: XEAC-AM (1934–1957); XEAK-AM (1957–1961); XETRA-AM (1961–2007)
- Call sign meaning: former affiliate of XEW's "W Radio" format

Technical information
- Licensing authority: CRT
- Class: B
- Power: 77,000 watts (day); 50,000 watts (night)
- Transmitter coordinates: 32°17′52″N 117°1′48″W

Links
- Webcast: Listen live
- Website: psn.si

XEWW-AM (690 AM) is a radio station licensed to the Rosarito/Tijuana area of Baja California, Mexico. XEWW airs a Spanish language talk format. It is known as La Gigante. This station is owned by W3 Comm Concesionaria, SA de CV and operated by Primer Sistema de Noticias.

== Transmitter ==
XEWW is a high-powered Class A station, with its 77,000-watt daytime signal sometimes reaching as far as the middle of the San Joaquin Valley. It covers nearly all of Southern California and most of Baja California. XEWW operates with 50,000 watts at night as is required by the "Rio Treaty". This same treaty would normally allow XEWW to operate with a daytime signal of 100,000 watts. However, 77,000 watts was apparently selected as this power sends the equivalent of the station's former 50,000-watt daytime signal (from its original Tijuana site, since demolished) towards Los Angeles without also increasing its prohibited overlap with KIRN (670 AM) in Simi Valley and KSPN (710 AM) in Los Angeles (from its present Rosarito site).

At night it uses a five-tower array directional antenna, decreasing power to 50,000 watts to protect CBU Vancouver, British Columbia, and CKGM Montreal. Both are the dominant Class A stations on AM 690. Despite the directional antenna pattern, the signal can be heard in most of the Southwestern United States at night. While AM 690 is programmed for the U.S. side of the border, the present Rosarito transmitter facility strongly favors service to Baja California, with a signal that extends further south than north, due to protections to avoid interference with Canadian stations on 690.

== History ==
=== XEAC and XEAK ===
XEAC began broadcasting from the Agua Caliente resort in Tijuana on January 7, 1934. It broadcast on 820 or 815 kilohertz. By 1936, the station was owned by Jorge Rivera. In 1938, it was listed as transmitting on 980 kHz with 5,000 watts.

NARBA prompted a major shuffling of radio station frequencies, and XEAC wound up on 690 kHz. More than 15 years later, this would play a vital role in changes at the station. In the early 1950s, XEAC spawned a television station, which was initially assigned the callsign XEAC-TV but changed to XETV before signing on.

In 1957, a new group known as California Broadcasters, Inc., with headquarters in the Knickerbocker Hotel in Hollywood, was formed by Rivera to manage U.S. sales and programming rights to the station, which changed its call letters that year from XEAC to XEAK. In 1958, the concession for XEAC was sold to Radiodifusora del Pacífico, S.A.

While XEAC had continued to operate with 5,000 watts, it was easy to upgrade it to 50,000, as protection of Canadian Class I-A CBF Montreal would be relatively straightforward—as happened in the change from XEAC to XEAK. Ultimately, the Tijuana-based AM 690 was assigned Class I-B status. XEAK was known as "The Mighty 690", a moniker that its XETRA-AM successor used in later years. The Mighty 690 was a Top 40 station, playing the biggest hits in the U.S.

=== Enter Gordon McLendon ===
In 1961, radio maverick Gordon McLendon obtained enough financial control of the U.S. subsidiary to assert control over the station's programming. McLendon, working with the concessionaire, had the transmitter moved closer to the beach at its present Rosarito site, improving its conductivity in Los Angeles. He also installed one of the first all-news radio formats in the United States. On May 6, 1961, XEAK yielded to XETRA (always written XTRA in the United States press and only announced as such in Spanish during station IDs), known as "X-TRA News" and describing itself as "everywhere over Los Angeles".

X-TRA News was a primarily "rip-and-read" operation in which two anchors traded off fifteen-minute shifts reading the Associated Press and United Press International news wires. Originally with a very stern hard news format, it slowly broadened its focus in its time on air and added more local news features from Los Angeles.

As a border blaster competing with U.S. radio stations, the Southern California Broadcasters Association challenged the operation of XETRA News as deceptive because it created association with Los Angeles though it was not a station licensed there. It threatened Federal Communications Commission action, to which McLendon responded by floating a potential antitrust lawsuit. Listeners, however, didn't care. McLendon boasted in 1965 that it had more listeners than KNX; by 1966, XETRA boasted a staff of 50.

On March 11, 1968, KFWB (980 AM) switched to all-news, pushing XETRA out of the format. McLendon knew he could not compete with KFWB; soon after, XETRA changed to an automated beautiful music format paired with McLendon's KOST in Los Angeles. By the mid '70s, McLendon had divested his interest to the concessionaire.

=== XETRA in the 1970s and 1980s ===
AM stereo was first demonstrated on XETRA in the 1960s using the Kahn independent sideband system. These early attempts actually required the listener to tune in with two radios, one off-tuned to the left of the frequency for the left channel and the second radio off-tuned to the right, as AM stereo radios capable of decoding the Kahn signal were never licensed or built at the time. Later tests were run via US and Canadian-based stations. AM 690 is no longer operating in AM stereo.

In succeeding decades, XETRA switched formats numerous times. During most of the 1970s, XETRA continued as a beautiful music station, competing for San Diego listeners with KJQY on the FM dial. As the easy listening format began to decline in the late 1970s, on September 19, 1980, XETRA switched back to Top 40, once again billing itself as "the Mighty 690". Later, the station switched to an oldies format, calling itself "69 XTRA Gold".

=== XTRA Sports ===
Shortly after, XETRA had a brief stint as a news/talk station, carrying syndicated programs such as Rush Limbaugh, before becoming one of the U.S.'s first all-sports stations, billing as "XTRA Sports". It became an ESPN Radio Network affiliate.

For a number of years, the station was the broadcast home of the San Diego Chargers National Football League team. The station also briefly carried Stanford University football. The out-of-market team was carried because the son of station manager John Lynch was on scholarship with the team. The younger John Lynch would go on to star on various NFL teams.

In 1996, the concession for XETRA was transferred to XETRA Comunicaciones, S.A. de C.V. In the latter part of the 1990s and most of the 2000s, XETRA simulcast with Los Angeles station KXTA to give listeners in the Los Angeles area two frequencies to hear the programming.

The station's best-known sportscaster on XETRA was Lee "Hacksaw" Hamilton, who hosted a nightly sports talk program from 1987 until 2005, and was also the play-by-play voice of the Chargers from 1987 to 1996. Hacksaw is famous (and infamous) for his "best 15 minutes in radio" with "Hacksaw's Headlines" and using such phrases as "I am bleeping brilliant!" Nationally syndicated sports talk host Jim Rome also got his start on the station. He sometimes referred to this station as the "Nifty 650" on his show despite the fact that it is not on 650 kHz. Jeanne Zelasko also started at the station, broadcasting during breaks with traffic, weather and sports highlights.

=== End of the sports format and Clear Channel operations ===
In 2005, Clear Channel Communications, which managed the station, chose to drop the all-sports format and replace it with adult standards, in a format and branding swap with Clear Channel-owned 570 KLAC in Los Angeles. KLAC now calls itself "AM 570 LA Sports".

In 2006, Clear Channel ceased management of the station after the Federal Communications Commission ruled that the stations licensed to Mexico had to be counted against the U.S. ownership caps (three AM stations and five FM stations). Since Clear Channel managed several Mexican-licensed stations aimed at the San Diego market, this was counted against the company's ownership limit under this ruling. Management interest of some of these outlets, including XETRA-FM, XHRM-FM, and XHITZ-FM, was spun off into Finest City Broadcasting, owned by a former Clear Channel executive.

However, management rights for XETRA-AM were sold to a firm called Grupo Latino de Radio—an American subsidiary of Grupo PRISA, which is also the 50 percent owner of Televisa Radio and which would hold a 49 percent stake in the concessionaire—which returned XETRA's previous format.

=== Spanish-language talk ===
The first day of broadcasts of "W Radio" was February 6, 2006. Much of the programming was supplied by XEW-AM in Mexico City, which also syndicates its talk shows to other co-owned stations around Mexico.

Effective December 19, 2007, AM 690's call letters were changed to XEWW to reflect the "W Radio" programming. The change retired the "XETRA" call letters on AM radio after nearly a half-century, though XETRA-FM continued to use them.

On November 24, 2012, XEWW was used as an overflow station for an English-language broadcast of a USC Trojans football game against Notre Dame. Normal flagship station KSPN could not air the game due to conflicts with a Los Angeles Lakers basketball game, while KLAA was, as part of a separate contract, carrying the same game from Notre Dame's radio network.

XEWW had carried C.D. Guadalajara soccer team broadcasts. CD Chivas USA of Major League Soccer aired its games on XEWW until 2014.

XEWW was also the overflow station for English-language Los Angeles Lakers NBA basketball games when there was a conflict with another game that aired on KSPN. USC Trojans football and men's basketball games moved over to KABC at the start of the 2019–20 season.

=== Chinese-language programming ===
In July 2018, the station's lease was sold to H&H USA; the station flipped to a Chinese-language format as URadio 690, broadcasting programming news, talk, and music programming in Mandarin and Cantonese. The station's programming originated from studios in Irwindale, California. The studio is owned by Phoenix Radio — a subsidiary of the Chinese partially state-owned media company Phoenix Television — who produces the programming aired by XEWW, and holds a minority share in H&H USA.

In 2020, concerns were raised over the station by senator Ted Cruz, who alleged that the station was broadcasting Chinese government propaganda targeting Chinese Americans. A factor in the allegations was Phoenix's ownership of H&H, as the company itself is partially owned by entities connected to the Government of China. Cruz proposed an amendment to the Communications Act of 1934, that would prohibit the sale of FCC-licensed stations to owners who intend to change the language in which they broadcast, unless they certify that they are not "subject to undue influence by a foreign government or a political party in power in a foreign country". The station had been operating under a special temporary authority to originate from studios in the United States, pending a formal approval by the FCC.

On June 23, 2020, the FCC dismissed the application for XEWW to be operated from the United States by H&H, as the application failed to properly attribute the involvement of Phoenix Television in the station's operation. The FCC ruling stated that "Phoenix Radio's known activities at this broadcast programming studio are such that, without reviewing its role as an applicant, the FCC could not evaluate the proposed service." The station then began airing a loop of programming which lasted three years.

=== Radio Resources programming ===
In May 2023, H&H began supplying English-language programming to XEWW in partnership with syndicator Radio Resources, Inc. Some of the music was cover versions or remixes of popular songs. XEWW did not air commercials but continued to air Mexican PSAs.

=== Return to Spanish-language talk ===
On October 14, 2023, XEWW returned to Spanish-language talk as "La Voz del Pueblo" ("The Voice of the People"), leased by Primer Sistema de Noticias, the media company of former Baja California governor Jaime Bonilla Valdez. Several AM stations air PSN's programming, which is also heard on XHPRS-FM 105.7 and XHBJ-TDT 45.1.

== See also ==
- AM stereo
- Border blaster
