= XETRA-FM =

Alternative rock radio station in Tijuana

- Tijuana, Baja California; Mexico
- Broadcast area: San Diego–Tijuana
- Frequency: 91.1 MHz
- Branding: 91X

Programming
- Language: English
- Format: Classic alternative

Ownership
- Owner: Comunicación XERSA, S.A. de C.V.
- Operator: Local Media San Diego, LLC
- Sister stations: XHITZ-FM, XHRM-FM

History
- First air date: 1968 (on 91.3 MHz)
- Former frequencies: 91.3 MHz (1968–1978)
- Call sign meaning: Extra

Technical information
- Licensing authority: CRT
- Class: C
- ERP: 100,000 watts
- HAAT: 145.8 meters (478 ft)

Links
- Webcast: Listen Live
- Website: 91x.com

XETRA-FM (91.1 FM), branded as 91X, and sometimes identified as XTRA-FM, is an English-language radio station licensed to Tijuana, Baja California, Mexico. It airs an alternative rock radio format. The studios and offices are on Cornerstone Court in San Diego's Sorrento Valley neighborhood. The station is one of three Mexican outlets programmed by Local Media San Diego LLC, along with XHITZ-FM and XHRM-FM, in which an affiliated company owns a 49 percent non-voting stake. It is Mexico's first alternative radio station, and has influenced other radio stations (including XHMORE-FM) to create the Spanish-language rock radio format in 1994.

As a Mexican station, XETRA-FM must carry mandated public service announcements, most of which are translated into English by 91X, electoral advertising, the Mexican National Anthem at midnight and 5 a.m. daily, and La Hora Nacional on Sunday nights. The station transmits with an effective radiated power of 100,000 watts. It is considered a border blaster, covering the majority of San Diego County, as well as southwestern Riverside County, from its tower located atop Mount San Antonio in Tijuana. Its normal propagation reaches into southern portions of Orange County, but has been received as far north as Ridgecrest in Kern County due to tropospheric ducting.

== History ==
=== Formation and early years ===
On November 20, 1968, Radiodifusora del Pacífico, S.A. de C.V., then-owner of AM 690 XETRA (now XEWW), received a concession for a new FM station with the call sign, XETRA-FM on 91.3 MHz. At first, the station broadcast with 3,000 watts from the AM transmitter site in Playas de Rosarito.

==== Album-oriented rock (1978–1983) ====
In 1978, XETRA-FM's programming and sales rights were purchased by the San Diego–based Noble Broadcast Group. On September 5, 1978, XETRA-FM moved to 91.1 MHz and began broadcasting with 100,000 watts from a new transmitter site atop Mount San Antonio. The signal was aimed squarely at the San Diego radio market. XETRA-FM programmed an album-oriented rock (AOR) format. Initially, programming was recorded at the downtown San Diego studios in the Harcourt, Brace, Jovanovich Building and driven across the border to the transmitter site several times a day. That proved to be unworkable. Disc jockeys then began commuting from San Diego to Tijuana for each shift.

In 1979, Frank Felix started consulting programming at 91X. His format was based on a highly rated concept he developed as Programming Director at KBPI. His programming list consisted of 239 AOR tracks and deemphasized DJ personality and station promotions. "Every time a jock opens his mouth, he runs the chance of alienating someone," Felix said. "Most promotions are designed to sell a record album or record company, or to help out the sales department, none of which are my concerns. My concern is Arbitron." Ultimately, AOR would not last on 91X, and then-Executive Vice President and General Manager John Lynch would again reformat the station a few years later.

==== Introduction of modern rock format (1983–1985) ====
On January 11, 1983, at 6 p.m., 91X followed in the footsteps of KROQ-FM in Los Angeles and flipped to the "Rock of the 80s" modern rock format. KROQ Program Director Rick Carroll was hired as station consultant. 91X played "Stairway to Heaven" by Led Zeppelin as the final song of the AOR format. Immediately afterward, John Lynch made the announcement of the format change, and DJ Todd Ralston went right into "Sex (I'm a ...)" by Berlin. Former 91X on-air personality Jim LaMarca recounts the transition:

"The day 91X (then known as XETRA-FM) went "Rock of the 80s," almost no one knew it was coming, so there was no speculation. An air staff meeting was called for 3 pm. These really straight liner-card jocks were sitting around the conference room when in walks wild Rick Carroll with a cardboard box. He dumps it on the table and says, 'I'm Rick from Los Angeles and this is your new format.' The first song was played at 6 p.m. by Todd Tolkoff who was given the name Mad Max. He said, 'This is 91X "Rock of the 80s" and this is "Sex" from Berlin.' Everyone at the station (remember, he is now in Mexico 30 minutes away) thought this song was too weird. It seemed slow and goofy, but hey this was all new to us. It also took forever. Well no wonder, he was playing a long-play version so the LP should have been playing at 45 rpm. Since we had never heard the song no one knew. This happened a lot."

The "Rock of the '80s" format eventually evolved to the alternative music format of today. Towards the end of the 1980s, 91X dropped the "Rock of the '80s" branding in favor of a new tagline, "The Cutting Edge of Rock." The format would remain largely unchanged.

=== Ownership and programming changes ===
==== John Lynch/Noble Broadcasting (1985–1996) ====
In 1985, Noble Broadcast Group's owner, Ed Noble, died. Following this, Lynch, who had continued to manage 91X's programming operations, purchased the company. Under Lynch's management, 91X was one of the top-rated and most influential alternative stations in America throughout the 1980s and 1990s.

==== Jacor Communications (1996–1999) ====
On February 6, 1996, Jacor Communications announced plans to acquire Noble Broadcast Group Inc, including the U.S. marketing and operating rights to 91X, for $152 million. The acquisition was completed later the same year; simultaneously, the Mexican concession was transferred to XETRA Comunicaciones, S.A. de C.V.

==== Clear Channel Communications (1999–2005) ====
In 1999, Jacor was acquired by Clear Channel Communications. The modern rock format of 91X was retained, but tweaked to prevent overlap with Clear Channel's other San Diego rock outlets KIOZ and KGB-FM.

In 2005, the FCC amended its ownership rules to make leases of foreign stations attributable to ownership within the U.S. market they serve; this placed Clear Channel over the FCC's 8-station limit for the San Diego market. This also included LMA deals on domestic stations. Because of this, Clear Channel was forced to spin off the operating rights to 3 of its Mexican stations.

A new entity was formed to operate XETRA-FM, along with sister stations XHRM-FM and XHITZ, and a wall was put up in Clear Channel's San Diego office to physically separate studios, operations, and staff of the newly formed cluster. A new entrance was built at the back of the building to access the studios for the divested stations.

=== Return to local ownership ===
==== Finest City Broadcasting (2005–2009) ====
Finest City Broadcasting, a new company under the direction of former Clear Channel San Diego VP/Market Manager Mike Glickenhaus, took over operations of three of the four Mexican stations; Clear Channel temporarily retained the fourth, XHOCL-FM, before selling it to MVS Radio. Simultaneously, the concession was transferred to a new company, Comunicación XERSA, S.A. de C.V., owned 51% by silent Mexican investors and 49% by a Mexican company owned by Finest City (Controladora Finest City, S. de R.L. de C.V.). Glickenhaus left FCB in May 2007.

==== Local Media San Diego acquisition (2010) ====
In December 2009, Finest City, faced with considerable debt and foreclosure, was forced to put the entire cluster up for sale after defaulting on a loan. On January 7, 2010, Local Media of America LLC, backed by private equity firm Thoma Bravo, emerged as the buyer in the foreclosure sale. John Lynch, who had previously owned and operated XETRA-FM and its sister station XETRA (now XEWW-AM), was named CEO of Local Media and took control of operations for XETRA-FM, XHITZ, and XHRM-FM. Lynch simultaneously owned Broadcast Company of the Americas, another cluster of border blaster stations in the San Diego/Tijuana market. Operations between the two companies were combined during this period of time, essentially creating a single larger cluster. Later the same year, the partnership dissolved and the two companies split operations. LMA then rebranded itself as Local Media San Diego LLC to reflect its focus on the San Diego market.

As of 2022, Local Media San Diego continues to operate 91X and its sister stations.

==== Joint operating agreement with Midwest Television (2015–2016) ====
On October 6, 2015, Midwest Television (owners of KFMB and KFMB-FM) announced that it had entered into a joint operating agreement with Local Media San Diego LLC, forming an entity known as SDLocal, to manage their collective cluster of stations. The intent of this short-lived agreement was to "[preserve the] local ownership and operation of San Diego's top-rated radio stations". The agreement ended at the end of 2016. Local Media San Diego eventually acquired KFMB and KFMB-FM outright from Tegna, Inc. on March 17, 2020, with KFMB (AM) being concurrently divested to Clear Channel's successor, iHeartMedia; Tegna had purchased Midwest Television's stations in 2018.

=== Later history ===
In early 2019, XETRA-FM changed their slogan to "Local. Independent. Alternative." to further solidify its continued local operations, and noticeably leaned towards AAA. However, it continued to air currents in the alternative radio format.

==== Transition to classic alternative (Since 2022) ====
On February 14, 2022, XETRA-FM began running an "A to XYZ" alphabetical music marathon of the station's biggest hits from its nearly 40-year run, beginning with "A Forest" by The Cure, and concluding with “Zooropa” by U2. On the evening of February 23, following the marathon's conclusion, XETRA-FM shifted its format to one focused more on 1980/1990s classic alternative while keeping the "91X" moniker, with the new slogan "The Original"; the move was officially announced on-air at 10 a.m. the following day. The revised format continues to incorporate some current music, but otherwise de-emphasizes songs newer than the early 2000s. The "official" first song after the on-air announcement was "Once in a Lifetime" by Talking Heads.

=== Past programming and personalities ===
When Howard Stern was hosting a syndicated morning show on terrestrial radio, 91X was his original San Diego network affiliate. He was pulled from XETRA-FM in 1997 and moved to then-sister station KIOZ after Stern's discussions ran afoul of the Dirección General de Radio, Televisión y Cinematografía, Mexico's broadcast content regulator. RTC threatened to sanction XETRA-FM for airing Stern's program, which on several occasions in late 1996 included what the Mexican government believed were anti-Mexican remarks that violated the Federal Radio and Television Law.

On December 27, 2007, Chris Cantore was let go from the alternative rocker after a decade of service.

On April 1, 2008, "The 91X Morning Show", hosted by Mat Diablo, debuted after a month-long marketing campaign that centered on the question "Who is Mat Diablo?" On May 7, 2010, the "91X Morning Show" was canceled after control of XETRA-FM was transferred to BCA.

"Music In The Morning" was hosted by Oz Medina, who previously worked as 91X's Music Director and Afternoon Host from 1987 to 1993. Medina was later replaced by Matt Stone.

Until 2008, 91X aired Reggae Makossa, a program featuring reggae and roots music that is now heard on XHUAN-FM. The program was originally hosted by Makeda Dread and Demaja Le. Demaja Le left in 1998 to program KSDS. Makeda Dread still hosts the show.

Up until January 2012, 91X carried the syndicated Loveline, heard on weeknights.
