= KMOB =

KMOB may refer to:

- KMOB-LP, a low-power radio station (100.3 FM) licensed to Clearlake, California, United States
- the ICAO code for Mobile Regional Airport, in Mobile, Alabama, United States
