= Sunday Night Slow Jams =

American radio program

- Other names: Sunday Nite Slow Jams (formerly)
- Running time: 4 hours
- Country of origin: United States
- Language(s): English
- Hosted by: R Dub!
- Created by: R Dub!
- Original release: 24 July 1994 – present
- Website: slowjams.com

Sunday Night Slow Jams is an American weekly syndicated radio program dedicated to slow jams music. Created on 24 July 1994, it is directed and presented by creator R Dub!, and broadcast on more than 200 radio stations in 17 countries as of May 2023.

== Format ==
Sunday Night Slow Jams is broadcast weekly on Sundays, from 8 p.m. to 12 a.m. on most stations. Listeners can send in "Oral Expressions" expressing their love for someone.

== History ==
Randy Williams, presenter of Sunday Night Slow Jams, was hired for his first professional job in radio when he was 16; he was hired to work for KXCI in Tucson, Arizona after having previously enrolled in a disc jockey (DJ) class there. He presented a slow jam show called Nyte Flyte once a week. His second job was at KFFN, then-branded as Power 1490, where, on 24 July 1994, he would premiere the first edition of Sunday Night Slow Jams—at this point called Sunday Nite Slow Jams. He also renamed himself R Dub!, a stylised shortening of his initials, R.W.

After Power 1490 changed formats to an alternative rock station, Williams got a job at WKGN in Knoxville, Tennessee, which he described as the "worst six months of [his] life", citing loneliness, unkind coworkers and inadequate pay. Once his lease expired, he was employed at the bilingual KOHT back in Tucson. After six months at KOHT, the station was purchased by Art Laboe, but because of Laboe's unpopular changes, Williams, supported by much of the KOHT staff, launched KSJM (branded Power 97.5) as a competitor to KOHT. Within some nine months, Power 97.5 had surpassed KOHT in ratings. Despite this, Power 97.5 was bought out within a year, and Williams signed on with Tucson's KRQQ; Sunday Night Slow Jams also followed.

In 1999, Tim Richards, then-operations manager of KRQQ, called Williams "one of the best night disc jockeys in the country right now". In 2001, Clear Channel Entertainment, owner of KRQQ, purchased KOHT, and Williams was rehired as program director and afternoon host alongside presenter for Sunday Night Slow Jams. In 2002, Sunday Night Slow Jams was syndicated in Nogales, Arizona and Tulsa, Oklahoma. That same year, Williams founded Fusion Radio Networks as Sunday Night Slow Jams added several new affiliates over the next few years. By 2005, Sunday Night Slow Jams was syndicated in Hawaii, Mexico and England.

In 2013, Williams appeared on Shark Tank alongside R&B singer Brian McKnight—who performed a serenade—unsuccessfully seeking a US$75,000 investment in exchange for a ten percent equity stake in Sunday Night Slow James. As of May 2023, Sunday Night Slow Jams was broadcast on more than 200 radio stations in 17 countries.

In honor of the 30th anniversary of Sunday Night Slow Jams, San Diego Mayor Todd Gloria declared June 21 "Slow Jams Day" for the city. Mayor Regina Romero also proclaimed June 21 "Slow Jams Day" for the city of Tucson, Arizona.

== Sunday Night Slow Jams Live ==
Launched in February 1999, Sunday Night Slow Jams Live is a spinoff of the radio show. It is a live concert featuring various R&B artists.
