= John Lynch (radio) =

President and CEO of Broadcast Company of the Americas

- Born: Chicago, Illinois, U.S.
- Education: Benet Academy; Drake University
- Occupations: President and CEO of the Broadcast Company of the Americas
- Children: 2 including John Jr.
- Father: John Pershing Lynch

John Terrance Lynch, Sr. is the president and CEO of the Broadcast Company of the Americas.

== Early life ==
John Lynch grew up in suburban Chicago in an Irish-Catholic family. His grandparents were Irish immigrants. His grandparents named their son (Lynch's father) John Pershing Lynch, after the World War I general of the same name. Lynch graduated from Benet Academy in 1965, and went on to major in broadcasting at Drake University, where he also played football as linebacker and tight end. He was drafted right out of college to play linebacker for the Pittsburgh Steelers in 1969. A knee injury in the first few weeks of the season immediately ended his football career after one season, however.

== Broadcasting career ==
Following the end of his football career with the Pittsburgh Steelers, Lynch sold advertising for the Chicago Tribune and later WIND (AM), then owned by Westinghouse Radio. In 1972, he convinced his boss at Westinghouse to relocate him to San Diego and make him sales manager at KFMB AM/FM, owned by Midwest Radio and Television. He moved with his wife Cathy, whom he met in high school, and their two toddlers. The KFMB stations were struggling when Lynch began his work there, but within five years they achieved the highest ratings in the market.

In 1978, Ed Noble offered Lynch a five-percent ownership of the Noble Broadcast Group, based in San Diego. The company bought XTRA AM/FM, and the AM station became the first all-sports talk show in the US. The FM station did not do too well with its album-oriented rock programming, so Lynch switched to alternative rock instead and created 91X. Upon Noble's death in 1985, Lynch took over the company and over the following decade expanded into 20 stations throughout the nation. In 1996 he sold the company to Jacor Communications for $152 million, which was bought by Clear Channel Communications soon after. Over the next five years, a noncompete agreement barred Lynch from the radio industry, so during that time he presided over the San Diego International Sports Council and helped bring the 2008 U.S. Open Golf Championship to San Diego.

In 2003, Lynch learned from his daughter Kara Guthrie, who headed sports sales for Clear Channel, that her company decided to move XTRA Sports to Los Angeles. As XTRA Sports was the only local sports talk show in San Diego, the void and laid-off staff essentially gave Lynch a "ready-made radio station" to pick up. He and a partner from Noble established the Broadcast Company of the Americas and started Mighty 1090.

== Personal life ==
Lynch's son is the NFL's John Lynch Jr.
