= XHAGI-FM =

Community radio station in Aguililla, Michoacán

Aguililla, Michoacán, Mexico; Mexico
- Frequency: 100.3 FM
- Branding: Expresión FM Aguililla Stereo

Programming
- Format: Noncommercial community radio

Ownership
- Owner: Expresión Cultural Aguililla, A.C.

History
- First air date: 2016 (social community concession)
- Call sign meaning: AGuIlilla

Technical information
- Class: A
- ERP: 3 kW

XHAGI-FM is a community radio station in Aguililla, Michoacán, broadcasting on 100.3 FM. XHAGI is owned by Expresión Cultural Aguililla, A.C. and known as Expresión FM.

== History ==
XHAGI received its social community concession on September 23, 2016.
