= XHDX-FM =

Radio station in Ensenada, Baja California, Mexico

- Ensenada, Baja California; Mexico
- Frequency: 100.3 FM
- Branding: La Calurosa

Programming
- Format: Regional Mexican

Ownership
- Owner: Grupo Cadena; (Mario Enrique Mayans Camacho)
- Operator: Esquina 32

History
- First air date: September 19, 1959 (concession)
- Former call signs: XEDX-AM
- Former frequencies: 1010 kHz (1959–2016)

Technical information
- Licensing authority: CRT
- Class: B1
- ERP: 15,000 watts
- HAAT: 60.1 m (197 ft)
- Transmitter coordinates: 31°53′35″N 116°37′38″W

Links
- Webcast: Listen live
- Website: esquina32radio.mx

XHDX-FM is a radio station broadcasting on 100.3 FM in Ensenada, Baja California, Mexico. It is operated by Esquina 32. It airs a Regional Mexican format known as La Calurosa.

== History ==
XHDX began as XEDX-AM 1010. Its concession was awarded on September 19, 1959, to Mario Marcos Mayans, the founder of Grupo Cadena.

The station was long known as Radio Variedades before switching to news/talk in the 2000s. It briefly broadcast ESPN Deportes Radio from 2008 to 2009.

The station migrated to FM in 2011 and shut down its AM transmitter in 2016. In 2021, the station changed names from Cadena 100.3 to Variedades FM. It did not broadcast from July 2022 to early 2023, owing to financial difficulties at Grupo Cadena; Cadena had shut down broadcast operations from its Tijuana stations in May. The Cadena stations were then sold to a consortium related to Tijuana news website Esquina 32.
