= KXRF-LP =

- Dodge, North Dakota; United States
- Frequency: 100.3 MHz
- Branding: KXRF-LP 100.3 FM

Programming
- Format: Inspirational

Ownership
- Owner: The Prairie Center Broadcasting

Technical information
- Licensing authority: FCC
- Facility ID: 195708
- Class: L1
- ERP: 100 watts
- HAAT: −8 metres (−26 ft)
- Transmitter coordinates: 47°18′11″N 102°12′9″W

Links
- Public license information: LMS
- Webcast: Listen Live
- Website: Official Website

KXRF-LP (100.3 FM) is a radio station licensed to serve the community of Dodge, North Dakota, and broadcasting to Dodge, Halliday, Golden Valley, Twin Buttes, and Zap. The station is owned by The Prairie Center Broadcasting. It airs an inspirational music format.

The station was assigned the KXRF-LP call letters by the Federal Communications Commission on February 26, 2014.
