= XEWV-FM =

Radio station in Mexicali, Baja California, Mexico

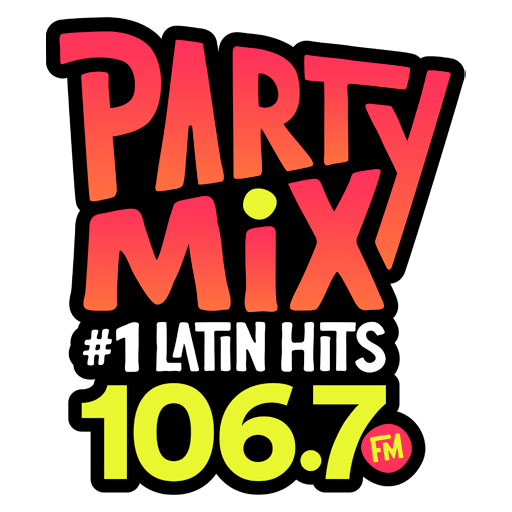
- Mexicali, Baja California; Mexico
- Frequency: 106.7 MHz
- Branding: Party Mix

Programming
- Format: Regional Mexican

Ownership
- Owner: Grupo Cadena; (Mario Enrique Mayans Camacho)
- Operator: Esquina 32
- Sister stations: XEMBC-AM

History
- First air date: 1965
- Former frequencies: 89.6 MHz
- Call sign meaning: Derived from XEWV-AM

Technical information
- Licensing authority: CRT
- Class: A
- ERP: 2.020 kW
- HAAT: 38.7 m (127 ft)

Links
- Webcast: Listen live
- Website: partymixfm.com

XEWV-FM is a radio station in Mexicali, Baja California, Mexico, broadcasting on 106.7 FM. It airs a Regional Mexican and Latin Music music format known as Party Mix.

== History ==
XEWV-FM received its concession in June 1965 for operation on 89.6 MHz. At the time, Mexico had licensed several radio stations on even decimal FM frequencies, which were never used in the United States. By 1970, all of the even decimal stations had been relocated to odd-numbered frequencies or had disappeared; XEWV was relocated to 106.7 MHz. In 1974, Cadena Baja California (now known as Grupo Cadena) bought XEWV-AM-FM.

After 27 years of regional Mexican music as Fiesta Mexicana, on September 9, 2011, XEWV-FM flipped to the More FM format, which debuted in Tijuana on sister station XHMORE-FM in 1994.

On March 23, 2020, XEWV-FM changed names and relaunched as pop station Suena FM 106.7. On May 22, 2022, Grupo Cadena ceased broadcast operations on its terrestrial stations in Mexicali. It did not begin coming back on the air until April 2023, after the Cadena stations were sold to a consortium related to Tijuana news website Esquina 32.
