= XHTF-FM =

Radio station in Monclova, Coahuila, Mexico

- Monclova, Coahuila; Mexico
- Frequency: 100.3 FM
- Branding: Estéreo Tiempo

Programming
- Format: Variety

Ownership
- Owner: Raúl Eduardo Martínez Ramón

History
- First air date: February 16, 1982 (concession)

Technical information
- Licensing authority: CRT
- Class: B1
- ERP: 5.896 kW
- HAAT: −50.75 m (−166.5 ft)

Links
- Webcast: Listen live
- Website: estereotiempo.com

XHTF-FM is a radio station on 100.3 FM in Monclova, Coahuila, Mexico, known as Estéreo Tiempo.

== History ==
XHTF received its concession on February 16, 1982. It was owned by Humberto Medina Ainslie with an ERP of 10 kW. It was sold to Martínez Ramón in 1986.
