= WHGL-FM =

- Canton, Pennsylvania; United States
- Broadcast area: Elmira-Corning area
- Frequency: 100.3 MHz
- Branding: Wiggle 100.3

Programming
- Format: Country music
- Affiliations: Townhall News

Ownership
- Owner: Cantroair Communications Inc.
- Sister stations: WTZN

History
- First air date: August 30, 1978 (as WKAD)
- Former call signs: WKAD (1978–1988)
- Call sign meaning: Sounds like "wiggle"

Technical information
- Licensing authority: FCC
- Facility ID: 8553
- Class: B1
- ERP: 3,600 watts
- HAAT: 265 meters
- Transmitter coordinates: 41°44′32.00″N 76°50′8.00″W

Links
- Public license information: Public file; LMS
- Webcast: Listen Live
- Website: wiggle100.com

WHGL-FM (100.3 MHz) is a radio station broadcasting a country music format. Licensed to Canton, Pennsylvania, United States, the station serves the Elmira-Corning, NY and Troy-Canton, PA areas. The station is currently owned by Cantroair Communications Inc. and features programming from CBS News Radio.

WHGL has one sister station: WTZN, 1310 "The Zone".

Former logo
