= Bay FM (Brisbane) =

4BAY
- Redland City, Queensland; Australia
- Broadcast area: Wynnum RA1 ()
- Frequency: 100.3 MHz FM
- Branding: Bay FM

Programming
- Language: English
- Format: Community radio

Ownership
- Owner: Bayside Community Radio Association, Inc.

History
- First air date: 5 October 1992

Technical information
- ERP: 4,000 watts
- HAAT: 195 m
- Transmitter coordinates: 27°36′56.5″S 153°12′52″E

Links
- Website: Official website

Bay FM (callsign 4BAY) is a community radio station serving Redland City near Brisbane. The not-for-profit Bayside Community Radio Association Inc. was founded in 1987 and test transmissions took place in 1989 and 1991. It was granted a community broadcasting licence in 1992 and transmissions commenced in October of that year, becoming a 24-hour operation the following month. The studio is located in Thornlands.

== See also ==
- List of radio stations in Australia
