= WTZN =

Coordinates: 41°46′51″N 76°49′09″W

- Troy, Pennsylvania; United States
- Broadcast area: Elmira, New York
- Frequency: 1310 kHz
- Branding: Golden Oldies 99.9 FM

Programming
- Format: Oldies
- Affiliations: Townhall News; Westwood One

Ownership
- Owner: WTZN; (Cantroair Communications, Inc.)

History
- First air date: 1982

Technical information
- Licensing authority: FCC
- Facility ID: 8551
- Class: D
- Power: 1,000 watts day 72 watts night
- Translator: 99.9 W260AN (Troy)

Links
- Public license information: Public file; LMS
- Webcast: Listen Live
- Website: wtzn.com

WTZN (1310 AM) is an oldies radio station in Troy, Pennsylvania, United States.

== FM Translator ==
In addition to the main station on 1310 kHz, WTZN programming is also relayed to an FM translator in order to widen its broadcast area and to provide the listener with choice of FM with high fidelity sound. The translator is owned by Cantroair Communications, Inc.

Broadcast translator for WTZN
Call sign	Frequency	City of license	FID	ERP (W)	Class	FCC info
W260AN	99.9 FM	Troy, Pennsylvania	141556	250	D	LMS
