= KCWG-LP =

- Crown King, Arizona; United States
- Frequency: 100.3 MHz

Programming
- Format: Classic Country/Gospel

Ownership
- Owner: Bradshaw Mountain Broadcasting Inc.

History
- First air date: 2004
- Call sign meaning: CroWn KinG

Technical information
- Licensing authority: FCC
- Facility ID: 133424
- Class: L1
- ERP: 1 watts
- HAAT: 736.2 meters (2415 feet)
- Transmitter coordinates: 34°13′48″N 112°21′02″W

Links
- Public license information: LMS

KCWG-LP (100.3 FM) is a radio station licensed to serve Crown King, Arizona. The station is owned by Bradshaw Mountain Broadcasting Inc. It airs a Classic Country music format. In addition to it usual music programming, the station also airs short programs featuring historical information about the local area and promotes the town of Crown King as "a nice place to camp, fish, hunt, eat and sleep-over."

The station was assigned the KCWG-LP call letters by the Federal Communications Commission on July 22, 2002.
