= Slow jam =

Subgenre of R&B and soul music

A slow jam is music with rhythm and blues and soul influences. Slow jams are commonly R&B ballads or downtempo songs, and are mostly soft-sounding with heavily emotional or romantic lyrical content. The earliest known use of the term is from a July 1, 1961 article in The Chicago Defender. The earliest song to use the term as its title is the 1983 Midnight Star recording "Slow Jam" on their album No Parking on the Dance Floor.

Essence magazine compiled a list of the "25 Best Slow Jams of All Time", containing songs of the 1970s, 1980s and 1990s, and Complex compiled a list of 100 slow jams in "The Best Songs to Get You in the Mood".

== In radio ==
In 1983, Kevin "Slow Jammin'" James created the radio show Slow Jam on WKYS, named after the Midnight Star song, then later the Weekend Slow Jam show.

In 1994, R Dub! created the radio show Sunday Night Slow Jams on Power 1490 KJYK in Tucson, AZ. Today, Sunday Night Slow Jams can be heard on over 200 radio stations in 17 countries.

In 2024, the mayors of San Diego, California and Tucson, Arizona proclaimed the date of June 21 to be "Slow Jams Day", honoring the debut broadcast of Sunday Night Slow Jams with R Dub!.

== See also ==
- List of soul ballads
- List of contemporary R&B ballads
- Republic of Slowjamastan
