= Dodge, North Dakota =

- City
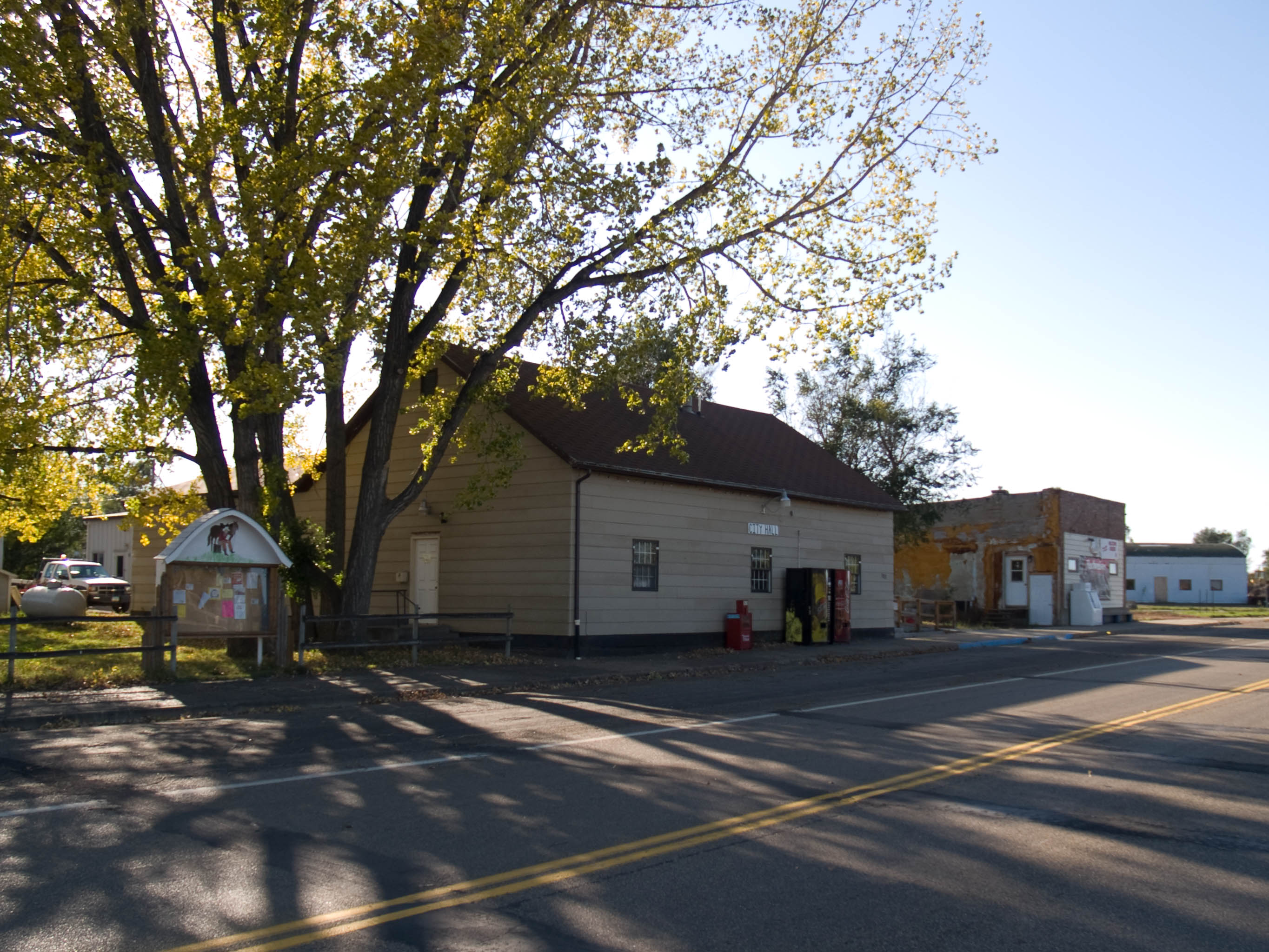
- City Hall in Dodge

- Location of Dodge, North Dakota
- Coordinates: 47°18′20″N 102°12′11″W
- Country: United States
- State: North Dakota
- County: Dunn
- Founded: 1915

Area
  - Total: 0.47 sq mi (1.21 km^{2})
  - Land: 0.47 sq mi (1.21 km^{2})
  - Water: 0 sq mi (0.00 km^{2})
- Elevation: 1,998 ft (609 m)

Population (2020)
  - Total: 89
  - Estimate (2022): 85
  - Density: 190.4/sq mi (73.52/km^{2})
- Time zone: UTC-7 (Mountain (MST))
  - Summer (DST): UTC-6 (MDT)
- ZIP code: 58625
- Area code: 701
- FIPS code: 38-19820
- GNIS feature ID: 1035994

Dodge is a city in Dunn County, North Dakota, United States. The population was 89 at the 2020 census. Dodge was founded in 1915.

== Name ==
Dodge was named after the banker G. W. Dodge of Anoka, Minnesota, who owned the site where the city was built.

== Geography ==
According to the United States Census Bureau, the city has a total area of 0.47 square miles (1.22 km^{2}), all land.

== Demographics ==
Historical population
Census	Pop.	Note	%±
1920	172		—
1930	204		18.6%
1940	234		14.7%
1950	251		7.3%
1960	226		−10.0%
1970	121		−46.5%
1980	199		64.5%
1990	135		−32.2%
2000	125		−7.4%
2010	87		−30.4%
2020	89		2.3%
2022 (est.)	85		−4.5%
U.S. Decennial Census; 2020 Census

=== 2010 census ===
As of the census of 2010, there were 87 people, 43 households, and 23 families residing in the city. The population density was 185.1 inhabitants per square mile (71.5/km^{2}). There were 67 housing units at an average density of 142.6 per square mile (55.1/km^{2}). The racial makeup of the city was 89.7% White, 9.2% Native American, and 1.1% from two or more races. Hispanic or Latino of any race were 1.1% of the population.

There were 43 households, of which 18.6% had children under the age of 18 living with them, 39.5% were married couples living together, 9.3% had a female householder with no husband present, 4.7% had a male householder with no wife present, and 46.5% were non-families. 34.9% of all households were made up of individuals, and 20.9% had someone living alone who was 65 years of age or older. The average household size was 2.02 and the average family size was 2.70.

The median age in the city was 54.3 years. 18.4% of residents were under the age of 18; 3.3% were between the ages of 18 and 24; 16% were from 25 to 44; 29.8% were from 45 to 64; and 32.2% were 65 years of age or older. The gender makeup of the city was 48.3% male and 51.7% female.

=== 2000 census ===
As of the census of 2000, there were 125 people, 50 households, and 31 families residing in the city. The population density was 267.3 inhabitants per square mile (103.2/km^{2}). There were 73 housing units at an average density of 156.1 per square mile (60.3/km^{2}). The racial makeup of the city was 97.60% White and 2.40% Native American. Hispanic or Latino of any race were 1.60% of the population.

There were 50 households, out of which 30.0% had children under the age of 18 living with them, 42.0% were married couples living together, 14.0% had a female householder with no husband present, and 38.0% were non-families. 30.0% of all households were made up of individuals, and 16.0% had someone living alone who was 65 years of age or older. The average household size was 2.50 and the average family size was 3.23.

In the city, the population was spread out, with 32.0% under the age of 18, 6.4% from 18 to 24, 21.6% from 25 to 44, 25.6% from 45 to 64, and 14.4% who were 65 years of age or older. The median age was 36 years. For every 100 females, there were 108.3 males. For every 100 females age 18 and over, there were 97.7 males.

The median income for a household in the city was $16,250, and the median income for a family was $18,750. Males had a median income of $19,688 versus $20,313 for females. The per capita income for the city was $9,077. There were 38.2% of families and 25.0% of the population living below the poverty line, including 17.9% of under eighteens and 78.9% of those over 64.
