= WRKE-LP =

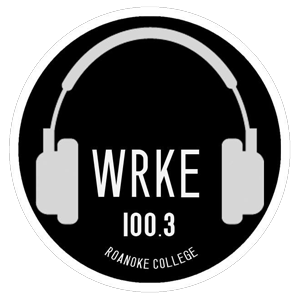
- Salem, Virginia; United States
- Broadcast area: Salem, Virginia; Roanoke, Virginia
- Frequency: 100.3 MHz
- Branding: WRKE 100.3

Programming
- Format: Variety

Ownership
- Owner: The Trustees of Roanoke College

History
- First air date: May 2, 2005
- Call sign meaning: "Roanoke"

Technical information
- Licensing authority: FCC
- Facility ID: 124498
- Class: L1
- ERP: 100 watts
- HAAT: −35.5 meters (−116 ft)
- Transmitter coordinates: 37°17′51.0″N 80°3′19.0″W

Links
- Public license information: LMS
- Webcast: Listen live
- Website: www.wrke.org

WRKE-LP is a college radio-formatted broadcast radio station licensed to Salem, Virginia, serving Salem and Roanoke in Virginia. WRKE-LP is owned and operated by Roanoke College. The station is staffed by 70 Roanoke College Students and broadcasts from the main floor of the Colket Center of Roanoke College.

== Background ==
WRKE is a student-run, non-commercial radio station licensed by the Federal Communications Commission to Roanoke College. WRKE is a advised under a professional advisory board. The station is under manager and adviser Rick Mattioni, and program director Elijah Wilhelm. The station plays on an automated system playing alternative/indie music when student DJs are not on air. Student shows vary from sports-talk, alternative, pop, or hip-hop.

== History ==
The station got its start in 1998 when Jim Goodwin formed a club to establish a radio station on campus. Equipment was obtained and the station went on the air November 2005 with music played via computer automation until students returned after winter break to establish programming and shows. The station is building a fan base on campus and beyond as far as its low power transmitter can carry. While the broadcast radius is a mere 3 miles, this covers most of the Roanoke College community. Over the summer of 2016 a new, larger, more accessible on-air studio was built on Colket's main floor just a few feet from the Center's front doors and across the hall from the Commons. The upgrade enhances WRKE's ability to conduct interviews in roomier surroundings; produce live (and recorded) specials such as election night coverage and music performances; and increases the station's visibility. Beginning in early 2017, WRKE experienced unprecedented growth resulting in the station growing from 13 students, hosting 8 shows to 75 students, hosting 34 shows. WRKE also began its live and special events during this time. Events included Outlast, a competition similar to Big Brother, live radio dramas with the theater department, and live events from down in the Cavern. For their progress WRKE, under Program Director Elijah Wilhelm, won the Student Organization of the Year award for both the 2016-17 school year and the 2017-2018 school year. This is the only time the award has been won by the same organization in back to back years.

== Programming ==
The station is DJ'd by Roanoke College students throughout the week during the academic year, and the station plays on an automated system playing alternative music when student DJs are not on air. Student shows vary from sports-talk, alternative, pop, or hip-hop. Over the past year WRKE has also expanded its speciality event programming included joint collaborations with the RC theatre and athletic departments, remote broadcasts from local businesses, live audience shows for students, radio dramas, and a reality game competition.
