= XESPN-AM =

Radio station in Tijuana, Baja California, Mexico

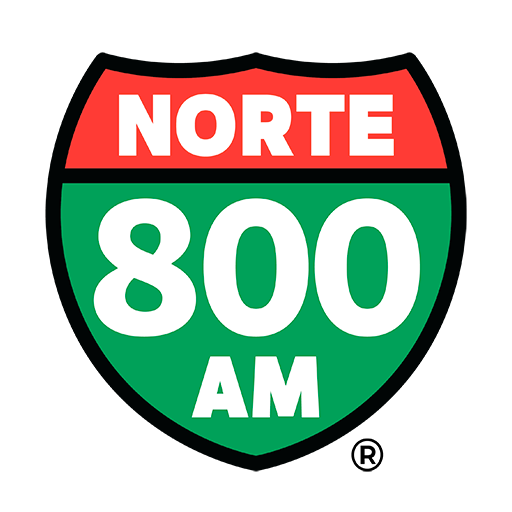
- Tijuana, Baja California; Mexico
- Broadcast area: San Diego–Tijuana
- Frequency: 800 kHz
- Branding: Norte

Programming
- Format: Spanish adult hits

Ownership
- Owner: Grupo Cadena; (Mario Enrique Mayans Camacho)
- Operator: Esquina 32
- Sister stations: XEBG-AM, XHMORE-FM

History
- First air date: April 27, 1965
- Former call signs: XEMMM-AM
- Call sign meaning: Station formerly broadcast ESPN Radio

Technical information
- Licensing authority: CRT
- Class: C
- Power: 500 watts (day); 250 watts (night)

Links
- Webcast: Listen live
- Website: norte800.mx

XESPN-AM 800 is a radio station that serves the San Diego–Tijuana area. It is operated by Esquina 32. It airs a Spanish-language adult hits music format known as Norte.

800 AM is a Mexican clear-channel frequency on which XEROK-AM in Ciudad Juárez is the dominant Class A station.

== History ==
Logo used as an ESPN Radio affiliate

The station came on air in April 1965 as XEMMM-AM, named for its owner, Mario Marcos Mayans. The Mayans family owned Cadena Baja California (CBC, later Grupo Cadena), which ran XEMMM from 1965 to 2022. The station initially broadcast during the daytime only.

XEMMM joined ESPN Radio in late 2002, replacing XETRA, which had changed from sports radio to adult standards some months earlier. In 2003, the call sign changed to XESPN. (The XEMMM calls were moved to a station Cadena Baja California then owned in Mexicali, now XEMMM-AM 940.) In 2009, ESPN Radio moved to sister FM station XHMORE while XESPN joined ESPN Deportes Radio.

On November 1, 2010, CBC ceased sports programming on XESPN and adopted a news/talk format programmed by Grupo Imagen. ESPN Deportes Radio is now available in the San Diego-Tijuana border region on XESS-AM 620. Imagen's news programming was later replaced on XESPN with programming from Radio Fórmula.

On May 22, 2022, XESPN-AM went off the air, and its programming was moved to online only. It did not begin coming back on the air until April 2023, after the Cadena stations were sold to a consortium related to Tijuana news website Esquina 32.
