= WYGB =

Radio station in Edinburgh–Columbus, Indiana

Coordinates: 39°21′45″N 85°54′23″W

- Edinburgh, Indiana; United States
- Broadcast area: Columbus, Franklin, Greenwood and Shelbyville, Indiana
- Frequency: 100.3 MHz
- Branding: KORN Country 100.3

Programming
- Format: Country music
- Affiliations: Premiere Networks

Ownership
- Owner: Reising Radio Partners, Inc.

Technical information
- Licensing authority: FCC
- Facility ID: 18668
- Class: A
- ERP: 4,900 watts
- HAAT: 110 meters (360 ft)

Links
- Public license information: Public file; LMS
- Webcast: Listen Live
- Website: korncountry.com

WYGB (100.3 FM) is a radio station broadcasting a country music format. Licensed to Edinburgh, Indiana, the station serves the areas of Columbus, Indiana; Franklin, Indiana; Greenwood, Indiana; and Shelbyville, Indiana, and is owned by Reising Radio Partners, Inc.

== Gallery ==
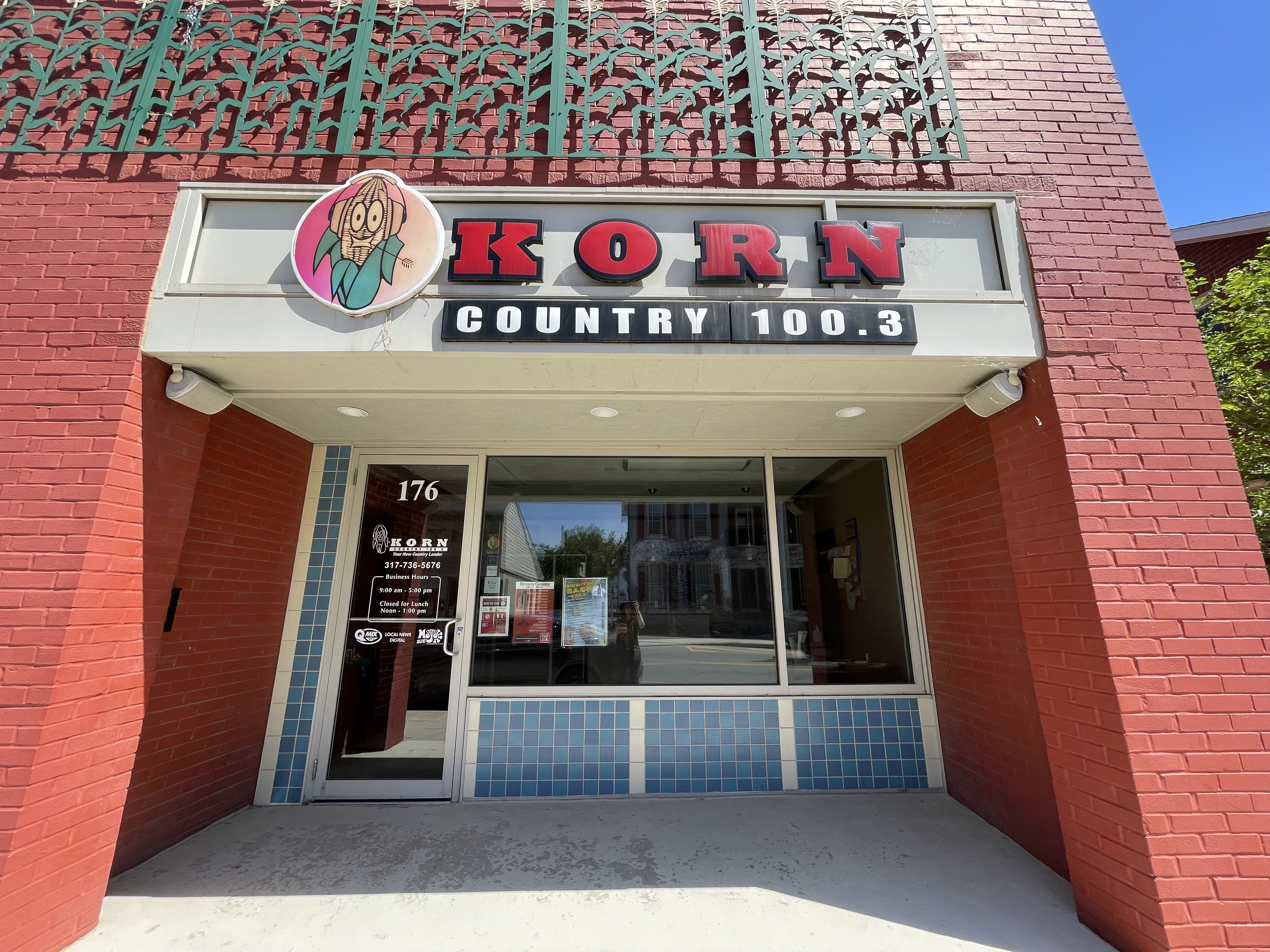
WYGB in Franklin, Indiana in 2022.
