= KWAW =

Radio station in Garapan, Saipan, Northern Mariana Islands

- Garapan-Saipan, Northern Mariana Islands; United States
- Broadcast area: Northern Mariana Islands
- Frequency: 100.3 MHz
- Branding: Magic 100.3

Programming
- Format: Rhythmic contemporary

Ownership
- Owner: Leon Padilla Ganacias

History
- First air date: January 15, 1999
- Former call signs: KPXH

Technical information
- Licensing authority: FCC
- Facility ID: 12587
- Class: C3
- ERP: 1,100 watts
- HAAT: 461 meters (1512 feet)
- Transmitter coordinates: 15°11′05″N 145°44′26″E

Links
- Public license information: Public file; LMS

KWAW, (100.3 FM) operated as Magic 100.3 is a radio station broadcasting a Rhythmic contemporary music format. Licensed to Garapan-Saipan, Northern Mariana Islands, the station is currently owned by Leon Padilla Ganacias. The station's studios are located on the second floor of the RJ Commercial Building in lower Dandan.

Magic 100.3 plays multiple genres including: Country to Dance, Hip-Hop to Classical, Jazz to Alternative, Rock to Folk, Blues to Ethnic, and much more.

Contributed Radio Announcers: DJ Anjhel, Magic Man, Doctor Love, DJ Jimmy B, DJ RV, DJ Zyra, DJ Glen Manglona, DJ M, DJ Dy, DJ Belle, DJ Prod, DJ Kim, DJ NCage, DJ Sun and DJ Condrick.

The station was assigned the KWAW call letters by the Federal Communications Commission on January 15, 1999.
