= WLML-FM =

Radio station in Lake Park, Florida

- Lake Park, Florida; United States
- Broadcast area: The Palm Beaches
- Frequency: 100.3 MHz
- Branding: Legends 100.3

Programming
- Format: Adult standards

Ownership
- Owner: Robinson Entertainment LLC

History
- First air date: February 22, 2014
- Call sign meaning: Where Legendary Music Lives

Technical information
- Licensing authority: FCC
- Facility ID: 191525
- Class: A
- ERP: 4,000 watts
- HAAT: 115 meters (377 ft)
- Transmitter coordinates: 26°45′42.0″N 80°04′42.0″W

Links
- Public license information: Public file; LMS
- Webcast: Listen live
- Website: legendsradio.com

WLML-FM (100.3 MHz, "Legends 100.3") is an adult standards radio station licensed to Lake Park, Florida, serving West Palm Beach, Florida. Artists include Frank Sinatra, Michael Bublé, Dean Martin, Ella Fitzgerald and Diana Krall. Co-owner Dick Robinson, who is a nighttime host, started the Connecticut School of Broadcasting and hosts a syndicated standards program. Robinson also started the Society for the Preservation of the Great American Songbook. Afternoon DJ Lorna O'Connell is a veteran of the West Palm Beach radio market.
