= CFAQ-FM =

Christian radio station in Saskatoon, Saskatchewan

Coordinates: 52°08′34″N 106°25′53″W

- Saskatoon, Saskatchewan; Canada
- Broadcast area: Saskatoon metropolitan area
- Frequency: 100.3 MHz
- Branding: Anointed 100.3

Programming
- Format: Christian music

Ownership
- Owner: Bertor Communications

History
- First air date: 2006
- Call sign meaning: Christ FAQ

Technical information
- Class: LP
- ERP: 36 W
- HAAT: 105.9 metres (347 ft)

Links
- Website: saskatoonchristianradio.com

CFAQ-FM is a Canadian radio station, airing a Christian music format at 100.3 FM in Saskatoon, Saskatchewan. Launched in 2006 by Bertor Communications, the station is branded as Anointed 100.3 FM.
