= CIHW-FM =

First Nations radio station in Wendake, Quebec

Coordinates: 46°52′03″N 71°21′43″W

- Wendake, Quebec; Canada
- Frequency: 100.3 MHz

Programming
- Format: Community radio

Ownership
- Owner: Comité de la radio communautaire Huronne

History
- First air date: September 1984

Technical information
- Class: LP
- ERP: 50 watts Horizontal polarization only
- HAAT: 25 meters (82 ft)

Links
- Website: laradiodewendake.com

CIHW-FM is a Canadian radio station, which broadcasts to the Wendat Nation. Broadcasting on 100.3 FM, CIHW is a community radio station operated by the Wendat Nation at Wendake, an enclave of First Nations land within Quebec City.

== History ==
On May 31, 1984, Comité de la Radio Communautaire Huronne - Wyandot Inc. received approval by the Canadian Radio-television and Telecommunications Commission (CRTC) to operate an FM radio station at Village-des-Hurons, Quebec. The station signed on the air in September 1984.

On April 15, 2016, the CRTC approved CIHW-FM's application to decrease the effective height of antenna above average terrain from 25 to 21.7 meters and relocate the transmitter. All other technical parameters would remain unchanged.

On January 17, 2018, Comité de la Radio communautaire Huronne-Wyandot inc. received CRTC approval to operate a Type B Native FM radio station in Wendake.

On April 24, 2019, CIHW-FM's license was licence was administratively renewed in 2019 and expired on August 31, 2022.

On June 20, 2024, Comité de la radio communautaire Huronne-Wyandot inc. received approval to operate at 100.3 MHz (channel 262A) at Wendake, Quebec with an average effective radiated power (ERP) of 239 watts (maximum ERP of 400 watts) and an effective height of the antenna above average terrain (EHAAT) of 18.9 metres.
