= WAPP-LP =

- Westhampton, New York; United States
- Frequency: 100.3 MHz

Programming
- Format: Christian radio

Ownership
- Owner: Aquila Broadcasting Corp.

Technical information
- Licensing authority: FCC
- Facility ID: 132494
- Class: L1
- ERP: 100 watts
- HAAT: 21.2 meters (70 ft)
- Transmitter coordinates: 40°48′53″N 72°38′44″W

Links
- Public license information: LMS

WAPP-LP (100.3 FM) was a low-power FM radio station licensed to Westhampton, New York.

== See also ==
- LifeTalk Radio — former network affiliation
