= KMOB-LP =

- Clearlake, California; United States
- Broadcast area: Clearlake-Ukiah
- Frequency: 100.3 MHz

Programming
- Format: Urban

Ownership
- Owner: Minds of Business Inc.

History
- First air date: 2004
- Last air date: 2021

Technical information
- Licensing authority: FCC
- Facility ID: 124107
- Class: L1
- ERP: 100 watts
- HAAT: −45.8 meters (−150 ft)
- Transmitter coordinates: 38°57′13″N 122°38′32″W

Links
- Public license information: LMS
- Website: kmob1003.com

KMOB-LP (100.3 FM) was a radio station broadcasting an urban music format. Licensed to Clearlake, California, United States, the station served the Clearlake-Ukiah area. The station was owned by Minds of Business Inc.

KMOB-LP's license was canceled in July 2026, as the station had not responded to an operational inquiry from the Federal Communications Commission (FCC) regarding its operations since November 26, 2021. The inquiry had been prompted by a complaint to the FCC that the station had not been on the air for over a decade, and that Minds of Business had been suspended by the California Franchise Tax Board since September 2, 2003. A Facebook page associated with KMOB-LP had not been updated since March 29, 2012; as of May 5, 2012, the station was still on the air, featuring an automated music playlist without station identifications or any other announcements.
