= WKGN =

Coordinates: 35°57′20″N 83°58′14″W

Knoxville, Tennessee; United States
- Frequency: 1340 kHz
- Branding: Fanrun Radio 105.7 - 1340

Programming
- Format: Sports
- Affiliations: Fox Sports Radio

Ownership
- Owner: Ryan Brown; (MH2 Media, LLC.)

History
- First air date: 1946

Technical information
- Licensing authority: FCC
- Facility ID: 68146
- Class: C
- Power: 1,000 watts
- Translator: 105.7 W289CU (Knoxville)

Links
- Public license information: Public file; LMS
- Webcast: Listen live
- Website: fanrunradio.com

WKGN is an AM radio station licensed to Knoxville, Tennessee. It was founded by Clarence Beaman, Jr. It first signed on the air September 28, 1947. After various format changes, including a Spanish format, WKGN became an all sports station. In September 2015 WKGN became affiliated with Fox Sports Radio and has both local and national sports talk shows.

WKGN has switched formats many times throughout its existence. Previous formats include, but are not limited to: Top 40 from the early 1960s thru 1976, album-oriented rock from 1976–1978, an all-disco format in 1978–1979, switching back to Top 40 in the summer of 1979, then adult contemporary in 1980, and a news-talk format from 1981 through 1985. In 1985, WKGN began programming an urban contemporary format, and in 1986, achieved the highest 12+ Arbitron ratings that the station had achieved since the early 1970s. In September 1987 the station briefly changed its call letters to WLIQ with an oldies format. In August 1988 the station became WKGN again and returned to the urban contemporary format in 1989.

Currently, WKGN hosts "Fan Run Radio" It consists of multiple on-air shows including Talk Sports, Under Review, The Drive, and Overtime.

TALK SPORTS-

Talk Sports is hosted by Jon Reed and the Station's Inaugural Employee of the Week Cody McClure. The producer's "P-team" consists of "Jumping" Jack Pianta, Miles Collins, and "Bad News" Bubba.
