= XEBG-AM =

Radio station in Tijuana, Baja California

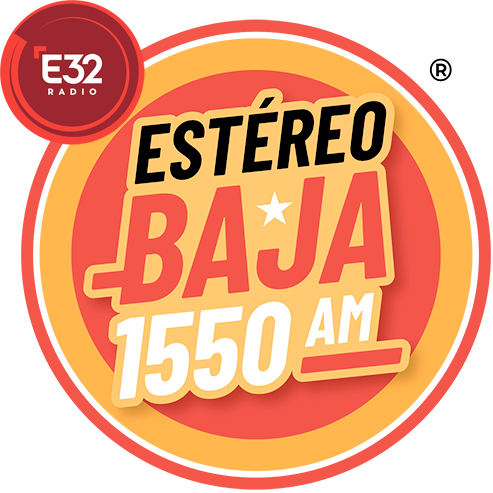
- Tijuana, Baja California; Mexico
- Broadcast area: San Diego–Tijuana
- Frequency: 1550 AM
- Branding: Estéreo Baja

Programming
- Format: English Classic

Ownership
- Owner: Grupo Cadena; (Mario Enrique Mayans Camacho)
- Operator: Esquina 32
- Sister stations: XESPN-AM, XHMORE-FM

History
- First air date: 1936
- Former frequencies: 820 AM

Technical information
- Licensing authority: CRT
- Class: C
- Power: 1,000 watts

Links
- Website: estereobaja.mx

XEBG-AM (1550 AM) is a radio station in Tijuana, Baja California, Mexico, airing a Spanish and English pop and rock music format. It is known as Estéreo Baja and operated by Esquina 32.

== History ==
Logo as Cadena 1550

XEBG received its first concession in October 1936. It was owned by Ángel B. Fernández and operated from facilities in the Baron Long house in Tijuana on 820 kHz, with 1,000 watts. Baron Long was the founder of the Agua Caliente resort, and some sources note that XEBG operated from the resort on 750 kHz, likely prior to its 1936 concession. XEBG moved to 1550 within several years of signing on and changed hands several times in its first 20 years of operation: Roberto Salazar bought it in 1946 and Octavio B. Lelevier in 1949. In 1956, Octavio's widow, Nelly Murillo Vda. de Lelevier, was granted a 30-year renewal for the concession.

In 1959, XEBG was bought by Mario Marcos Mayans, the founder of Cadena Baja California. Mario Enrique Mayans Concha became the concessionaire in 1977 after Marcos Mayans's death.

On May 22, 2022, Grupo Cadena ceased broadcast operations on its terrestrial stations, and moved the station's Spanish-language talk radio format (which was branded as "Cadena 1550") to online only. Esquina 32 acquired the group in early 2023 and formally launched its programming on the station on May 1, 2023.
