= XHITZ-FM =

Contemporary hit radio station in Tijuana

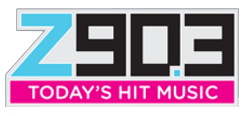
- Tijuana, Baja California; Mexico
- Broadcast area: San Diego–Tijuana
- Frequency: 90.3 MHz
- Branding: "Z90.3" or simply "Z90"

Programming
- Language: English
- Format: Contemporary hit radio
- Affiliations: Compass Media Networks; Premiere Networks

Ownership
- Owner: Comunicación XERSA, S.A. de C.V.
- Operator: Local Media San Diego LLC
- Sister stations: XETRA-FM, XHRM-FM

History
- First air date: September 1970
- Former call signs: XHIS-FM (1970–1983)
- Call sign meaning: Sounds like "hits"

Technical information
- Licensing authority: CRT
- Class: C
- ERP: 100,000 watts
- HAAT: 180.75 meters (593.0 ft)

Links
- Webcast: Listen Live
- Website: Z90.com

XHITZ-FM (90.3 FM "Z90.3") is an English-language Top 40 (CHR) radio station. It is licensed to Tijuana, Mexico, and broadcasts to the San Diego-Tijuana radio market. The station is owned by Comunicación XERSA, S.A. de C.V., a Mexican company. An American company, Local Media San Diego, holds 49% of the concession. LMSD pays a fee to use the frequency and programs the station. The studios, in the Sorrento Valley neighborhood of San Diego, are home to two other Mexican FM stations broadcasting in English, classic alternative-formatted XETRA-FM and rhythmic AC-formatted XHRM-FM.

XHITZ-FM has an effective radiated power (ERP) of 100,000 watts. The transmitter and tower are on Mount San Antonio in Tijuana. Z90.3 must abide by all Mexican broadcast regulations, including mandatory public service announcements, most of which are translated into English by Local Media San Diego, political coverage and the compulsory airings of La Hora Nacional ("The National Hour") on Sunday nights, and the Mexican National Anthem at midnight and 6:00 a.m. daily.

XHITZ carries the Top 40/CHR version of "Sunday Night Slow Jams", which begins at 8 p.m. It is one of two San Diego/Tijuana affiliates for the program, the other being sister station XHRM-FM, which carries the "Throwback" version.

== History ==
=== XHIS-FM ===
In September 1970, the station signed on the air as XHIS-FM. It began broadcasting more than three years before receiving its concession in November 1973. It was owned by Víctor Díaz, the founder of Califórmula Broadcasting, which would come to own and operate numerous stations in the San Diego-Tijuana radio market.

XHIS-FM signed on with a brokered radio format from the United States. Time Sales, Inc., owned by radio automation pioneer Paul Schafer, presented an automated progressive rock format known as "HIS Radio". Time Sales added a second Mexican station when 100.1 XHERS-FM (now 104.5 XHLTN-FM), a soft rock station known as "HERS Radio", signed on in December. A third station, XHQS-FM 95.7 "OURS", was also planned. Aside from the music, HIS Radio featured parodies of commercials and a satirical radio novel, the O.B. Ranger. The operation was run by Larry Shushan, a former owner of KPRI FM radio and one of the builders of KAAR, San Diego's first UHF television station.

XHIS and XHERS broadcast from a new facility in Tijuana with custom-built 100,000–watt transmitters, throwing maximum power at San Diego. These were the first border blasters on FM. Programming originated from Time Sales's studios and sales offices at the Royal Inn at the Wharf and was transported by cassette to the transmitter, as the Brinkley Act prevented a live hookup from being used. Within six months, Time Sales had two of the top three stations in San Diego.

=== FCC investigation ===
By 1973, however, the tides had turned for Time Sales. San Diego broadcasters complained of disloyal competition across the border that didn't have to play by the Federal Communications Commission's rules for U.S. radio stations. No news or public affairs were required for these Mexican stations. Owners of U.S.-based stations decried the promotion of XHIS and XHERS as "San Diego stations" not using the X in their call signs. The FCC opened an investigation into Time Sales, Schafer and Shushan, resulting in mounting legal fees. Ultimately, Time Sales folded, and Díaz began operating the station under the brand "Estéreo 90, La Buena Onda". By 1975, XHIS was broadcasting soul music and R&B. Ironically, it was more popular with teens and women than with men.

A 1981 row between Califórmula and politically motivated broadcast workers temporarily forced Díaz out of the broadcasting business. In April, a report had aired on one of the Califórmula stations criticizing Baja California Governor Roberto de la Madrid. Just two weeks after returning to an R&B format, in September, workers affiliated to the Union of Radio and Television Industry Workers (STIRT) went on strike, and the only way to resolve the strike was to sell XHIS and XHERS to Francisco Aguirre, founder of Mexico City broadcaster Grupo Radio Centro. The Tijuana acquisition marked GRC's first ever expansion outside the capital city.

=== XHITZ-FM ===
Two years later, Díaz bought back the cluster of XHIS and XHERS, instituting new call signs and formats on both. That year, XHIS became XHITZ-FM and changed to an album-oriented rock format under contract to San Diego Radio Company. However, in 1984, the station stumbled in an ownership dispute. A bitter battle between San Diego Radio Company and Califórmula led to the abrupt end of the album rock format as the latter took control of the station. Díaz cited continued low ratings, but the straw that broke the camel's back was a humorous news report read on the station that stated a German anthropologist had discovered a tribe of "mole people" living in the sewers of Mexico City. When the report was read in late June, it caught the attention of Mexican authorities, who were outraged over the secondhand account they had heard, which implied that Mexicans were so poor they lived in sewers.

In 1986, Díaz sold the American marketing rights for XHITZ again, this time to Broadcasting, Marketing and Management, Ltd. BMM ceased operation of the station on June 30, 1988 as it assigned the rights to another company, Consolidated Radio Sales, which was also bankrupt. The result was that Díaz and the head of Consolidated Radio Sales, Jack McCoy, clashed. In mid-July, McCoy fired all the employees in the U.S. and had all the locks changed, with several employees instead showing up to work in Tijuana. Later that day, however, a bankruptcy judge ruled that Díaz owned the U.S. operation of the stations.

In 1989, XHITZ flipped from adult contemporary to a rock-oriented hits format known as "Pirate Radio," based on the success of KQLZ in Los Angeles. But that rock hits format lasted only a year.

=== Rhythmic Contemporary ===
On April 5, 1990, XHITZ switched to a Dance-leaning Top 40 format, under Program Director Rick Thomas. "Z90" competed against Q106, which was the powerhouse Top 40 station in the market. With Z90's debut, however, it took only a few books for XHITZ to beat Q106. And thanks to its success, it also forced the market's only Urban Contemporary outlet, future sister station XHRM-FM, out of that format by 1993. As Z90 remained on top, Q106 shifted towards a more Mainstream Top 40 format. It wasn't until September 1996 that XHITZ had another direct competitor, 93.3 KHTS, which had a Dance lean, much like XHITZ. Even though XHITZ served as the official call letters, it was marketed unofficially as "XHTZ" due to the fact that most TV and radio call signs carry four letters.

By August 1998, XHITZ moved away from its Dance approach to begin focusing more on Hip-Hop/R&B. The station also rebranded as "Jammin' Z90" before reverting to "Z90.3". In 2002, Califórmula was winding down most of its operations as Díaz retired and then died. The U.S. operating rights were sold to Clear Channel Communications (forerunner of today's iHeartMedia) and the concession was transferred to a new Mexican concern, Comunicación XERSA. XHITZ remained a hip-hop leader until 2004, when XHMORE-FM flipped to a hip hop-leaning Rhythmic Top 40. These two stations competed for listeners until late 2009, when XHMORE changed formats. Shortly after this, XHITZ shifted back to its more dance-leaning direction. Despite being the market's only Rhythmic Top 40, XHITZ continued to share much of the same music as KHTS-FM and KEGY, all of which were rhythmic-leaning Top 40/CHRs. On April 2, 2012, XHITZ rebranded from "Z90.3" to "Jammin' Z90."

In mid-2014, XHITZ rebranded back to "Z90." Today, the station airs a mainstream Top 40/CHR format, resulting in both Nielsen BDS and Mediabase moving XHITZ from the Rhythmic to Mainstream reporting panels in February 2015.

=== Clear Channel and Finest City ===
Clear Channel controlled XHITZ and two other radio stations licensed to Mexico but programmed in English and aimed at the San Diego market, as well as owning five FM stations in San Diego as well. A 2003 Federal Communications Commission ruling forced Clear Channel to divest the operating rights to its Mexican stations in order to remain under FCC ownership caps.

On July 25, 2005, Clear Channel transferred the programming and local marketing arrangements of XHITZ, along with XETRA-FM and XHRM-FM, to Finest City Broadcasting. Finest City was a new company under the direction of former Clear Channel/San Diego VP/Market Manager Mike Glickenhaus. Finest City took over operations on December 1, 2005.

=== Local Media San Diego ===
In 2009, these programming and marketing rights were sold to Broadcast Corporation of the Americas after Finest City defaulted on assets that resulted in its bankruptcy. In 2010, BCA spun off XHITZ, XETRA and XHRM to Local Media San Diego after a change in management.

On October 6, 2015, Midwest Television, the owner of KFMB-TV channel 8, KFMB 760 AM and KFMB-FM 100.7, announced that it had entered into a joint operating agreement with Local Media San Diego LLC. They formed an entity known as "SDLocal" to manage its cluster of radio stations. The intent of this agreement was to "[preserve the] local ownership and operation of San Diego's top-rated radio stations". The agreement ended at the end of 2016.

Local Media San Diego eventually acquired KFMB and KFMB-FM outright from Tegna, Inc. on March 17, 2020. KFMB 760 AM was divested to iHeartMedia. Tegna had purchased Midwest Television's stations in 2018. Local Media San Diego held onto KFMB-FM, which switched its call letters to KFBG; LMSD would later sell KFBG to Lotus Communications in 2025.
