= XHMORE-FM =

Radio station in Tijuana, Baja California, Mexico

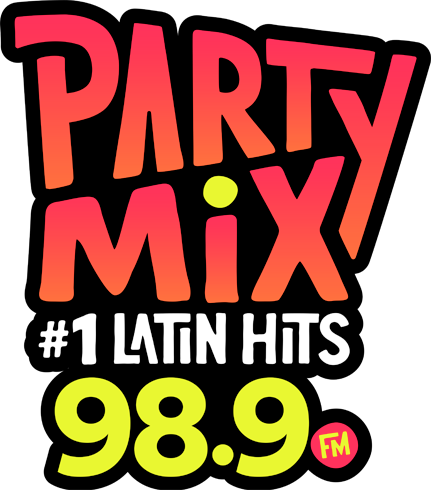
- Tijuana, Baja California; Mexico
- Broadcast area: San Diego–Tijuana
- Frequency: 98.9 FM
- Branding: Party Mix 98.9

Programming
- Language: Spanish
- Format: Regional Mexican, Latin Music

Ownership
- Owner: Grupo Cadena; (Mario Enrique Mayans Camacho)
- Operator: Esquina 32
- Sister stations: XEBG-AM, XESPN-AM

History
- First air date: September 8, 1977 (concession)
- Former call signs: XHQF-FM
- Call sign meaning: Station was known as "More FM" twice in its history (1994–2004, 2010–2022)

Technical information
- Licensing authority: CRT
- Class: B
- ERP: 50,000 watts
- HAAT: 126.4 meters (415 ft)

Links
- Webcast: Listen live
- Website: partymixfm.com

XHMORE-FM (98.9 FM) is a radio station in Tijuana, Baja California Mexico. It is operated by Esquina 32 and broadcasts a Regional Mexican and Latin music format known as "Party Mix" to the San Diego–Tijuana region.

== History ==
XHMORE started as XHQF-FM received its concession on September 8, 1977. It was owned by Jorge Méndez Alemán, who had sought a station since the late 1960s and was initially awarded 97.7 MHz. In March 1986, control passed to its current concessionaire. The station was originally known as "Stereo Cú-Cú".

For a number of years prior to 1993, XHQF had programmed a Top 40/CHR format under the name "Radio Sensación" with most of the music being in English and the presentation in Spanish. By 1994, it evolved into a Rock en Español format as "More FM," with the XHMORE-FM call sign. This first incarnation as a rock station lasted until 2004, when it flipped to an English-language rhythmic contemporary format as "Blazin' 98.9", operated by US-based MEC Communications. Market competitors included XHITZ-FM 90.3 and KHTS-FM 93.3. On November 2, 2009, the music stopped, and the station adopted a sports radio format as the local ESPN Radio affiliate, which had previously broadcast on XESPN-AM 800. On September 1, 2010, ESPN Radio was replaced by the return of the More FM format, in its second incarnation; ESPN Radio migrated to XEPE-AM 1700.

=== TJ/SD ===
Effective March 31, 2018, Grupo Cadena signed a sales and marketing agreement with Flip Media, owned by Randal Phillips, to relaunch the station as well as sister XEWV-FM in Mexicali as "TJ SD," with San Diego rock radio veteran Michael Halloran heading the programming department. One advantage of the operating arrangement with Flip, according to Phillips, was that the rental expenses for XHMORE would be lower than those of comparable Mexican stations operated from the United States. However, the flip to "TJ SD" never occurred.

Logo before moving online

On May 22, 2022, Grupo Cadena ceased broadcast operations on its terrestrial stations, moving XHMORE's "Rock en Español" format to internet only. It did not begin coming back on the air until April 2023, after the Cadena stations were sold to a consortium related to Tijuana news website Esquina 32. Esquina 32 formally launched the station on May 1, 2023, originally planning to air a pop format known as Zoom FM before switching to Regional Mexican and later branding it as Adictiva Radio.

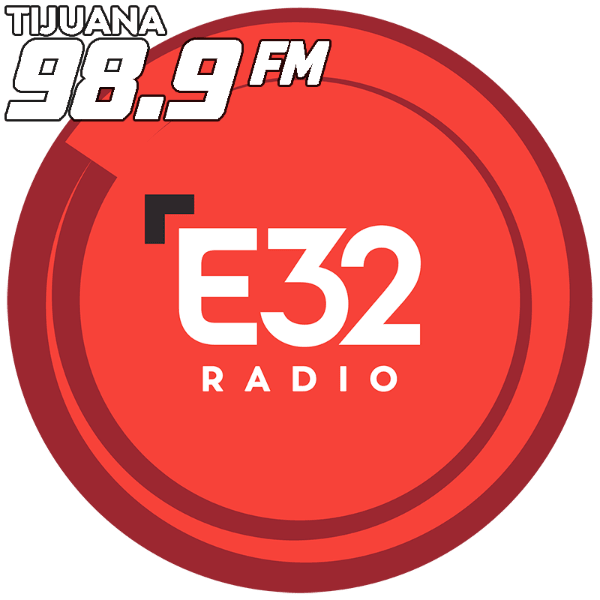
Former logo
