= KCUG-LP =

Omaha, Nebraska; United States
- Frequency: 100.3 MHz
- Branding: Gospel Music Omaha

Programming
- Format: Urban Gospel

Ownership
- Owner: Gospel Music Omaha

History
- First air date: August 1, 2017

Technical information
- Licensing authority: FCC
- Facility ID: 193882
- Class: L1
- ERP: 20 watts
- HAAT: 65.85 metres (216 ft)
- Transmitter coordinates: 41°18′43″N 96°00′14″W

Links
- Public license information: LMS
- Webcast: Listen live
- Website: Official website

KCUG-LP (100.3 FM) is a low power radio station broadcasting an urban gospel format. The station is operated by Gospel Music Omaha. The station serves northern Omaha.
