= XHRM-FM =

Radio station in Tijuana, Baja California

- Tijuana, Baja California; Mexico
- Broadcast area: San Diego–Tijuana
- Frequency: 92.5 MHz
- Branding: "Magic 92.5"

Programming
- Language: English
- Format: Rhythmic adult contemporary
- Affiliations: Compass Media Networks

Ownership
- Owner: Comunicación XERSA, S.A. de C.V.
- Operator: Local Media San Diego LLC
- Sister stations: XETRA-FM, XHITZ-FM

History
- First air date: February 1979
- Call sign meaning: Last initials of José Luis Rivas Marentes, founding owner

Technical information
- Licensing authority: CRT
- Class: C1
- ERP: 100,000 watts
- HAAT: 191.9 m (630 ft)

Links
- Webcast: Listen Live
- Website: magic925.com

XHRM-FM (92.5 FM "Magic 92.5") is an English-language rhythmic adult contemporary radio station serving the areas of Tijuana, Baja California, Mexico, and San Diego, California, United States. XHRM's concession is held by the Mexican company Comunicación XERSA, S.A. de C.V., and XHRM is one of three Tijuana/San Diego stations programmed by Local Media San Diego LLC. The station's studios are in San Diego's Sorrento Valley district, with transmitting facilities located atop Mount San Antonio in Tijuana.

== History ==
XHRM was tentatively assigned in 1967 to José Luis Rivas Marentes, with the proposed frequency of 99.3 MHz. Rivas Marentes, doing business as Radio Moderna Mexicana, S.A., obtained the concession—now for 92.5 FM—on January 19, 1972; while other concessions had been issued earlier, XHRM is recognized as Baja California's first FM station. 92.5 FM debuted in February 1979 as San Diego's first urban contemporary FM station, featuring soul, rap, and gospel music. Although owned by a Mexican company (as required by Mexican law), it was programmed by a U.S. company. At the time, it was the only San Diego station managed by blacks and programmed specifically for the black community.

XHRM became one of the first stations in the U.S. to regularly play freestyle songs as a part of their playlist. The combination of Latin-based Freestyle songs along with the station's original mainstream R&B sound was a success and was the station's signature for the decade.

In 1988 and 1989, a dispute opened between the US programmers and the Mexican concession holders. In January 1988, the Tijuana transmitter was toppled in a storm; it took nine months to build a new permanent tower, during which time XHRM's power was drastically cut and the station lost its national advertising accounts. The station's studio equipment also began to fail, which exacerbated its problems. The programmers ceased to pay their monthly fees in a last-ditch effort to get Radio Moderna Mexicana to bail them out.

In November 1989, Radio Moderna Mexicana ordered the US programmers to cease operating the station for non-payment. The station, now operated directly by the concessionaire, then changed to "Power 92-5", playing soft rock and dance music (in essence, a Rhythmic Top 40) and whose flip predated another station that would later flip to the same format in April 1990, XHITZ, which would become XHRM's sister station more than a decade later.

By May 1990, XHRM returned to their Urban direction and rebilled itself as "Hot 92.5." By that point, however, XHITZ had already made inroads by luring listeners to their station. XHRM later suffered a tragic setback when Rivas Marentes, the founding owner, died in a plane crash near Hermosillo that September. On June 29, 1993, the format changed to modern rock as "92.5 The Flash". In January 1998, due to low ratings, the station shifted towards a AAA format, and rebranded as "Independent Radio 92/5ive", though this resulted in lower ratings. On September 7, 1998, at 7 p.m. (after XETRA-FM became its sister station), KMCG ("Magic 95-7") and its R&B format were moved to the 92.5 frequency. The format would soon evolve to rhythmic oldies under program director Rick Thomas. An on-air slogan, "San Diego's Old School", highlighted the oldies aspect of the programming. The transition to rhythmic oldies was successful, as XHRM was the top rated station in the San Diego market for a period; XHRM went to #1 again in 2007 and remained there for several years.

By late 2009, a San Diego company, Finest City Broadcasting, was the programming operator of not only XHRM, but also two other Mexican-licensed stations, XHITZ and XETRA-FM. In January 2010, Local Media of America acquired most of the assets of Finest City Broadcasting, including these programming rights. Local Media of America changed their name to Local Media San Diego LLC in February, 2011.

In September 2011, XHRM promoted one of its on-air personalities, Todd Himaka, to music director. In following months, the station began leaning towards Rhythmic AC. This followed Z90.3, Channel 933, and Q96 all tweaking their formats in the Contemporary hit music direction, away from Mainstream Top 40/Dance Top 40, mostly to compete with KEGY. In December 2012, XHRM picked up new competition in the form of KSSX, which happens to reside at the 95.7 frequency that was the previous home of XHRM's current format. After gaining little to no traction, despite frequent music and era tweaks, KSSX completely abandoned their "Old School" format, switching to a current, Rhythmic format in May 2016.

On October 6, 2015, Midwest Television (owners of KFMB and KFMB-FM) announced that it had entered into a joint operating agreement with Local Media San Diego LLC, forming an entity known as SDLocal to manage their collective cluster of stations. The intent of this agreement is to "[preserve the] local ownership and operation of San Diego's top-rated radio stations". The agreement ended at the end of 2016. Local Media San Diego eventually acquired KFMB and KFMB-FM outright from Tegna, Inc. on March 17, 2020, with KFMB (AM) being concurrently divested to iHeartMedia while the FM station was renamed KFBG and was later sold to Lotus Communications in 2025; Tegna had purchased Midwest Television's stations in 2018.

== Current ==
On January 10, 2013, the station changed its slogan to "The Beat of San Diego." On the same date, the station introduced a new logo. Currently, the station's playlist consists of classic soul and R&B from the late 1960s to the 1990s (with occasional tracks from the 2000s), disco and classic dance tracks from the late 1960s to the early 1990s, some old school hip-hop and new wave tracks, and no current songs, though the station has added many recent songs from artists such as Bruno Mars and Pharrell Williams.

In a nod to their previous rhythmic oldies format and "San Diego's Old School" slogan, XHRM carries an "Old School Block Party" program on Saturday nights.
