= DTV Border Fix Act =

The DTV Border Fix Act (S. 2507) was a bill introduced to the U.S. Congress in 2007. It would have allowed all television stations within 80 kilometers (50 miles) of the Mexican border, in areas such as San Diego and the Rio Grande Valley, to keep their analog signals active for another five years. The bill passed the Senate but did not pass the House.

== See also ==
- Digital television transition in the United States
